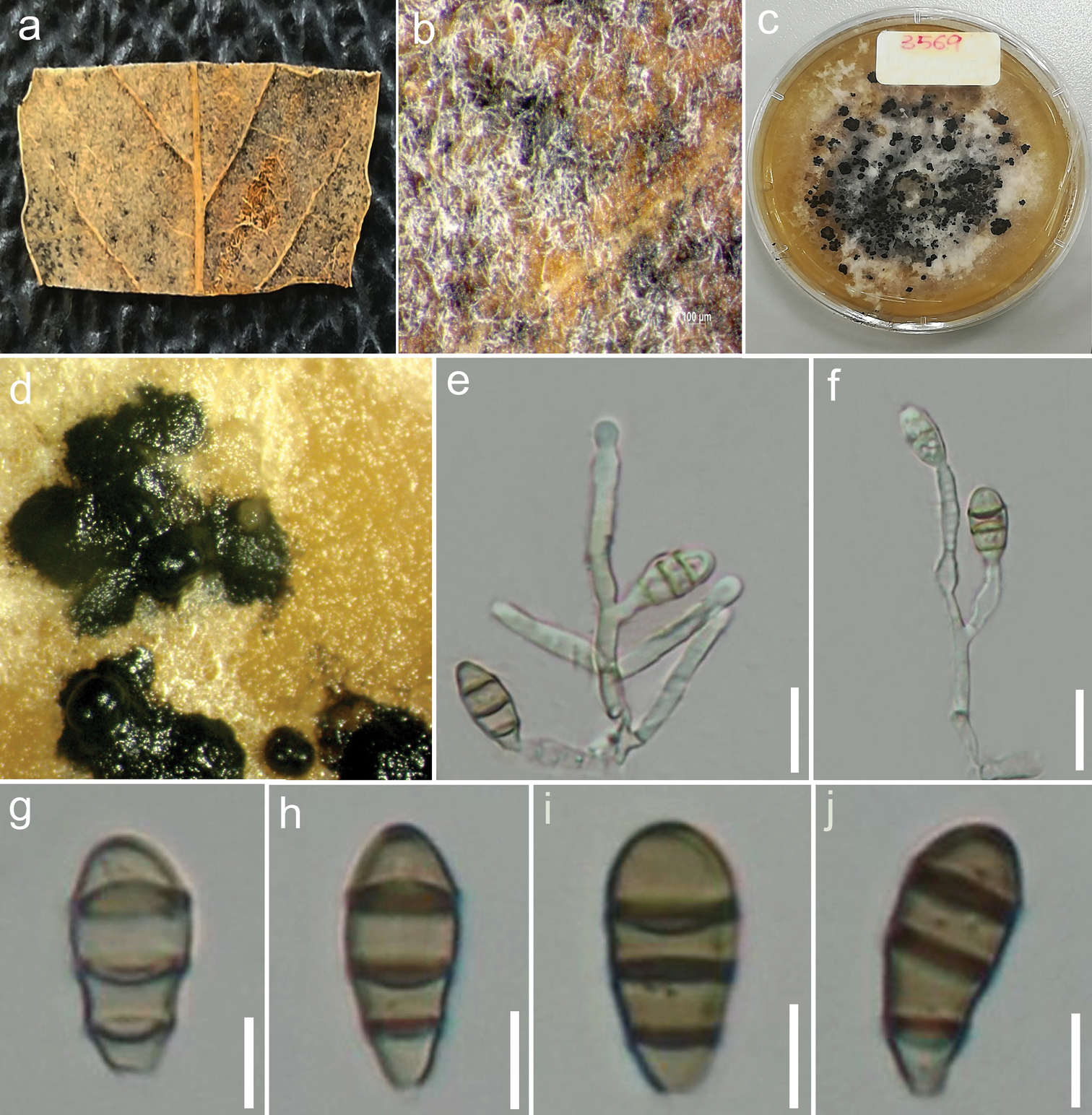
- Sporocadus rosigena on a leaf of Quercus ilex

Scientific classification
- Kingdom: Fungi
- Division: Ascomycota
- Class: Sordariomycetes
- Order: Amphisphaeriales
- Family: Sporocadaceae
- Genus: Sporocadus; Corda (1839)

= Sporocadus =

Genus of fungi

Sporocadus is a genus of plant pathogens in the family Sporocadaceae.

Species of the family Sporocadaceae are endophytic, plant pathogenic or saprobic, and associated with a wide range of host plants.

Sporocadus was established by Corda (in 1839) to include four species, but with no mention of the type. Hughes (in 1958) tried to lectotypify Sporocadus based on Sporocadus lichenicola. The genus was once synonymised under Seimatosporium by Sutton (in 1975), but was later classified as a distinct genus by Brockman (in 1976) and Nag Raj (in 1993). Liu et al. (2019a) showed that both Sporocadus and Seimatosporium are phylogenetically distinct and species in Sporocadus lack appendages.

It is one of the fungal species associated with grapevine trunk diseases in Washington wine grapes and California table grapes in North America, especially Sporocadus incarnatus. Grapevine trunk diseases (GTDs), caused by a complex of fungi (including Inonotus, Diatrype, Sporocadus and Phaeoacremonium species), are a global threat to vineyard longevity.

Collections of fungal samples from two dead leaf specimens from Italy found that Discosia ravennicasp and Sporocadus rosigena, two different genera in Xylariomycetidae subclass and Sordariomycetes class had been reported as being new hosts on Quercus ilex in 2021.

== Distribution ==
It has a wide distribution, found in North America, Europe (including Italy,) and New Zealand.

== Species ==
As accepted by Species Fungorum;

- Sporocadus acerinus (Bäumler) M. Morelet (1985)
- Sporocadus biseptatus F. Liu, L. Cai & Crous (2018)
- Sporocadus cornicola (Wijayaw. & Camporesi) F. Liu, L. Cai & Crous (2018)
- Sporocadus cotini F. Liu, L. Cai & Crous (2018)
- Sporocadus dacicus (Săvul. & Hulea) M. Morelet (1985)
- Sporocadus incanus F. Liu, L. Cai & Crous (2018)
- Sporocadus mali F. Liu, L. Cai & Crous (2018)
- Sporocadus microcyclus F. Liu, L. Cai & Crous (2018)
- Sporocadus multiseptatus F. Liu, L. Cai & Crous (2018)
- Sporocadus populinus (Bres.) Orsenigo, Rodondi & B. Sutton (1998)
- Sporocadus rosarum (Henn.) F. Liu, L. Cai & Crous (2018)
- Sporocadus rosigena F. Liu, L. Cai & Crous (2018)
- Sporocadus rotundatus F. Liu, L. Cai & Crous (2018)
- Sporocadus sorbi (Wijayaw., Camporesi & K.D. Hyde) F. Liu, L. Cai & Crous (2018)
- Sporocadus trimerus (Sacc.) Arx (1981)
- Sporocadus trimorphus F. Liu, L. Cai & Crous (2018)

Former species;

- S. banksiae (H.J. Swart & D.A. Griffiths) Arx (1981) = Cooksonomyces banksiae, Ascomycota
- S. berckmansii (Milbrath) M. Morelet (1985) = Seimatosporium berckmansii, Sporocadaceae
- S. caninus (Brunaud) Brockmann (1976) = Seimatosporium caninum, Sporocadaceae
- S. carpophilus (Lév.) Arx (1981) = Stigmina carpophila, Mycosphaerellaceae
- S. cassiopes (Rostr.) M. Morelet (1985) = Seimatosporium cassiopes, Sporocadaceae
- S. caudata Preuss (1851) = Seimatosporium caudatum, Sporocadaceae
- S. compactus (Sacc.) Arx (1981) = Thyrostroma compactum, Botryosphaeriaceae
- S. corni-albae (Roum.) Orsenigo, Rodondi & B. Sutton (1998) = Coryneopsis corni-albae, Sporocadaceae
- S. georginae Corda (1839) = Metadiplodia georginae, Ascomycota
- S. glandigenus (Bubák & Gonz. Frag.) M. Morelet (1985) = Seimatosporium glandigenum, Sporocadaceae
- S. herbarum Corda (1839) = Diplodia herbarum, Botryosphaeriaceae
- S. lichenicola Corda (1839) = Discostroma corticola, Sporocadaceae
- S. longestipitatus (Berl. & Bres.) Orsenigo, Rodondi & B. Sutton (1998) = Coryneum longistipitatum, Coryneaceae
- S. macrospermus (Berk. & Broome) M. Morelet (1985) = Seimatosporium macrospermum, Sporocadaceae
- S. maculans Corda (1839) = Pestalotiopsis maculans, Pestalotiopsidaceae
- S. missionus (Speg.) M. Morelet (1985) = Seimatosporium missionum, Sporocadaceae
- S. pestalozzioides (Sacc.) M. Morelet (1985) = Seimatosporium pestalozzioides, Sporocadaceae
- S. pezizoides (Ellis & Everh.) M. Morelet (1985) = Seimatosporium pezizoides, Sporocadaceae
- S. platani (Fuckel) Arx (1981) = Pseudocercospora platanigena, Mycosphaerellaceae
- S. pyriformis Preuss (1853) = Metadiplodia pyriformis, Ascomycota
- S. rhododendri (Schwein.) M. Morelet (1985) = Seimatosporium rhododendri, Sporocadaceae
- S. vaccinii (Fuckel) M. Morelet (1985) = Seimatosporium vaccinii, Sporocadaceae
