= Discosia artocreas =

Scientific classification
- Kingdom: Fungi
- Division: Ascomycota
- Class: Sordariomycetes
- Order: Amphisphaeriales
- Family: Sporocadaceae
- Genus: Discosia
- Species: D. artocreas

Binomial name
- Discosia artocreas (Tode) Fr., (1849)

Synonyms
- Sphaeria artocreas

Species of fungus

Discosia artocreas is an ascomycete fungus that is a plant pathogen.

In Iceland, it has been reported from the host species Alchemilla alpina, Betula pubescens, Geum rivale, Salix herbacea and Thalictrum alpinum.

In New Zealand, it has been reported as a host on Araucaria heterophylla (Salisb.) Franco and Podocarpus totara D.Don.
