= Flannel =

Soft woven fabric

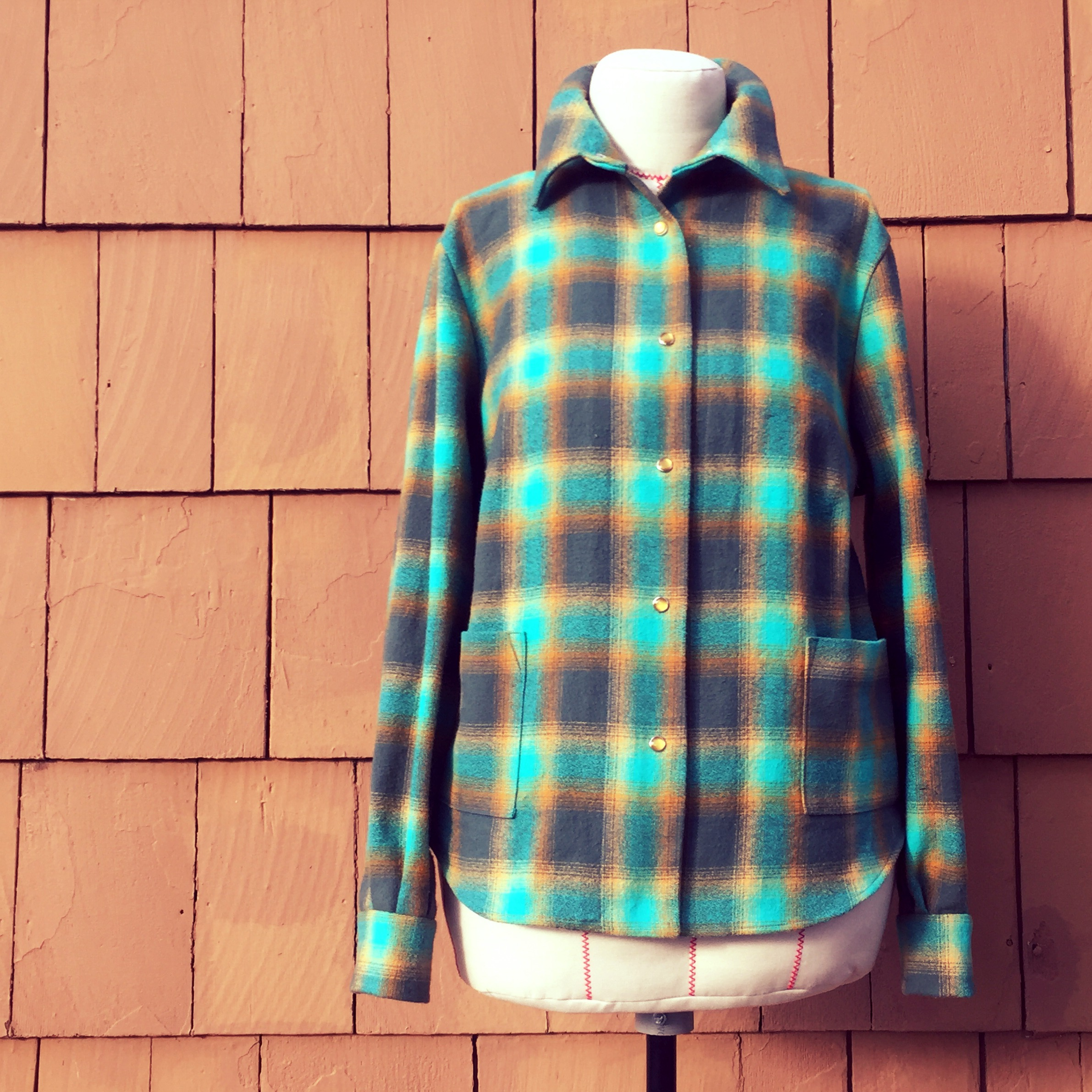
Flannel shirts are often plaid.

Flannel is a soft woven fabric of varying fineness. Flannel was originally made from carded wool or worsted yarn, but is now often made from either wool, cotton, or synthetic fiber. Flannel is commonly used to make tartan clothing, blankets, bed sheets, sleepwear, and several other uses.

Flannel may be brushed to create extra softness or remain unbrushed. Brushing is a mechanical process wherein a fine metal brush rubs the fabric to raise fine fibres from the loosely spun yarns to form a nap on one or both sides. If the flannel is not napped, it gains its softness through the loosely spun yarn in its woven form.

The term "flannel shirt" is often mistakenly used to refer to any shirt with a plaid or tartan pattern. However, 'flannel' refers simply to the fabric; not all flannel shirts are plaid and not all plaid shirts are flannel.

== Etymology ==
The word's origin is uncertain, but a Welsh origin has been suggested as fabric similar to flannel can be traced back to Wales, where it was well known as early as the 16th century. The fabric was called ''Welsh cotton'', and despite its name, it was a coarse woolen material with a fluffed surface similar to flannel.

The French term flanelle was used in the late 17th century, and the German Flanell was used in the early 18th century.

== History ==
Flannel has been made since the 17th century, gradually replacing the older Welsh plains, some of which were finished as "cottons" or friezes, coarse woolen cloth that was the local textile product. In the 19th century, flannel was made particularly in towns such as Newtown, Montgomeryshire, Hay on Wye, and Llanidloes. The expansion of its production is closely associated with the spread of carding mills, which prepared the wool for spinning, this being the first aspect of the production of woollen cloth to be mechanised (apart from fulling). The marketing of these Welsh woollen clothes was largely controlled by the Drapers Company of Shrewsbury.

Flannel became popular in the United States during the Civil War, when it was imported as an inexpensive, sturdy material for soldiers’ basic coats and undershirts. American entrepreneur Hamilton Carhartt is most credited with popularizing flannel garments in the USA. He opened a flannel-focused textile plant, the first of its kind, in Detroit in 1889. It was during the years following this introduction that the American middle class adopted the flannel shirt as a workwear staple.

At one time, Welsh, Yorkshire, Lancashire, and Irish flannels differed slightly in character due largely to the grade of raw wool used, some being softer and finer than others. Dyes determine the flannel's color; this was achieved by mixing white, blue, brown, and black wools in varying proportions. Lighter shades were achieved by bleaching with sulphur dioxide.

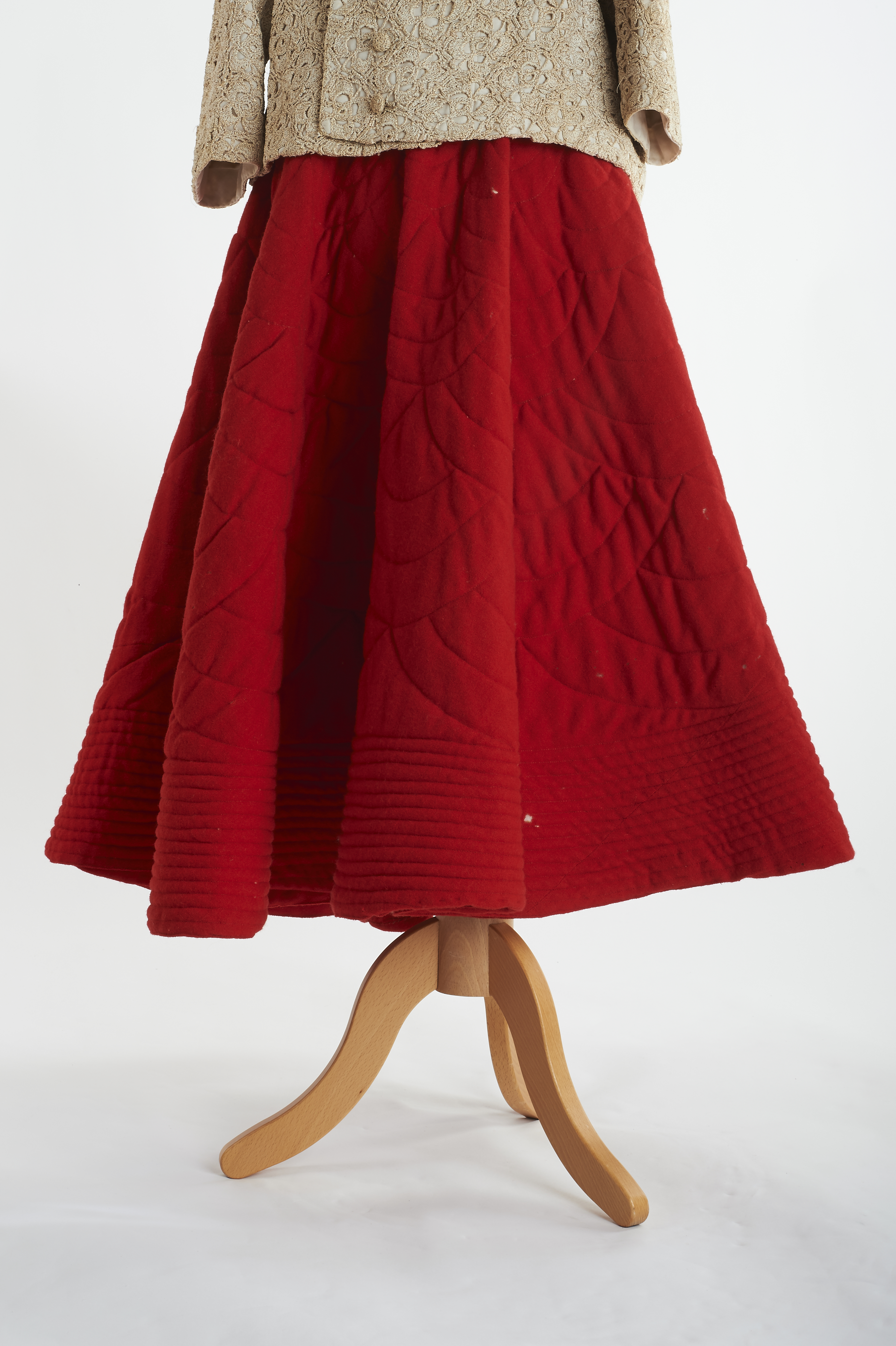
Red flannel skirt, designed by Sybil Connolly in 1957

During the 1950s, Irish designer Sybil Connolly, inspired by Aran Island and traditional Irish peasant kilts, designed a 'Red Flannel' skirt using red flannel wool.

Originally, flannel was made of fine, short staple wool, but by the 20th century, mixtures of silk and cotton had become common. At this time, flannel trousers became popular in sports, especially cricket, and it was used extensively until the late 1970s. Flannel plaid shirts became popular teen wear in the early 1990s, being part of the grunge style of bands like Nirvana and Pearl Jam.

== Types ==
Flannelette typically refers to a napped cotton fabric imitating the texture of flannel. The weft is generally coarser than the warp. The flannel-like appearance is created by creating a nap from the weft; scratching it and raising it up. Flannelette can either have long or short nap, and can be napped on one or two sides. It comes in many colours, both solid and patterned.

Baby flannel is a lightweight fabric used for childrenswear.

Cotton flannel or Canton flannel is a cotton fabric napped on one or two sides.

Ceylon's flannel was a name for a wool and cotton mixture.

Diaper flannel is a stout cotton fabric napped on both sides, and used for making cloth diapers.

Vegetable flannel, invented by Léopold Lairitz in Germany in the 1800s, uses fibres from the Scots pine rather than wool.

== Weave ==
Flannel, flannelette, and cotton flannel can be woven in either a twill weave or plain weave. The weave is often hidden by napping on one or both sides. After weaving, it is napped once, then bleached, dyed, or otherwise treated, and then napped a second time.

== See also ==
- Argyle (pattern)
- Check (pattern)
- Coldharbour Mill – worsted flannel museum
- Madras (cloth)
- Sherpa fabric
- Tartan
