= Seimatosporium cornicola =

Scientific classification
- Kingdom: Fungi
- Division: Ascomycota
- Class: Sordariomycetes
- Order: Amphisphaeriales
- Family: Sporocadaceae
- Genus: Seimatosporium
- Species: S. cornicola

Binomial name
- Seimatosporium cornicola (NN. Wijayawardene & E. Camporesi) (2016)

Species of fungus

Seimatosporium cornicola is an ascomycete fungus belonging to the family Amphisphaeriaceae. It is confirmed to be saprobic onto bloody dogwood, a European species. Growth attempts showed it had a slow cycle, taking a week to grow to a diameter of 2.5 cm at 18 °C. Its color and other properties are reportedly: "white to pale brown from above, greyish white from below, with sparse mycelium, flat, margin uneven". It was discovered in Italy in the year 2016 by a group of Chinese researchers.
