= Strickeria =

Scientific classification
- Kingdom: Fungi
- Division: Ascomycota
- Class: Sordariomycetes
- Order: Amphisphaeriales
- Family: Sporocadaceae
- Genus: Strickeria; Körb.

Genus of fungi

Strickeria is a genus of fungi within the class Sordariomycetes.

The genus was circumscribed by Gustav Wilhelm Körber in Parerga Lichenol. on page 400 in 1865.

The genus name of Strickeria is in honour of Otto Julius Felix Stricker (1818–1881?), who was a German doctor and botanist (Lichenology) and also was an Entomologist. He worked as a district physician in Stettin and Breslau.

== Species ==
As accepted by Species Fungorum;

- Strickeria atraphaxis Kravtzev (1961)
- Strickeria biceps Kravtzev (1955)
- Strickeria calligoni Kravtzev (1961)
- Strickeria convolvuli Koshk. (1970)
- Strickeria dendrostellerae Kravtzev (1961)
- Strickeria desertorum Kravtzev (1961)
- Strickeria dmitrieviana Kravtzev (1961)
- Strickeria elbursensis (Petr.) Koshk. (1973)
- Strickeria ephedrae Golovin (1950)
- Strickeria eurotiae Kravtzev (1961)
- Strickeria everkenii Körb. (1873)
- Strickeria halimodendri Gucevič (1960)
- Strickeria haloxyli Kravtzev (1955)
- Strickeria iliensis Kravtzev (1955)
- Strickeria kazachstanica Kravtzev (1955)
- Strickeria kochii Körb. (1865)
- Strickeria negundinis (Ellis & Everh.) Byzova (1987)
- Strickeria oxystoma (Sacc. & Speg.) Cooke (1887)
- Strickeria oxystomoides (Sacc.) Kuntze (1898)
- Strickeria patellaris (P. Karst.) Kuntze (1898)
- Strickeria pistaciae Bondartseva (1960)
- Strickeria populina (Ellis & Everh.) Frolov (1987)
- Strickeria pseudostromatica (Rehm) Koshk. (1973)
- Strickeria rhois T.M. Achundov (1971)
- Strickeria sarhaddensis (Petr.) Koshk. (1970)
- Strickeria schwarzmanniana Kravtzev (1955)
- Strickeria scutellata Kravtzev (1955)
- Strickeria silenes T.M. Achundov (1971)
- Strickeria spiraeae Domashova (1960)
- Strickeria spiraeanthi Byzova (1968)
- Strickeria trichanthemidis Byzova (1964)
- Strickeria turkestanica Kravtzev (1955)
- Strickeria uspallatensis (Speg.) Byzova (1987)

Former species;

- S. ampullacea (Rehm) G. Winter (1885) = Teichospora ampullacea, Teichosporaceae
- S. amygdaloides (Ellis & Everh.) Lindau (1897) = Chaetoplea amygdaloides, Phaeosphaeriaceae
- S. aspera (Ellis & Everh.) Kuntze (1898) = Chaetoplea aspera, Phaeosphaeriaceae
- S. brevirostris (Fr.) G. Winter (1885) = Teichospora brevirostris, Teichosporaceae
- S. buxi (Fabre) Kuntze (1898) = Hypoxylon buxi, Hypoxylaceae
- S. cephalandrae (E. Müll. & S. Ahmad) S. Ahmad (1979) = Pleospora cephalandrae, Pleosporaceae
- S. commutata (Sacc.) Kuntze (1898) = Teichospora commutata, Teichosporaceae
- S. coronata (Niessl) Arx & E. Müll. (1975) = Cilioplea coronata, Lophiostomataceae
- S. crossota (Ellis & Everh.) Kuntze (1898) = Chaetoplea crossota, Phaeosphaeriaceae
- S. deflectens (P. Karst.) Cooke (1887) = Teichospora deflectens, Teichosporaceae
- S. denudata Feltgen (1901) = Teichosporella denudata, Dothideomycetes
- S. dura (Fuckel) G. Winter (1885) = Teichosporella dura, Dothideomycetes
- S. fulgurata (Ellis & Everh.) Kuntze (1898) = Cilioplea fulgurata, Lophiostomataceae
- S. helenae (Ellis & Everh.) Kuntze (1898) = Chaetoplea helenae, Phaeosphaeriaceae
- S. hispida (Fuckel) G. Winter (1885) = Pleosphaeria hispida, Sordariomycetes
- S. ignavis (De Not.) G. Winter (1880) = Teichospora ignavis, Teichosporaceae
- S. incisa (Ellis & Everh.) M.E. Barr (1990) = Platystomum incisum, Lophiostomataceae
- S. interstitialis (Cooke & Peck) Kuntze (1898) = Cucurbitaria interstitialis, Cucurbitariaceae
- S. inverecunda (De Not.) Kuntze (1898) = Chaetoplea inverecunda, Phaeosphaeriaceae
- S. jungermannicola C. Massal. (1895) = Pleostigma jungermannicola, Dothideomycetes
- S. kelseyi (Ellis & Everh.) M.E. Barr (1987) = Phragmodothella kelseyi, Sporocadaceae
- S. kravtzevii Schwarzman (1961) = Pleospora kravtzevii, Pleosporaceae
- S. longispora H. Wegelin (1894) = Chaetoplea longispora, Phaeosphaeriaceae
- S. mammoides (Ellis & Everh.) Kuntze (1898) = Decaisnella mammoides, Massariaceae
- S. mesascium (De Not.) Cooke (1887) = Decaisnella mesascium, Massariaceae
- S. minima (Ellis & Everh.) Kuntze (1898) = Capronia minima, Herpotrichiellaceae
- S. muricata (Ellis & Everh.) Kuntze (1898) = Discostroma muricatum, Sporocadaceae
- S. mutabilis (Pers.) G. Winter (1885) = Pseudotrichia mutabilis, Melanommataceae
- S. nitida (Ellis & Everh.) Kuntze (1898) = Pleospora nitida, Pleosporaceae
- S. nubilosa (Ellis & Everh.) Kuntze (1898) = Chaetoplea nubilosa, Phaeosphaeriaceae
- S. obducens (Schumach.) G. Winter (1885) = Praetumpfia obducens, Melanommataceae
- S. obtusa (Fuckel) G. Winter (1885) = Montagnula obtusa, Didymosphaeriaceae
- S. ohiensis (Ellis & Everh.) Kuntze (1898) = Thyridium ohiense, Thyridiaceae
- S. pilosella (Sacc. & Roum.) G. Winter (1885) = Pleosphaeria pilosella, Sordariomycetes
- S. pinea (Sacc.) M.E. Barr (1990) = Praetumpfia obducens, Melanommataceae
- S. princeps (Fabre) Kuntze (1898) = Decaisnella princeps, Massariaceae
- S. propendula (P. Karst.) Cooke (1887) = Discostroma propendulum, Sporocadaceae
- S. pygmaea (Ellis & Everh.) Kuntze (1898) = Pleospora pygmaea, Pleosporaceae
- S. rabenhorstii (Auersw.) Cooke (1887) = Cucurbitaria rabenhorstii, Cucurbitariaceae
- S. seminuda (Pers.) G. Winter (1885) = Requienella seminuda, Requienellaceae
- S. solitaria (Ellis) Kuntze (1898) = Cucurbitaria solitaria, Cucurbitariaceae
- S. spectabilis (Fabre) Lindau (1897) = Decaisnella spectabilis, Massariaceae
- S. taphrina (Fr.) G. Winter (1885) = Massarina taphrina, Massarinaceae
- S. tenacella (Fr.) Kuntze (1898) = Cucurbitaria tenacella, Cucurbitariaceae
- S. trabicola (Fuckel) G. Winter (1885) = Teichospora trabicola, Teichosporaceae
- S. umbonata (Ellis & Everh.) Kuntze (1898) = Karstenula umbonata, Didymosphaeriaceae
- S. vaga (Rehm) G. Winter (1885) = Capronia vaga, Herpotrichiellaceae
- S. variabilis (Ellis & Everh.) Kuntze (1898) = Chaetoplea variabilis, Phaeosphaeriaceae
- S. vilis (Fr.) G. Winter (1885) = Melanomma vile, Melanommataceae
- S. vitalbae (De Not.) Kuntze (1898) = Pleospora vitalbae, Pleosporaceae
- S. vitalbae var. minor (Sacc.) Koshk. (1973) = Pleospora vitalbae, Pleosporaceae
