= Dilophospora alopecuri =

Scientific classification
- Kingdom: Fungi
- Division: Ascomycota
- Class: Dothideomycetes
- Genus: Dilophospora
- Species: D. alopecuri

Binomial name
- Dilophospora alopecuri (Fr.) Fr., (1849)

Synonyms
- Dilophospora graminis Desm., (1840); Dilophospora graminis f. holci (Fuckel) Fuckel, (1870); Dilophospora holci Fuckel, (1861); Kellermania caricis Golovin, (1950); Sphaeria alopecuri Fr., (1828)

Species of fungus

Dilophospora alopecuri is a plant pathogen infecting rye and wheat.
