= Bartalinia robillardoides =

Scientific classification
- Kingdom: Fungi
- Division: Ascomycota
- Class: Sordariomycetes
- Order: Amphisphaeriales
- Family: Sporocadaceae
- Genus: Bartalinia
- Species: B. robillardoides

Binomial name
- Bartalinia robillardoides Tassi, 1900

Synonyms
- Seimatosporium robillardoides (Tassi) Arx, Gen. Fungi Sporul. Cult., Edn 3 (Vaduz): 224 (1981)

Species of fungus

Bartalinia robillardoides is a species of fungi within the genus Bartalinia and the Sporocadaceae family. Distinguished by their unitunicate asci, containing 3-4 septate, Bartalinia robillardoides species have been found in water samples and growing on medium like flowering shrubs and trees. Collections of this species have been collected in Australia and New Zealand, Europe, South America and Asia. It has been identified to be both endophytic and pathogenic. This species can cause leaf spots that raise concerns to economically valuable plants.

== Description ==
Bartalinia robillardoides, has a flask shaped fruiting body, with fusiform candida, and unitunicate asci. Each ascospore has 3-4 septate, differentiating itself from the Amphisphaerales order of only having 1-septate ascospores. There is no known sexual morph of the species Bartalinia robillardoides. The cell walls of the fruiting structure are dark to light brown in color moving from the outside of the wall into the conidial hymenium. The cell wall was measured to be 40μm thick and the conidia 10-15μm in length. The conidia itself has basal and apical appendages. The basal appendage is a single, unbranched, filiform structure whereas the apical appendage is split into three divergent structures. These appendages rang from 4-7μm long

== Habitat ==
This species is foliicolous, found growing on leaf vegetation, stem of medicinal plants, and dead aerial spines of Rosa canina. It has been identified as endophytic on the lead of Psidium guajava, but also recognized as a pathogen as it has been seen to cause leaf spotting. Since this species has not been detected on economically valuable crops, there is minimal effort in ridding the fungal species from the plants. The first freshwater sample of this species was collected in 2019 from the Nakdong river, Yeongsan river, and a pond in Korea.

== Bioactive compounds ==
Bartalinia robillardoides has been successfully isolated and cultured in a lab on potato dextrose agar. This species is studied for its production of secondary metabolites like the production of taxol, an anticancer drug, and another antimicrobial compound identified as chlorazaphilone. Chloraziphilone has antimicrobial properties toward Bacillus subtilis, Staphylococcus lentus, Candida albicans, Trichophyton rubrum, and Septoria tritici.
