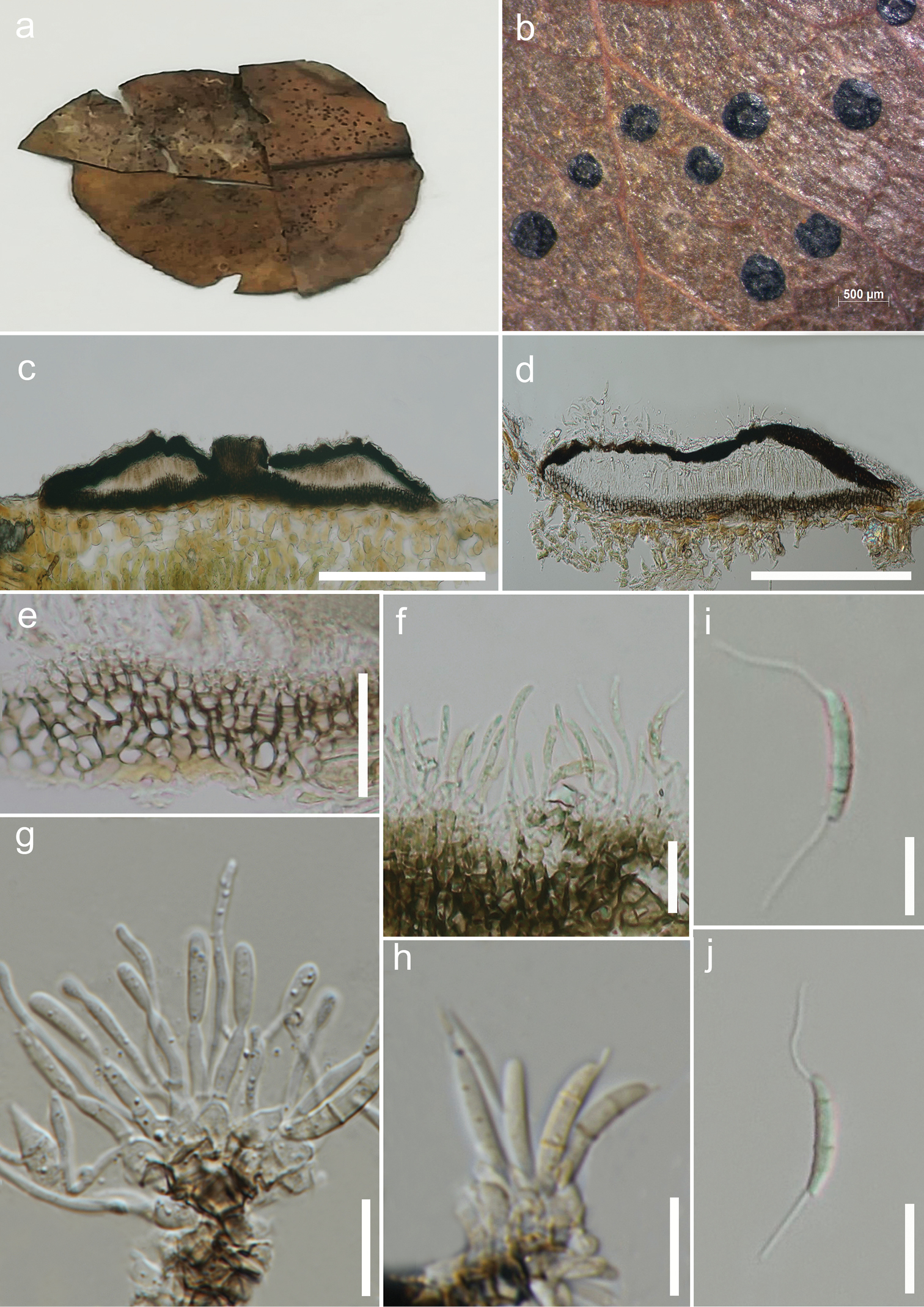
- Herbarium specimens of Discosia ravennica

Scientific classification
- Kingdom: Fungi
- Division: Ascomycota
- Class: Sordariomycetes
- Order: Amphisphaeriales
- Family: Sporocadaceae
- Genus: Discosia; Lib. (1837)

Type species
- Discosia artocreas (Tode) Fr. (1849)

= Discosia =

Genus of fungi

Discosia is a genus of plant pathogens in the family Sporocadaceae.

It was published by Marie-Anne Libert in 1837.

The genus was re-studied by Subramanian and Reddy (1974), who designated Discosia strobilina Lib. ex Sacc. as lectotype for the genus (Nag Raj 1993; Tanaka et al. 2011). Later, when Sphaeria artocreas Tode was transferred to the genus and combined under Discosia artocreas (Tode) Fr., the latter was chosen as lectotype of the genus (Fries 1849; Vanev 1991).

Vanev (1991, 1992a, b, c, d) made a detailed taxonomic revision of the genus. On the basis of the location of the conidial septa and appendages, he delimited six sections (Vanev 1991), and to clarify the status of the genus he designated its lectotype as Discosia artocreas (Tode: Fr.) Fr. (Vanev 1992a).

In 2015, Senanayake, Indunil C.; Maharachchikumbura, Sajeewa S. N. et al. (2015) moved the genus to its own family Discosiaceae Maharachch. & K.D. Hyde 2015. But in 2016, it was moved back into the family Sporocadaceae.

== Hosts ==
Discosia rhododendricola sp.nov, Neopestalotiopsis rhododendricola sp.nov and Diaporthe nobilis were new asexual fungal species found in 2022 on Rhododendron spp. in Kunming, Yunnan Province in China. Discosia strobilina has been found on various rhododendron species (including Rhododendron arboreum and Rhododendron campulatum) as leaf spots on dead and living leaves in Mexico, Europe, India and Japan. Discosia vagans was found on fallen leaves and dead stems on various rhododendron species in Italy and India. In Poland species of Discosia were found on 12 host plants including Anemone nemorosa L., Galium odoratum (L.) Scop., Gymnocarpium dryopteris (L.) Newman, Moehringia trinervia (L.) Clairv., Mycelis muralis (L.) Dumort., Oxalis acetosella L., Tilia cordata Mill. and Viola reichenbachiana Jord. ex Boreau. Discosia artocreas has been found in America on Cercis canadensis, Magnolia glauca and Aralia spinosa. In Alabama, USA species Discosia artocreas was found on Prunus serotina and Acer rubrum. Discosia italica and Discosia fagi were found on the dead leaves of Fagus sylvatica in Italy.

Discosia rubi has been trialled as treatment for human pathogen Cryptococcus neoformans.

== Distribution ==
It has a wide scattered cosmopolitan distribution; it is found in the USA, Mexico, Europe, (including Italy, and Poland,) India, Japan, Thailand, China, and New Zealand.

== Species ==
As accepted by Species Fungorum;

- Discosia alboferruginea (Ellis & Everh.) Vanev (1995)
- Discosia aquatica Fautrey (1893)
- Discosia artocreas (Tode) Fr. (1849)
- Discosia arxii Vanev (1993)
- Discosia baarnensis Vanev (1982)
- Discosia biciliata Gonz. Frag. (1917)
- Discosia bombycina T.S. Viswan. (1960)
- Discosia brasiliensis (Speg.) Nag Raj (1993)
- Discosia caffra Matsush. (1996)
- Discosia castaneae C.M. Tian & N. Jiang (2021)
- Discosia ceanothi (A.W. Ramaley) Nag Raj (1993)
- Discosia celtidis Tennakoon, C.H. Kuo & K.D. Hyde (2021)
- Discosia eucalypticola Nag Raj (1994)
- Discosia fagi W.J. Li, Jian K. Liu & K.D. Hyde (2015)
- Discosia fici Tennakoon, C.H. Kuo & K.D. Hyde (2021)
- Discosia fraxinea (Schwein.) Nag Raj (1993)
- Discosia himalayensis Died. (1916)
- Discosia hiptages Tilak (1960)
- Discosia italica W.J. Li, Jian K. Liu & K.D. Hyde (2015)
- Discosia jambolanae S. Ahmad (1961)
- Discosia jordanovii Vanev (1993)
- Discosia julia Speg. (1881)
- Discosia lauricola Nag Raj (1993)
- Discosia ludwigii Vanev (1992)
- Discosia macrozamiae Crous (2018)
- Discosia maculiformis Syd. & P. Syd. (1914)
- Discosia neofraxinea W.J. Li, Camporesi & K.D. Hyde (2015)
- Discosia nobilis Petr. (1951)
- Discosia novae-zelandiae Nag Raj (1993)
- Discosia petrakii Vanev (1995)
- Discosia pini Heald (1909)
- Discosia pleurochaeta Durieu & Mont. (1849)
- Discosia poikilomera Fairm. (1923)
- Discosia poonensis Kalani (1966)
- Discosia pseudoartocreas Crous & Damm (2013)
- Discosia pseudoceanothi Wijayaw., Camporesi, Bhat & K.D. Hyde (2016)
- Discosia pseudopleurochaeta Wijayaw., Camporesi & K.D. Hyde (2015)
- Discosia pyri Koshk. (1961)
- Discosia querci Jayasiri, E.B.G. Jones & K.D. Hyde (2018)
- Discosia ravennica Bundhun, Jeewon, Camporesi, J.C. Kang & K.D. Hyde (2021)
- Discosia rosae Edward, Kr.P. Singh, S.C. Tripathi, M.K. Sinha & Ranade (1974)
- Discosia rubi F. Liu, L. Cai & Crous (2018)
- Discosia sampaioi Gonz. Frag. (1924)
- Discosia spegazzinii Vanev (1998)
- Discosia strobilina Lib. ex Sacc. (1884)
- Discosia subramanianii Vanev (1992)
- Discosia syzygii Mhaskar & V.G. Rao (1976)
- Discosia tamarindi Phadke & V.G. Rao (1977)
- Discosia tenzingii Lacy (1958)
- Discosia tillandsiae Vanev (1992)
- Discosia tricellularis (Okane, Nakagiri & Tad. Ito) F. Liu, L. Cai & Crous (2018)
- Discosia vagans De Not. (1849)
- Discosia yakushimensis (Kaz. Tanaka, Okane & Hosoya) F. Liu, L. Cai & Crous (2018)

Former species;

- D. alnea (Pers.) Berk. (1860) = Asteroma alneum, Gnomoniaceae
- D. artocreas f. camphorae Sacc. (1881) = Discosia artocreas,
- D. artocreas var. aceris Desm. (1853) = Discosia artocreas),
- D. artocreas var. betulae Desm. (1853) = Discosia artocreas),
- D. artocreas var. brasiliensis Speg. (1918) = Discosia brasiliensis,
- D. artocreas var. camphorae Sacc. (1881) = Discosia artocreas,
- D. artocreas var. carpini Desm. (1853) = Discosia artocreas,
- D. artocreas var. coryli Desm. (1853) = Discosia artocreas,
- D. artocreas var. fagi Desm. (1853) = Discosia artocreas,
- D. artocreas var. juglandis C. Massal. (1908) = Discosia artocreas,
- D. artocreas var. mespili Desm. (1853) = Discosia artocreas,
- D. artocreas var. platani Desm. (1853) = Discosia artocreas,
- D. artocreas var. populi Desm. (1853) = Discosia artocreas,
- D. artocreas var. quercina Desm. (1853) = Discosia artocreas,
- D. artocreas var. sibirica Sacc. (1896) = Discosia artocreas,
- D. artocreas var. tremulae Desm. (1853) = Discosia artocreas,
- D. artocreas var. ulmi Desm. (1853) = Discosia artocreas,
- D. clypeata (De Not.) Sacc. (1842) = Anthostomella clypeata, Xylariaceae
- D. clypeata f. rosae Sacc. (1882) = Anthostomella clypeata, Xylariaceae
- D. cynosbati Fuckel (1864) = Seimatosporium rosae, Sporocadaceae
- D. eucalypti (Pat.) Nag Raj (1993) = Immersidiscosia eucalypti, Amphisphaeriaceae
- D. grammita Berk. & M.A. Curtis (1873) = Seimatosporium grammitum, Sporocadaceae
- D. ignobilis Fautrey (1890) = Seimatosporium ignobilis, Sporocadaceae
- D. impressa (Fr.) Fr. (1849) = Diplocarpon impressum, Drepanopezizaceae
- D. minima Berk. & M.A. Curtis (1874) = Mycoleptodiscus minimus, Magnaporthaceae
- D. passerinii Sacc. (1884) = Seimatosporium tostum, Sporocadaceae
- D. punicae Shreem. & M. Reddy (1971) = Monochaetia punicae, Amphisphaeriaceae
