= Seimatosporium =

Scientific classification
- Kingdom: Fungi
- Division: Ascomycota
- Class: Sordariomycetes
- Order: Amphisphaeriales
- Family: Sporocadaceae
- Genus: Seimatosporium; Corda, in Sturm, Deutschl. Fl., 3 Abt. (Pilze Deutschl.) 3(13): 79 (1833)

Synonyms
- Amphichaeta McAlpine, Proc. Linn. Soc. N.S.W. 29: 118 (1904); Basipilus Subram., Proc. Natl. Inst. Sci. India, B, Biol. Sci. 27: 243 (1961); Clethridium (Sacc.) Sacc. [as 'Clathridium'], Syll. fung. (Abellini) 11: 350 (in clave), 729 (1895); Coryneopsis Grove, J. Bot., Lond. 70: 33 (1933) [1932]; Cryptostictis Fuckel, Fungi rhenani exsic.: no. 1838 (1866); Curreya sect. Curreyella Sacc., Syll. fung. (Abellini) 11: 379 (1895); Curreyella (Sacc.) Lindau, in Engler & Prantl, Nat. Pflanzenfam., Teil. I (Leipzig) 1(1): 379 (1897); Diploceras (Sacc.) Died., Mykol. Untersuch. Ber.: 342 (1915); Disaeta Bonar, Mycologia 20(5): 299 (1928); Discostroma Clem., Gen. fung. (Minneapolis): 50 (1909); Discostromopsis H.J. Swart, Trans. Br. mycol. Soc. 73(2): 217 (1979); Dochmolopha Cooke, Nuovo G. bot. ital. 10(1): 25 (1878); Fenestella subg. Clethridium Sacc., Syll. fung. (Abellini) 2: 332 (1883); Griphosphaeria Höhn., Annls mycol. 16(1/2): 87 (1918); Hyaloceras subg. Diploceras Sacc., Syll. fung. (Abellini) 10: 484 (1892); Labridium Vestergr., Öfvers. Finska Vetensk.-Soc. Förh. 54(no. 1): 43 (1897); Leptocoryneum Petr., Hedwigia 65: 278 (1925); Monoceras Guba, Monograph of Monochaetia and Pestalotia: 290 (1961); Neobroomella Petr., Sydowia 1(1-3): 5 (1947); Paradidymella Petr., Annls mycol. 25(3/4): 237 (1927); Phragmodothella Theiss. & Syd., Annls mycol. 13(3/4): 343 (1915); Sarcostroma Cooke, Journal of the Quekett microsc. Club 2: 267 (1871); Sciniatosporium Kalchbr. ex Morgan-Jones, Can. J. Bot. 49(6): 994 (1971); Sciniatosporium Kalchbr., Fungi europ. (Alassio) cent. 10: no. 985 (1866); Seiridina Höhn., Mitt. bot. Inst. tech. Hochsch. Wien 7(1): 31 (1930); Sporocadus Corda, Icon. fung. (Prague) 3: 23 (1839); Vermisporium H.J. Swart & M.A. Will., Trans. Br. mycol. Soc. 81(3): 491 (1983)

Genus of fungi

Seimatosporium is a fungus genus within the family Sporocadaceae.

They are saprobic or pathogenic on plants, and are called 'pestalotioid fungi'. Seimatosporium physocarpi was found in Russia on the dead branches of Physocarpus opulifolius and Seimatosporium rosae was found on Rosa kalmiussica Chrshan. & Lasebna.

Due to morphological and DNA sequence data several species within the genus has been transferred to other genera within the family.

== Species ==
As accepted by Species Fungorum;

- Seimatosporium alneum Nag Raj (1986)
- Seimatosporium anomalum (Harkn.) Shoemaker (1964)
- Seimatosporium azaleae Okane, Nakagiri & Tad. Ito (1996)
- Seimatosporium berberidicola (Vassiljevsky) Nag Raj (1986)
- Seimatosporium berckmansii (Milbrath) B. Sutton (1975)
- Seimatosporium botan Sat. Hatak. & Y. Harada (2004)
- Seimatosporium cadicola (B. Sutton) Shoemaker (1964)
- Seimatosporium caninum (Brunaud) B. Sutton (1975)
- Seimatosporium cassiopes (Rostr.) B. Sutton (1975)
- Seimatosporium caudatum (Preuss) Shoemaker (1964)
- Seimatosporium ciliatum (Petr.) Hongsanan & K.D. Hyde (2018)
- Seimatosporium consocium (Peck) Shoemaker (1964)
- Seimatosporium corni Wijayaw., Camporesi & K.D. Hyde (2015)
- Seimatosporium cornicola
- Seimatosporium daviesiae (McAlpine) Shoemaker (1964)
- Seimatosporium discosioides (Ellis & Everh.) Shoemaker (1964)
- Seimatosporium effusum (Vestergr.) Shoemaker (1964)
- Seimatosporium etheridgei A. Funk (1978)
- Seimatosporium fici Dayar., Phook. & K.D. Hyde (2015)
- Seimatosporium foliicola (Berk.) Shoemaker (1964)
- Seimatosporium germanicum F. Liu, L. Cai & Crous (2018)
- Seimatosporium glandigenum (Bubák & Gonz. Frag.) B. Sutton (1975)
- Seimatosporium grammitum (Berk. & M.A. Curtis) Nag Raj (1991)
- Seimatosporium grevilleae (Loos) Shoemaker (1964)
- Seimatosporium hakeae (B. Sutton) Shoemaker (1964)
- Seimatosporium hebeiense W.P. Wu (1992)
- Seimatosporium hollosii (Tóth) Shoemaker (1964)
- Seimatosporium hypericinum (Ces.) B. Sutton (1975)
- Seimatosporium hysterioides (Fuckel) Brockmann (1976)
- Seimatosporium ignobilis (Fautrey) Vanev (1998)
- Seimatosporium italicum Q.J. Shang & K.D. Hyde (2017)
- Seimatosporium kennediae (McAlpine) Shoemaker (1964)
- Seimatosporium ledi Piroz. & Shoemaker (1970)
- Seimatosporium leucopogonis H.J. Swart (1979)
- Seimatosporium lonicerae (Cooke) Shoemaker (1964)
- Seimatosporium luteosporum D.P. Lawr. & Travadon (2018)
- Seimatosporium macrospermum (Berk. & Broome) B. Sutton (1975)
- Seimatosporium mariae (Clinton) Shoemaker (1964)
- Seimatosporium massarina (Sacc.) Jaklitsch & Voglmayr (2016)
- Seimatosporium missionum (Speg.) B. Sutton (1975)
- Seimatosporium monochaetioides (Speg.) B. Sutton (1975)
- Seimatosporium muehlenbeckiae (McAlpine) H.J. Swart (1979)
- Seimatosporium nipponicum Matsush. (1995)
- Seimatosporium parasiticum (Dearn. & House) Shoemaker (1964)
- Seimatosporium pestalozzioides (Sacc.) B. Sutton (1975)
- Seimatosporium pezizoides (Ellis & Everh.) B. Sutton (1975)
- Seimatosporium physocarpi Norph., Bulgakov & K.D. Hyde (2015)
- Seimatosporium piceae G.Z. Wang (1985)
- Seimatosporium pistaciae Crous & Mirab. (2014)
- Seimatosporium pleurochaetum (Speg.) Arx (1981)
- Seimatosporium pseudocorni Wijayaw., Camporesi & K.D. Hyde (2016)
- Seimatosporium pseudoglandigenum Wijayaw. & Camporesi (2016)
- Seimatosporium pseudorosae Wijayaw., Camporesi & K.D. Hyde (2016)
- Seimatosporium pseudorosarum Wijayaw., Camporesi & K.D. Hyde (2015)
- Seimatosporium rhododendri (Schwein.) Piroz. & Shoemaker (1970)
- Seimatosporium rhombisporum Senan., Camporesi & K.D. Hyde (2015)
- Seimatosporium ribis-alpini (Fautrey) Shoemaker & E. Müll. (1964)
- Seimatosporium rosae Corda (1833)
- Seimatosporium rosigenum Goonas., Camporesi & K.D. Hyde (2018)
- Seimatosporium rossicum Nag Raj & Melnik (1990)
- Seimatosporium salicinum (Corda) Nag Raj (1993)
- Seimatosporium soli F. Liu, L. Cai & Crous (2018)
- Seimatosporium sublunatum B. Sutton (1964)
- Seimatosporium tostum (Berk. & Broome) Rossman & W.C. Allen (2016)
- Seimatosporium vaccinii (Fuckel) B. Erikss. (1974)
- Seimatosporium vitifusiforme D.P. Lawr. & Travadon (2018)
- Seimatosporium vitis Y.P. Xiao, Camporesi & K.D. Hyde (2015)
- Seimatosporium vitis-viniferae F. Liu, L. Cai & Crous (2018)

Former species (all in family Sporocadaceae, unless listed);

- S. acerinum (Bäumler) B. Sutton (1975) = Sporocadus acerinus
- S. acutum (H.J. Swart & M.A. Will.) P.A. Barber & Crous (2011) = Allelochaeta acuta
- S. arbuti (Bonar) Shoemaker (1964) = Disaeta arbuti
- S. biseptatum (H.J. Swart & M.A. Will.) P.A. Barber & Crous (2011) = Allelochaeta biseptata
- S. brevicentrum (H.J. Swart & M.A. Will.) P.A. Barber & Crous (2011) = Allelochaeta brevicentra
- S. brevilatum H.J. Swart & D.A. Griffiths (1974) = Allelochaeta brevilata
- S. cornicola Wijayaw. & Camporesi (2016) = Sporocadus cornicola
- S. cylindrosporum H.J. Swart (1982) = Allelochaeta cylindrospora
- S. dacicum (Săvul. & Hulea) B. Sutton (1975) = Sporocadus dacicus
- S. dilophosporum (Cooke) B. Sutton (1964) = Allelochaeta dilophospora
- S. elegans H.J. Swart (1979) = Allelochaeta elegans
- S. eucalypti (McAlpine) H.J. Swart (1982) = Allelochaeta eucalypti
- S. falcatum (B. Sutton) Shoemaker (1964) = Allelochaeta falcata
- S. fusisporum H.J. Swart & D.A. Griffiths (1974) = Allelochaeta fusispora
- S. kriegerianum (Bres.) Morgan-Jones & B. Sutton (1964) = Allelochaeta kriegeriana
- S. laurinum (Mont. ex Desm.) Arx (1981) = Bartalinia laurina
- S. leptospermi R.G. Bagn. & Sheridan (1972) = Discostroma leptospermi
- S. lichenicola (Corda) Shoemaker & E. Müll. (1964) = Discostroma corticola
- S. obtusum (H.J. Swart & M.A. Will.) P.A. Barber & Crous (2011) = Allelochaeta obtusa
- S. orbiculare (Cooke) P.A. Barber & Crous (2011) = Allelochaeta orbicularis
- S. passerinii (Sacc.) Brockmann (1976) = Seimatosporium tostum
- S. quercinum Goonas., R.K. Schumach. & K.D. Hyde (2016) = Xenoseimatosporium quercinum
- S. rhododendri G.Z. Wang (1983) = Sarcostroma sinicum
- S. robillardoides (Tassi) Arx (1981) = Bartalinia robillardoides
- S. rosarum (Henn.) B. Sutton (1975) = Sporocadus rosarum
- S. rosicola Wanas., Goonas., Camporesi & K.D. Hyde (2018) = Sporocadus rosigena
- S. saksenaense (S.S. Singh) Arx (1981) = Doliomyces saksenaensis, Amphisphaeriaceae
- S. samuelii (Hansf.) J. Walker & H.J. Swart (1988) = Allelochaeta samuelii
- S. senegalense (Speg.) Arx (1981) = Doliomyces senegalensis, Amphisphaeriaceae
- S. sorbi Wijayaw., Camporesi & K.D. Hyde (2015) = Sporocadus sorbi
- S. verrucisporum (Nag Raj) P.A. Barber & Crous (2011) = Allelochaeta verrucispora
- S. walkeri (H.J. Swart & M.A. Will.) P.A. Barber & Crous (2011) = Allelochaeta walkeri
