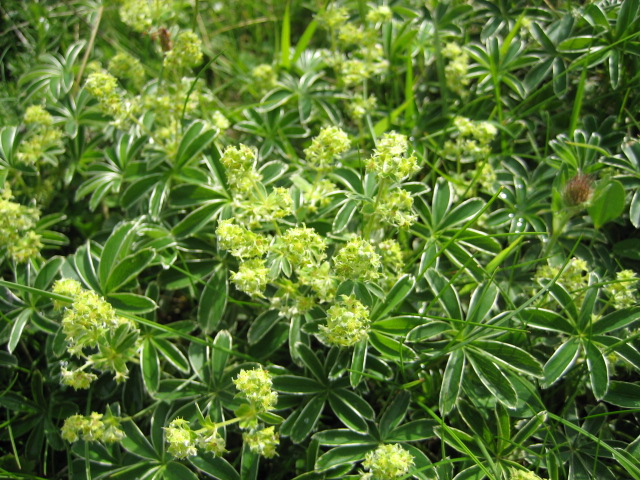

Scientific classification
- Kingdom: Plantae
- Clade: Tracheophytes
- Clade: Angiosperms
- Clade: Eudicots
- Clade: Rosids
- Order: Rosales
- Family: Rosaceae
- Genus: Alchemilla
- Species: A. alpina

Binomial name
- Alchemilla alpina L.

= Alchemilla alpina =

Species of flowering plant

Alchemilla alpina, commonly known as alpine lady's-mantle, is an arctic-montane herbaceous perennial plant native to Europe and Southern Greenland.

Alpine lady's-mantle has been used for centuries as an herbal remedy, and is used in horticulture as a ground cover and in rock gardens.

== Description ==
Alpine lady's-mantle is a perennial plant with a woody rhizome growing to a height of between 5 and 20 cm (2 and 8 in). The weak stems are silkily hairy and grow from a basal rosette and the leaves are palmate with about seven lanceolate leaflets with toothed tips, smooth above and densely hairy underneath. There are alternate pairs of leaves on the stems and the inflorescence forms a dense cyme. The flowers are lime green with four sepals, no petals, four stamens and a solitary carpel. They are hermaphrodite and the seeds develop apomictically without being fertilised. The flowers begin to bloom in June and fade in September and their seeds can be collected from August to October.

Because the seeds develop without cross fertilisation, any mutations that may occur gradually cause cumulative changes to populations and there are a great many very similar species of lady's-mantle, sometimes called micro-species. Alpine lady's-mantle is easily distinguished from other lady's-mantles by the fact that its leaves have clearly separate leaflets while other species have neatly pleated leaves.

== Distribution and habitat ==
Alpine lady's-mantle grows in northern Europe and in mountainous regions further south such as the Alps and the Pyrenees. It also grows in southern Greenland. Its natural habitat is moorland, alpine meadows, cliffs, stream banks and areas covered in drifts of snow during the winter.

== Ecology ==
Alchemilla alpina is a known host to numerous species of fungi. These include:

- Botrytis cinerea
- Discosia artocreas
- Leptosphaerulina vitrea
- Mycosphaerella vulgaris
- Naeviopsis arctica
- Phoma alchemillae
- Ramularia alpina
