= Dilophospora =

Scientific classification
- Kingdom: Fungi
- Division: Ascomycota
- Class: Dothideomycetes
- Genus: Dilophospora; Desm.

Genus of fungi

Dilophospora is a genus of fungi belonging to the order Dothideomycetes, in the family Sporocadaceae.

The species of this genus are found in Europe, Japan, northern America and Australia.

Species:

- Dilophospora alopecuri (Fr.) Fr. (1849)
- Dilophospora stiparum Speg. (1902)

Former species;

- D. albida Massee & Crossl. (1904) = Ciliospora albida, Sebacinaceae
- D. caricum (Desm.) Fuckel (1870) = Neottiospora caricum, Ascomycota
- D. chilensis Speg. (1910) = Plectronidiopsis chilensis, Ascomycota
- D. geranii J. Schröt. (1880) = Neottiospora geranii, Ascomycota
- D. graminis Desm. (1840) = Dilophospora alopecuri, Dothideomycetes
- D. graminis Fuckel (1870) = Lidophia graminis, Dothideomycetes
- D. graminis f. holci (Fuckel) Fuckel (1870) = Dilophospora alopecuri, Dothideomycetes
- D. holci Fuckel (1861) = Dilophospora alopecuri, Dothideomycetes
