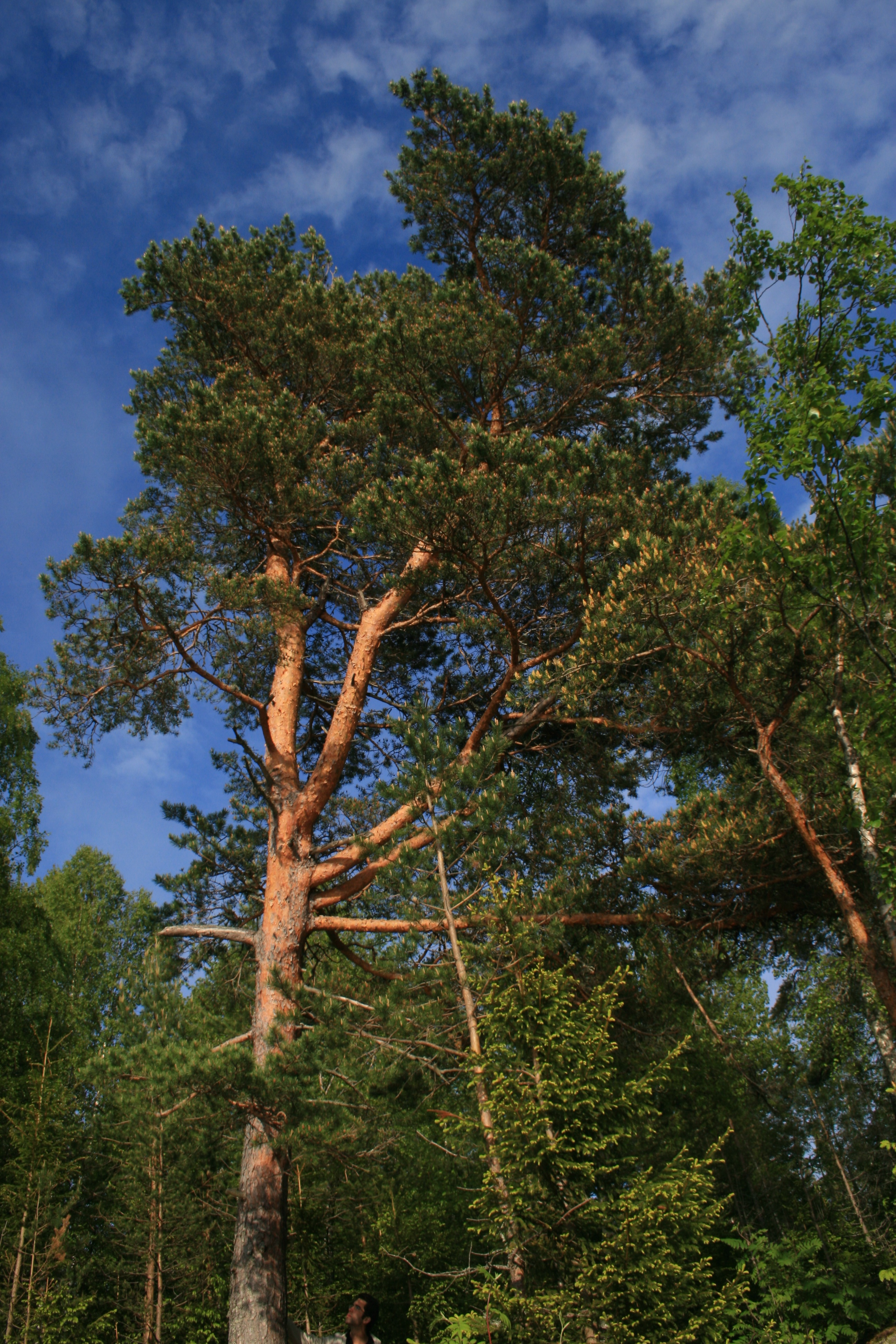

Conservation status
- Least Concern (IUCN 3.1)

Scientific classification
- Kingdom: Plantae
- Clade: Tracheophytes
- Clade: Gymnosperms
- Division: Pinophyta
- Class: Pinopsida
- Order: Pinales
- Family: Pinaceae
- Genus: Pinus
- Subgenus: P. subg. Pinus
- Section: P. sect. Pinus
- Subsection: P. subsect. Pinus
- Species: P. sylvestris

Binomial name
- Pinus sylvestris L.

- Native range ✖ Isolated population Introduced and naturalized (synanthropic) area ▲ Isolated population

= Pinus sylvestris =

Scots pine

Species of conifer

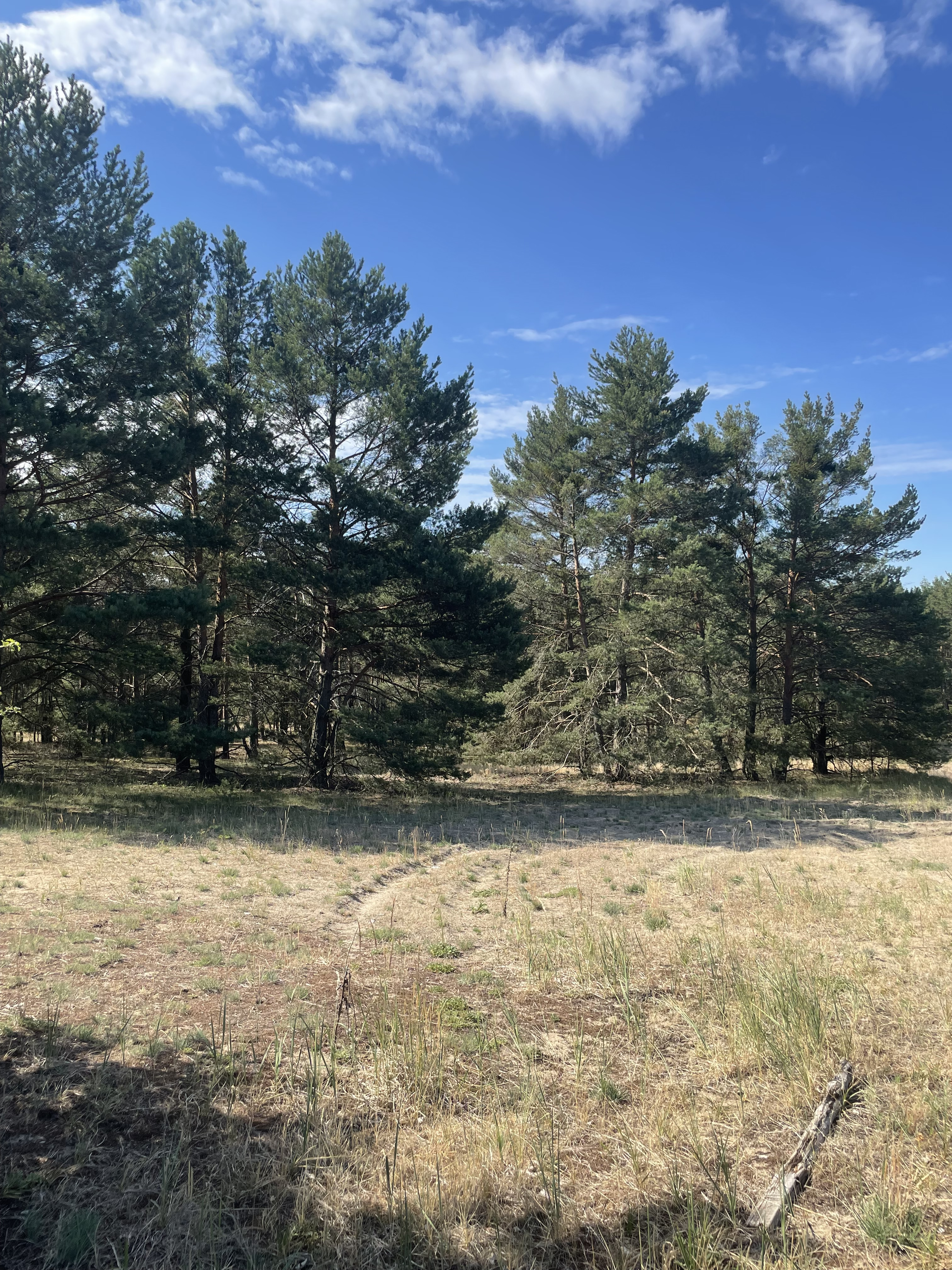
A natural stand of Pinus sylvestris (Scot's pine) in Šranecké piesky, Slovakia

Pinus sylvestris is a species of conifer, a pine, in the family Pinaceae. It is native to Eurasia. It is known as the Scots pine in English, alternatively as the Scotch pine in the United States, and occasionally the Baltic pine or European red pine. It can readily be identified by its combination of fairly short, blue-green leaves and orange-red bark.

== Names ==
Before the 18th century, the species was more often known as Scots fir or Scotch fir. Another, less common name is European redwood.

The timber from it is also called red deal or yellow deal. It is named after the deal, an obsolete unit of measurement for wood.

== Description ==
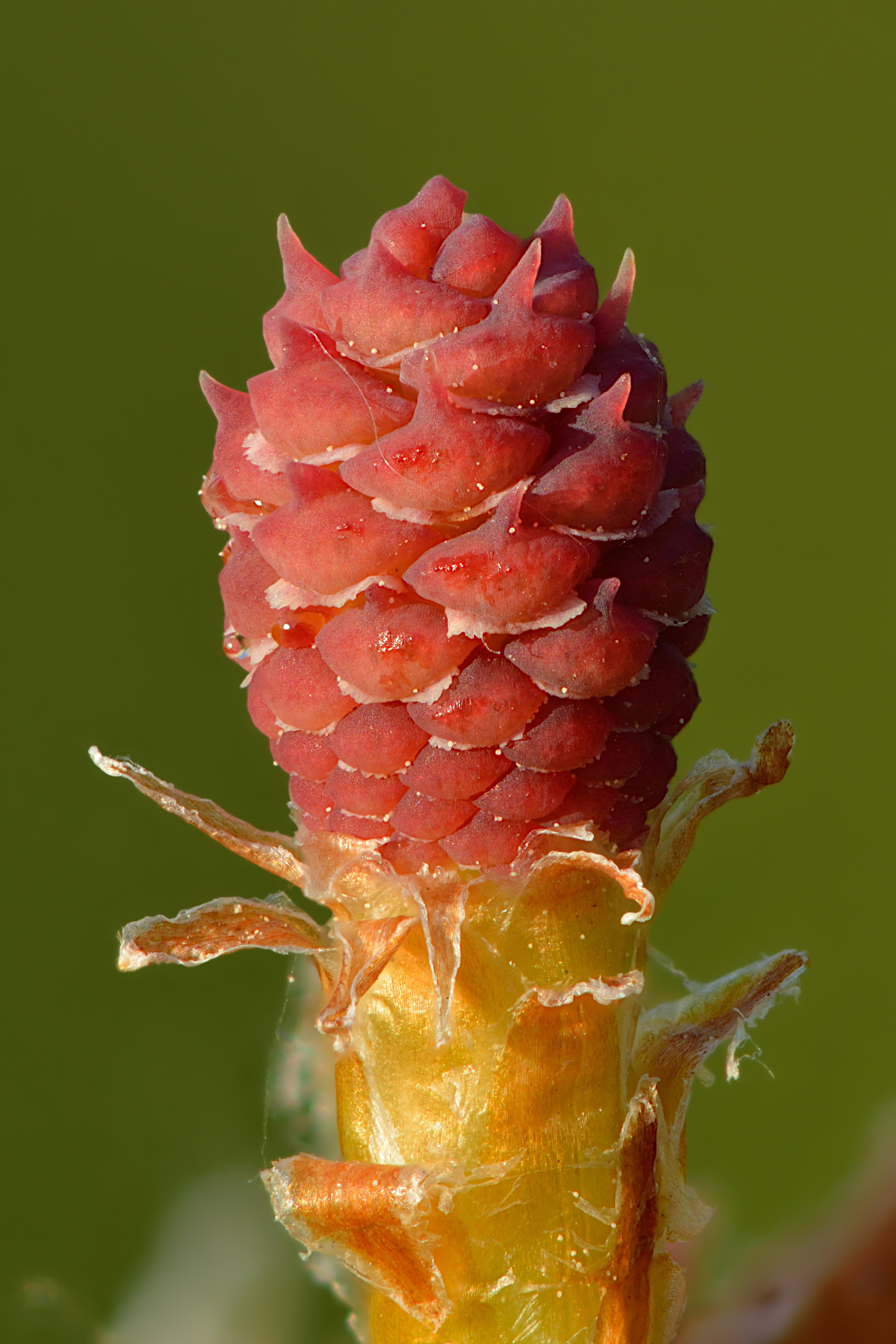
Young female cone

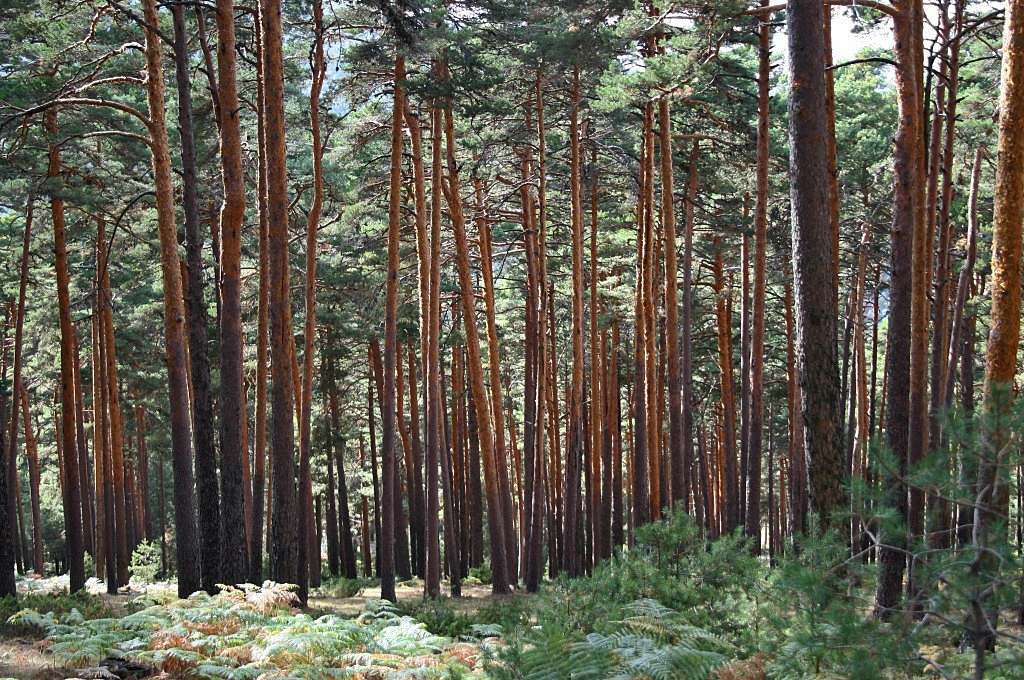
Pinus sylvestris forest in Sierra de Guadarrama, central Spain

Pinus sylvestris is an ancient species of coniferous tree. A fossil seed cone of Pinus montana fossilis sent by the Naturmuseum Senckenberg to the Swedish Museum of Natural History was dated to the late Pliocene epoch (Reuverian stage ~ 2.6 million years ago). Its longevity might be due to its genetics. Genes of Scots Pine during the haploid stage of its life cycle are subject to stronger negative selection. Selective removal of alleles that contain potentially unhelpful mutations has the efficacy of efficient natural selection.

Modern trees can grow up to 35 metres (115 feet) in height and 1 m (3 ft 3 in) in trunk diameter when mature, exceptionally over 45 m (148 ft) tall and 1.7 m (5 1/2 ft) in trunk diameter on very productive sites. The tallest on record is a tree over 210 years old growing in Estonia which stands at 46.6 m (153 ft). The lifespan is normally 150–300 years, with the oldest recorded specimens in Lapland, Northern Finland over 760 years.

The bark is thick, flaky and orange-red when young to scaly and gray-brown in maturity, sometimes retaining the former on the upper portion. The habit of the mature tree is distinctive due to its long, bare and straight trunk topped by a rounded or flat-topped mass of foliage.

The shoots are light brown, with a spirally arranged scale-like pattern. On mature trees the leaves ('needles') are a glaucous blue-green, often darker green to dark yellow-green in winter, 2.5–5 centimetres (1–2 inches) long and 1–2 millimetres (1/32–3/32 in) broad, produced in fascicles of two with a persistent gray 5–10 mm (1/4–3/8 in) basal sheath. On vigorous young trees the leaves can be twice as long, and occasionally occur in fascicles of three or four on the tips of strong shoots. Leaf persistence varies from two to four years in warmer climates, and up to nine years in subarctic regions. Seedlings up to one year old bear juvenile leaves; these are single (not in pairs), 2–3 cm (3/4–1 1/4 in) long, flattened, with a serrated margin.

The seed cones are red at pollination, then pale brown, globose and 4–8 mm (5/32–5/16 in) in diameter in their first year, expanding to full size in their second year, pointed ovoid-conic, green, then gray-green to yellow-brown at maturity, 3–7.5 cm (1 1/8–3 in) long. The cone scales have a flat to pyramidal apophysis (the external part of the cone scale), with a small prickle on the umbo (central boss or protuberance). The seeds are blackish, 3–5 mm (1/8–3/16 in) in length with a pale brown 12–20 mm (1/2–13/16 in) wing and are released when the cones open in spring 22–24 months after pollination. The pollen cones are yellow, occasionally pink, 8–12 mm (5/16–15/32 in) long; pollen release is in mid to late spring.

== Varieties ==
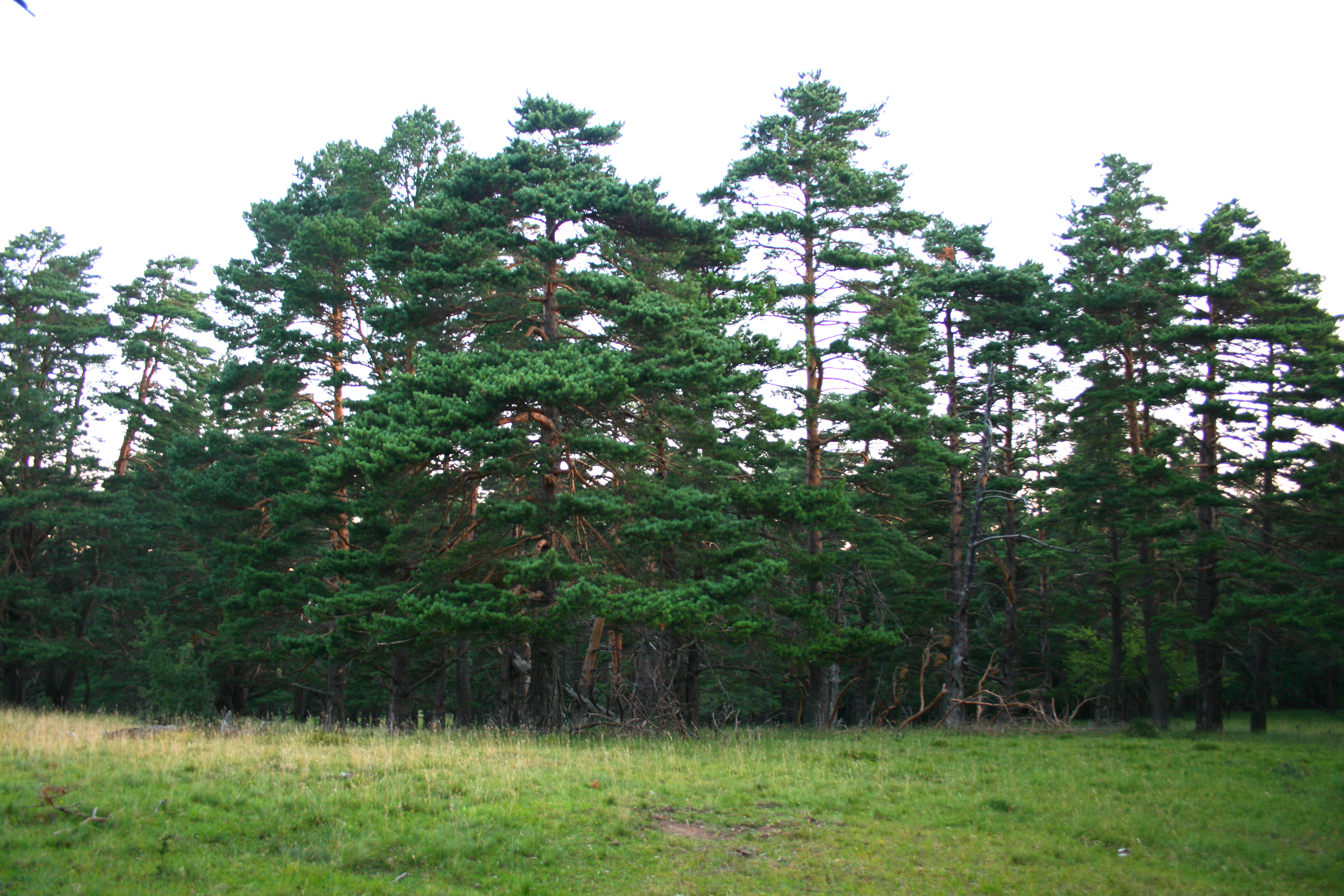
Pinus sylvestris var. hamata, Crimea

More than 100 Pinus sylvestris varieties have been described in the botanical literature, but only three or four are now accepted. They differ only minimally in morphology, but with more pronounced differences in genetic analysis and resin composition. Populations in westernmost Scotland are genetically distinct from those in the rest of Scotland and northern Europe, but not sufficiently to have been distinguished as separate botanical varieties. Trees in the far north of the range were formerly sometimes treated as var. lapponica, but the differences are clinal and it is not genetically distinct.

Image	Varieties	Description	Distribution
	Pinus sylvestris var. sylvestris L., 1753	Described above.	The bulk of the range, from Scotland and Spain to central Siberia.
	Pinus sylvestris var. hamata Steven	Foliage more consistently glaucous all year, not becoming duller in winter; cones more frequently with a pyramidal apophysis.	The Balkans, northern Turkey, Crimea, and the Caucasus.
	Pinus sylvestris var. mongolica Litv.	Foliage duller green, shoots gray-green; leaves occasionally up to 12 cm long.	Mongolia and adjoining parts of southern Siberia and northwestern China.
	Pinus sylvestris var. nevadensis D.H.Christ.	(not considered distinct from var. sylvestris by all authors) Kalenicz. Ex Kom. Cones often with thicker scales, but doubtfully distinguishable on morphology.	The Sierra Nevada in southern Spain and possibly other Spanish populations
	Pinus sylvestris var. cretacea Kalenicz. ex Kom.		From border regions between Russia and Ukraine.

== Distribution and habitat ==
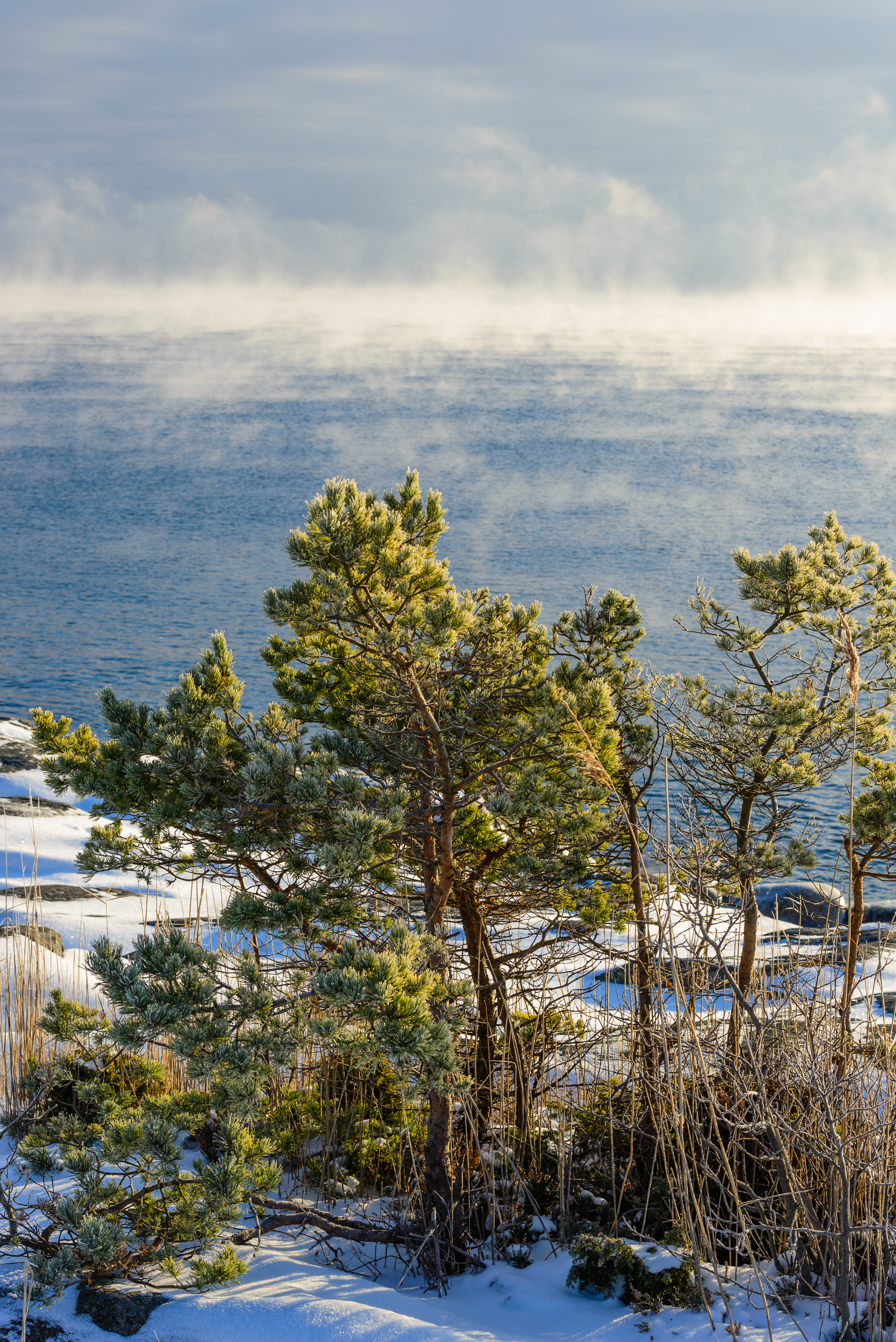
Scots pine in Stockholm archipelago, Sweden

Pinus sylvestris is the only pine native to northern Europe, ranging from Western Europe to Eastern Siberia, south to the Caucasus Mountains and Anatolia, and north to well inside the Arctic Circle in Fennoscandia. In the north of its range, it occurs from sea level to 1,000 m (3,300 ft), while in the south of its range it is a mountain tree, growing at 1,200–2,600 m (3,900–8,500 ft) altitude. Its distribution intersects with T. piniperda's habitat, making the beetle a primary pest of the tree.

The species is mainly found on poorer, sandy soils, rocky outcrops, peat bogs or close to the forest limit. On fertile sites, the pine is out-competed by other tree species, usually spruce or broad-leaved trees.

=== Britain and Ireland ===
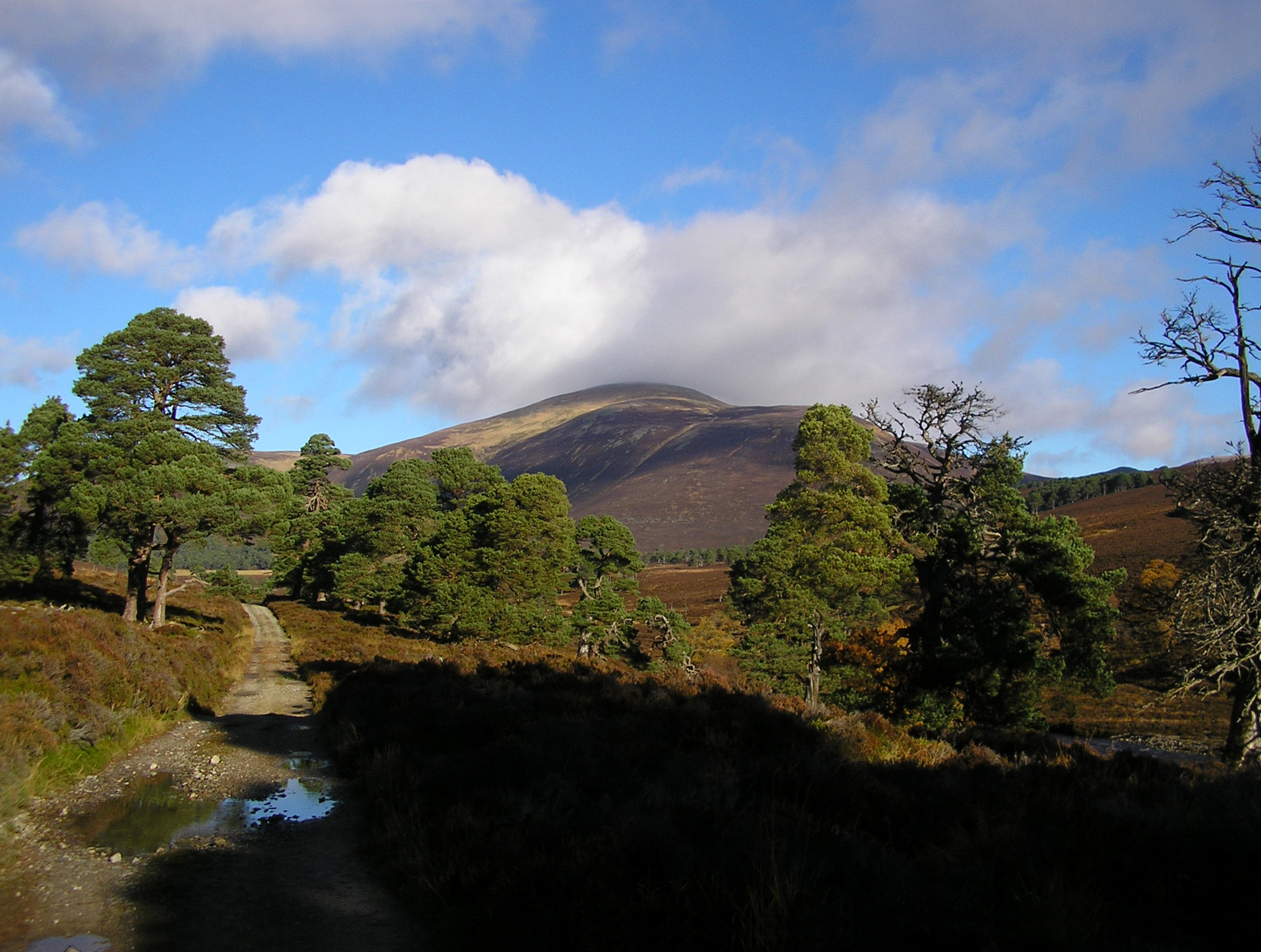
Scattered survivors (two recently dead) of extensive deforestation at Glen Quoich, Scotland

The tree spread across Britain and Ireland after the Last Glacial Maximum. Pollen records show that pine was present locally in southern England by 9,000 years ago having entered from northeast France and that it had spread as far north as the Lake District and North Pennines 500 years later.

It was present in Ireland over 8,800 years ago but absent from Wales at that time which suggests that the pine in Ireland had a separate Iberian origin or contained surviving populations, although evidence towards its survival is lacking. Pine expanded into Scotland between 8,000 and 8,500 years ago either from an independent refuge, from Scandinavia (via Doggerland) or from Ireland. As the climate warmed it became extinct from most of Britain and Ireland around 5,500 years ago except in Scotland, Kielder in England and The Burren in County Clare, Ireland.

The Irish and western Scottish populations went through a massive decline around 4,000 years ago which ultimately led to the practical extinction of the Irish population between 2,000 and 1,000 years ago. It was replaced by large areas of blanket bog in western Scotland and Ireland though the reasons for its decline and extinction in England are not clear, but it may have been influenced by human activities.

In Britain it now occurs naturally only in Scotland. Historical and archaeological records indicate that it also occurred in Wales and England until about 300–400 years ago, becoming extinct there due to over-exploitation and grazing; it has been re-introduced in these countries. Similar historical extinction and re-introduction applies to Ireland, Denmark and the Netherlands. Whether it truly became extinct in England is unknown. It has been speculated that it may have survived wild long enough for trees used in cultivation in England to derive from native (rather than imported) sources. Shakespeare (in Richard II) was familiar with the species in the 1590s, as was Evelyn in the early 1660s (Sylva), both around the time when the pine was thought to become extinct in England, but when landowners were also beginning ornamental and forestry planting.

The pine formed much of the Caledonian Forest, which once covered much of the Scottish Highlands. Overcutting for timber demand, fire, overgrazing by sheep and deer, and even deliberate clearance to deter wolves have all been factors in the decline of this once great pine and birch forest. Only comparatively small areas – 17,000 hectares (42,000 acres), only just over 1% of the estimated original 1,500,000 ha (3,700,000 acres) – of this ancient forest remain, the main surviving remnants being at Abernethy Forest, Glen Affric, Rothiemurchus Forest, and the Black Wood of Rannoch. Plans are currently in progress to restore at least some areas and work has started at key sites.

== Ecology ==
It forms either pure forests or mixes with Norway spruce, common juniper, silver birch, European rowan, Eurasian aspen and other hardwood species. In central and southern Europe, it occurs with numerous additional species, including European black pine, mountain pine, Macedonian pine, and Swiss pine. In the eastern part of its range, it occurs with Siberian pine, among others.

In 2020, black spot needle blight was found on hundreds of Pinus sylvestris var. mongolica trees in four forest farms in northeastern China. It first appeared on the upper part of the needles, and then the needles became withered and gradually showed light black spots, although they still remained green. As the fungal disease progressed, the needles eventually died and turned gray with many dark black spots. The fungus was identified as Heterotruncatella spartii (within the family Sporocadaceae) based on morphology and molecular methods.

== Uses ==
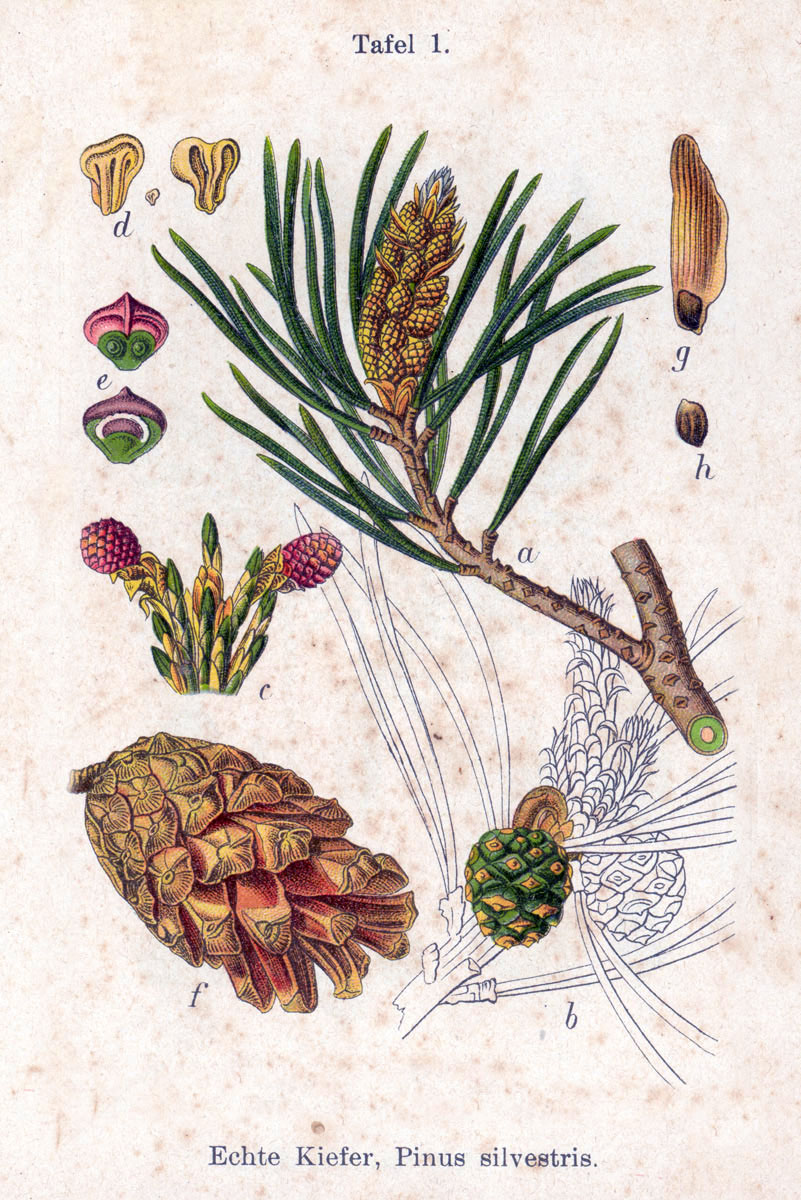
Botanical plate

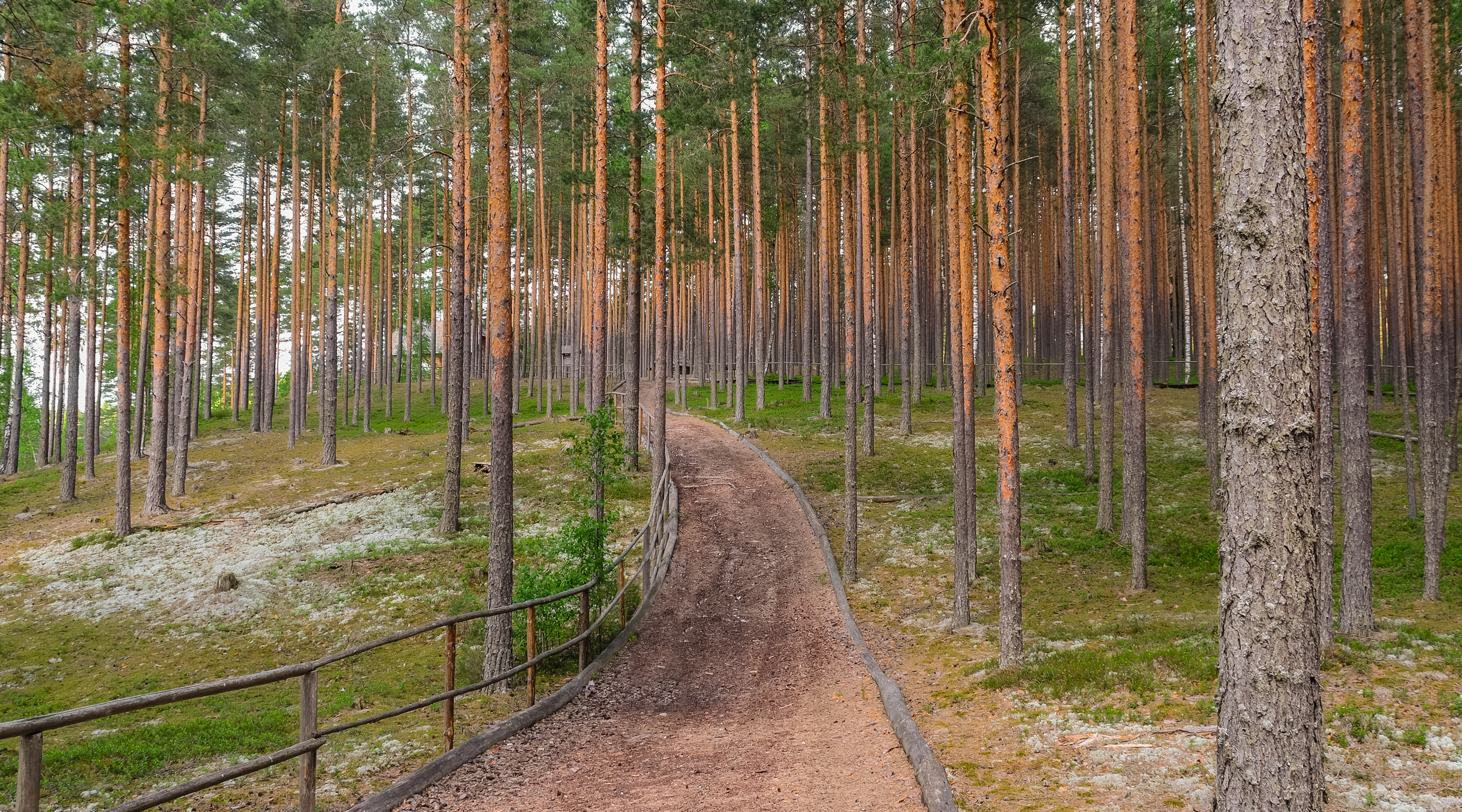
Scots pine forest in Estonia

Pinus sylvestris is an important tree in forestry. The wood is used for pulp and sawn timber products. A seedling stand can be created by planting, sowing, or natural regeneration. Commercial plantation rotations vary between 50 and 120 years, with longer rotations in northeastern areas where growth is slower.

In Scandinavian countries, the pine was used for making tar in the preindustrial age. Some active tar producers still exist, but that industry has almost ceased. The pine has also been used as a source of rosin and turpentine.

The wood is pale brown to red-brown, and used for general construction work. It has a dry density around 470 kg/m^{3} (varying with growth conditions), an open porosity of 60%, a fibre saturation point of 0.25 kg/kg, and a saturation moisture content of 1.60 kg/kg. The pine fibres are used to make the textile known as vegetable flannel, which has a hemp-like appearance, but with a tighter, softer texture.

The pine has also been widely planted in New Zealand and much of the colder regions of North America; it was one of the first trees introduced to North America, in about 1600. It is listed as an invasive species in some areas there, including Ontario, Michigan. It has been widely used in the United States for the Christmas tree trade, and was one of the most popular Christmas trees from the 1950s through the 1980s. It remains popular for that usage, though it has been eclipsed in popularity, by such species as Fraser fir, Douglas-fir, and others. Despite its invasiveness in parts of eastern North America, the pine does not often grow well there, partly due to climate and soil differences between its native habitat and that of North America, and partly due to damage by pests and diseases; the tree often grows in a twisted, haphazard manner if not tended to (as they are in the Christmas tree trade). The pines may be killed by the pine wood nematode, which causes pine wilt disease. The nematode most often attacks trees that are at least ten years old and often kills trees it infects within a few weeks.

Previously, the pine was grown in and used extensively by the coal mining regions of Flanders, Belgium. It was used to fortify tunnels, primarily because it would make a cracking sound when in need of replacement. Large patches of forest, mostly containing the species, are still scattered over the countryside.

=== Cultivars ===
Several cultivars are grown for ornamental purposes in parks and large gardens, of which 'Aurea', 'Beuvronensis', 'Frensham', and 'Gold Coin' have gained the Royal Horticultural Society's Award of Garden Merit.

== In culture ==
The Scots pine is the plant badge of Clan Gregor and Clan Farquharson. It is the national tree of Scotland.

== Gallery ==
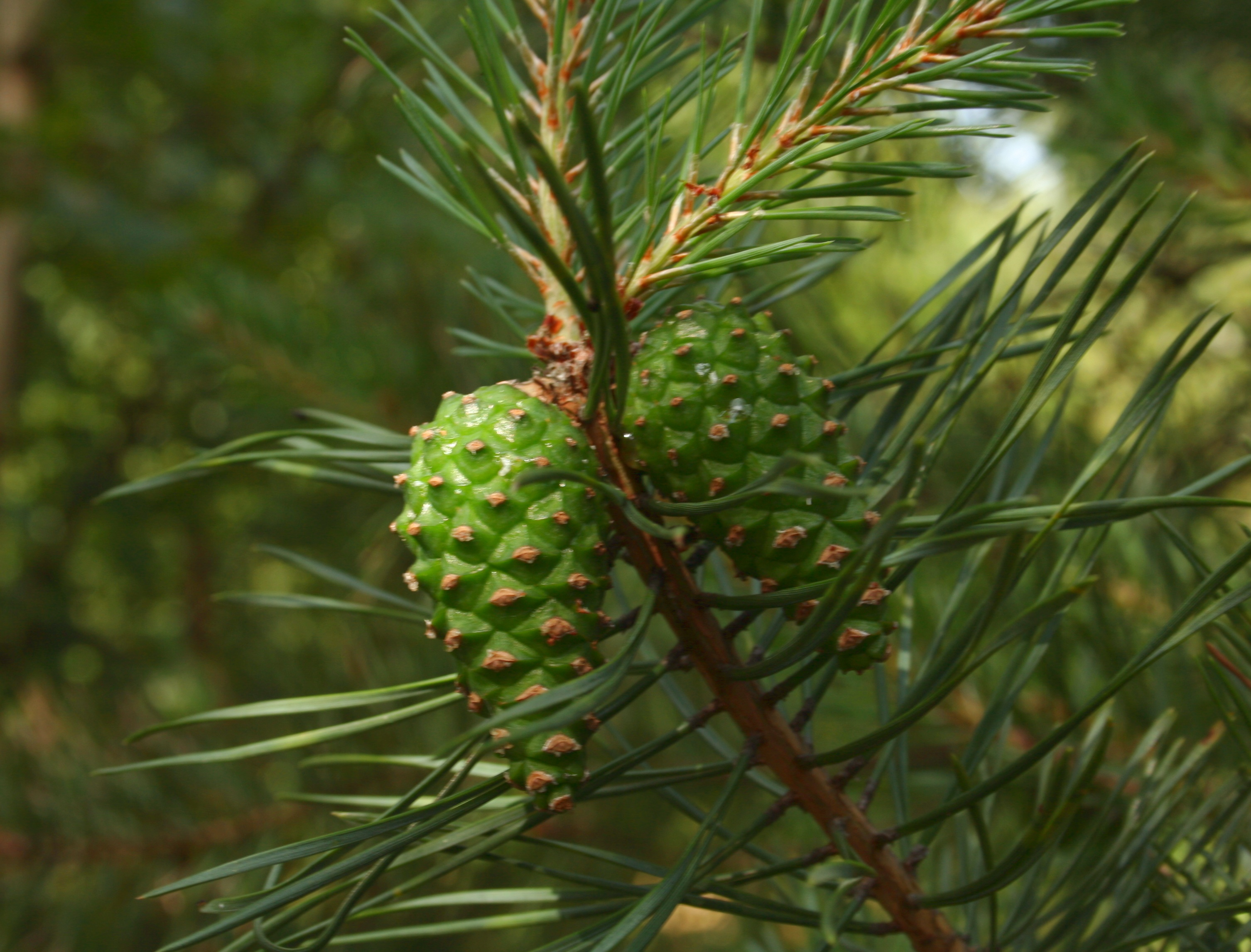
Leaves and cones, Poland

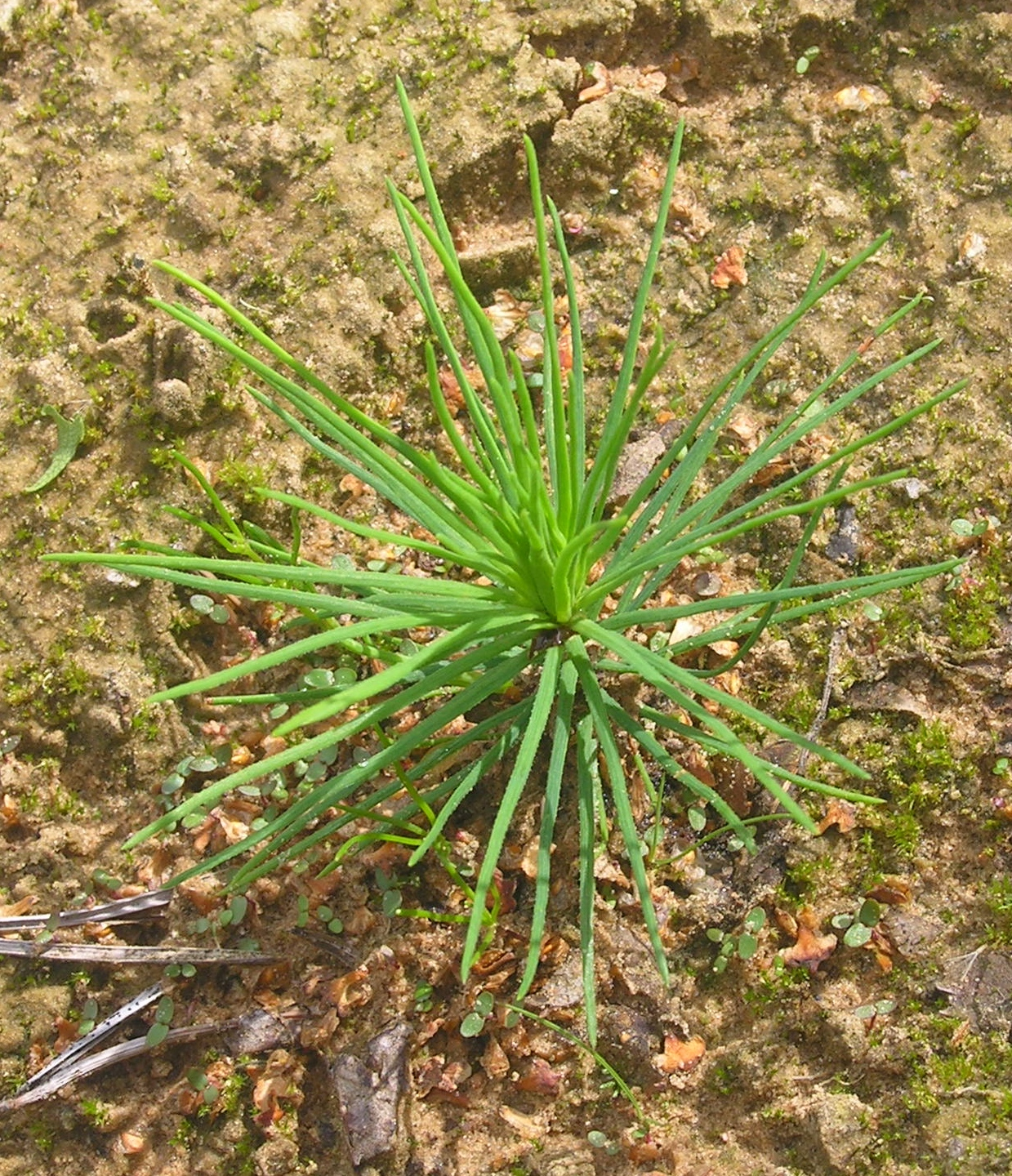
Seedling with flattish, unfascicled leaves

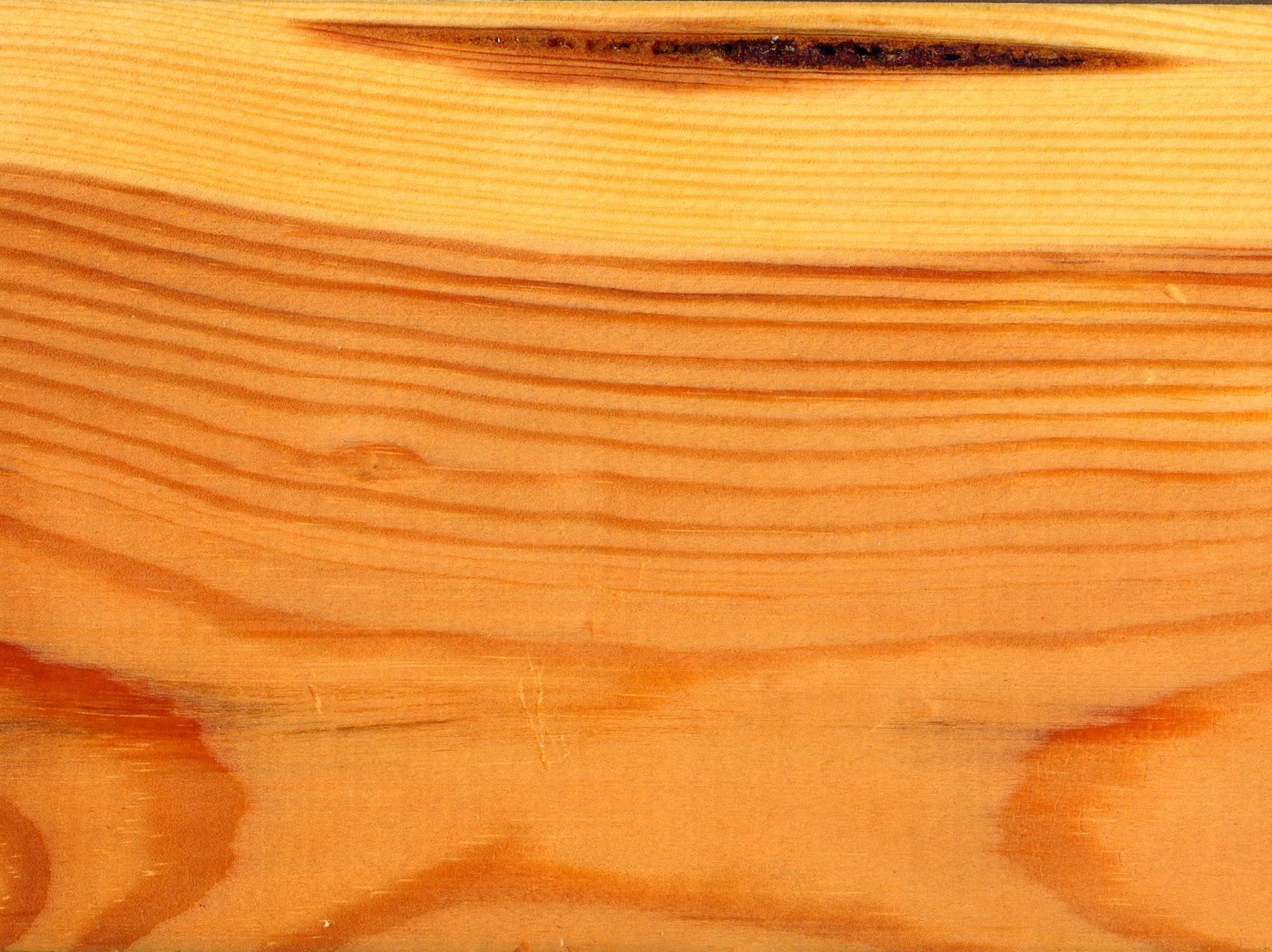
Wood

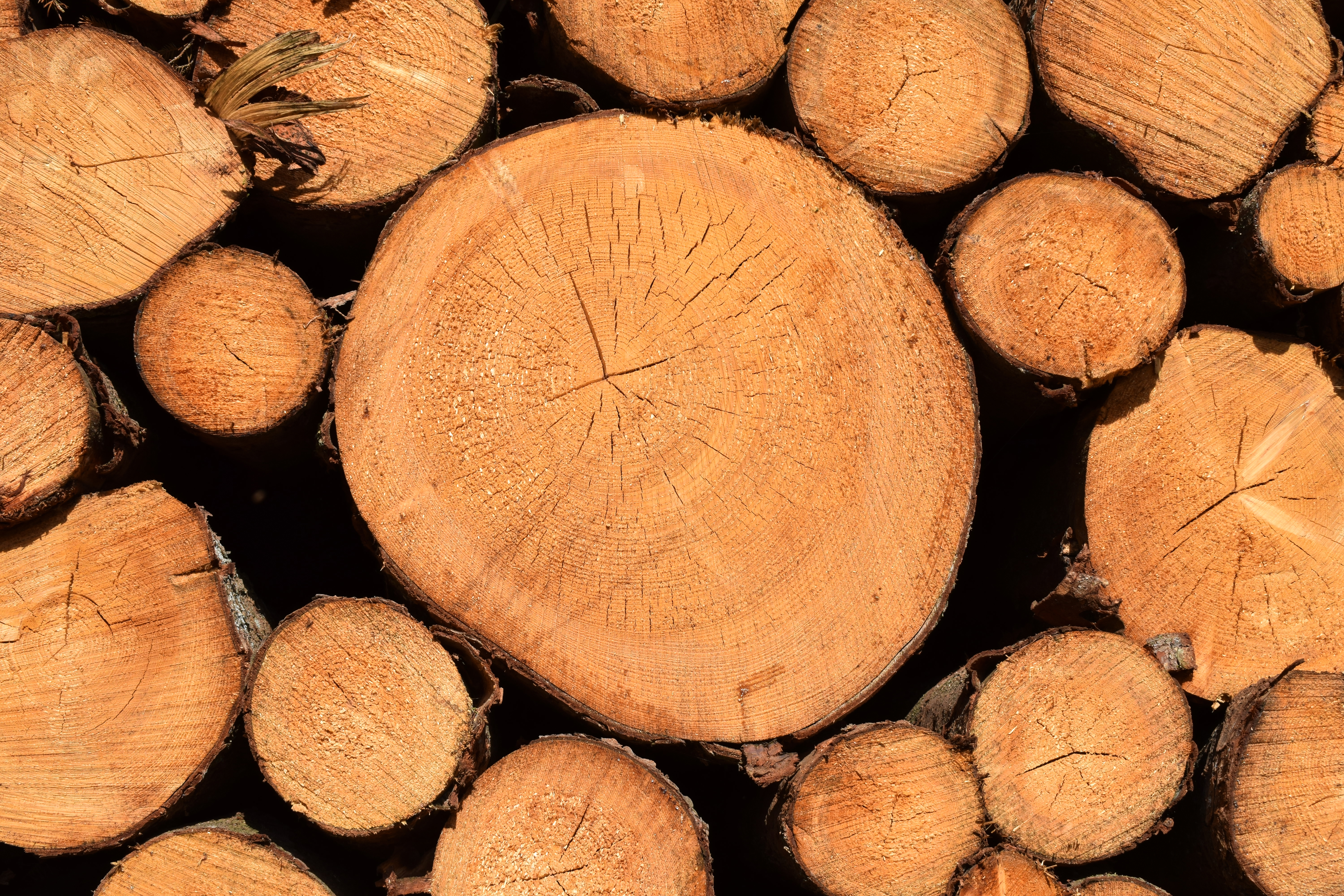
Cross-sections of pine logs from a thinning

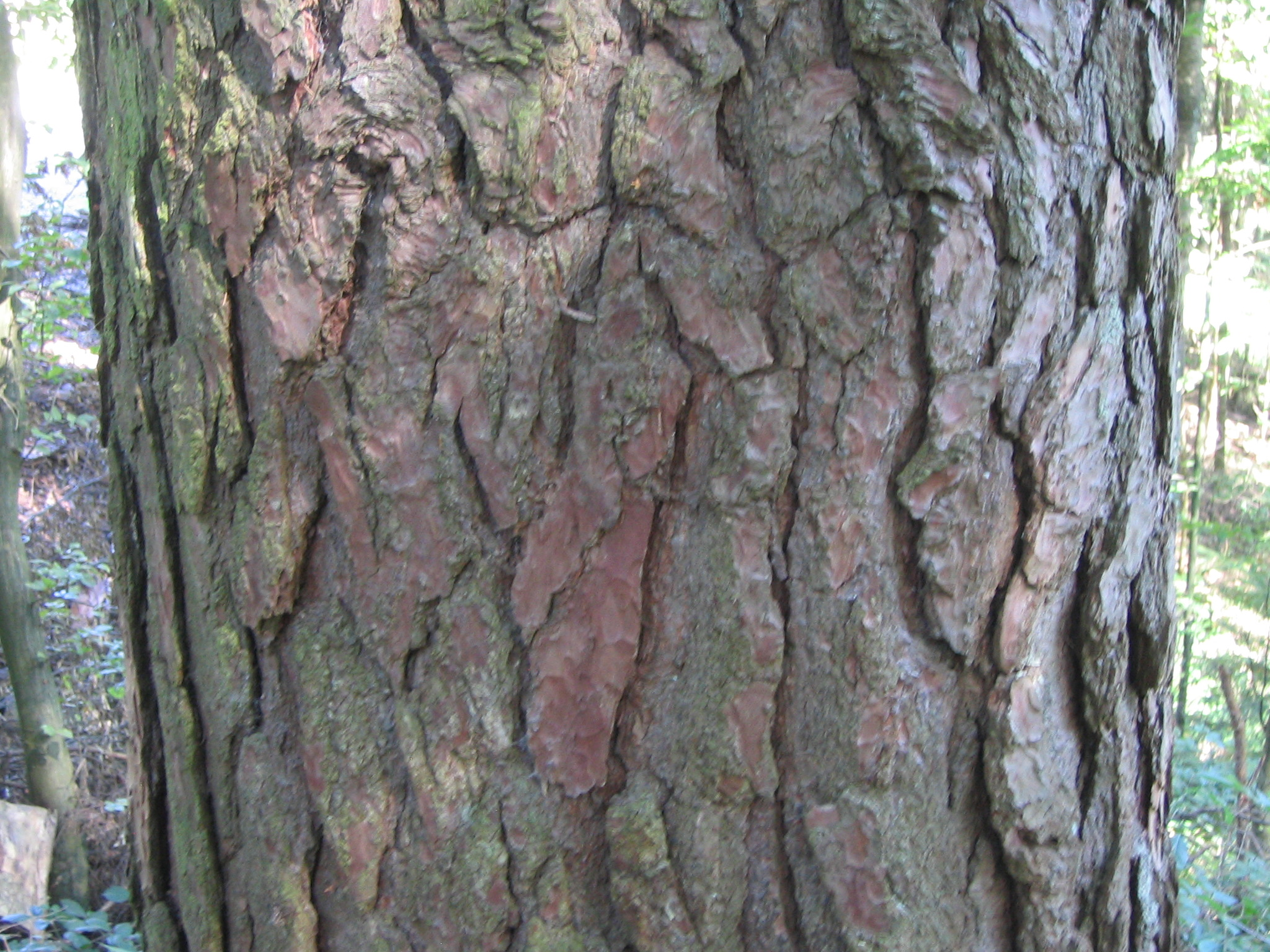
Bark on a mature specimen

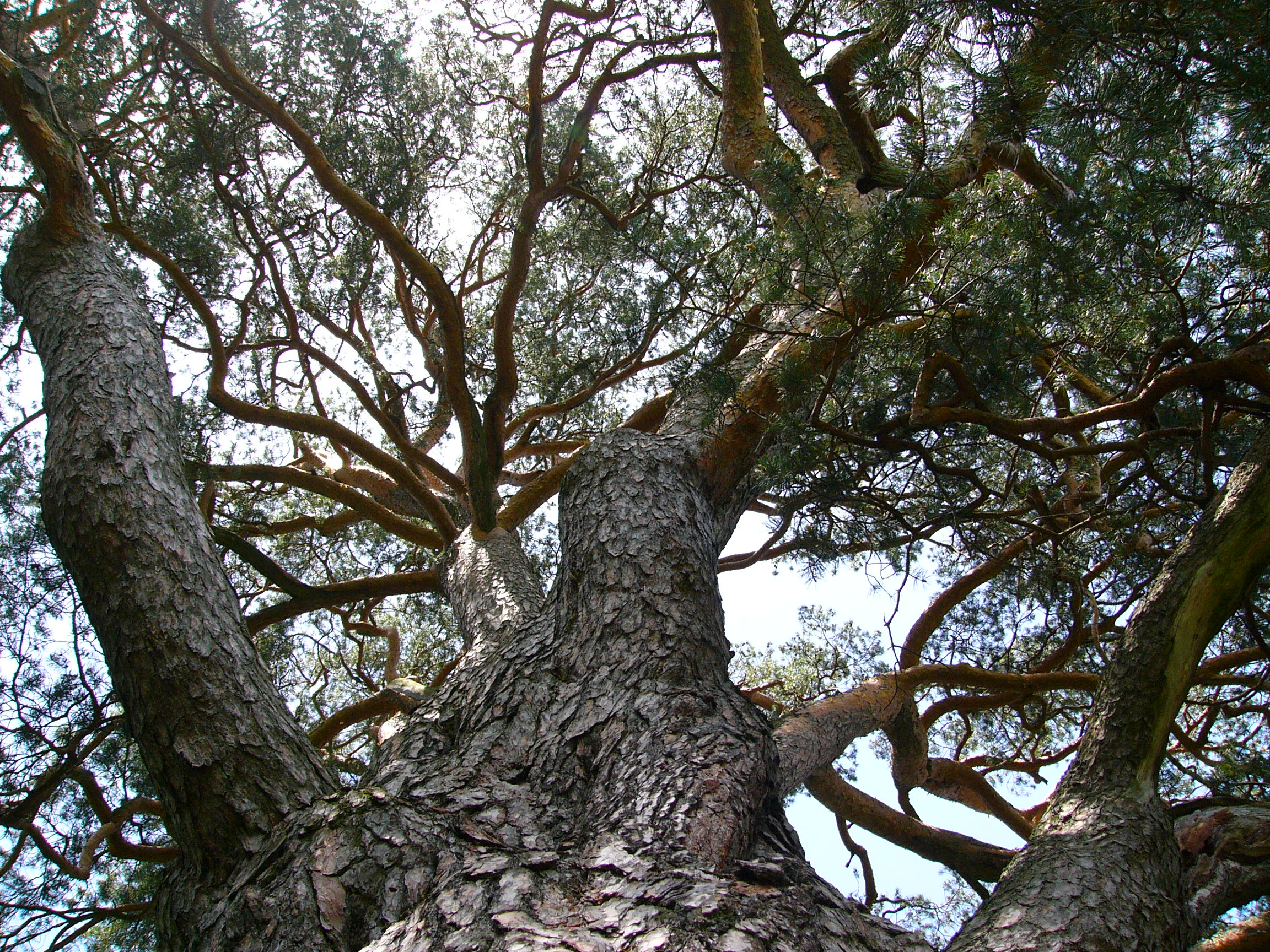
Looking up in the branch structure

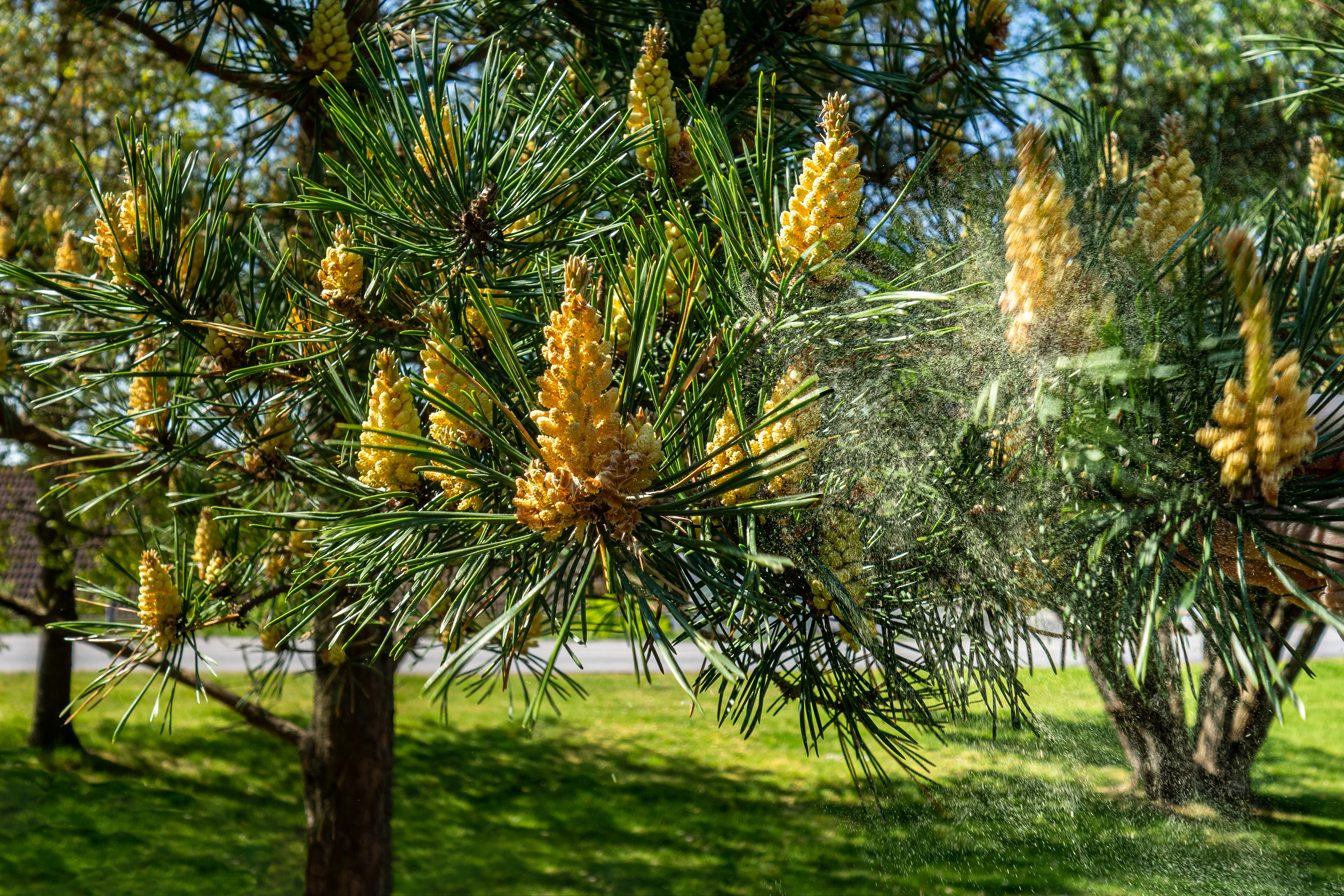
Pine releasing pollen on a windy day in Sweden

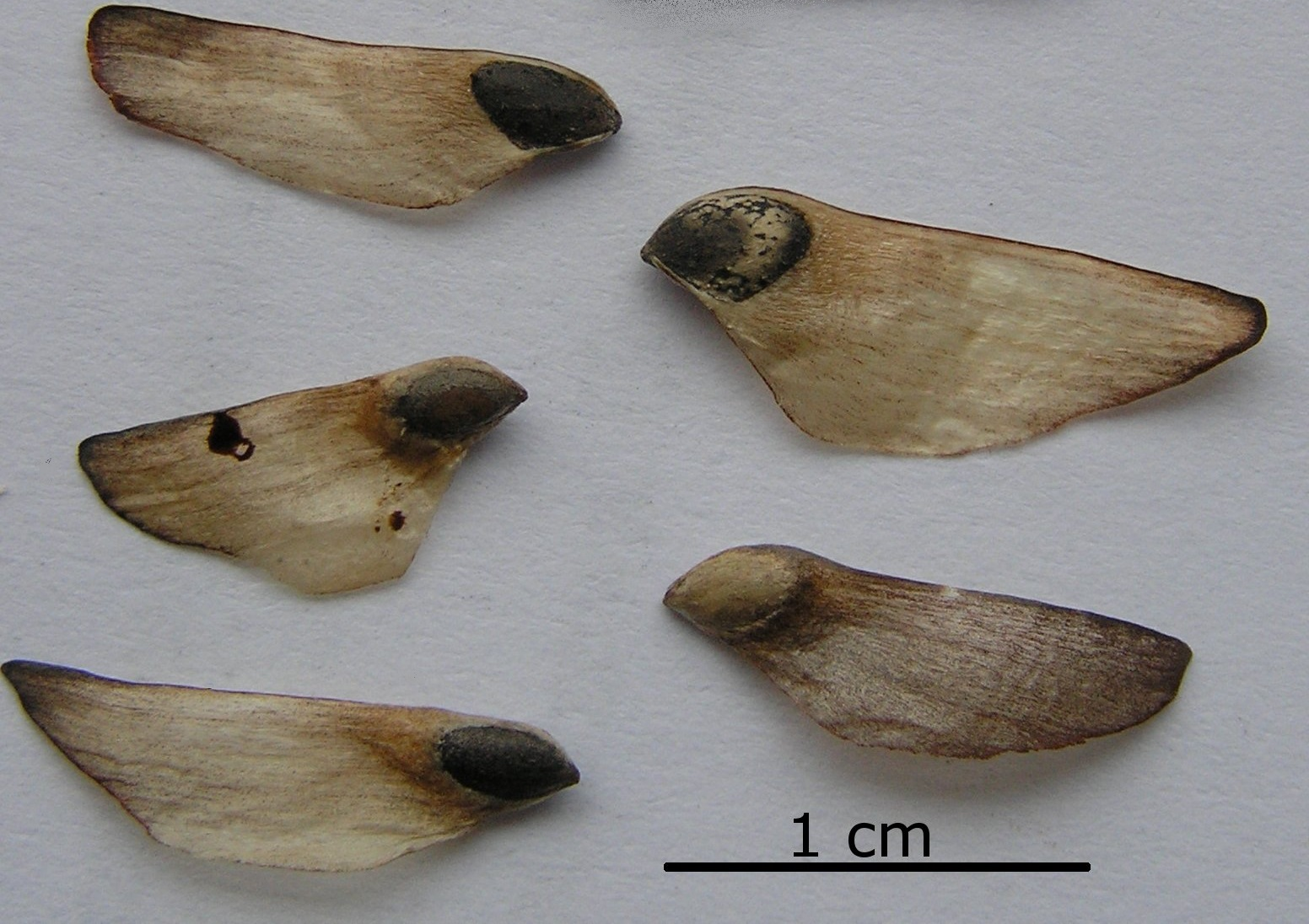
Seeds

== See also ==
- Pinus × rhaetica
