= Vegetable flannel =

Coarse woven fabric made from pine wool

Vegetable flannel is a type of flannel using fibres from the Scots pine, or Pinus sylvestris, rather than traditional woollen fibres. It is described as having a hemp like appearance, but with a tighter, softer texture. In addition to this, the term can also describe coarse linen used for underclothing.

== Manufacture ==
Invented in the early 19th century by L. Léopold Lairitz of Germany, the manufacture of vegetable flannel became a Black Forest industry due to the wide availability of the pines there which provided the raw materials. The raw fibre, called Waldwolle ("forest wool"), and the pine oil were separated, and then the Waldwolle was spun into yarn or thread, and either woven or knitted.

By 1900, vegetable flannel was mainly woven at Wrocław, which at the time was located in Germany.

== Properties ==
Vegetable flannel was promoted as a hypoallergenic option for those who could not wear wool, and was thought to be particularly good for rheumatism and neuralgia. In the nineteenth century, this was attributed to the tannins and resins present in the fibre, and "formic acid, which creates a gentle and constant excitement of the skin." Another contemporary article claimed that vegetable flannel regulated the release of phosphorus and other elements from the invalid's body. In 1900, vegetable flannel was widely used for blankets in German hospitals, prisons and barracks as it was thought not to harbour pests and vermin.

== Criticism ==
The German Polytechnisches Journal, which published several articles on Waldwolle as a promising new material, was later highly critical of marketing claims made for it. In an article in 1868 the journal stated that while the fibres extracted from pine needles were chemically identical to linen or cotton fibres, their mechanical properties – coarse, short and smooth – were such that spinning yarn from them was unlikely to be possible. The journal reported it had inspected samples of Waldwolle and found them to be mainly composed of cotton or wool and cotton blends with some pine fibre or pine oil added to provide a characteristic rough texture and pine scent.
