= Broomella =

Scientific classification
- Kingdom: Fungi
- Division: Ascomycota
- Class: Sordariomycetes
- Order: Amphisphaeriales
- Family: Sporocadaceae
- Genus: Broomella; Sacc.

Type species
- Broomella vitalbae (Berk. & Broome) Sacc.

Genus of fungi

Broomella is a genus of fungi in the family Sporocadaceae.

Fungal genera Broomella and Hyalotiella are poorly known genera in the formerly known Amphisphaeriaceae (now the Sporocadaceae family). Both types of genera are known from their morphological descriptions. Three collections of fungi were made from dead twigs of Clematis species in Italy, and two from Spartium species and were later identified using LSU gene data as Broomella and Hyalotiella species. Specifically Broomella vitalbae and Hyalotiella spartii.

== Species ==
As accepted by Species Fungorum;

- Broomella acuta Shoemaker & E. Müll. (1963)
- Broomella annulata Rehm ex Theiss. (1910)
- Broomella chlorina (Cooke) Sacc. (1883)
- Broomella excelsa Shoemaker & E. Müll. (1963)
- Broomella leptogiicola (Cooke & Massee) Sacc. (1891)
- Broomella montaniensis (Ellis & Everh.) E. Müll. & S. Ahmad (1955)
- Broomella phyllocharis Speg. (1891)
- Broomella pustulata I. Hino & Katum. (1955)
- Broomella ravenelii (Berk.) Sacc. (1883)
- Broomella rosae Wanas., Camporesi, E.B.G. Jones & K.D. Hyde (2018)
- Broomella tianshanica Z.Q. Yuan & Z.Y. Zhao (1992)
- Broomella verrucosa Shoemaker, C.E. Babc. & E. Müll. (1989)
- Broomella vitalbae (Berk. & Broome) Sacc. (1883)
- Broomella zeae Rehm (1915)

Former species;

- B. ichnaspidis Zimm. (1901) = Oomyces ichnaspidis, Acrospermaceae
- B. ichnaspidis var. major Zimm. (1901) = Oomyces ichnaspidis, Acrospermaceae
- B. lagerheimii Pat. (1895) = Allonecte lagerheimii, Tubeufiaceae
- B. miakei I. Hino & Katum. (1955) = Puttemansia miakei, Tubeufiaceae
- B. munkii Speg. (1885) = Uleodothis munkii, Venturiaceae
- B. rickiana Rehm (1906) = Phragmosperma rickianum, Massarinaceae
