= Heterotruncatella =

Scientific classification
- Kingdom: Fungi
- Division: Ascomycota
- Class: Sordariomycetes
- Order: Amphisphaeriales
- Family: Sporocadaceae
- Genus: Heterotruncatella; F. Liu, L. Cai & Crous (2018)

Genus of fungi

Heterotruncatella is a genus of plant pathogens in the family Sporocadaceae.

It was published by F. Liu, L. Cai & Crous in Studies in Mycology vol.92 on page 327 in 2018.

Heterotruncatella was introduced by Liu et al. (2019a), to accommodate several new and previously described Truncatella Steyaert species (also within the family Sporocadaceae). Although they are morphologically similar, phylogenetically they were distinct from Truncatella. Most species have been recorded from Australia and Europe (Senanayake et al. 2015, Liu et al. 2019a, Farr & Rossman 2019).

In 2020, black spot needle blight was found on hundreds of Pinus sylvestris var. mongolica trees in four forest farms in northeastern China. It first appeared on the upper part of the needles, and then the needles became withered and gradually showed light black spots, although they still remained green. As the fungal disease progressed, the needles eventually died and turned gray with many dark black spots. The fungus was identified as Heterotruncatella spartii based on morphology and molecular methods.

== Distribution ==
It has a scattered distribution, found in parts of South America, Europe, southern Africa, China, and Australia.

== Species ==
As accepted by Species Fungorum;

- Heterotruncatella acaciigena F. Liu, L. Cai & Crous (2018)
- Heterotruncatella aspera F. Liu, L. Cai & Crous (2018)
- Heterotruncatella avellanea F. Liu, L. Cai & Crous (2018)
- Heterotruncatella breviappendiculata F. Liu, L. Cai & Crous (2018)
- Heterotruncatella constricta F. Liu, L. Cai & Crous (2018)
- Heterotruncatella diversa F. Liu, L. Cai & Crous (2018)
- Heterotruncatella grevilleae F. Liu, L. Cai & Crous (2018)
- Heterotruncatella longissima F. Liu, L. Cai & Crous (2018)
- Heterotruncatella lutea (H.J. Swart & D.A. Griffiths) F. Liu, L. Cai & Crous (2018)
- Heterotruncatella proteicola F. Liu, L. Cai & Crous (2018)
- Heterotruncatella quercicola F. Liu, L. Cai & Crous (2018)
- Heterotruncatella restionacearum (S.J. Lee & Crous) F. Liu, L. Cai & Crous (2018)
- Heterotruncatella singularis F. Liu, L. Cai & Crous (2018)
- Heterotruncatella spadicea (S.J. Lee & Crous) F. Liu, L. Cai & Crous (2018)
- Heterotruncatella spartii (Senan., Camporesi & K.D. Hyde) F. Liu, L. Cai & Crous (2018)
- Heterotruncatella synapheae F. Liu, L. Cai & Crous (2018)
- Heterotruncatella vinaceobubalina F. Liu, L. Cai & Crous (2018)
