= Seimatosporium rhododendri =

Scientific classification
- Kingdom: Fungi
- Division: Ascomycota
- Class: Sordariomycetes
- Order: Amphisphaeriales
- Family: Sporocadaceae
- Genus: Seimatosporium
- Species: S. rhododendri

Binomial name
- Seimatosporium rhododendri (Schwein.) Piroz. & Shoemaker, (1970)

Species of fungus

Seimatosporium rhododendri is a plant pathogen.
