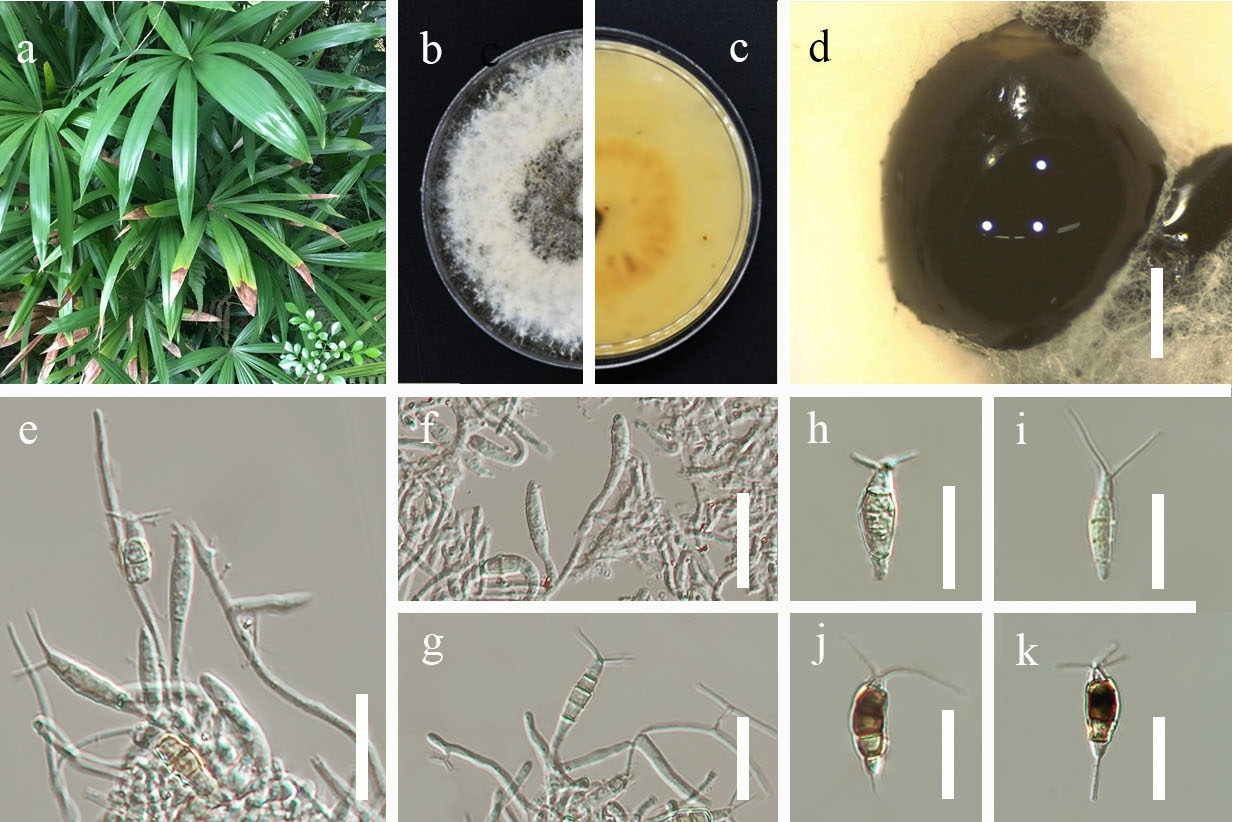
- Images of Neopestalotiopsis rhapidis

Scientific classification
- Kingdom: Fungi
- Division: Ascomycota
- Class: Sordariomycetes
- Order: Amphisphaeriales
- Family: Sporocadaceae; Corda, 1842

Type genus
- Sporocadus Corda, 1839

Genera
- See text

Synonyms
- Bartaliniaceae Wijayaw. Maharachch. & K.D. Hyde, Fungal Diversity 73: 85. 2015; Bartaliniaceae Wijayaw. Maharachch. & K.D. Hyde, Fungal Diversity 86: 5. 2017.; Discosiaceae Maharachch. & K.D. Hyde, Fungal Diversity 73: 94. 2015.; Pestalotiopsidaceae Maharachch. & K.D. Hyde, Fungal Diversity 73: 106. 2015.; Robillardaceae Crous, IMA Fungus 6: 184. 2015

= Sporocadaceae =

Family of fungi

The Sporocadaceae are a family of fungi, that was formerly in the order Xylariales. It was placed in the Amphisphaeriales order in 2020.

Species of Sporocadaceae are endophytic (living with a plant), plant pathogenic (causing disease) or saprobic (processing of decayed (dead or waste) organic matter). They are associated with a wide range of host plants. They are also endophytes or parasitic on humans and animals. Some of them are confirmed to cause human and animal diseases. For example, Pestalotiopsis spp. have been isolated from a bronchial biopsy, corneal abrasions, eyes, feet, fingernails, scalp, and sinuses from the human body.

Members of Sporocadaceae are also known as 'pestalotioid fungi', which refers to genera resembling those taxa having affinities with Pestalotia. A former genus, whose species are now split between Pestalotiopsis, Neopestalotiopsis and Pseudopestalotiopsis. 'Pestalotia' also encompasses genus Seiridium.

== History ==
The family Sporocadaceae was established by Corda in 1842 with the type genus of Sporocadus.

The order of Amphisphaeriales was resurrected by Senanayake et al. (2015), to include Amphisphaeriaceae, Clypeosphaeriaceae and another four novel families derived from Amphisphaeriaceae (Bartaliniaceae, Discosiaceae, Pestalotiopsidaceae and Phlogicylindriaceae). However, the fungal sequence dataset as used in Senanayake et al. (2015), was largely incomplete and some of the introduced families were not well supported statistically. Subsequently, Jaklitsch et al. (2016), synonymised Bartaliniaceae, Discosiaceae, Pestalotiopsidaceae and Robillardaceae, and then revived the older family name of Sporocadaceae to accommodate them (Crous et al. 2015).

Because genera in this family of fungi share the same evolutionary history, it is unlikely that the diversity of secondary metabolites detected in Pestalotiopsis is an exception within the family. Therefore, a large number of potential novel metabolites might be hidden and await discovery. The natural classification system proposed for Sporocadaceae in this study could thus present a major step to screen for novel metabolites in future studies.

== Description ==
Most fungal genera within the Sporocadaceae family have multi-septate (cavity walls) and more or less fusiform (spindle-like shaped) conidia with appendages at one or both ends, frequently with some melanised cells. This genus has undergone many rearrangements since it was first introduced by Italian botanist, lichenologist and mycologist De Notaris (1805–1877), in 1841.

The morphology of the asexual morph genera having acervular (an open, saucer-shaped asexual fruiting body) conidiomata that produce hyaline (resembling glass), pale or dark brown, septate conidia were taken into the consideration by various botanic authors when they were assigned to the family.

Pestalotia-like asexual morphs were classified in Amphisphaeriaceae (Samuels et al. 1987), accommodating 36 genera (Hawksworth et al. 1995).

== Hosts ==
They are associated with a wide range of host plants, including grapevines in China, Rosa spp. Camellia oleifera (Tea-oil tree) in China,

Many of the Sporocadaceae species were reported as important plant pathogenic fungi that mainly harm various economic crops, such as tea (Camellia sinensis), blueberry (Vaccinium corymbosum), and elephant apple, (Dillenia indica). Genera Pestalotiopsis and Neopestalotiopsis cause twig blight and dieback on blueberry plants in Portugal. Genera Neopestalotiopsis, Pestalotiopsis, and Seiridium are found on woody oil plants such as; (Camellia oleifera, Olea europaea (Olive), Paeonia suffruticosa, Sapium sebiferum, and Vernicia fordii) in Sichuan Province, China.

Species of Pestalotiopsis are found on Fagaceae leaves within China. Species Pestalotiopsis kenyana causes leaf spot disease on Zanthoxylum schinifolium (a species of prickly ash) in Sichuan Province, China.

Pestalotioid fungi are also one of the major agents causing leaf spots on mango trees in China.

In 2021, new species were found in Thailand, Neopestalotiopsis hydeana and Pestalotiopsis hydei which caused leaf spots and fruit rots on Alpinia malaccensis, Alpinia galangal, Annona squamosa, Artocarpus heterophyllus, Garcinia mangostana, Litsea petiolata, Vitis vinifera and various Citrus sp. in Chiang Rai, Thailand.

== Uses ==
In addition, members of Sporocadaceae are of particular interest with regard to the production of secondary metabolites, e.g. Pestalotiopsis, Bartalinia and Morinia (Collado et al., 2006, Gangadevi and Muthumary, 2008, Liu et al., 2009). Pestalotiopsis fici was shown to possess a very high number of gene clusters involved in bio-active compound synthesis (Wang et al. 2016).

== Distribution ==
It has a cosmopolitan distribution worldwide, except Canada, Alaska, Greenland and the North and South poles. Including Argentina, Thailand, Taiwan, and China.

== Genera ==
Studies on Sporocadaceae were mostly based on ITS and LSU sequence data (DNA analysis) and these data sets were not originally informative in resolving generic boundaries within the family (Jaklitsch et al. 2016b). The 2019 study by Liu et al. (2019a), provided a revision of this family complete with morphology and multi-gene phylogeny based on the LSU, ITS and rpb2 sequence data and further analysis using protein coding genes (tef1 or tub2) for each genus.

The family comprised 35 genera in 2022. It was estimated it had 750 species. As accepted in 2020 (with amount of genera);

- Allelochaeta Petr. (42)
- Annellolacinia B. Sutton (2)
- Bartalinia Tassi (19)
- Broomella Sacc. (2)
- Ciliochorella Syd. (4)
- Dilophospora Desm. (ca. 2 + few orphaned names)
- Diploceras (Sacc.) Died (2)
- Disaeta Bonar (1)
- Discosia Lib. (53)
- Distononappendiculata F. Liu, L. Cai & Crous (3)
- Diversimediispora F. Liu, L. Cai & Crous (1)
- Doliomyces Steyaert (3)
- Heterotruncatella F. Liu, L. Cai & Crous (17)
- Hyalotiella Papendorf (6)
- Hymenopleella Munk (inc. Dyrithiopsis L. Cai, Jeewon & K.D. Hyde; = Neotruncatella Hyang B.Lee & T.T.T. Nguyen) (8)
- Immersidiscosia Kaz. Tanaka, Okane & Hosoya (1)
- Millesimomyces Crous & M.J. Wingf. (1)
- Monochaetia (Sacc.) Allesch. (ca. 30)
- Morinia Berl. & Bres. (= Zetiasplozna Nag Raj) (2)
- Neopestalotiopsis Maharachch., K.D. Hyde & Crous (75)
- Nonappendiculata F. Liu, L. Cai & Crous (1)
- Nothoseiridium Crous (1)
- Parabartalinia F. Liu, L. Cai & Crous (1)
- Pestalotiopsis Steyaert (ca. 100)
- Pseudopestalotiopsis Maharachch., K.D. Hyde & Crous (22)
- Pseudosarcostroma F. Liu, L. Cai & Crous (1)
- Robillarda Sacc. (19)
- Sarcostroma Cooke (19)
- Seimatosporium Corda (ca.100)
- Seiridium Nees (20)
- Sporocadus Corda (16)
- Strickeria Körb. (10)
- Synnemapestaloides T. Handa & Y. Harada (2)
- Truncatella Steyaert (13)
- Vermisporium H.J. Swart & M.A. Will. (1)
- Xenoseimatosporium F. Liu, L. Cai & Crous (1)
