= Clypeosphaeriaceae =

Scientific classification
- Kingdom: Fungi
- Division: Ascomycota
- Class: Sordariomycetes
- Order: Xylariales
- Family: Clypeosphaeriaceae; G. Winter

Type genus
- Clypeosphaeria Fuckel

Family of fungi

The Clypeosphaeriaceae are a family of fungi in the order Xylariales.

== Genera ==
As accepted by GBIF;

- Amerostege Theissen, 1916
- Apioclypea K.D.Hyde, 1994 (6)
- Apiorhynchostoma Petr. (4)
- Aquasphaeria (1)
- Brunneiapiospora K.D.Hyde, J.Fröhlich & J.E.Taylor, 1998 (9)
- Clypeosphaeria Fuckel (40)
- Crassoascus Checa, Barrasa & A.T.Martínez (3)
- Curvatispora V.V.Sarma & K.D.Hyde, 2001 (1)
- Duradens G.J.Samuels & C.T.Rogerson, 1990 (1)
- Entosordaria (6)
- Palmomyces (1)
- Pseudovalsaria Spooner (4)
- Stereosphaeria Kirschst. (1)

Figures in brackets are approx. how many species per genus.
