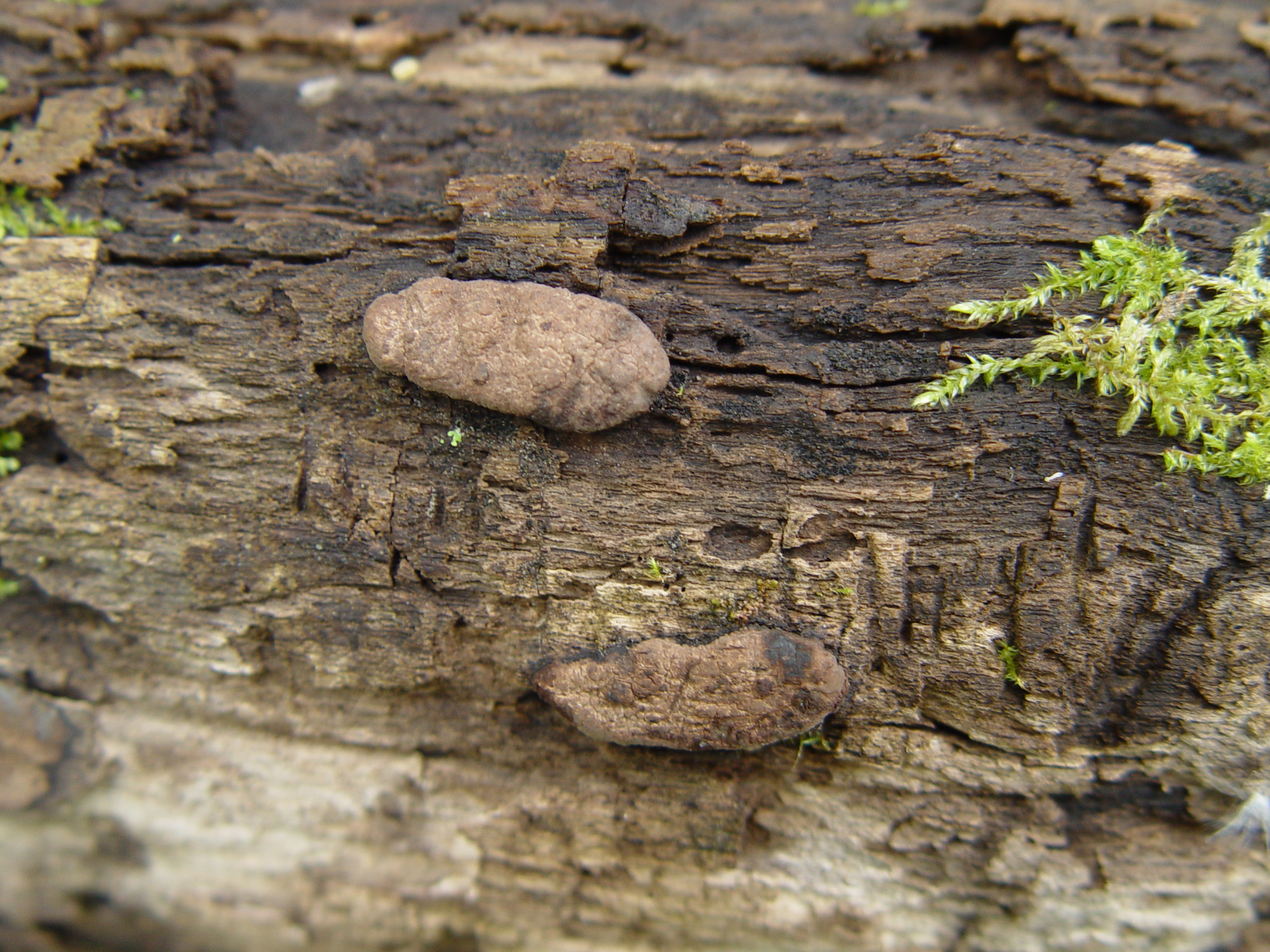

Scientific classification
- Kingdom: Fungi
- Division: Ascomycota
- Class: Sordariomycetes
- Order: Xylariales
- Family: Xylariaceae
- Genus: Nemania
- Species: N. serpens

Binomial name
- Nemania serpens (Pers.) Gray, (1821)

Synonyms
- Gamosphaera serpens (Pers.) Dumort. Geniculosporium serpens Chesters & Greenh., (1964); Hypoxylon serpens (Pers.) Fr., (1835); Nemania serpens (Pers.) Gray, (1821); Sphaeria mammiformis Hoffm. [as 'mammaeformis'], (1787); Sphaeria serpens Pers., (1796); Sphaeria undulata Schumach., (1803)

= Nemania serpens =

Species of fungus

Nemania serpens is a plant pathogen.
