= Fassin =

Fassin is a surname. Notable people with the surname include:

- Didier Fassin (born 1955), French sociologist and anthropologist
- Éric Fassin (born 1959), French sociologist
- Nicolas Henri Joseph de Fassin (1728–1811), Flemish painter

== See also ==
- Fassia
- Fassina
