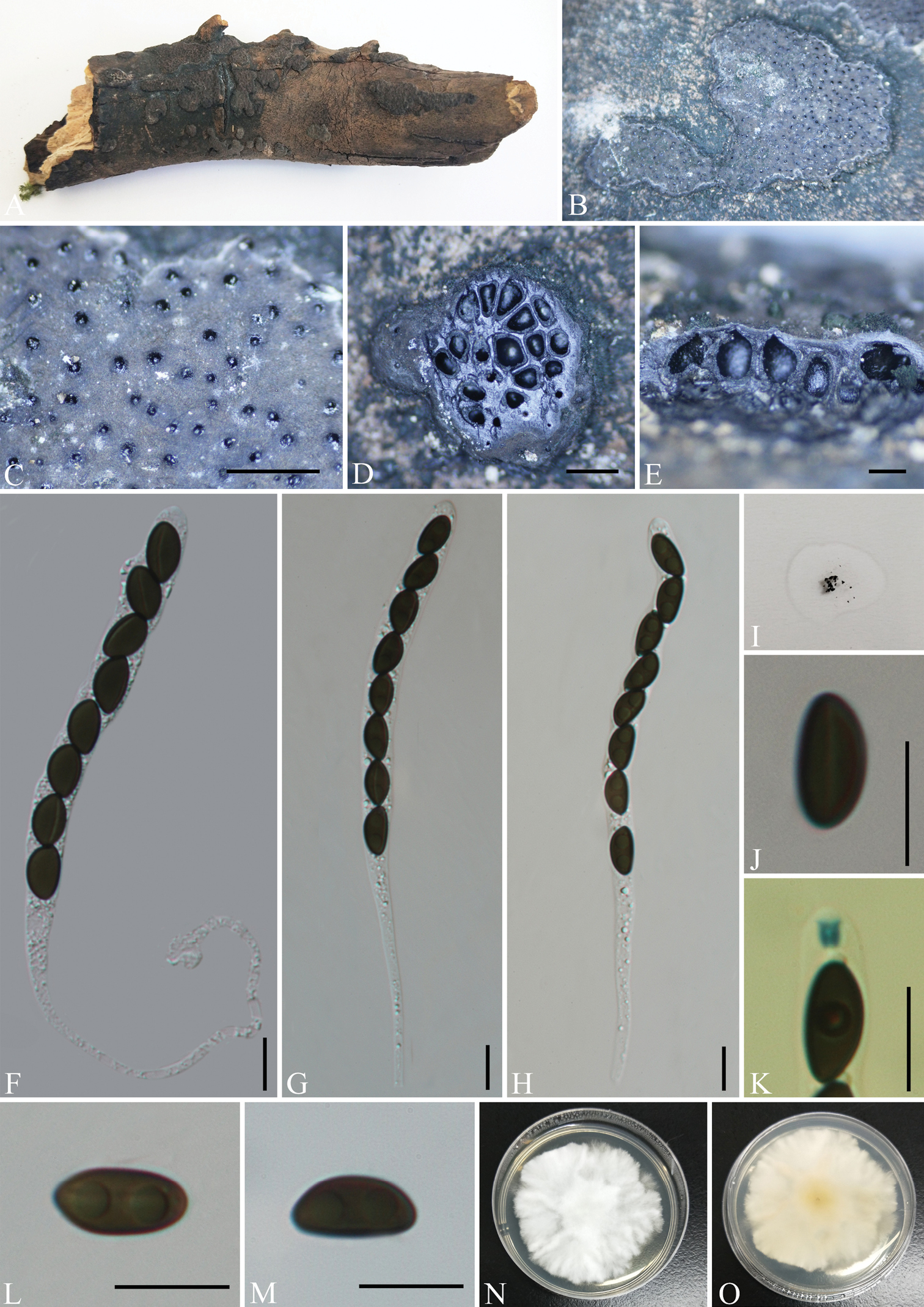
- N. diffusa A specimen B, C stromata on the surface of host D transverse sections of stromata E longitudinal sections of stromata F–H asci with ascospores I pigments in 10% KOH J ascospore with indehiscent perispore in 10% KOH K ascus apical apparatus (stained in Melzer's reagent) L, M ascospores N, O colonies on PDA (N-upper, O-lower). Scale bars: 0.5 mm (C–E); 10 μm (F–H, J–M)

Scientific classification
- Domain: Eukaryota
- Kingdom: Fungi
- Division: Ascomycota
- Class: Sordariomycetes
- Order: Xylariales
- Family: Xylariaceae
- Genus: Nemania
- Species: N. diffusa

Binomial name
- Nemania diffusa (Sowerby) Gray, (1821)

Synonyms
- Hypoxylon cohaerens var. brasiliense Starbäck, (1901); Hypoxylon exaratum (Schwein.) Sacc., (1882); Hypoxylon lilacinofuscum Bres., (1892); Hypoxylon subluteum Ellis & Everh., (1892); Hypoxylon unitum (Fr.) Nitschke, (1867); Hypoxylon vestitum Petch, (1924); Sphaeria diffusa Sowerby, (1803); Sphaeria exarata Schwein., (1832); Sphaeria unita Fr., (1828); Ustulina linearis Rehm, (1892)

= Nemania diffusa =

Species of fungus

Nemania diffusa is a plant pathogen.
