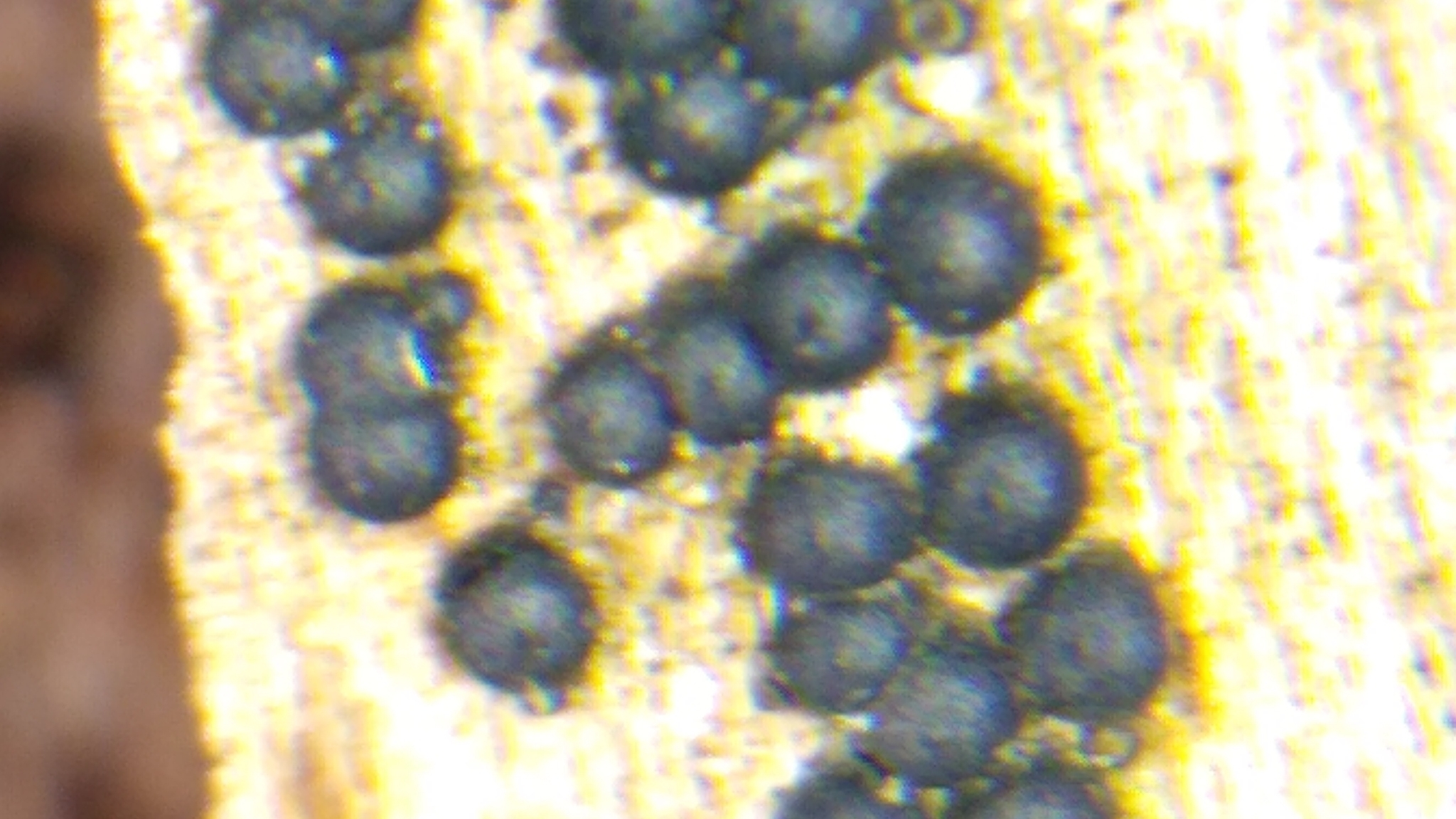

Scientific classification
- Domain: Eukaryota
- Kingdom: Fungi
- Division: Ascomycota
- Class: Sordariomycetes
- Order: Xylariales
- Family: Xylariaceae
- Genus: Rosellinia
- Species: R. subiculata

Binomial name
- Rosellinia subiculata (Schwein.) Sacc. (1882)

= Rosellinia subiculata =

Species of fungus

Rosellinia subiculata is a fungal plant pathogen infecting citruses. It is a uniperitheciate pyrenomycete in division Ascomycota. It can be distinguished by its scattered growth on decaying wood, its singular ostiole, and yellow subiculum.
