= Rosellinia pepo =

Scientific classification
- Domain: Eukaryota
- Kingdom: Fungi
- Division: Ascomycota
- Class: Sordariomycetes
- Order: Xylariales
- Family: Xylariaceae
- Genus: Rosellinia
- Species: R. pepo

Binomial name
- Rosellinia pepo Pat. (1908)

Species of fungus

Rosellinia pepo is a plant pathogen infecting the roots of the cacao tree distributed across Central America, West Indies and West Africa.
