= Nemania effusa =

Scientific classification
- Kingdom: Fungi
- Division: Ascomycota
- Class: Sordariomycetes
- Order: Xylariales
- Family: Xylariaceae
- Genus: Nemania
- Species: N. effusa

Binomial name
- Nemania effusa (Nitschke) Pouzar (1985)

Synonyms
- Hypoxylon effusum Nitschke (1867); Hypoxylon serpens var. effusum (Nitschke) J.H.Mill. (1961)

Species of fungus

Nemania effusa is a species of ascomycete fungus in the family Xylariaceae. It is often found living on the dead bark of willow trees. The species was originally named Hypoxylon effusum by German botanist Theodor Rudolph Joseph Nitschke in 1867; Zdeněk Pouzar transferred it to Nemania in 1985.
