= Rosellinia arcuata =

Scientific classification
- Kingdom: Fungi
- Division: Ascomycota
- Class: Sordariomycetes
- Order: Xylariales
- Family: Xylariaceae
- Genus: Rosellinia
- Species: R. arcuata

Binomial name
- Rosellinia arcuata Petch (1916)

Species of fungus

Rosellinia arcuata is a plant pathogen infecting tea.
