= Amphirosellinia =

Scientific classification
- Kingdom: Fungi
- Division: Ascomycota
- Class: Sordariomycetes
- Order: Xylariales
- Family: Xylariaceae
- Genus: Amphirosellinia; Y.-M.Ju, J.D.Rogers, H.-M.Hsieh & Lar.N.Vasiljeva (2004)

Type species
- Amphirosellinia nigrospora Y.M.Ju, J.D.Rogers & H.M.Hsieh (2004)

Species
- A. evansii A. fushanensis A. nigrospora A. quercina A. tennesseensis

Genus of fungi

Amphirosellinia is a genus of five species of fungi in the family Xylariaceae. It was circumscribed in 2004 with A. nigrospora as the type species. The genus name refers to the similarities in morphology it shares with the genus Rosellinia. Amphirosellinia species grow inside the bark of dicot trees, forming stromata (dense structural tissue) encased by black, carbonized perithecia. The ascospores are brown and ellipsoid to cylindrical in shape. The anamorph forms of Amphirosellinia have geniculate (zig-zag) conidiogenous regions.
