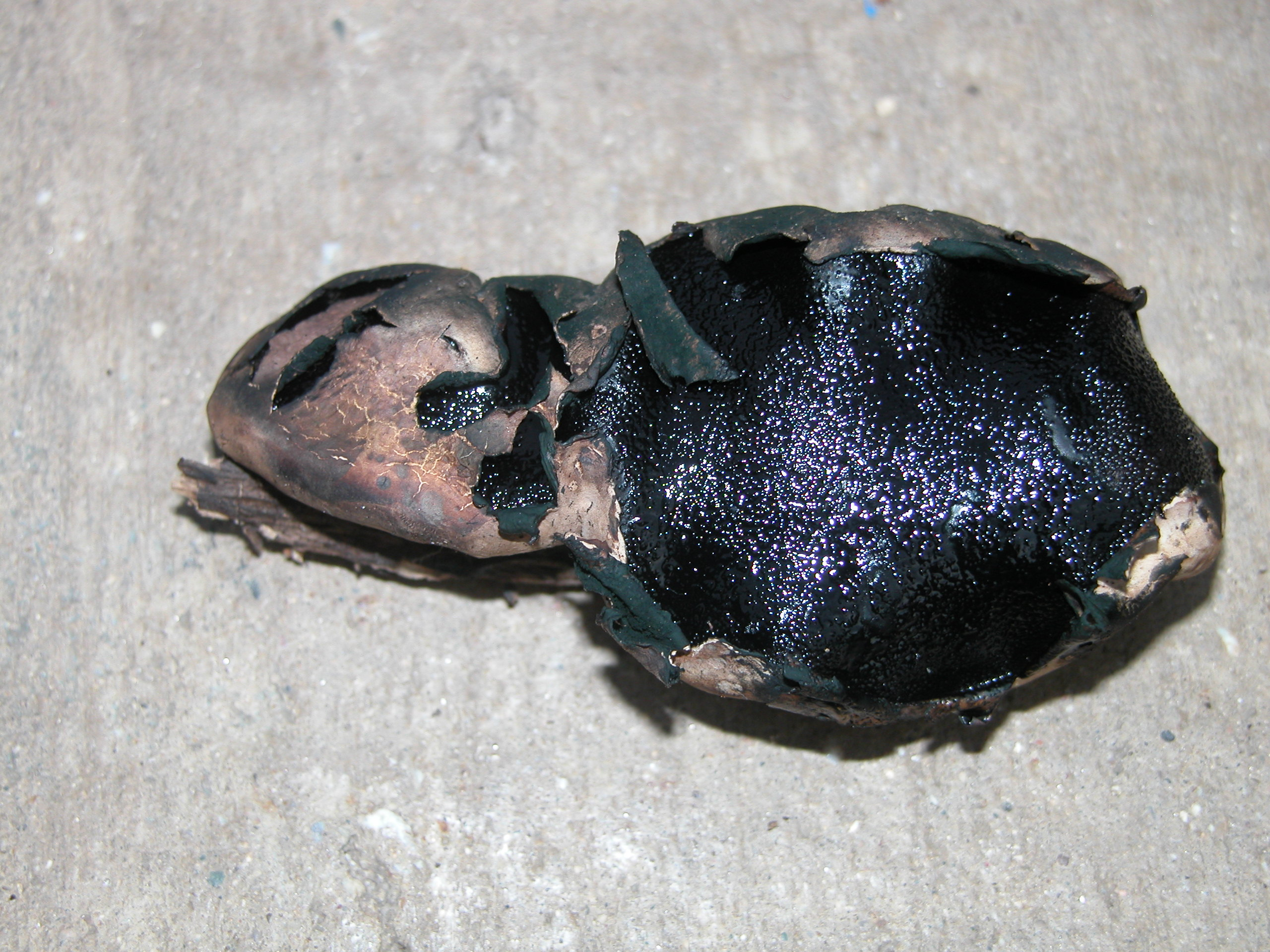
- Camarops petersii

Scientific classification
- Kingdom: Fungi
- Division: Ascomycota
- Class: Sordariomycetes
- Order: Boliniales
- Family: Boliniaceae
- Genus: Camarops; P.Karst. (1873)

Type species
- Camarops hypoxyloides P.Karst. (1873)

Species
- See text

Synonyms
- Hypoxylon sect. Bolinia Nitschke (1867); Bolinia (Nitschke) Sacc. (1882); Sarcostromella Boedijn (1959); Solenoplea Starbäck (1901); Biscogniauxia sect. Camarops (P.Karst.) Lar.N.Vassiljeva (1998)

= Camarops =

Genus of fungi

Camarops is a genus of fungi within the Boliniaceae family. The widespread genus contains 19 species.

== Species ==
- Camarops alborugosa
- Camarops amorpha
- Camarops antillana
- Camarops biporosa
- Camarops flava
- Camarops giganteum
- Camarops goossensiae
- Camarops hypoxyloides
- Camarops macrocenangium
- Camarops microspora
- Camarops nigricans
- Camarops ohiensis
- Camarops peltata
- Camarops petersii
- Camarops plana
- Camarops podocarpi
- Camarops polysperma
- Camarops pugillus
- Camarops quercicola
- Camarops rickii
- Camarops rogersii
- Camarops rostratus
- Camarops sacciformis
- Camarops scleroderma
- Camarops spathulata
- Camarops tubulina
- Camarops ustulinoides
