= Christian Gottfried Daniel Nees von Esenbeck =

German botanist and zoologist (1776–1858)

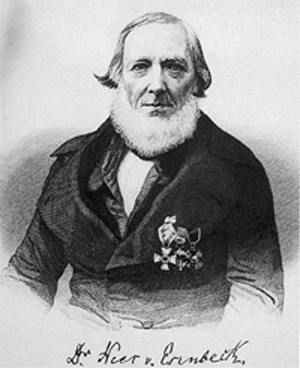
- Christian Gottfried Daniel Nees von Esenbeck in 1855
- Born: Christian Gottfried Daniel Nees von Esenbeck; 14 February 1776; Schloss Reichenberg, Reichelsheim (Odenwald), Hesse, Germany
- Died: 16 March 1858 (aged 82); Breslau
- Education: University of Jena
- Scientific career
- Fields: Botany, Zoology, Medicine
- Author abbrev. (botany): Nees

Christian Gottfried Daniel Nees von Esenbeck (14 February 1776 – 16 March 1858) was a prolific German botanist, physician, zoologist, and natural philosopher. He was a contemporary of Goethe and was born within the lifetime of Linnaeus. He described approximately 7,000 plant species (almost as many as Linnaeus himself). His last official act as president of the German Academy of Natural Scientists Leopoldina was to admit Charles Darwin as a member. He was the author of numerous monographs on botany and zoology and majority of his best-known works deal with fungi. The standard author abbreviation Nees is used to indicate this person as the author when citing a botanical name.

== Biography ==
Nees von Esenbeck was born in Schloss Reichenberg near Reichelsheim (Odenwald) in Hesse, Germany. He showed an early interest in science and, after receiving his primary education in Darmstadt, went on to the University of Jena and obtained his degree in biology (natural history) and medicine in 1800. He practiced as a physician for Francis I (Erbach-Erbach), but he had developed a great interest in botany during his university studies which caused him to return to academia. In 1816, he joined the Leopoldina Academy, which was one of the most prestigious institutions in Europe. In 1817, he was appointed professor of botany at the University of Erlangen. Three years later, he became professor of natural history at the University of Bonn, where he established the Botanische Gärten der Friedrich-Wilhelms-Universität Bonn. In 1831, he was appointed as a chair of botany department at the University of Breslau. In 1818, he was elected president of the Leopoldina Academy. He continued as president of the academy for the rest of his life. In botany he achieved notoriety for his contributions to the families Acanthaceae and Lauraceae.

He also became politically active in the German revolutions of 1848–1849. In 1851, due to conflicts with the government, he was deprived of his professorship and pension at Breslau. Seven years later, Nees von Esenbeck died essentially penniless in Breslau. He was an older brother to botanist Theodor Friedrich Ludwig Nees von Esenbeck (1787–1837).

== Eponyms ==
- Wilhelm Kirschstein published Myconeesia in 1936, a genus of fungi in the family Xylariaceae.
- Robert Knud Friedrich Pilger published Neesiochloa in 1940 as a genus of Brazilian plants in the grass family.
- Margaret Rutherford Bryan Levyns in 1947 published Neesenbeckia, a monotypic genus of flowering plants from South Africa, belonging to the family Cyperaceae.

== Works ==
- Die Algen des süßen Wassers, nach ihren Entwickelungsstufen dargestellt (1814)
- Das System der Pilze und Schwämme (1816)
- Vorlesungen zur Entwickelungsgeschichte des magnetischen Schlafs und Traums (1820)
- Handbuch der Botanik. Band 1 (1820) Digital edition by the University and State Library Düsseldorf
- Handbuch der Botanik. Band 2 (1821) Digital edition by the University and State Library Düsseldorf
- Bryologia germanica (with Christian Friedrich Hornschuch und Jacob Sturm, 1823–31, 2 Bände mit 43 Tafeln)
- Plantarum, in Horto medico Bonnensi nutritarum, Icones selectae (1824) Digital edition by the University and State Library Düsseldorf
- Agrostologia brasiliensis (1829)
- Genera Plantarum Florae Germanicae (1831–1860)
- Genera et species Asterearum (1833)
- Naturgeschichte der europäischen Lebermoose mit Erinnerungen aus dem Riesengebirge (1833-38, 4 Bände)
- Hymenopterorum Ichneumonibus affinium monographiae (1834, 2 Bände)
- System der spekulativen Philosophie, Band 1
- Systema Laurinarum (1836)
- Florae Africae australioris illustration monographicae Gramineae (1841)
- Die Naturphilosophie (1841)
- De Cinnamomo disputatio (1843)
- Synopsis hepaticarum (with Carl Moritz Gottsche und Johann Lindenberg, 1844–1847)
- Die allgemeine Formenlehre der Natur (1852)
