= Brunneiapiospora =

Scientific classification
- Kingdom: Fungi
- Division: Ascomycota
- Class: Sordariomycetes
- Order: Xylariales
- Family: Clypeosphaeriaceae
- Genus: Brunneiapiospora; K.D. Hyde, J. Fröhlich & J.E. Taylor

Type species
- Brunneiapiospora javensis K.D. Hyde, J. Fröhl. & Joanne E. Taylor

Genus of fungi

Brunneiapiospora is a genus of fungi in the family Clypeosphaeriaceae.
