= Ascovirgaria =

Scientific classification
- Kingdom: Fungi
- Division: Ascomycota
- Class: Sordariomycetes
- Order: Xylariales
- Family: Xylariaceae
- Genus: Ascovirgaria; J.D. Rogers & Y.-M. Ju

Type species
- Ascovirgaria occulta J.D. Rogers & Y.M. Ju

Genus of fungi

Ascovirgaria is a genus of fungi in the family Xylariaceae. This is a monotypic genus, containing the single species Ascovirgaria occulta.
