= Vivantia =

Scientific classification
- Kingdom: Fungi
- Division: Ascomycota
- Class: Sordariomycetes
- Order: Xylariales
- Family: Xylariaceae
- Genus: Vivantia; J.D. Rogers, Y.M. Ju & Candoussau

Type species
- Vivantia guadalupensis J.D. Rogers, Y.M. Ju & Candoussau

Fungus

Vivantia is a genus of fungi in the family Xylariaceae. A monotypic genus, it contains the single species V. guadalupensis, described in 1996.
