= Jumillera =

Scientific classification
- Kingdom: Fungi
- Division: Ascomycota
- Class: Sordariomycetes
- Order: Xylariales
- Family: Xylariaceae
- Genus: Jumillera; J.D. Rogers, Y.M. Ju & San Martín

Type species
- Jumillera mexicana J.D. Rogers, Y.M. Ju & F. San Martín

Genus of fungi

Jumillera is a genus of fungi in the family Xylariaceae.
