= Obolarina =

Scientific classification
- Kingdom: Fungi
- Division: Ascomycota
- Class: Sordariomycetes
- Order: Xylariales
- Family: Xylariaceae
- Genus: Obolarina; Pouzar

Type species
- Obolarina dryophila (Tul. & C. Tul.) Pouzar

Genus of fungi

Obolarina is a genus of fungi in the family Xylariaceae. This is a monotypic genus, containing the single species Obolarina dryophila.
