= Ascotricha =

Scientific classification
- Kingdom: Fungi
- Division: Ascomycota
- Class: Sordariomycetes
- Order: Xylariales
- Family: Xylariaceae
- Genus: Ascotricha; Berk.

Type species
- Ascotricha chartarum Berk.

Genus of fungi

Ascotricha is a genus of fungi in the family Xylariaceae; according to the 2007 Outline of Ascomycota, the placement in this family is uncertain.
