= Duradens =

Scientific classification
- Kingdom: Fungi
- Division: Ascomycota
- Class: Sordariomycetes
- Order: Xylariales
- Family: Clypeosphaeriaceae
- Genus: Duradens; Samuels & Rogerson
- Species: D. lignicola

Binomial name
- Duradens lignicola Samuels & Rogerson

Genus of fungi

Duradens is a genus of fungi in the family Clypeosphaeriaceae. This is a monotypic genus, containing the single species Duradens lignicola.
