= Collodiscula =

Scientific classification
- Kingdom: Fungi
- Division: Ascomycota
- Class: Sordariomycetes
- Order: Xylariales
- Family: Xylariaceae
- Genus: Collodiscula; I. Hino & Katum.

Type species
- Collodiscula japonica I. Hino & Katum.

Genus of fungi

Collodiscula is a genus of fungi in the family Xylariaceae. This is a monotypic genus, containing the single species Collodiscula japonica. Collodiscula japonica's anamorph is Acanthodochium collodisculae.
