= Rhopalostroma =

Scientific classification
- Kingdom: Fungi
- Division: Ascomycota
- Class: Sordariomycetes
- Order: Xylariales
- Family: Xylariaceae
- Genus: Rhopalostroma; D. Hawksw.

Type species
- Rhopalostroma indicum D. Hawksw. & Muthappa

Genus of fungi

Rhopalostroma is a genus of fungi in the family Xylariaceae.
