= Halorosellinia =

Scientific classification
- Kingdom: Fungi
- Division: Ascomycota
- Class: Sordariomycetes
- Order: Xylariales
- Family: Xylariaceae
- Genus: Halorosellinia; Whalley, E.B.G. Jones, K.D. Hyde & Læssøe

Type species
- Halorosellinia oceanica (S. Schatz) Whalley, E.B.G. Jones, K.D. Hyde & Læssøe

Genus of fungi

Halorosellinia is a genus of fungi in the family Xylariaceae. This is a monotypic genus, containing the single species Halorosellinia oceanica.
