= Appendixia =

Scientific classification
- Kingdom: Fungi
- Division: Ascomycota
- Class: Sordariomycetes
- Order: Xylariales
- Family: Xylariaceae
- Genus: Appendixia; B.S. Lu & K.D. Hyde

Type species
- Appendixia closterium

Genus of fungi

Appendixia is a genus of fungi in the family Xylariaceae. This is a monotypic genus, containing the single species Appendixia closterium.
