= Pyrenomyxa =

Scientific classification
- Kingdom: Fungi
- Division: Ascomycota
- Class: Sordariomycetes
- Order: Xylariales
- Family: Xylariaceae
- Genus: Pyrenomyxa; Morgan

Type species
- Pyrenomyxa invocans Morgan

Genus of fungi

Pyrenomyxa is a genus of fungi in the family Xylariaceae. The genus is synonymous with Pulveria Malloch & Rogerson.
