= Barrmaelia =

Scientific classification
- Kingdom: Fungi
- Division: Ascomycota
- Class: Sordariomycetes
- Order: Xylariales
- Family: Xylariaceae
- Genus: Barrmaelia; Rappaz

Type species
- Barrmaelia rhamnicola Rappaz

Genus of fungi

Barrmaelia is a genus of fungi in the family Xylariaceae. It was named after mycologist Margaret E. Barr.
