= Discoxylaria =

Scientific classification
- Kingdom: Fungi
- Division: Ascomycota
- Class: Sordariomycetes
- Order: Xylariales
- Family: Xylariaceae
- Genus: Discoxylaria; J.C. Lindq. & J.E. Wright

Type species
- Discoxylaria myrmecophila J.C. Lindq. & J.E. Wright

Genus of fungi

Discoxylaria is a genus of fungi in the family Xylariaceae. This is a monotypic genus, containing the single species Discoxylaria myrmecophila.
