= Calceomyces =

Scientific classification
- Domain: Eukaryota
- Kingdom: Fungi
- Division: Ascomycota
- Class: Sordariomycetes
- Order: Xylariales
- Family: Xylariaceae
- Genus: Calceomyces; Udagawa & S. Ueda
- Species: C. lacunosus

Binomial name
- Calceomyces lacunosus Udagawa & S. Ueda

Genus of fungi

Calceomyces is a genus of fungi in the family Xylariaceae. This is a monotypic genus, containing the single species Calceomyces lacunosus.
