= Helicogermslita =

Scientific classification
- Kingdom: Fungi
- Division: Ascomycota
- Class: Sordariomycetes
- Order: Xylariales
- Family: Xylariaceae
- Genus: Helicogermslita; Lodha & D. Hawksw.

Type species
- Helicogermslita celastri (S.B. Kale & S.V.S. Kale) Lodha & D. Hawksw.

Genus of fungi

Helicogermslita is a genus of fungi in the family Xylariaceae. Fossils have been found in rocks 12 million year old sediments from central England.
