= Euepixylon =

Scientific classification
- Kingdom: Fungi
- Division: Ascomycota
- Class: Sordariomycetes
- Order: Xylariales
- Family: Xylariaceae
- Genus: Euepixylon; Füisting

Type species
- Euepixylon udum (Pers.) Füisting

Genus of fungi

Euepixylon is a genus of fungi in the family Xylariaceae.
