= Aquasphaeria =

Scientific classification
- Kingdom: Fungi
- Division: Ascomycota
- Class: Sordariomycetes
- Order: Xylariales
- Family: Clypeosphaeriaceae
- Genus: Aquasphaeria; K.D. Hyde

Type species
- Aquasphaeria dimorphospora K.D. Hyde

Genus of fungi

Aquasphaeria is a genus of fungi in the family Clypeosphaeriaceae. This is a monotypic genus, containing the single species Aquasphaeria dimorphospora.
