= Camaropella =

Scientific classification
- Kingdom: Fungi
- Division: Ascomycota
- Class: Sordariomycetes
- Order: Boliniales
- Family: Boliniaceae
- Genus: Camaropella; Lar.N. Vassiljeva 1997

Species
- Camaropella lutea Camaropella pugillus

Genus of fungi

Camaropella is a genus of fungi within the Boliniaceae family.
