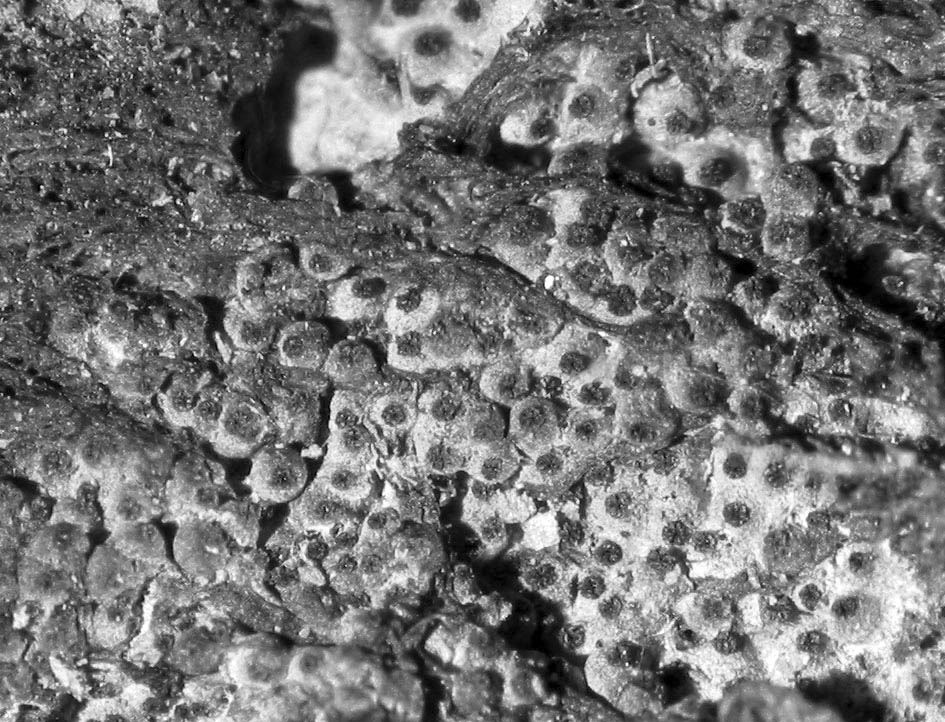
- Mollicampus stellata

Scientific classification
- Kingdom: Fungi
- Division: Ascomycota
- Class: Sordariomycetes
- Order: Boliniales
- Family: Boliniaceae
- Genus: Mollicamarops; Lar.N. Vassiljeva

Type species
- Mollicamarops stellata Lar.N. Vassiljeva

= Mollicamarops =

Genus of fungi

Mollicamarops is a genus of fungi within the Boliniaceae family. This is a monotypic genus, containing the single species Mollicamarops stellata.
