= Richard Eric Holttum =

English botanist and author (1895-1990)

Richard Eric Holttum (20 July 1895 – 18 September 1990) was an English botanist and writer.

== Early life ==
Holttum was born 20 July 1895 in Cambridgeshire, England, to English store owners of Quaker faith. He was educated at Bootham School, York. He studied at the University of Cambridge.

He served with the Friends' Ambulance Unit on the Western Front during World War I, for which he was awarded the Croix de guerre.

== Career ==
Having received botanical training, Holttum was given the role of assistant director at the Singapore Botanical Gardens in 1922, with the guidance of Isaac Henry Burkill. In Singapore, he performed some exhaustive studies, and was promoted to director in 1925, following the retirement of Burkill. His areas of expertise were the growth and cultivation of orchids. He continued working at the Singapore Botanical Gardens even during the Japanese occupation of the country.

Holttum and Corner (assistant director at the Singapore Botanical Garden) were once detained at the internment camp in Singapore. Dr. Kwan Koriba and Hidezo Tanaka, who took control of the Gardens, pleaded to keep Holttum and Corner at their posts at the Gardens. The Japanese Emperor Hirohito was an orchid enthusiast, so he granted the plea. This action led to the success of the hybridization of Singapore's national flower.

When the war finished, Holttum and Corner got approved to release Dr. Kwan Koriba from a prisoner camp. Dr. Kwan rejected the offer and chose to stay with his fellow soldiers. Holttum praised his act later.

Returning from Great Britain, where he departed to in 1925, Holttum continued his job as the Garden's director, until he moved to the University of Malaya in Singapore to serve as its first Professor of Botany. Holttum penned many books during his tenure at the educational institution, including Gardening at the lowlands of the Malays (which is credited as the first book on Singaporean gardening) and Plant Life in Malaya. He was also the first head of department for Botany at the Department of Biological Sciences at the National University of Singapore. He founded the Malayan Orchid Society (now Orchid Society of South East Asia) in 1928. He went back to England later in 1954.

Holttum's area of interest was pteridology, such as that of Malayan ferns.

In 1975 the British Pteridological Society dedicated an edition of The Fern Gazette to celebrate his Eightieth birthday, and the Biological Journal of the Linnean Society published eight short addresses about his life. The Flora Malesiana Bulletin published his autobiography, a bibliography of his publications, and a list of 27 plants dedicated to him.

There are at least 23 species of plant named after him, with epithets of holttumii or holttumianus. Also in 1924, Holttumia was published, which is a genus of fungi in the family Xylariaceae. Then published in 1964, Rehia which is a genus of plants in the grass family. Then in 1964, Holttumochloa which is a genus of Malaysian bamboos also in the Poaceae family and native to the hill forests of Peninsular Malaysia.

He received many awards, including the Gold Medal of the American Orchid Society (1963), the OSSEA Fellowship from the Orchid Society of South East Asia (1963), and the Linnean Medal from the Linnean Society (1964).

== Death ==
Spending some time at the Kew Gardens to work, Holttum died 18 September 1990 in Roehampton, London, aged 95.
