= Astrocystis =

Scientific classification
- Kingdom: Fungi
- Division: Ascomycota
- Class: Sordariomycetes
- Order: Xylariales
- Family: Xylariaceae
- Genus: Astrocystis; Berk. & Broome

Type species
- Astrocystis mirabilis Berk. & Broome

Genus of fungi

Astrocystis is a genus of fungi in the family Xylariaceae.
