= Emarcea =

Scientific classification
- Kingdom: Fungi
- Division: Ascomycota
- Class: Sordariomycetes
- Order: Xylariales
- Family: Xylariaceae
- Genus: Emarcea; Duong, R. Jeewon & K.D. Hyde

Type species
- Emarcea castanopsidicola Duong, Jeewon & K.D. Hyde

Genus of fungi

Emarcea is a genus of fungi in the family Xylariaceae; according to the 2007 Outline of Ascomycota, the placement in this family is uncertain. It is a monotypic genus, containing the single species Emarcea castanopsidicola.
