= Leprieuria =

Scientific classification
- Kingdom: Fungi
- Division: Ascomycota
- Class: Sordariomycetes
- Order: Xylariales
- Family: Xylariaceae
- Genus: Leprieuria; Laessøe, J.D. Rogers & Whalley

Type species
- Leprieuria bacillum (Mont.) Læssøe, J.D. Rogers & Whalley

Genus of fungi

Leprieuria is a genus of fungi in the family Xylariaceae. This is a monotypic genus, containing the single species Leprieuria bacillum.

The genus name of Leprieuria is in honour of François Mathias René Leprieur (1799–1870) who was a French pharmacist and naturalist.

The genus was circumscribed by Thomas Læssøe, Jack David Rogers and Anthony James Seddon Whalley in Mycol. Res. vol.93 (Issue 2) on page 152 in 1989.
