= Induratia =

Scientific classification
- Kingdom: Fungi
- Division: Ascomycota
- Class: Sordariomycetes
- Order: Xylariales
- Family: Xylariaceae
- Genus: Induratia; Samuels, E. Müll. & O. Petrini

Type species
- Induratia apiospora Samuels, E. Müll. & Petrini

Genus of fungi

Induratia is a genus of fungi in the family Xylariaceae. This is a monotypic genus, containing the single species Induratia apiospora.
