= Linostoma =

Linostoma may refer to:

- Linostoma (plant), a genus of plants in the family Thymelaeaceae
- Linostoma, a genus of beetles in the family Chrysomelidae, synonym of Platyphora
- Linostoma, a genus of protists in the family Condylostomatidae, synonym of Linostomella
- Linostoma, a genus of fungi in the family Ophiostomataceae, synonym of Ophiostoma
