= Fasciatispora =

Scientific classification
- Kingdom: Fungi
- Division: Ascomycota
- Class: Sordariomycetes
- Order: Xylariales
- Family: Xylariaceae
- Genus: Fasciatispora; K.D. Hyde

Type species
- Fasciatispora nypae K.D. Hyde

Genus of fungi

Fasciatispora is a genus of fungi in the family Xylariaceae.
