= Kretzschmariella =

Scientific classification
- Kingdom: Fungi
- Division: Ascomycota
- Class: Sordariomycetes
- Order: Xylariales
- Family: Xylariaceae
- Genus: Kretzschmariella; Viégas

Type species
- Kretzschmariella guaduae Viégas

Genus of fungi

Kretzschmariella is a genus of fungi in the family Xylariaceae. This is a monotypic genus, containing the single species Kretzschmariella guaduae.
