= Cornipulvina =

Scientific classification
- Kingdom: Fungi
- Division: Ascomycota
- Class: Sordariomycetes
- Order: Boliniales
- Family: Boliniaceae
- Genus: Cornipulvina; Huhndorf

Type species
- Cornipulvina ellipsoides Huhndorf, A.N. Mill., F.A. Fernández & Lodge

Genus of fungi

Cornipulvina is a genus of fungi within the Boliniaceae family. This is a monotypic genus, containing the single species Cornipulvina ellipsoides.
