= Spirodecospora =

Scientific classification
- Kingdom: Fungi
- Division: Ascomycota
- Class: Sordariomycetes
- Order: Xylariales
- Family: Xylariaceae
- Genus: Spirodecospora; B.S. Lu, K.D. Hyde & W.H. Ho

Type species
- Spirodecospora bambusicola B.S. Lu, K.D. Hyde & W.H. Ho

Genus of fungi

Spirodecospora is a genus of fungi in the family Xylariaceae.
