= Crassoascus =

Scientific classification
- Kingdom: Fungi
- Division: Ascomycota
- Class: Sordariomycetes
- Order: Xylariales
- Family: Clypeosphaeriaceae
- Genus: Crassoascus; Checa, Barrasa & A.T. Martínez

Type species
- Crassoascus fusisporus Checa, Barrasa & A.T. Martínez

Genus of fungi

Crassoascus is a genus of fungi in the family Clypeosphaeriaceae.
