= Clypeosphaeria =

Scientific classification
- Kingdom: Fungi
- Division: Ascomycota
- Class: Sordariomycetes
- Order: Xylariales
- Family: Clypeosphaeriaceae
- Genus: Clypeosphaeria; Fuckel

Type species
- Clypeosphaeria notarisii Fuckel

Genus of fungi

Clypeosphaeria is a genus of fungi in the family Clypeosphaeriaceae.
