= Palmomyces =

Scientific classification
- Kingdom: Fungi
- Division: Ascomycota
- Class: Sordariomycetes
- Order: Xylariales
- Family: Clypeosphaeriaceae
- Genus: Palmomyces; K.D. Hyde, J. Fröhlich & J.E. Taylor

Type species
- Palmomyces montaneus K.D. Hyde, J. Fröhl. & Joanne E. Taylor

Genus of fungi

Palmomyces is a genus of fungi in the family Clypeosphaeriaceae.

The genus name of Palmomyces is according to the authors, 'in reference to the palm loving habit of this genus'.
