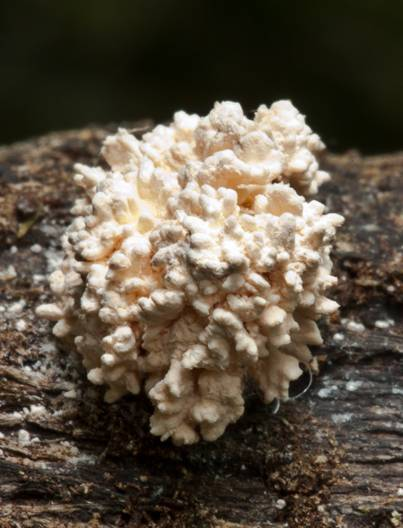

Scientific classification
- Domain: Eukaryota
- Kingdom: Fungi
- Division: Ascomycota
- Class: Sordariomycetes
- Order: Xylariales
- Family: Xylariaceae
- Genus: Xylocoremium; J.D.Rogers (1984)
- Species: X. flabelliforme

Binomial name
- Xylocoremium flabelliforme (Schwein.) J.D.Rogers (1984)

= Xylocoremium =

Genus of fungi

Xylocoremium is a fungal genus in the family Xylariaceae. The monotypic genus was circumscribed in 1984 to include the species Xylocoremium flabelliforme.
