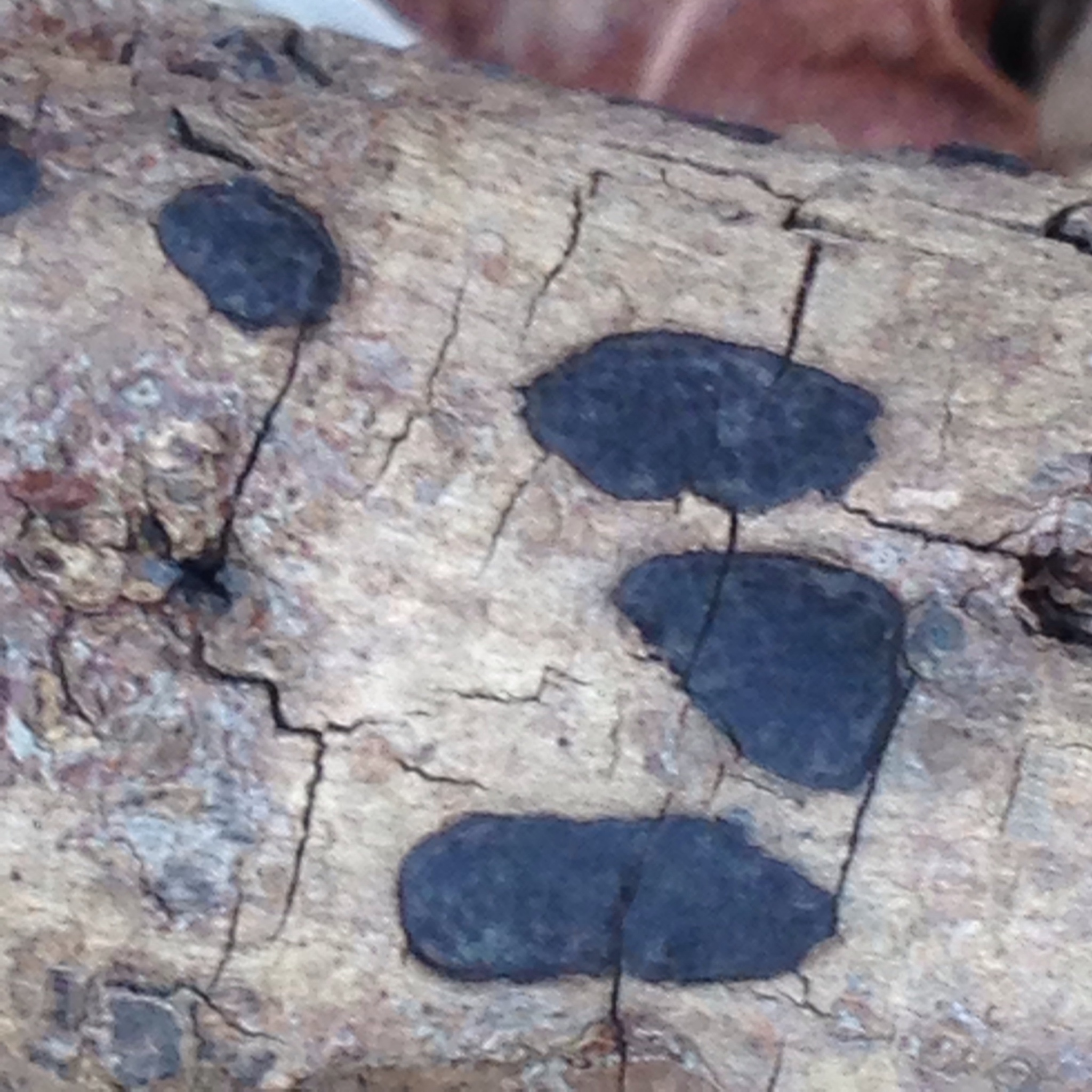
- Whalleya microplaca

Scientific classification
- Kingdom: Fungi
- Division: Ascomycota
- Class: Sordariomycetes
- Order: Xylariales
- Family: Xylariaceae
- Genus: Whalleya; J.D. Rogers, Y.M. Ju & San Martín

Type species
- Whalleya microplaca (Berk. & M.A. Curtis) J.D. Rogers

Species
- Whalleya maculata (Theiss.) J.D. Rogers (1997); Whalleya microplaca (Berk. & M.A. Curtis) J.D. Rogers (1997)

= Whalleya =

Genus of fungi

Whalleya is a genus of fungi in the family Xylariaceae.
