= Hypocopra =

Scientific classification
- Kingdom: Fungi
- Division: Ascomycota
- Class: Sordariomycetes
- Order: Xylariales
- Family: Xylariaceae
- Genus: Hypocopra (Fr.) J. Kickx f.

Type species
- Hypocopra merdaria (Fr.) J. Kickx f.

Genus of fungi

Hypocopra is a genus of fungi in the family Xylariaceae.
