= Apioclypea =

Scientific classification
- Kingdom: Fungi
- Division: Ascomycota
- Class: Sordariomycetes
- Order: Xylariales
- Family: Clypeosphaeriaceae
- Genus: Apioclypea; K.D. Hyde

Type species
- Apioclypea livistonae K.D. Hyde

Genus of fungi

Apioclypea is a genus of fungi in the family Clypeosphaeriaceae; according to the 2007 Outline of Ascomycota, the placement in this family is uncertain.
