= Lopadostoma =

Scientific classification
- Kingdom: Fungi
- Division: Ascomycota
- Class: Sordariomycetes
- Order: Xylariales
- Family: Xylariaceae
- Genus: Lopadostoma (Nitschke) Traverso

Type species
- Lopadostoma turgidum (Pers.) Traverso

Genus of fungi

Lopadostoma is a genus of fungi in the family Xylariaceae.
