= Holttumia =

Scientific classification
- Kingdom: Fungi
- Division: Ascomycota
- Class: Sordariomycetes
- Order: Xylariales
- Family: Xylariaceae
- Genus: Holttumia; Lloyd

Genus of fungi

Holttumia is a genus of fungi in the family Xylariaceae.

The genus name of Holttumia is in honour of Richard Eric Holttum (1895–1990), who was an English botanist and author.

The genus was circumscribed by Curtis Gates Lloyd in Mycol. Not. vol.7 on page 1285 in 1924.
