= Neohypodiscus =

Scientific classification
- Kingdom: Fungi
- Division: Ascomycota
- Class: Sordariomycetes
- Order: Boliniales
- Family: Boliniaceae
- Genus: Neohypodiscus; J.D. Rogers, Y.M. Yu & Laessœe

Type species
- Neohypodiscus rickii (Lloyd) J.D. Rogers, Y.M. Ju & Læssøe

Species
- N. cerebrinus N. irradians N. rickii

Genus of fungi

Neohypodiscus is a genus of fungi in the family Boliniaceae. The genus contains three widely distributed species.
