= Xylotumulus =

Scientific classification
- Kingdom: Fungi
- Division: Ascomycota
- Class: Sordariomycetes
- Order: Xylariales
- Family: Xylariaceae
- Genus: Xylotumulus; J.D. Rogers, Y.M. Ju & Hemmes

Genus of fungi

Xylotumulus is a genus of fungi in the family Xylariaceae.
