= Creosphaeria =

Scientific classification
- Kingdom: Fungi
- Division: Ascomycota
- Class: Sordariomycetes
- Order: Xylariales
- Family: Xylariaceae
- Genus: Creosphaeria; Theiss.

Type species
- Creosphaeria riograndensis Theiss.

Genus of fungi

Creosphaeria is a genus of fungi in the family Xylariaceae.
