= François Mathias René Leprieur =

French pharmacist and botanical collector (1799–1870)

François Mathias René Leprieur (18 April 1799, Saint-Dié-des-Vosges – 16 July 1870, Cayenne) was a French pharmacist and naturalist. Throughout his career, he collected specimens in the fields of entomology, ichthyology and botany.

Trained as a naval pharmacist, he was stationed in Senegambia from 1824 to 1829. With botanist George Samuel Perrottet, he conducted exploratory investigations of the region. During a furlough in France in 1829, he began a botanical work based on his observations and collections in Senegambia that was completed by Perrottet, Jean Baptiste Antoine Guillemin and Achille Richard and published as Florae Senegambiae tentamen.

From 1830 to 1849, he was based in Cayenne, Guyane, where he attained the post of pharmacist first-class. In the interior of the colony, he collected a large amount of natural history specimens. Here, he also took the opportunity to travel the Oyapock River to its source. From 1850 to 1858, he was assigned to the island of Martinique.

Several organisms with the specific epithet of leprieurii or leprieuri are named in his honour, including Leprieuria (which is a genus of fungi in the family Xylariaceae,) and the butterfly Asterope leprieuri, Leprieur's glory.

His younger brother was French army doctor and entomologist Charles Eugène Leprieur.
