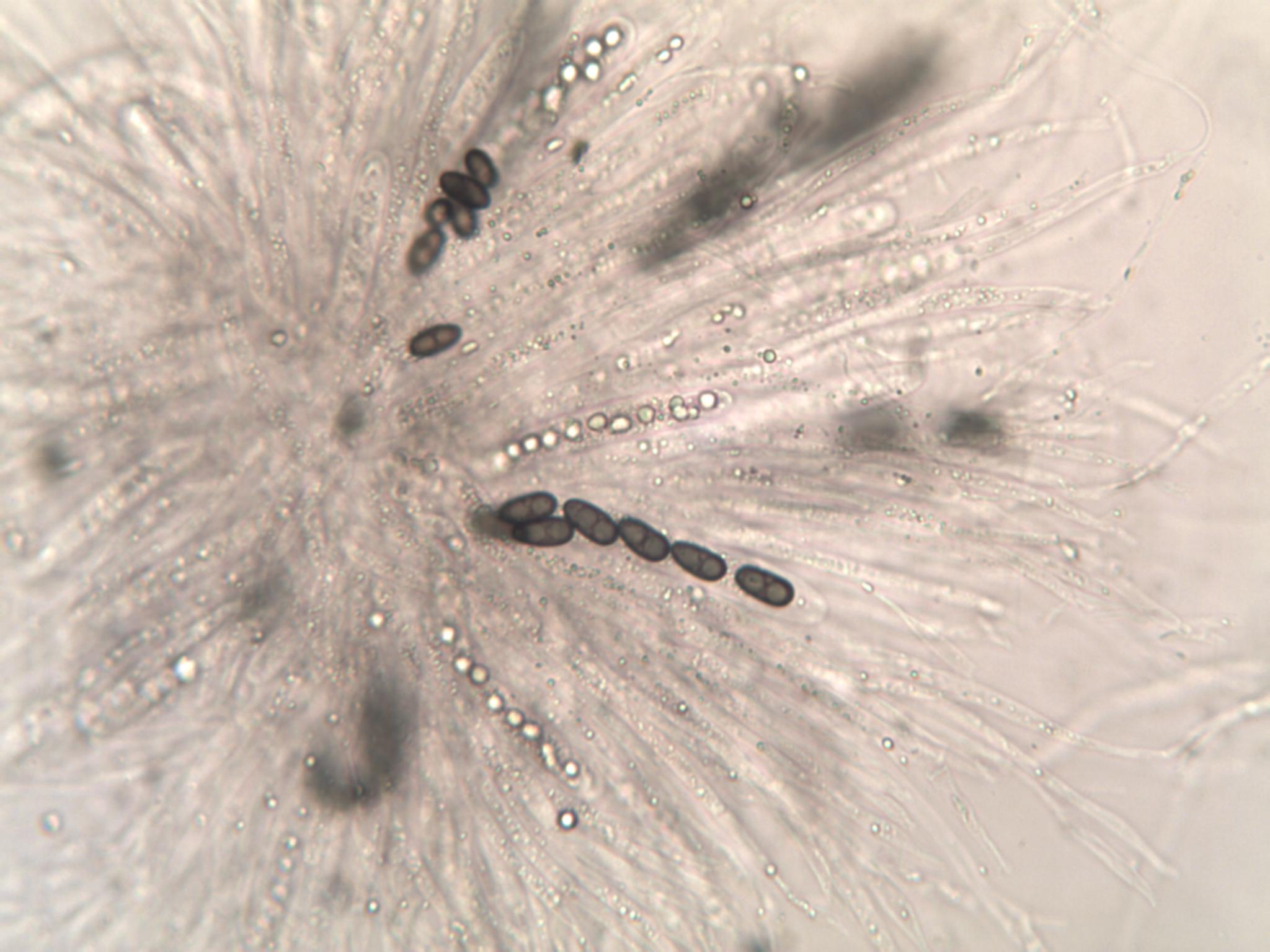
- Nemania Maritima

Scientific classification
- Domain: Eukaryota
- Kingdom: Fungi
- Division: Ascomycota
- Class: Sordariomycetes
- Order: Xylariales
- Family: Xylariaceae
- Genus: Nemania; Gray (1821)

Synonyms
- Gamosphaera Dumort. (1822)

= Nemania =

Genus of fungi

Nemania is a genus of fungi in the family Xylariaceae. The widespread genus contains 44 species. The anamorph form of Nemania species have historically been placed in the genus Geniculosporium.

== Species ==
- N. abortiva
- N. aenea
- N. albocincta
- N. angusta
- N. atropurpurea
- N. beaumontii
- N. bipapillata
- N. carbonacea
- N. caries
- N. chestersii
- N. chrysoconia
- N. circostoma
- N. confluens
- N. costaricensis
- N. creoleuca
- N. diffusa
- N. effusa
- N. flavitextura
- N. gwyneddii
- N. illita
- N. immersidiscus
- N. kauaiensis
- N. kellermanii
- N. latissima
- N. macrocarpa
- N. maculosa
- N. maritima
- N. memorabilis
- N. minutula
- N. nummularioides
- N. plumbea
- N. pouzarii
- N. primolutea
- N. pseudoillita
- N. quadrata
- N. ravenelii
- N. saladerana
- N. serpens
- N. sphaeriostoma
- N. subaenea
- N. venezuelen
