= Phylacia =

Scientific classification
- Kingdom: Fungi
- Division: Ascomycota
- Class: Sordariomycetes
- Order: Xylariales
- Family: Xylariaceae
- Genus: Phylacia; Lév.

Type species
- Phylacia globosa Lév.

Genus of fungi

Phylacia is a genus of fungi in the family Xylariaceae.
