= Linostomella =

Scientific classification
- Kingdom: Fungi
- Division: Ascomycota
- Class: Sordariomycetes
- Order: Boliniales
- Family: Boliniaceae
- Genus: Linostomella; Petr. 1925
- Species: L. sphaerosperma

Binomial name
- Linostomella sphaerosperma (Fuckel) Petr. 1925

Genus of fungi

Linostomella is a monotypic genus of fungi within the Boliniaceae family containing the sole species Linostomella sphaerosperma.
