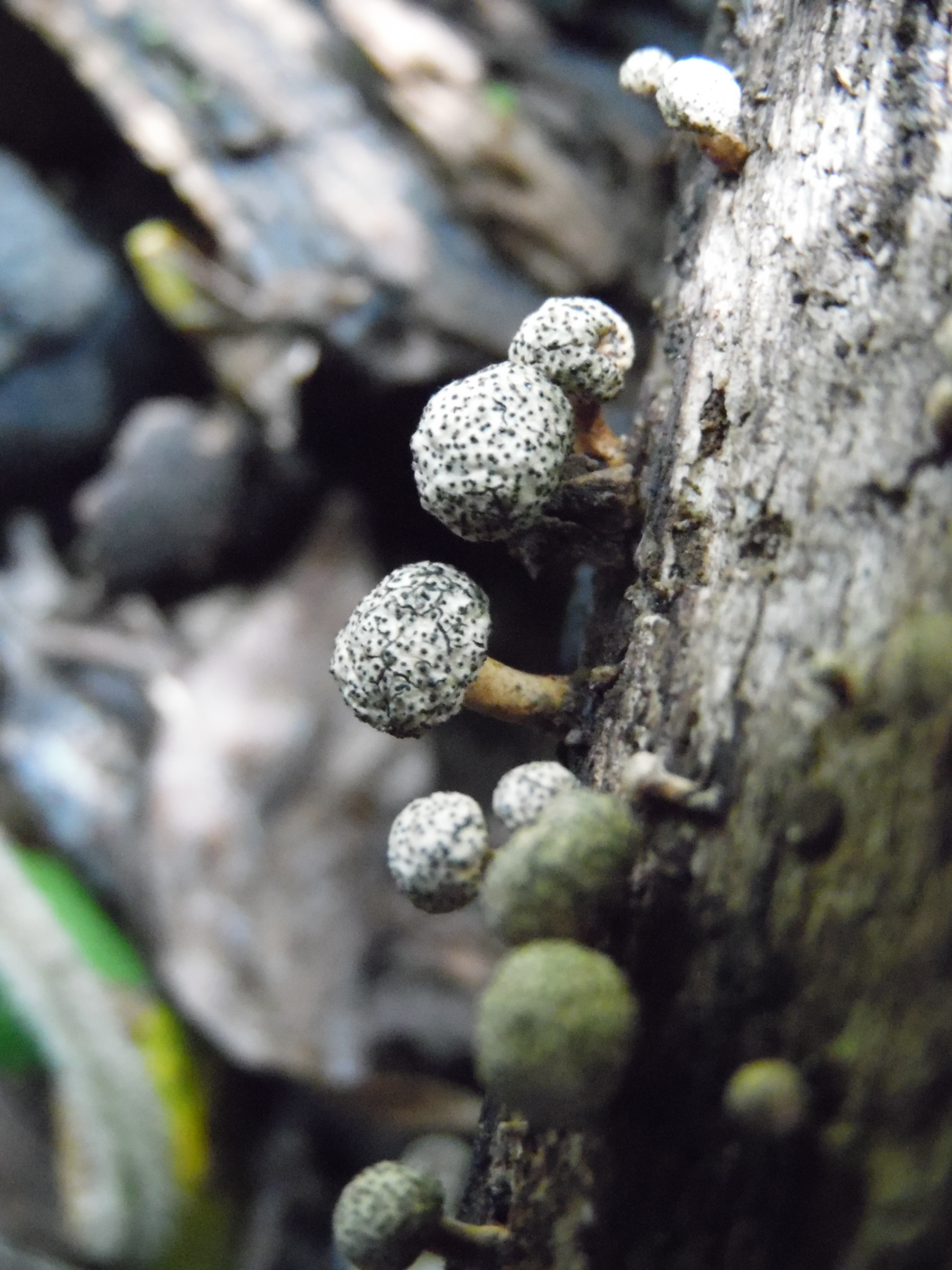

Scientific classification
- Kingdom: Fungi
- Division: Ascomycota
- Class: Sordariomycetes
- Order: Xylariales
- Family: Xylariaceae
- Genus: Podosordaria; Ellis & Holw.

Type species
- Podosordaria mexicana Ellis & Holw.

= Podosordaria =

Genus of fungi

Podosordaria is a genus of fungi in the family Xylariaceae.
