= Leptomassaria =

Scientific classification
- Kingdom: Fungi
- Division: Ascomycota
- Class: Sordariomycetes
- Order: Xylariales
- Family: Xylariaceae
- Genus: Leptomassaria; Petr.

Type species
- Leptomassaria simplex (G.H. Otth) Petr.

Genus of fungi

Leptomassaria is a genus of fungi in the family Xylariaceae; according to the 2007 Outline of Ascomycota, the placement in this family is uncertain.
