= Myconeesia =

Scientific classification
- Kingdom: Fungi
- Division: Ascomycota
- Class: Sordariomycetes
- Order: Xylariales
- Family: Xylariaceae
- Genus: Myconeesia; Kirschst.

Genus of fungi

Myconeesia is a genus of fungi in the family Xylariaceae.

The genus name of Myconeesia is in honour of Christian Gottfried Daniel Nees von Esenbeck (1776–1858), who was a prolific German botanist, physician, zoologist, and natural philosopher.

The genus was circumscribed by Wilhelm Kirschstein in Ann. Mycol. vol.34 on page 200 in 1936.
