= Wawelia =

Scientific classification
- Kingdom: Fungi
- Division: Ascomycota
- Class: Sordariomycetes
- Order: Xylariales
- Family: Xylariaceae
- Genus: Wawelia; Namysl.

Type species
- Wawelia regia Namysl.

Genus of fungi

Wawelia is a genus of fungi in the family Xylariaceae.
