= Stilbohypoxylon =

Scientific classification
- Kingdom: Fungi
- Division: Ascomycota
- Class: Sordariomycetes
- Order: Xylariales
- Family: Xylariaceae
- Genus: Stilbohypoxylon; P. Henn.

Type species
- Stilbohypoxylon moelleri Henn.

Genus of fungi

Stilbohypoxylon is a genus of fungi in the family Xylariaceae.
