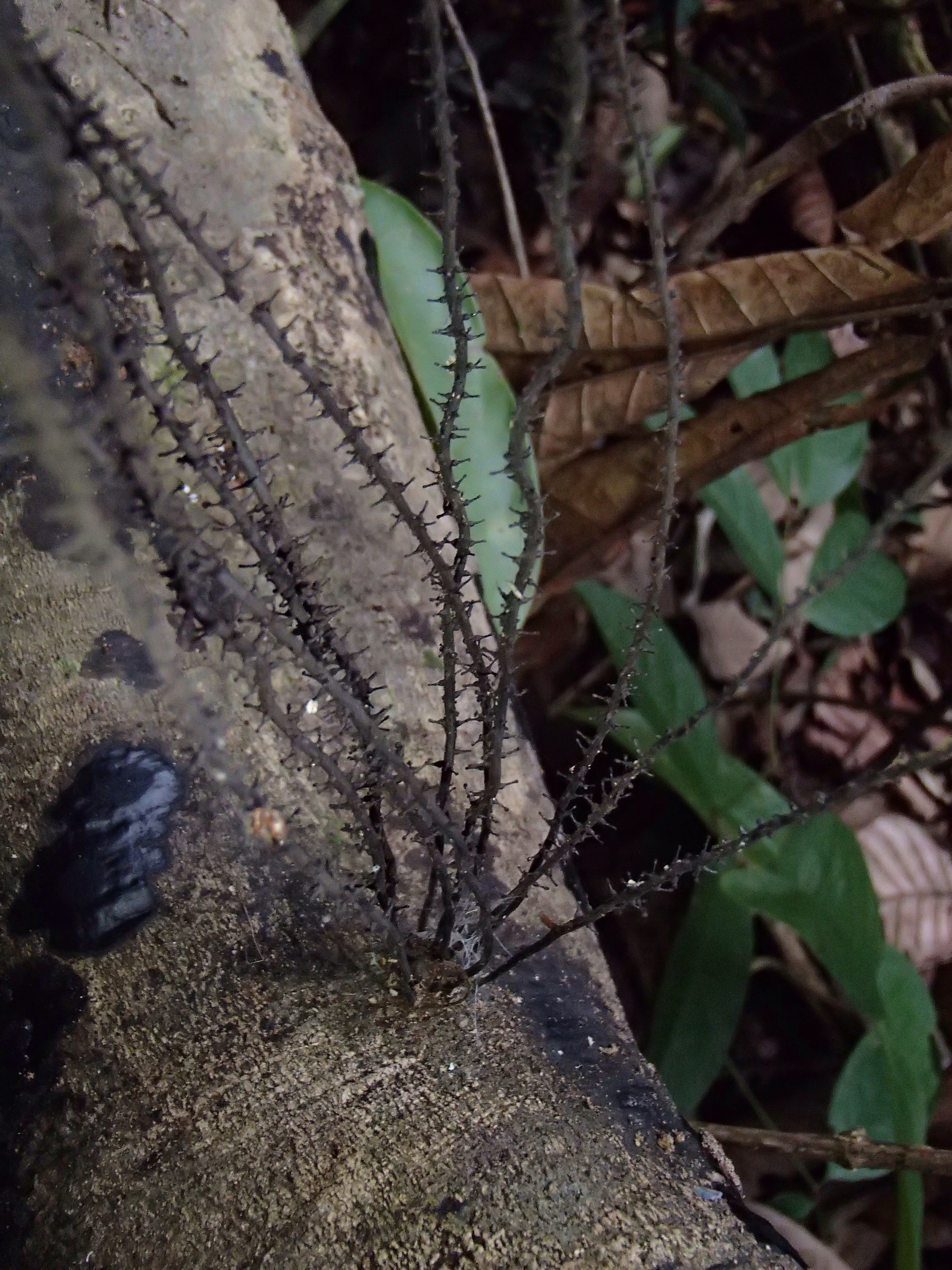
- Thamnomyces chordalis group

Scientific classification
- Kingdom: Fungi
- Division: Ascomycota
- Class: Sordariomycetes
- Order: Xylariales
- Family: Xylariaceae
- Genus: Thamnomyces; Ehrenb.

Type species
- Thamnomyces chamissonis Ehrenb.

= Thamnomyces =

Genus of fungi

Thamnomyces is a genus of fungi in the family Xylariaceae. First described by German botanist Christian Gottfried Ehrenberg in 1820, as of 2008, the genus contains four or five species.
