= Apiocamarops =

Scientific classification
- Kingdom: Fungi
- Division: Ascomycota
- Class: Sordariomycetes
- Order: Boliniales
- Family: Boliniaceae
- Genus: Apiocamarops; Samuels & J.D. Rogers

Type species
- Apiocamarops alba Samuels & J.D. Rogers

Species
- Apiocamarops alba Apiocamarops cryptocellula Apiocamarops pulvinata

Genus of fungi

Apiocamarops is a genus of fungi within the Boliniaceae family.
