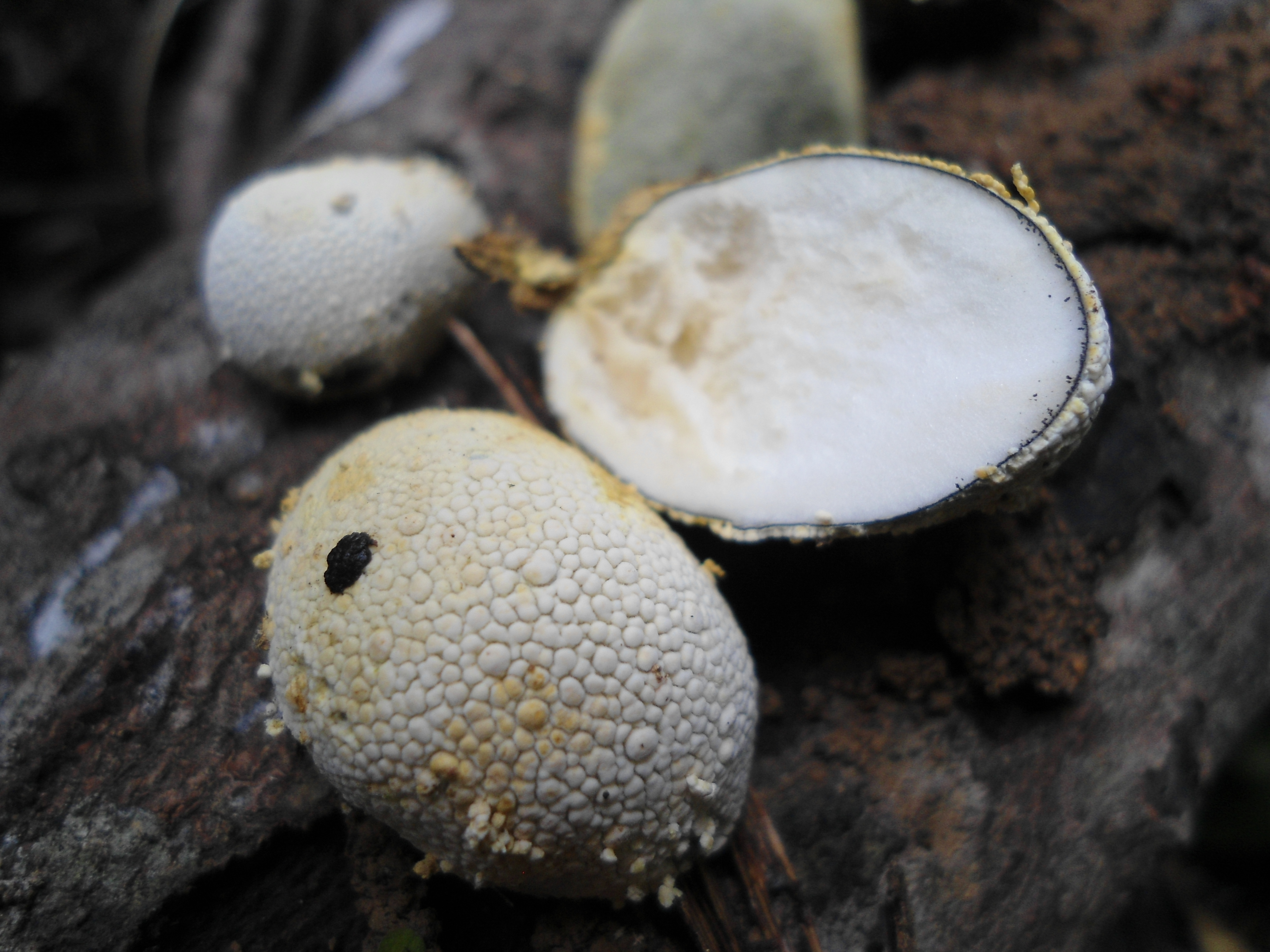
- Sarcoxylon compunctum (Jungh.) Cooke

Scientific classification
- Kingdom: Fungi
- Division: Ascomycota
- Class: Sordariomycetes
- Order: Xylariales
- Family: Xylariaceae
- Genus: Sarcoxylon; Cooke

Type species
- Sarcoxylon compunctum (Jungh.) Cooke

= Sarcoxylon =

Genus of fungi

Sarcoxylon is a genus of fungi in the family Xylariaceae.
