= Guestia gonetropospora =

Scientific classification
- Kingdom: Fungi
- Division: Ascomycota
- Class: Sordariomycetes
- Order: Xylariales
- Family: Xylariaceae
- Genus: Guestia; G.J.D. Sm. & K.D. Hyde
- Species: G. gonetropospora

Binomial name
- Guestia gonetropospora G.J.D. Smith & K.D. Hyde

Species of fungus

Guestia is a genus of sac fungi in the family Xylariaceae. This is a monotypic genus, containing the single species Guestia gonetropospora.

The genus name of Guestia is in honour of David I. Guest (fl. 1997), an Australisian botanist (Mycology) and plant pathologist from the School of Botany in the University of Melbourne as well as at the Sydney Institute of Agriculture at the University of Sydney.

The genus was circumscribed by Gavin J.D. Smith and Kevin D. Hyde in Fungal Diversity vol.7 on page 107 in 2001.
