= Holttumochloa =

Scientific classification
- Kingdom: Plantae
- Clade: Tracheophytes
- Clade: Angiosperms
- Clade: Monocots
- Clade: Commelinids
- Order: Poales
- Family: Poaceae
- Subfamily: Bambusoideae
- Tribe: Bambuseae
- Subtribe: Holttumochloinae
- Genus: Holttumochloa; K.M.Wong

Genus of grasses

Holttumochloa is a genus of Malaysian bamboos in the grass family native to the hill forests of Peninsular Malaysia. It is sometimes included in the genus Bambusa.

The genus name of Holttumochloa is in honour of Richard Eric Holttum (1895–1990), who was an English botanist and author.

Species

- Holttumochloa korbuensis K.M.Wong - Perak
- Holttumochloa magica (Ridl.) K.M.Wong - Pahang
- Holttumochloa pubescens K.M.Wong - Kelantan
