= Apiorhynchostoma =

Scientific classification
- Kingdom: Fungi
- Division: Ascomycota
- Class: Sordariomycetes
- Order: Boliniales
- Family: Boliniaceae
- Genus: Apiorhynchostoma; Petr.

Type species
- Apiorhynchostoma apiculata (Curr.) Petr.

Genus of fungi

Apiorhynchostoma is a genus of fungi in the family Boliniaceae; according to the 2007 Outline of Ascomycota. The placement was confirmed in 2020.

== Species ==
As accepted by Species Fungorum;

- Apiorhynchostoma altipetum (Peck) Rappaz (1995)
- Apiorhynchostoma apiculatum (Sacc.) Petr. (1923)
- Apiorhynchostoma tumulatum (Sacc.) Sivan. (1975)

Former species;

- A. apiosporum S.K. Huang & K.D. Hyde (2021) = Apiorhynchostoma apiculatum
- A. curreyi E. Müll. (1962) = Apiorhynchostoma apiculatum
- A. occultum Réblová (1998) = Endoxyla occulta Boliniaceae
