= Pseudovalsaria =

Scientific classification
- Kingdom: Fungi
- Division: Ascomycota
- Class: Sordariomycetes
- Order: Boliniales
- Family: Boliniaceae
- Genus: Pseudovalsaria; Spooner

Type species
- Pseudovalsaria foedans (P. Karst.) Spooner

Species
- P. allantospora P. ferruginea P. peckii

Genus of fungi

Pseudovalsaria is a genus of fungi in the family Boliniaceae. The genus contains three species found in Europe and China.
