= Occultitheca =

Scientific classification
- Kingdom: Fungi
- Division: Ascomycota
- Class: Sordariomycetes
- Order: Xylariales
- Family: Xylariaceae
- Genus: Occultitheca; J.D. Rogers & Y.-M. Ju

Type species
- Occultitheca costaricensis J.D. Rogers & Y.M. Ju

Genus of fungi

Occultitheca is a genus of fungi in the family Xylariaceae.
