= Endoxyla =

Scientific classification
- Kingdom: Animalia
- Phylum: Arthropoda
- Class: Insecta
- Order: Lepidoptera
- Family: Cossidae
- Tribe: Xyleutini
- Genus: Endoxyla; Fuckel

Type species
- Endoxyla operculata (Alb. & Schwein.) Sacc.

Species
- See text.

Genus of fungi

Endoxyla is a genus of fungi within the Boliniaceae family.

== Species ==
As accepted by Species Fungorum;

- Endoxyla avocetta (Cooke & Ellis) A.I. Romero & Samuels (1991)
- Endoxyla capparis R. Rao (1972)
- Endoxyla excelsior (Mouton) Munk (1965)
- Endoxyla mallochii Unter., A. Carter & Réblová (2013)
- Endoxyla munkii Unter. (1993)
- Endoxyla occulta (Réblová) Unter. & Réblová (2013)
- Endoxyla operculata (Nitschke) Sacc. (1882)
- Endoxyla parallela (Fr.) Sacc. (1882)
- Endoxyla xanthostroma Unter. (1993)

Former species;

- E. cirrhosa (Pers.) E. Müll. & Arx (1954) = Lentomitella cirrhosa, Lentomitellaceae
- E. eutypoides (Ellis & Everh.) Ellis & Everh. (1892) = Eutypa eutypoides, Diatrypaceae
- E. fraxini (Ellis & Everh.) Ellis & Everh. (1892) = Cryptosphaeria eunomia, Diatrypaceae
- E. hyalostoma Munk (1965) = Ceratostomella hyalostoma, Boliniaceae
- E. laevirostris Munk (1966) = Natantiella ligneola, Sordariomycetes
- E. luteobasis (Ellis) M.E. Barr (1993) = Endoxylina luteobasis, Sordariomycetes
- E. rostrata (Tode) Munk (1957) = Ceratostomella rostrata, Boliniaceae
- E. vestita (Sacc.) Munk (1966) = Lentomitella cirrhosa, Lentomitellaceae
