= Holttumochloa magica =

Scientific classification
- Kingdom: Plantae
- Clade: Tracheophytes
- Clade: Angiosperms
- Clade: Monocots
- Clade: Commelinids
- Order: Poales
- Family: Poaceae
- Genus: Holttumochloa
- Species: H. magica

Binomial name
- Holttumochloa magica (Ridl.) K.M.Wong

Synonyms
- Bambusa elegans Ridl., 1905; Bambusa magica Ridl.

Species of grass

Holttumochloa magica is a species of bamboos native to the hill forests of Pahang in Peninsular Malaysia. It is the type species of its genus.
