= Ophiorosellinia =

Scientific classification
- Kingdom: Fungi
- Division: Ascomycota
- Class: Sordariomycetes
- Order: Xylariales
- Family: Xylariaceae
- Genus: Ophiorosellinia; J.D. Rogers, A. Hidalgio, F.A. Fernández & Huhndorf

Type species
- Ophiorosellinia costaricensis J.D. Rogers, A. Hidalgo, F.A. Fernández & Huhndorf

Genus of fungi

Ophiorosellinia is a genus of fungi in the family Xylariaceae. This is a monotypic genus, containing the single species Ophiorosellinia costaricensis.
