= Paramphisphaeria =

Scientific classification
- Kingdom: Fungi
- Division: Ascomycota
- Class: Sordariomycetes
- Order: Xylariales
- Family: Xylariaceae
- Genus: Paramphisphaeria; F.A. Fernández, J.D. Rogers, Y.-M. Ju, Huhndorf & L. Umana

Type species
- Paramphisphaeria costaricensis F.A. Fernández, J.D. Rogers, Y.M. Ju, Huhndorf & L. Umaña

Genus of fungi

Paramphisphaeria is a genus of fungi in the family Xylariaceae. This is a monotypic genus, containing the single species Paramphisphaeria costaricensis.
