= Stereosphaeria =

Scientific classification
- Kingdom: Fungi
- Division: Ascomycota
- Class: Sordariomycetes
- Order: Xylariales
- Family: Xylariaceae
- Genus: Stereosphaeria; Kirschst.

Type species
- Stereosphaeria phloeophila Kirschst.

Genus of fungi

Stereosphaeria is a genus of fungi in the family Xylariaceae.
