= Anthostomella =

Scientific classification
- Kingdom: Fungi
- Division: Ascomycota
- Class: Sordariomycetes
- Order: Xylariales
- Family: Xylariaceae
- Genus: Anthostomella; Sacc.

Type species
- Anthostomella limitata Sacc.

Genus of fungi

Anthostomella is a genus of fungi in the family Xylariaceae. The ascomata are simple and contain only a single perithecium.

== Species ==
Species include:

- Anthostomella limitata
- Anthostomella pullulans
