= Dianjunus =

- Ascocarps of Dianjunus rex

Scientific classification
- Kingdom: Fungi
- Division: Ascomycota
- Class: Sordariomycetes
- Order: Xylariales
- Family: Dianjunaceae
- Genus: Dianjunus; F.Q. Yu, Pérez-Moreno & Senan. (2026)
- Species: D. rex

Binomial name
- Dianjunus rex F.Q. Yu, Pérez-Moreno & Senan. (2026)

Monotypic genus of fungi

Dianjunus is a genus of fungi in the family Dianjunaceae. It is a monotypic genus, containing the single species Dianjunus rex, collected in 2024 in Yunnan, China, and described in 2026. Molecular evidence suggests that Dianjunus diverged from other members of the order Xylariales about 65 mya, and is sister to the Graphostromataceae. Dianjunus rex is found near the roots of Quercus variabilis, the Chinese cork oak, and has the largest fruiting body of any of the approximately 64,000 species within the phylum Ascomycota.
