= Adomia =

Scientific classification
- Kingdom: Fungi
- Division: Ascomycota
- Class: Sordariomycetes
- Order: Xylariales
- Genus: Adomia; S. Schatz

Type species
- Adomia avicenniae S. Schatz

Genus of fungi

Adomia is a genus of fungi in the Xylariales order of the Ascomycota. The relationship of this taxon to other taxa within the order is unknown (incertae sedis), and it has not yet been placed with certainty into any family. This is a monotypic genus, containing the single species Adomia avicenniae.
