= Gigantospora =

Scientific classification
- Kingdom: Fungi
- Division: Ascomycota
- Class: Sordariomycetes
- Order: Xylariales
- Family: Xylariaceae
- Genus: Gigantospora; B.S. Lu & K.D. Hyde

Type species
- Gigantospora gigaspora B.S. Lu & K.D. Hyde

Genus of fungi

Gigantospora is a genus of fungi in the family Xylariaceae. This is a monotypic genus, containing the single species Gigantospora gigaspora.
