= Diamantinia =

Scientific classification
- Kingdom: Fungi
- Division: Ascomycota
- Class: Sordariomycetes
- Order: Xylariales
- Genus: Diamantinia; A.N. Mill., Læssøe & Huhndorf

Type species
- Diamantinia citrina A.N. Mill., Læssøe & Huhndorf

Genus of fungi

Diamantinia is a genus of fungi in the Xylariales order of the Ascomycota. The relationship of this taxon to other taxa within the order is unknown (incertae sedis), and it has not yet been placed with certainty into any family. This is a monotypic genus, containing the single species Diamantinia citrina.
