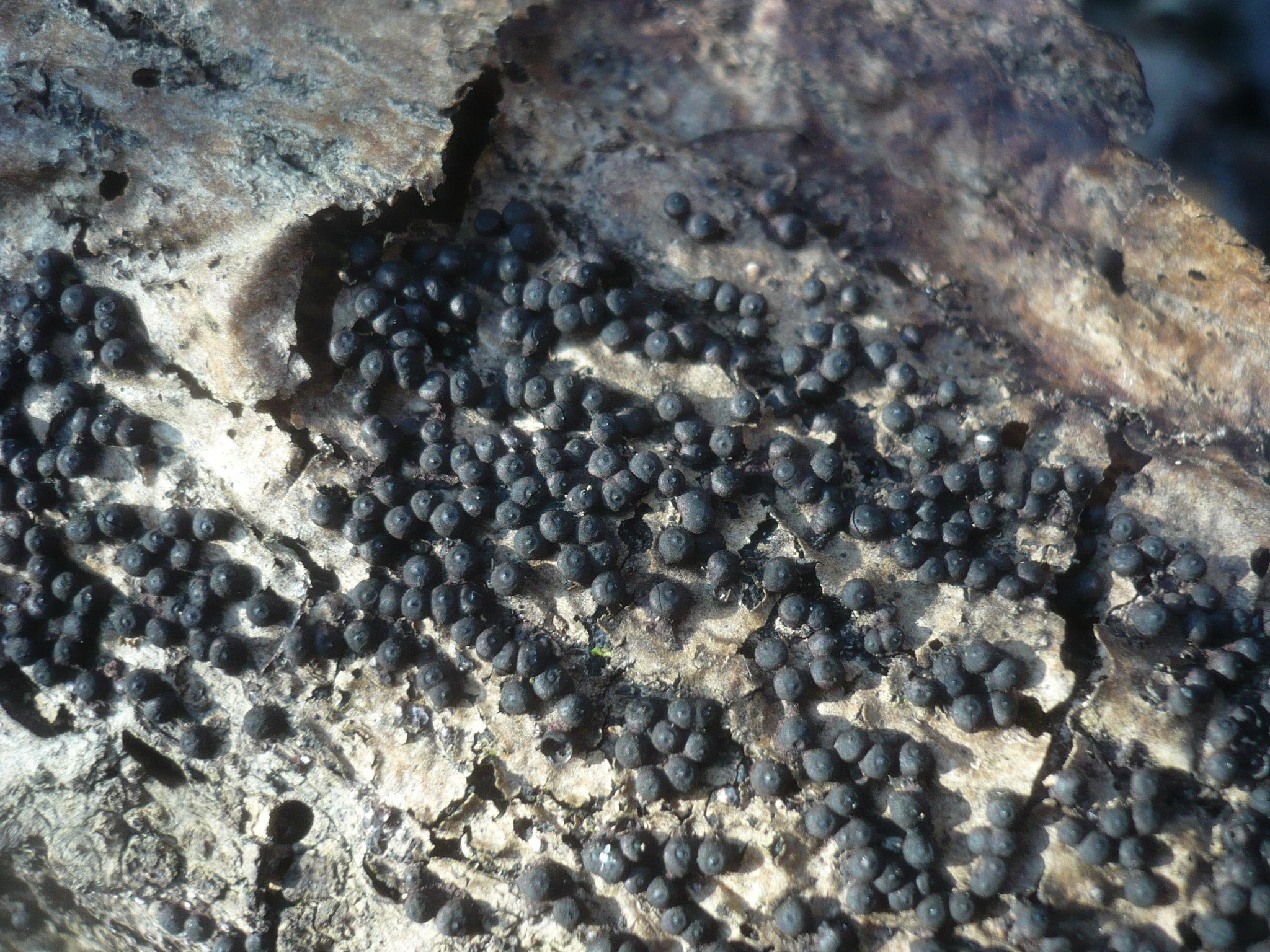
- R. mammiformis

Scientific classification
- Domain: Eukaryota
- Kingdom: Fungi
- Division: Ascomycota
- Class: Sordariomycetes
- Order: Xylariales
- Family: Xylariaceae
- Genus: Rosellinia; De Not. (1844)

Type species
- Rosellinia aquila (Fr.) Ces. & De Not.

Species
- See text

Synonyms
- Byssitheca Bonord. (1864)

= Rosellinia =

Genus of fungi

Rosellinia is a genus of fungi in the family Xylariaceae consisting of over 90 species. Several of the species in this genus are plant pathogens. Fossils of Rosellinia have been found in 12 million year old rocks from central England.

The genus was circumscribed by Giuseppe De Notaris in Giorn. Bot. Ital. vol.1 (Issue 1) on page 334 in 1844.

The genus name of Rosellinia is in honour of Ferdinando Pio Rosellini (1814–1872), who was an Italian mathematician and botanist.

== Species ==
This is a complete listing of all currently accepted species in Rosellinia, based on the 2005 study by Petrini and Petrini.

R. abscondita — R. aquila — R. arcuata — R. asperata — R. beccariana — R. bicolor — R. bonaerensis — R. bothryna — R. breensis — R. brevifissurata — R. britannica — R. bunodes — R. buxi — R. canzacotoana — R. caudata — R. chusqueae — R. communis — R. congesta — R. corticium — R. culmicola — R. decipiens — R. desmacutispora — R. desmazieresii — R. diathrausta — R. dingleyae — R. dolichospora — R. emergens — R. erianthi — R. etrusca — R. eucalypticola — R. euterpes — R. evansii — R. formosana — R. franciscae — R. freycinetiae — R. gigantea — R. gigaspora — R. gisborniae — R. glabra — R. griseo-cincta — R. helvetica — R. herpotrichoides — R. horrida — R. hughesii — R. hyalospora — R. immersa — R. indica — R. johnstonii — R. lamprostoma — R. longispora — R. macdonaldii — R. macrosperma — R. macrospora — R. mammiformis — R. mammoidea — R. markhamiae — R. mastoidiformis — R. medullaris — R. megaloecia — R. megalosperma — R. megalospora — R. merillii — R. mimosae — R. musispora — R. mycophila — R. necatrix — R. nectrioides — R. nothofagi — R. novae-zelandiae — R. palmae — R. paraguayensis — R. pardalios — R. pepo — R. perusensis — R. petrakii — R. petrinii — R. picta — R. procera — R. puiggiarii — R. radiciperda — R. rhopalostilicola — R. rhypara — R. rickii — R. saccardii — R. samuelsii — R. sancta-cruciana — R. stenasca — R. subiculata — R. subsimilis — R. thelena — R. thelena var. microspora — R. thindii — R. victoriae
