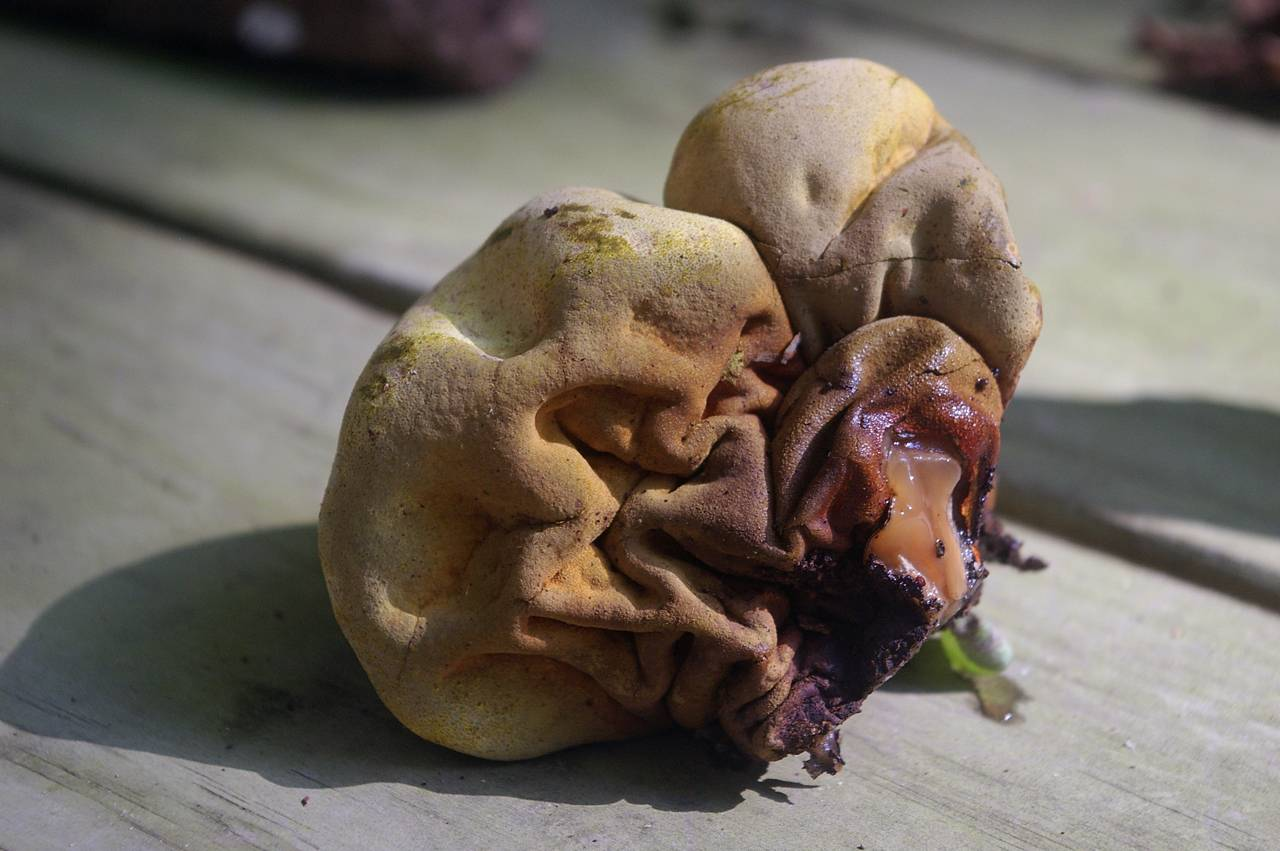
- Entonaema liquescens

Scientific classification
- Kingdom: Fungi
- Division: Ascomycota
- Class: Sordariomycetes
- Order: Xylariales
- Family: Hypoxylaceae
- Genus: Entonaema; A.Möller (1901)

Type species
- Entonaema mesenterica A.Möller (1901)

Species
- E. dengii E. globosum E. liquescens E. moluccanum E. pallida E. siamensis

= Entonaema =

Genus of fungi

Entonaema is a genus of fungi in the family Hypoxylaceae. The genus is widespread, especially in tropical areas, and contains six species.
