= Palmicola =

Scientific classification
- Kingdom: Fungi
- Division: Ascomycota
- Class: Sordariomycetes
- Order: Xylariales
- Genus: Palmicola; K.D. Hyde

Type species
- Palmicola archontophoenicis K.D. Hyde

Genus of fungi

Palmicola is a genus of fungi in the Xylariales order of the Ascomycota. The relationship of this taxon to other taxa within the order is unknown (incertae sedis), and it has not yet been placed with certainty into any family.
