= Cyanopulvis =

Scientific classification
- Kingdom: Fungi
- Division: Ascomycota
- Class: Sordariomycetes
- Order: Xylariales
- Family: Xylariaceae
- Genus: Cyanopulvis; J. Fröhl. & K.D. Hyde

Type species
- Cyanopulvis australiensis J. Fröhl. & K.D. Hyde

Genus of fungi

Cyanopulvis is a genus of fungi in the family Xylariaceae. This is a monotypic genus, containing the single species Cyanopulvis australiensis.
