= Pidoplitchkoviella =

Scientific classification
- Kingdom: Fungi
- Division: Ascomycota
- Class: Sordariomycetes
- Order: Xylariales
- Family: Xylariaceae
- Genus: Pidoplitchkoviella; Kiril.

Type species
- Pidoplitchkoviella terricola Kiril.

Genus of fungi

Pidoplitchkoviella is a genus of fungi in the family Xylariaceae. This is a monotypic genus, containing the single species Pidoplitchkoviella terricola.

The genus name of Pidoplitchkoviella is in honour of Nikolai (Mykola) Makarovich Pidoplichko (*russ. Николай Макарович Пидопличко) (1904-1975), who was a Russian-Ukrainian botanist (Mycology), who taught at the Veterinary-Zoologolical Institute in Kiev.

The genus was circumscribed by T.S. Kirilenko in Mikrobiol. Zurn. vol.37 on page 603 in 1975.
