= Lasiobertia =

Scientific classification
- Kingdom: Fungi
- Division: Ascomycota
- Class: Sordariomycetes
- Order: Xylariales
- Genus: Lasiobertia; Sivan.

Type species
- Lasiobertia africana Sivan.

Genus of fungi

Lasiobertia is a genus of fungi in the Xylariales order of the Ascomycota. The relationship of this taxon to other taxa within the order is unknown (incertae sedis), and it has not yet been placed with certainty into any family.
