= Poroleprieuria =

Scientific classification
- Kingdom: Fungi
- Division: Ascomycota
- Class: Sordariomycetes
- Order: Xylariales
- Family: Xylariaceae
- Genus: Poroleprieuria; M.C. Gonzáles, Hanlin, Ulloa & E. Aguirre

Type species
- Poroleprieuria rogersii M.C. González, Hanlin, Ulloa & Elv. Aguirre

Genus of fungi

Poroleprieuria is a genus of fungi in the family Xylariaceae. This is a monotypic genus, containing the single species Poroleprieuria rogersii.
