= Stromatoneurospora =

Scientific classification
- Kingdom: Fungi
- Division: Ascomycota
- Class: Sordariomycetes
- Order: Xylariales
- Family: Xylariaceae
- Genus: Stromatoneurospora; S.C. Jong & E.E. Davis

Type species
- Stromatoneurospora phoenix (Kunze) S.C. Jong & E.E. Davis

Genus of fungi

Stromatoneurospora is a genus of fungi in the family Xylariaceae.
