= Fassia =

Scientific classification
- Domain: Eukaryota
- Kingdom: Fungi
- Division: Ascomycota
- Class: Sordariomycetes
- Order: Xylariales
- Family: Xylariaceae
- Genus: Fassia; R.W.G.Dennis, 1964
- Species: F. scabrosa

Binomial name
- Fassia scabrosa Dennis

Genus of fungi

Fassia is a genus of fungi in the family Xylariaceae. This is a monotypic genus, containing the single species Fassia scabrosa.
