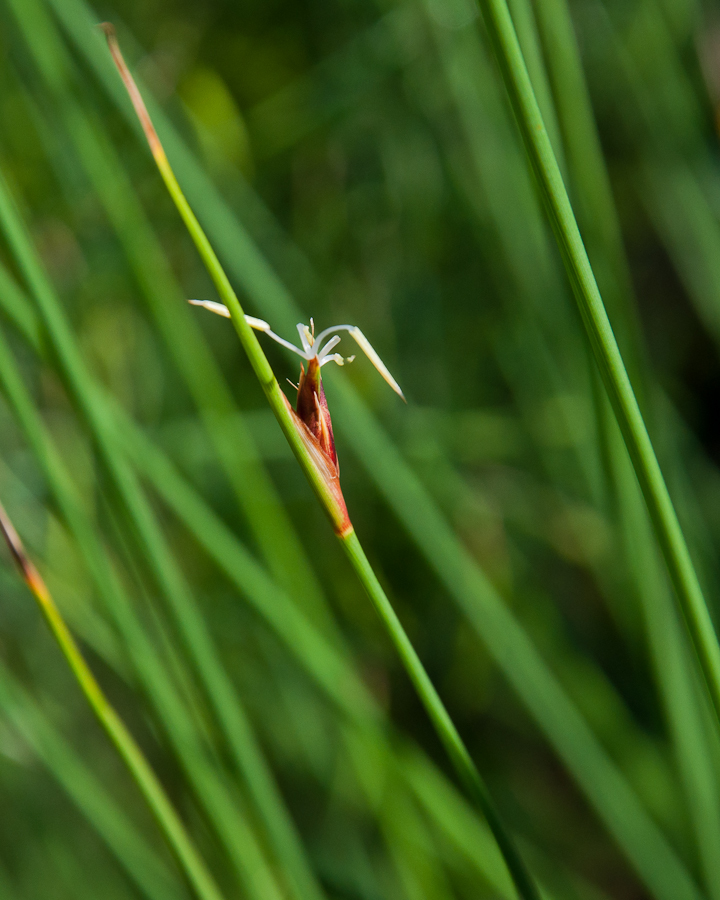

Conservation status
- Least Concern (SANBI Red List)

Scientific classification
- Kingdom: Plantae
- Clade: Tracheophytes
- Clade: Angiosperms
- Clade: Monocots
- Clade: Commelinids
- Order: Poales
- Family: Cyperaceae
- Genus: Neesenbeckia; Levyns
- Species: N. punctoria

Binomial name
- Neesenbeckia punctoria (Vahl) Levyns

Synonyms
- Buekia punctoria (Vahl) Nees; Chaetospora punctoria (Vahl) A.Dietr.; Elynanthus punctorius (Vahl) B.D.Jacks.; Schoenus punctorius Vahl; Tetraria punctoria (Vahl) C.B.Clarke

= Neesenbeckia =

Species of flowering plant

Neesenbeckia is a monotypic genus of flowering plants belonging to the family Cyperaceae. The only species is Neesenbeckia punctoria.

It is native to the Western Cape in South Africa.

== Taxonomy ==
The genus name of Neesenbeckia is in honour of Christian Gottfried Daniel Nees von Esenbeck (1776–1858), a prolific German botanist, physician, zoologist, and natural philosopher. The genus has one known synonym, Buekia Nees. The Latin specific epithet of punctoria is derived from punctus meaning pricked, punctured or pierced. Both the genus and species were first described and published in J. S. African Bot. Vol.13 on page 74 in 1947.

== Gallery ==
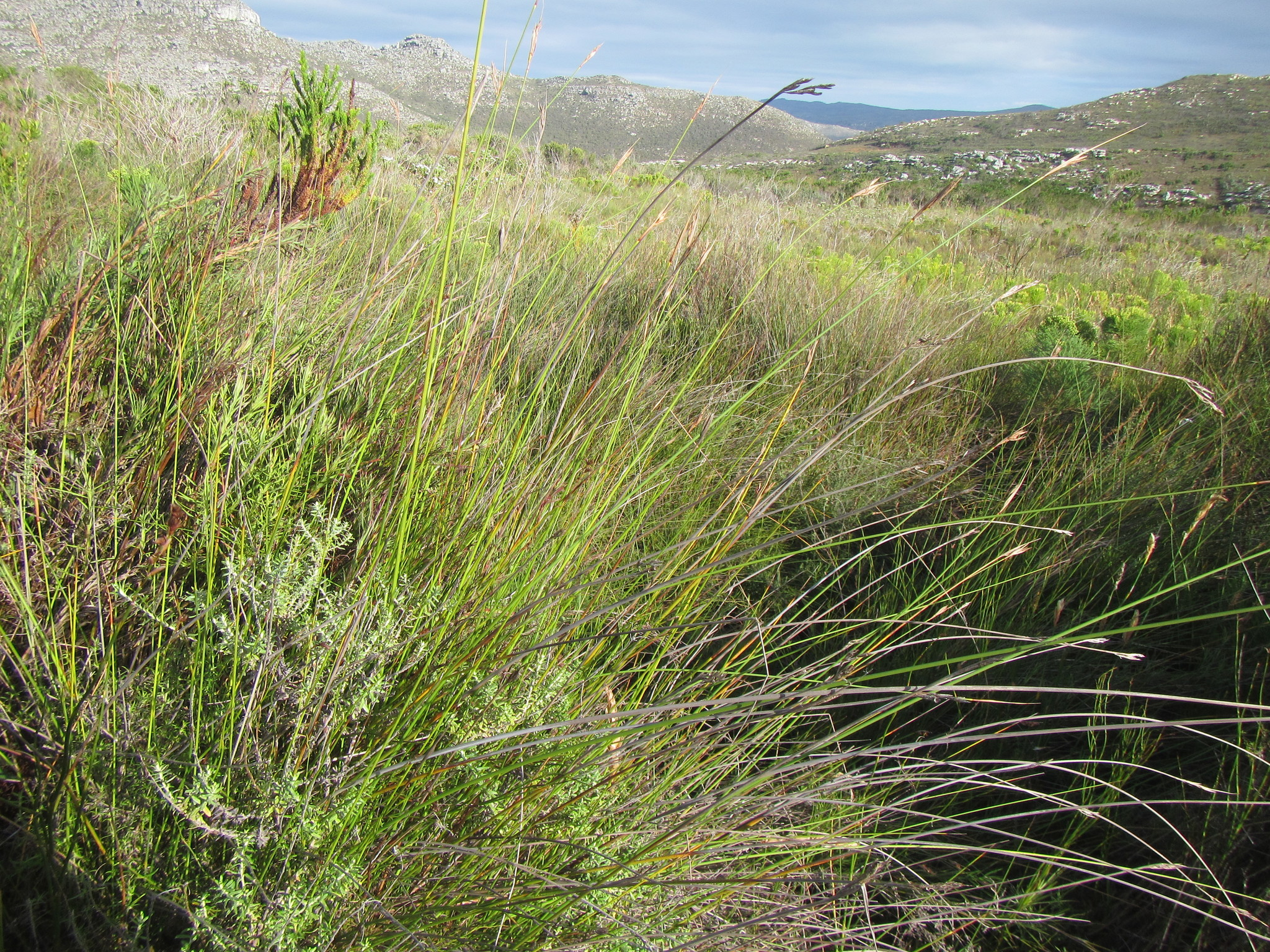
Plant in Table Mountain National Park

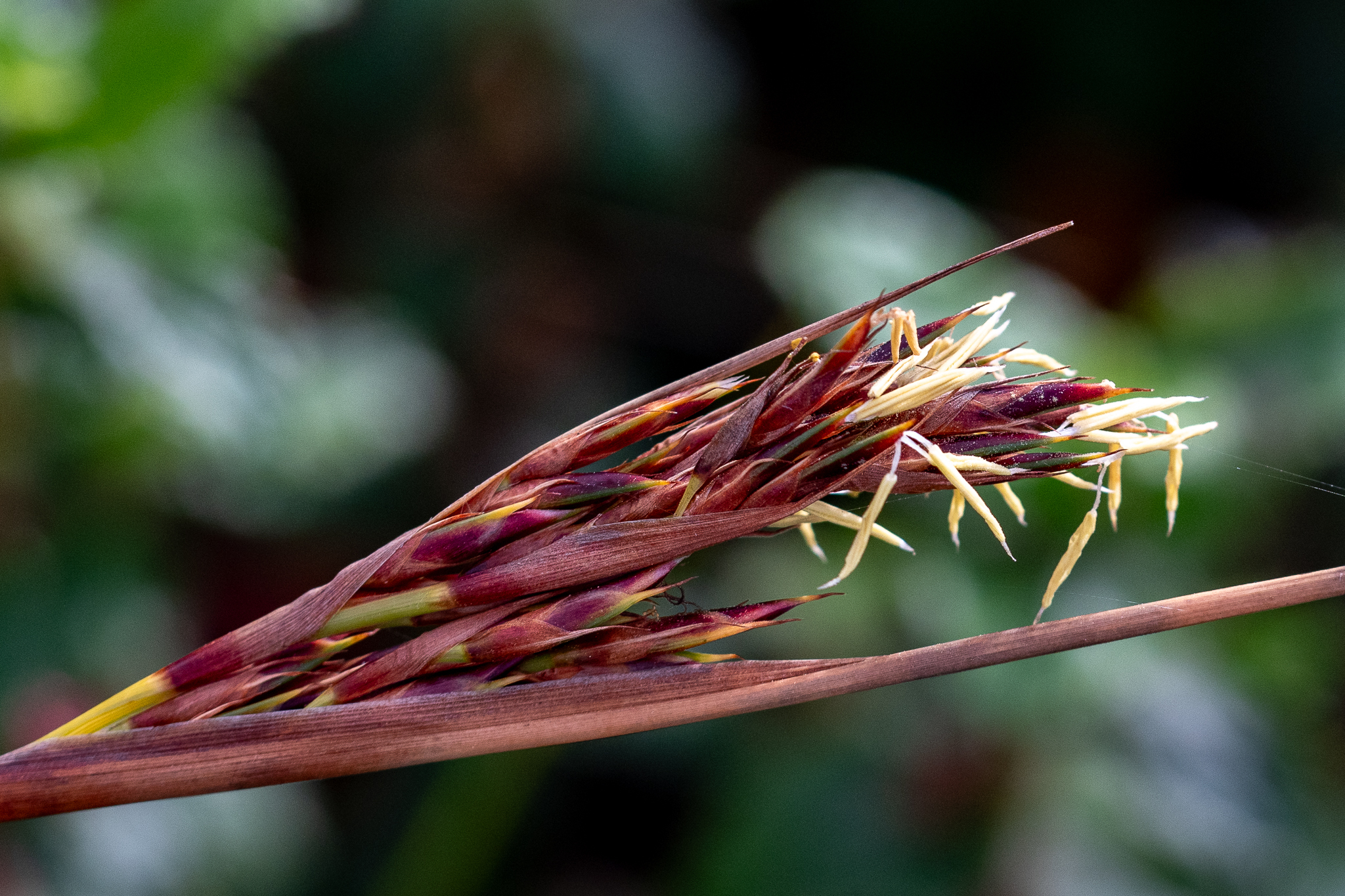
Matured seed husk

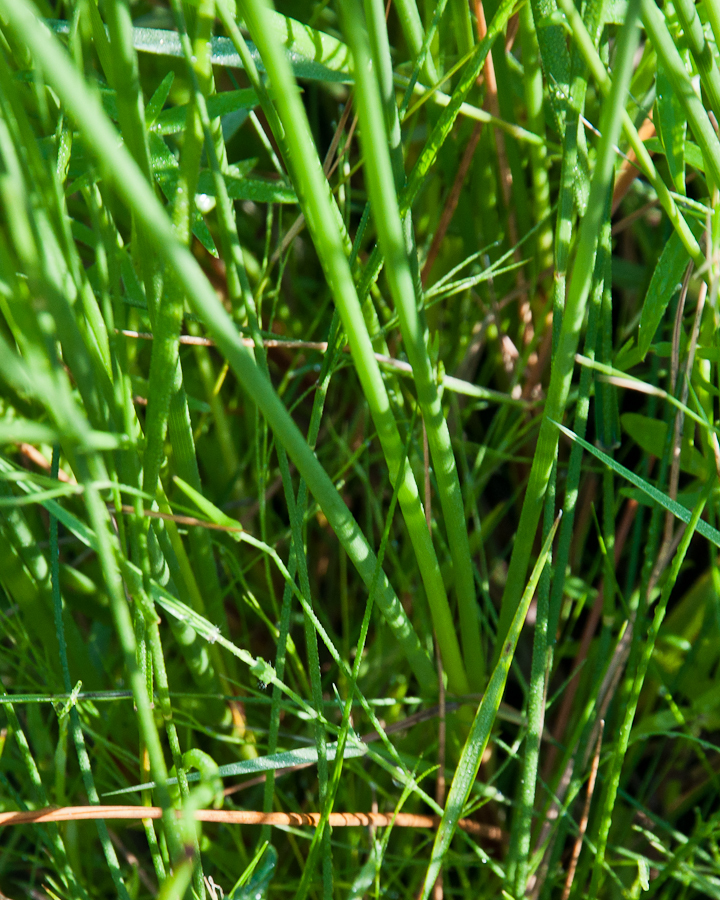
Close up of the stalks
