= Striatodecospora =

Scientific classification
- Kingdom: Fungi
- Division: Ascomycota
- Class: Sordariomycetes
- Order: Xylariales
- Family: Xylariaceae
- Genus: Striatodecospora; D.Q. Zhou, K.D. Hyde & BS. Lu

Type species
- Striatodecospora bambusae D.Q. Zhou, K.D. Hyde & B.S. Lu

Genus of fungi

Striatodecospora is a genus of fungi in the family Xylariaceae. This is a monotypic genus, containing the single species Striatodecospora bambusae.
