= Nipicola =

Scientific classification
- Kingdom: Fungi
- Division: Ascomycota
- Class: Sordariomycetes
- Order: Xylariales
- Family: Xylariaceae
- Genus: Nipicola; K.D. Hyde

Type species
- Nipicola carbospora K.D. Hyde

Genus of fungi

Nipicola is a genus of fungi in the family Xylariaceae.
