= Yuea =

Scientific classification
- Kingdom: Fungi
- Division: Ascomycota
- Class: Sordariomycetes
- Order: Xylariales
- Genus: Yuea; O.E.Erikss. (2003)

Type species
- Yuea chusqueicola O.E.Erikss. (2003)

Genus of fungi

Yuea is a genus of fungi in the Xylariales order of the Ascomycota. The relationship of this taxon to other taxa within the order is unknown (incertae sedis), and it has not yet been placed with certainty into any family. Yuea is a monotypic, containing the single species Y. chusqueicola.
