= Sabalicola =

Scientific classification
- Kingdom: Fungi
- Division: Ascomycota
- Class: Sordariomycetes
- Order: Xylariales
- Family: Xylariaceae
- Genus: Sabalicola; K.D. Hyde

Type species
- Sabalicola sabalensioides (Ellis & G. Martin) K.D. Hyde

Genus of fungi

Sabalicola is a genus of fungi in the family Xylariaceae. This is a monotypic genus, containing the single species Sabalicola sabalensioides.
