= Chaenocarpus =

Scientific classification
- Kingdom: Fungi
- Division: Ascomycota
- Class: Sordariomycetes
- Order: Xylariales
- Family: Xylariaceae
- Genus: Chaenocarpus; Rebent.

Type species
- Chaenocarpus setosus (Roth) Rebent.

Genus of fungi

Chaenocarpus is a genus of fungi in the family Xylariaceae.
