= Curvatispora =

Scientific classification
- Kingdom: Fungi
- Division: Ascomycota
- Class: Sordariomycetes
- Informal group: Sordariomycetes incertae sedis
- Genus: Curvatispora; V.V.Sarma & K.D.Hyde (2001)

Type species
- Curvatispora singaporensis V.V.Sarma & K.D.Hyde (2001)

Genus of fungi

Curvatispora is a fungal genus in the class Sordariomycetes. The relationship of this taxon to other taxa within the class is unknown (incertae sedis). The genus is monotypic, containing the single species Curvatispora singaporensis, which was discovered growing on a fallen decaying frond of Livistona spinosa in Singapore.
