= Fassina =

Fassina is an Italian surname. Notable people with this surname include:

- Antonio Fassina (born 1945), Italian rally driver
- Guido Fassina (born 1991), Italian curler
- Jean Fassina (born 1936), French classical pianist
- Kaity Fassina (born 1990), Australian weightlifter
- Martina Fassina (born 1999), Italian basketball player
- Neil Fassina, Canadian academic
- Roberto Fassina (1952–2023), Italian curler and rally driver
- Stefano Fassina (born 1966), Italian politician
