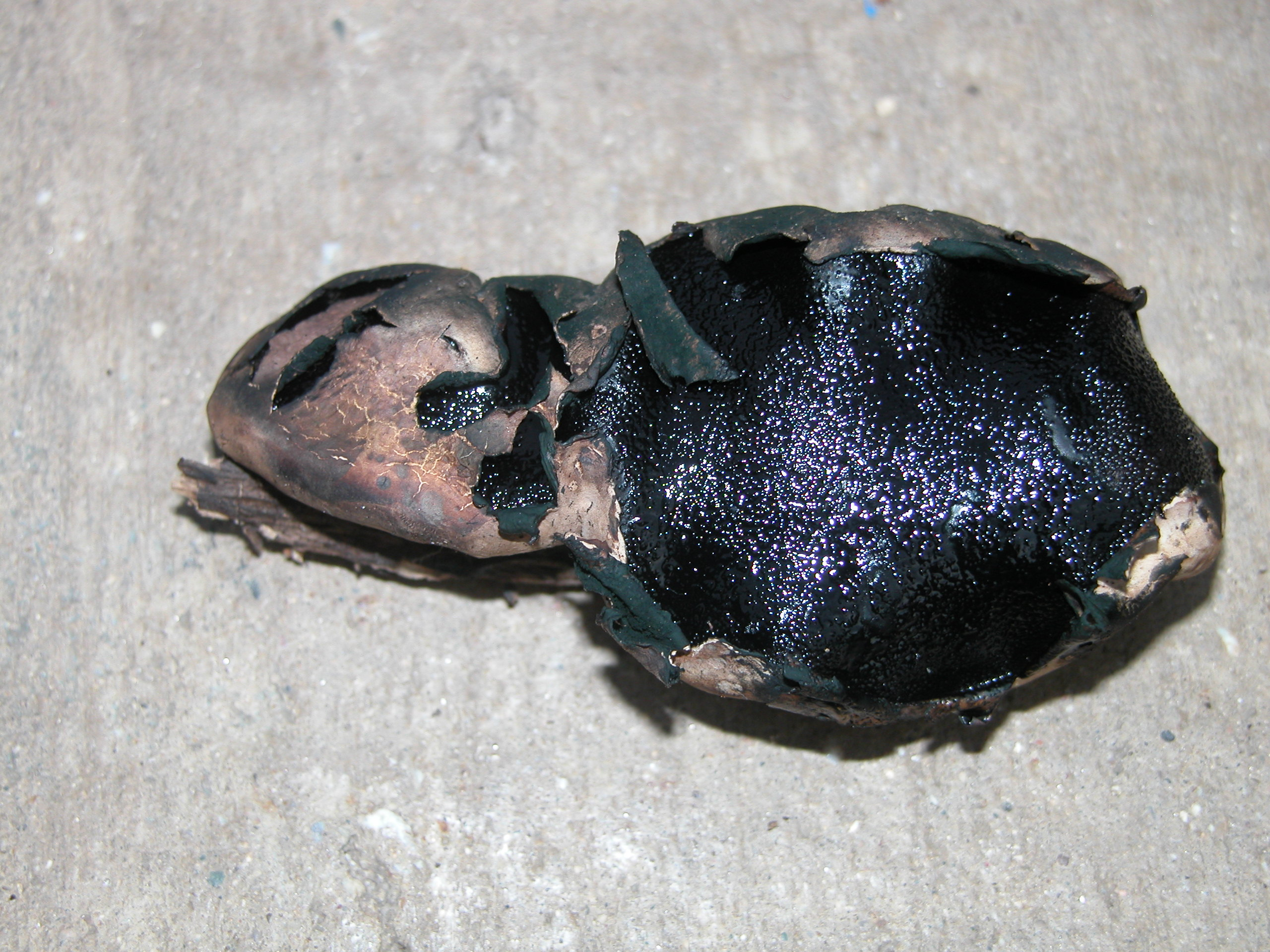
- Camarops petersii

Scientific classification
- Kingdom: Fungi
- Division: Ascomycota
- Class: Sordariomycetes
- Order: Boliniales
- Family: Boliniaceae; Rick

Type genus
- Bolinia (Nitschke) Sacc.

= Boliniaceae =

Family of fungi

The Boliniaceae are a family of fungi in the Boliniales order. The family consisted of seven genera and 40 species in 2008. A new study found more genera and species in 2020.

== Genera ==
As accepted by Wijayawardene et al. 2020 (with amount of species per genus);

- Apiocamarops Samuels & J.D. Rogers (4)
- Apiorhynchostoma Petr. (4)
- Camaropella Lar.N. Vassiljeva (2)
- Camarops P. Karst. (28) (includes Bolinia (Nitschke) Sacc.)
- Cornipulvina Huhndorf, A.N. Mill., F.A. Fernández & Lodge (1)
- Endoxyla Fuckel (3)
- Mollicamarops Lar.N. Vassiljeva (1)
- Neohypodiscus J.D. Rogers, Y.M. Ju & Læssøe (3)
- Pseudovalsaria Spooner (3)
