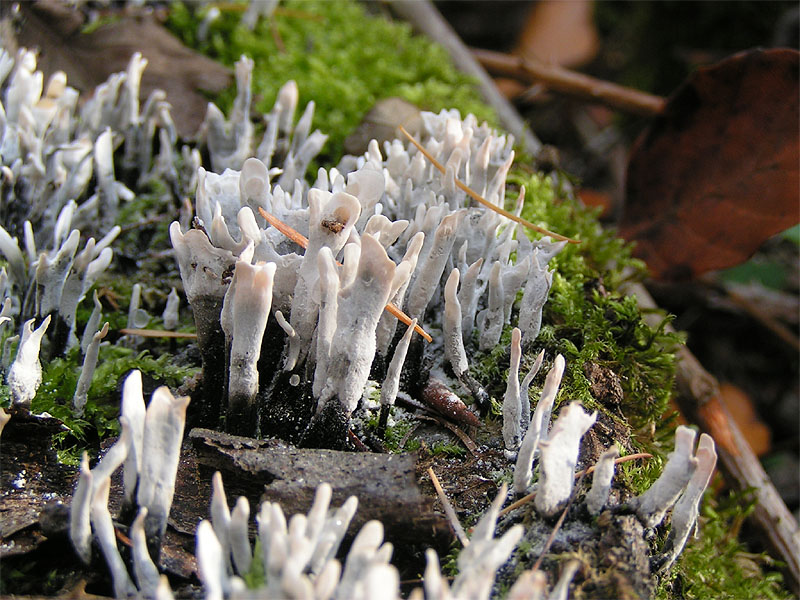
- Xylaria hypoxylon

Scientific classification
- Kingdom: Fungi
- Division: Ascomycota
- Class: Sordariomycetes
- Order: Xylariales
- Family: Xylariaceae; Tul. & C. Tul

Genera
- See text

= Xylariaceae =

Family of fungi

The Xylariaceae are a family of mostly small ascomycetous fungi. It is one of the most commonly encountered groups of ascomycetes and is found throughout the temperate and tropical regions of the world. They are typically found on wood, seeds, fruits, or plant leaves, some even associated with insect nests. Most decay wood and many are plant pathogens.

One example of this family is King Alfred's Cake (Daldinia concentrica).

Phylogenetic analyses published in 2009 suggest that there are two main lineages in this family, Hypoxyloideae and Xylarioideae.

== Genera ==
This is a complete list of genera in the Xylariaceae, based on the 2007 Outline of Ascomycota. A question mark before the genus name indicates that the placement of that taxon in this family is uncertain.

Amphirosellinia — Annulohypoxylon — Anthostomella — Appendixia — Areolospora — ?Ascotricha — Ascovirgaria — Astrocystis — Barrmaelia — Biscogniauxia — Calceomyces — Camillea — Chaenocarpus — Collodiscula — Creosphaeria — Cyanopulvis — Daldinia — Discoxylaria — ?Emarcea — Engleromyces — Entoleuca — Entonaema — Euepixylon — Fasciatispora — Fassia — Gigantospora — Guestia — Halorosellinia — Helicogermslita — Holttumia — Hypocopra — Hypoxylon — Induratia — Jumillera — Kretzschmaria — Kretzschmariella — Leprieuria — ?Leptomassaria — Lopadostoma — Muscodor — Myconeesia — Nemania — Nipicola — Obolarina — Occultitheca — Ophiorosellinia — Pandanicola — Paramphisphaeria — ?Paucithecium — Phylacia — Pidoplitchkoviella — Podosordaria — Poroleprieuria — Poronia — Pyrenomyxa (=Pulveria) — Rhopalostroma — Rosellinia — Sabalicola — Sarcoxylon — ?Sclerodermatopsis — ?Seynesia — Spirodecospora — Stereosphaeria — Stilbohypoxylon — Striatodecospora — Stromatoneurospora — Thamnomyces — Theissenia — Thuemenella — Vivantia — Wawelia — Whalleya — Xylaria — Xylocoremium — Xylotumulus

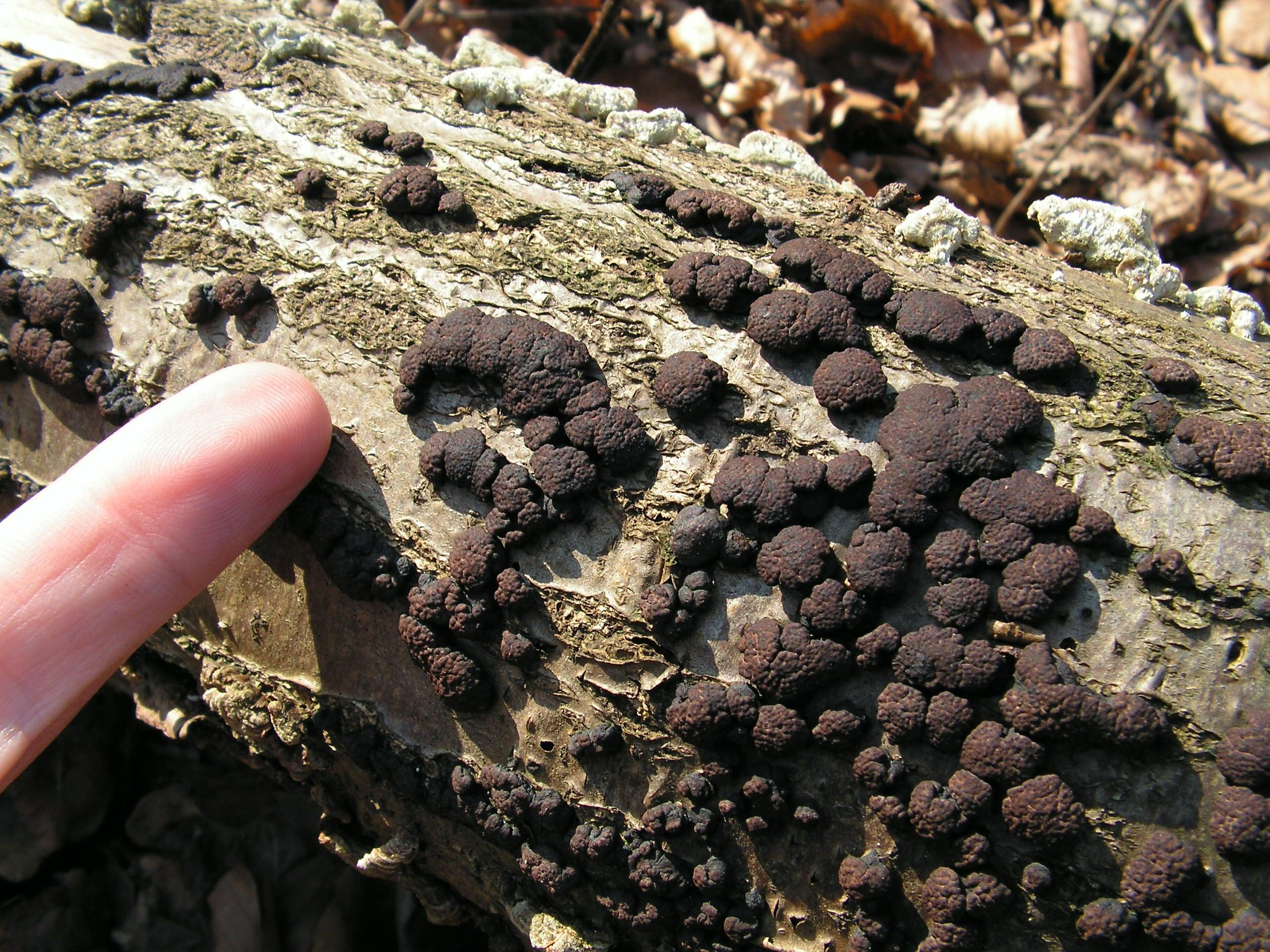
A representative of the genus Hypoxylon
