= Boliniales =

Scientific classification
- Domain: Eukaryota
- Kingdom: Fungi
- Division: Ascomycota
- Class: Sordariomycetes
- Subclass: Sordariomycetidae
- Order: Boliniales; P.F. Cannon. 2001

Families
- Boliniaceae

Order of fungi

The Boliniales are an order of fungi within the class Sordariomycetes.
