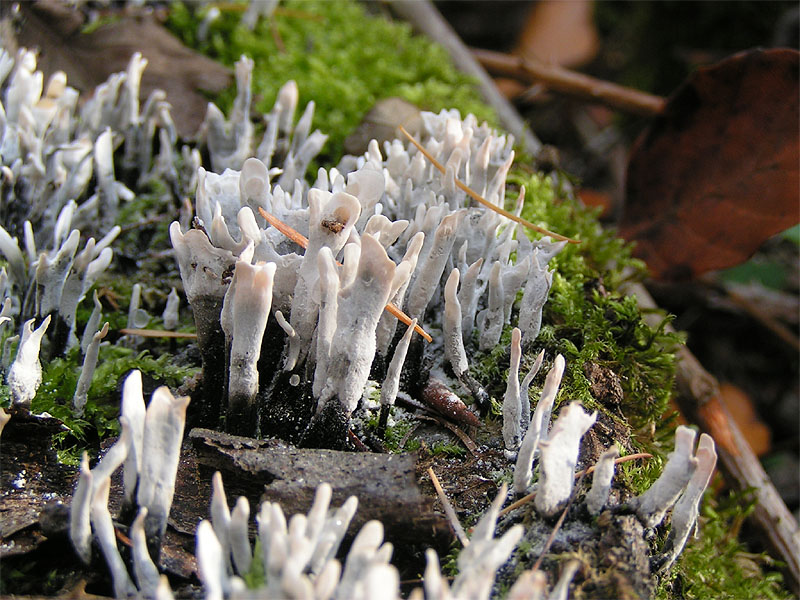
- Xylaria hypoxylon

Scientific classification
- Kingdom: Fungi
- Division: Ascomycota
- Class: Sordariomycetes
- Subclass: Xylariomycetidae
- Order: Xylariales; Nannf. (1932)

Families
- See text

= Xylariales =

Order of fungi

The Xylariales are an order of fungi within the class Sordariomycetes (also known as Pyrenomycetes), subdivision Pezizomycotina, division Ascomycota. It was the original order of the subclass Xylariomycetidae. Xylariales was circumscribed in 1932 by Swedish mycologist John Axel Nannfeldt, and Xylariomycetidae by Ove Erik Eriksson and Katarina Winka in 1997. As of 2024, the order includes 22 families and 164 genera. Fungi in the Xylariales have an atypical organisation of mating type genes and are prolific producers of secondary metabolites with potential applications in pharmaceuticals and agrochemicals.

== Taxonomy ==
Early classifications of the Xylariales varied considerably, with taxonomists recognising anywhere from three to eleven families within the order. A milestone in understanding the order's composition came from Smith, Liew, and Hyde's 2003 molecular phylogenetics study, which established the Xylariales as a monophyletic group containing seven families: Amphisphaeriaceae, Apiosporaceae, Clypeosphaeriaceae, Diatrypaceae, Graphostromataceae, Hyponectriaceae, and Xylariaceae. Dianjunaceae was erected in 2026 to contain the single species Dianjunus rex.

During this period, fungi in the order were characterised by several common morphological features. They typically possessed well-developed stromata (compact fungal tissues) and perithecial ascomata (flask-shaped fruiting bodies) with thick walls. Their asci, which contained eight spores, featured a distinctive apical structure that stained blue in iodine (a J+ reaction), and their paraphyses (specialised sterile filaments) were free at the tips and originated from the hymenium. The ascospores were often pigmented, with germ pores or slits, and sometimes had transverse divisions or a jelly-like coating. Their asexual forms (anamorphs) were mainly hyphomycetous, producing spores through a simple, budding process called holoblastic conidiation.

Historical taxonomic debates centred around several key issues. The Myelospermataceae, which was tentatively included by some authors in the early 2000s, lacked sufficient molecular evidence for definitive placement. Earlier proposals to elevate certain groups to ordinal status (such as Amphisphaeriales and Diatrypales) were rejected based on molecular evidence. The Apiosporaceae's inclusion, formally proposed in 1998, represented one of the newer additions to the order at the time.

The early molecular studies of the 2000s, while groundbreaking in establishing the monophyly of the order, also revealed limitations in using ribosomal DNA sequences for resolving family-level relationships within the Xylariales. This suggested either a relatively recent evolution of the group or slower evolutionary rates compared to other fungal orders. The relatively low genetic variation observed in commonly used molecular markers presented challenges for understanding the precise relationships between families, leaving many questions about internal phylogenetic structure unresolved. More recent molecular studies have revised and enhanced the understanding of relationships within the order, such as the 2018 study that revised the families Graphostromataceae, Hypoxylaceae, Lopadostomataceae and Xylariaceae. DNA analysis in 2018 confirmed the placement of the order and subclass, as sister to the order Amphisphaeriales in the subclass Xylariomycetidae.

The Xylariales represents a morphologically diverse group of fungi characterised by their complex stromatic structures and ecological roles as endophytes, pathogens, or saprobes. Molecular phylogenetic analyses suggest that Xylariales diverged from the related order Amphisphaeriales approximately 154 million years ago (MYA), during the Jurassic period, with the crown group of Xylariales estimated to have appeared around 147 MYA. This evolutionary timeline aligns with important diversification events, including the development of novel stromatic forms and pigmentation in ascospores, traits that distinguish many Xylariales species.

Ancestral state reconstruction studies indicate that early members of Xylariales likely had inconspicuous, immersed ascomata with hyaline, septate ascospores lacking germ slits. Over time, these ancestral traits evolved into the more conspicuous and diverse stromatic structures observed in extant species, reflecting adaptations to varied ecological niches. Today, Xylariales is a highly polyphyletic group, encompassing families with considerable morphological and ecological diversity. Ongoing phylogenetic research continues to refine the taxonomy of the order, revealing previously unrecognised lineages and resolving uncertainties about its classification.

== Genomics and mating systems ==
Genomic analyses of fungi in Xylariales have revealed an atypical organisation of mating type genes, diverging significantly from other members of the Pezizomycotina. Surveys of genomes from multiple Xylariales species, including economically important genera such as Xylaria and Daldinia, failed to identify canonical mating-type genes MAT1-1-1 and MAT1-1-2. While homologs of MAT1-2-1 and MAT1-1-3 genes were detected, these appear to be highly divergent, with some performing functions unrelated to mating. This suggests that mating and sexual development in Xylariales are controlled by mechanisms distinct from those observed in related fungal groups. The absence of significant divergence of traditional mating-type regions indicates potential evolutionary adaptations within Xylariales. It is hypothesised that these fungi might employ unisexual reproduction or alternative regulatory pathways for sexual development.

== Secondary metabolism ==
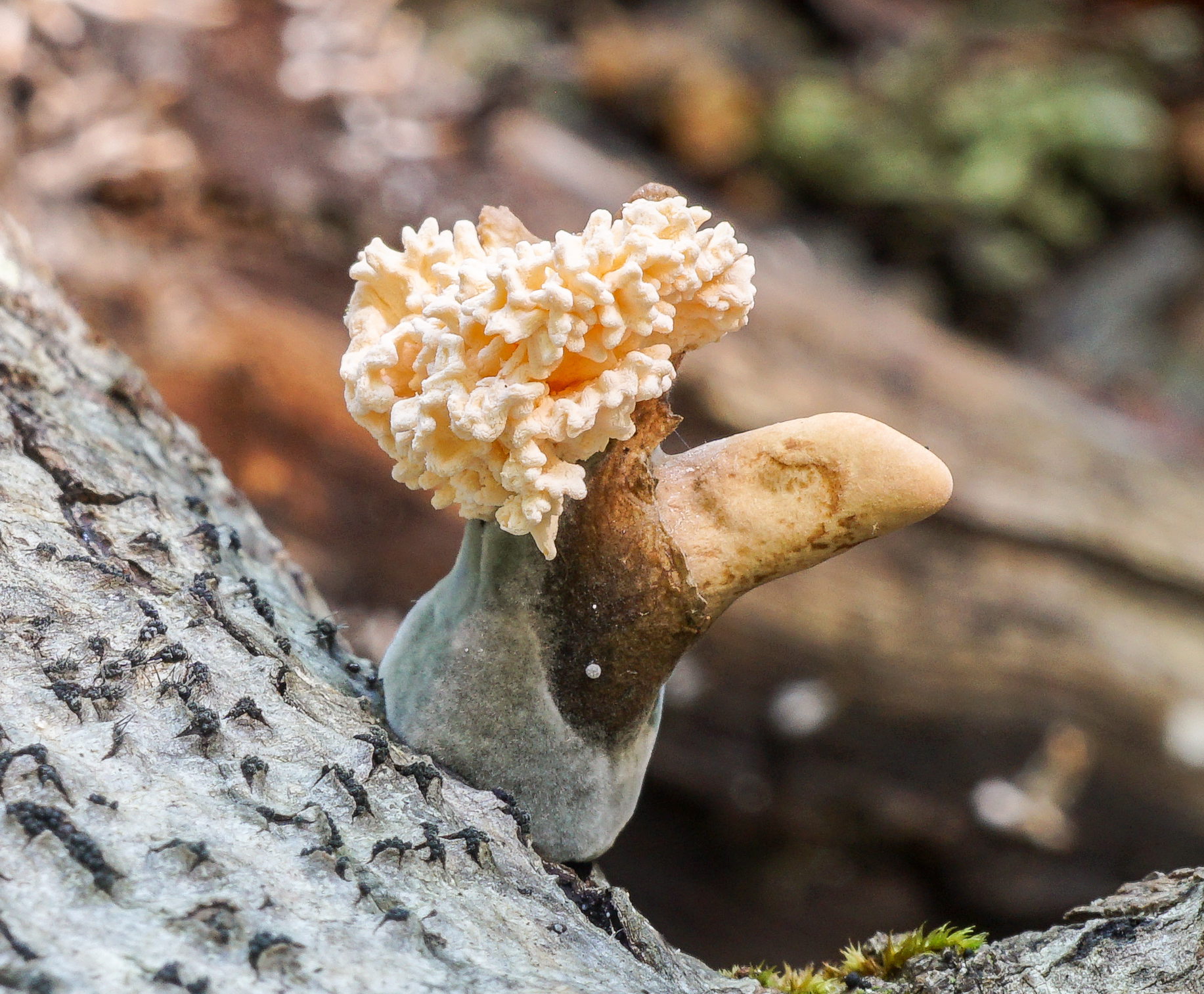
Xylaria cubensis

Fungi in the order Xylariales, particularly within the families Xylariaceae and Hypoxylaceae, are prolific producers of secondary metabolites, many of which exhibit bioactive properties. These compounds, often isolated from stromata and mycelial cultures, include unique carbon skeletons that have potential applications in pharmaceuticals, agrochemicals, and biological control. For example, the endophytic Xylariales have shown strong antagonistic effects against plant pathogens, making them candidates for developing environmentally friendly pest control solutions. Advances in genome sequencing have facilitated the identification of biosynthetic gene clusters, revealing insights into the molecular basis of these metabolites and opening new possibilities for synthetic biology applications.

Secondary metabolites produced by Xylariales encompass a broad spectrum of chemical classes, including terpenoids, polyketides, and nonribosomal peptides. Noteworthy discoveries include cytochalasans, which exhibit antifungal, cytotoxic, and phytotoxic properties. Some species, such as Xylaria cubensis, produce compounds with potent herbicidal activities, while others, like Hypoxylon fragiforme, generate cytochalasans that disrupt the cytoskeleton of eukaryotic cells in a reversible or irreversible manner depending on the compound.

The study of secondary metabolism in Xylariales has also contributed to advances in fungal taxonomy. For example, the production of specific metabolites, combined with molecular phylogenetic techniques, has clarified the evolutionary relationships within this group. These efforts have led to the reclassification of genera and the identification of new species. This integrated approach, which combines chemical, genetic, and ecological data, continues to expand the understanding of the functional biodiversity of Xylariales and their role in natural ecosystems.

== Families ==
The collaborative fungal classification compilation The 2024 Outline of Fungi and fungus-like taxa include 22 families and 164 genera in the Xylariales.

- Anungitiomycetaceae Crous (2019) (3 genera)
- Barrmaeliaceae Voglmayr & Jaklitsch (2018) (3)
- Cainiaceae J.C.Krug (1978) (8)
- Clypeosphaeriaceae G.Winter (1886) (7)
- Coniocessiaceae Asgari & Zare (2011) (5)
- Diatrypaceae Nitschke (1869) (30)
- Fasciatisporaceae S.N.Zhang, K.D.Hyde & J.K.Liu (2020) (1)
- Graphostromataceae M.E.Barr, J.D.Rogers & Y.M.Ju (1993) (5)
- Gyrotrichaceae Hern.-Restr. & Crous (2022) (5)
- Hansfordiaceae Crous (2019) (1)
- Hypoxylaceae DC. (1805) (19)
- Iodosphaeriaceae O.Hilber (2002) (1)
- Lopadostomataceae Daranag. & K.D.Hyde (2015) (5)
- Microdochiaceae Hern.-Restr., Crous & J.Z.Groenew. (2015) (6)
- Nothodactylariaceae Crous (2019) (1)
- Pallidoperidiaceae R.Sugita & Kaz.Tanaka (2024) (5)
- Polystigmataceae Höhn. ex Nannf. (1932) (1)
- Requienellaceae Boise (1986) (4)
- Spirodecosporaceae R.Sugita & Kaz.Tanaka (2022) (1)
- Vamsapriyaceae Y.R.Sun, Yong Wang bis & K.D.Hyde (2021) (6)
- Xyladictyochaetaceae Crous & Hern.-Restr (2018) (2)
- Xylariaceae Tul. & C.Tul. (1863) (42)
- Zygosporiaceae J.F.Li, Phookamsak & K.D.Hyde (2017) (4)

== Genera of uncertain placement ==
There are many genera in the Xylariales that are of uncertain familial placement (incertae sedis).

- Adomia S.Schatz (1985) – 1 sp.
- Alloanthostomella Daranag., Camporesi & K.D.Hyde (2016) – 1 sp.
- Anthostomella Sacc. (1875) – ca. 100 spp.
- Anungitea B.Sutton (1973) – ca. 20 spp.
- Ascotrichella Valldos. & Guarro (1988) – 1 sp.
- Basifimbria Subram. & Lodha (1968) – 3 spp.
- Basiseptospora Jaklitsch & Voglmayr (2016) – 1 sp.
- Bicellulospora W.L. Li, R.R.Liang & Jian K.Liu (2024) – 1 sp.
- Biporispora J.D.Rogers, Y.M.Ju & Cand. (1999) – 1 sp.
- Castellaniomyces Senan., Camporesi & K.D.Hyde (2017) – 1 sp.
- Catenuliconidia N.G.Liu & K.D.Hyde (2020) – 1 sp.
- Chaenocarpus Rebent. (1804) – 4 spp.
- Cryptostroma P.H.Greg. & S.Waller (1952) – 1 sp.
- Cyanopulvis J.Fröhl. & K.D.Hyde (2000) – 1 sp.
- Diamantinia A.N.Mill., Læssøe & Huhndorf (2003) – 1 sp.
- Gigantospora B.S.Lu & K.D.Hyde (2003) – 1 sp.
- Guayaquilia R.F.Castañeda, Magdana, D.Sosa & Hern.-Restr. (2020) – 1 sp.
- Guestia G.J.D.Sm. & K.D.Hyde (2001) – 1 sp.
- Hadrotrichum Fuckel (1865) – 15 spp.
- Haploanthostomella Konta & K.D.Hyde (2021) – 1 sp.
- Idriellopsis Hern.-Restr. & Crous (2015) – 1 sp.
- Kirstenboschia Quaedvl., Verkley & Crous (2013) – 1 sp.
- Lanceispora Nakagiri, Okane, Tad. Ito & Katum. (1997) – 2 spp.
- Lasiobertia Sivan. (1978) – 2 spp.
- Magnostiolata Samarak. & K.D.Hyde (2022) – 1 sp.
- Natonodosa Heredia, R.F.Castañeda & D.W.Li (2020) – 1 sp.
- Neoanthostomella D.Q.Dai & K.D.Hyde (2016) – 4 spp.
- Neobarrmaelia Crous (2022) – 2 spp.
- Neoidriella Hern.-Restr. & Crous (2015) – 1 sp.
- Neoleptodontidium Crous & Jurjević (2023) – 2 spp.
- Neotrichosphaeria Crous & Carnegie (2019) – 1 sp.
- Nipicola K.D.Hyde (1992) – 4 spp.
- Occultitheca J.D.Rogers & Y.M.Ju (2003) – 2 spp.
- Ophiorosellinia J.D.Rogers, A.Hidalgo, F.A.Fernández & Huhndorf (2004) – 1 sp.
- Palmicola K.D.Hyde (1993) – 4 spp.
- Pandanicola K.D.Hyde (1994) – 2 spp.
- Paraidriella Hern.-Restr. & Crous (2015) – 1 sp.
- Paramphisphaeria F.A.Fernández, J.D.Rogers, Y.M.Ju, Huhndorf & L.Umaña (2004) – 1 sp.
- Paucithecium Lloyd (1923) – 1 sp.
- Pidoplitchkoviella Kiril. (1975) – 1 sp.
- Polyancora Voglmayr & Yule (2006) – 1 sp.
- Poroleprieuria M.C.González, Hanlin, Ulloa & Elv.Aguirre (2004) – 1 sp.
- Pseudoanthostomella Daranag., Camporesi & K.D.Hyde (2016) – 5 spp.
- Pseudophloeospora Crous & R.G.Shivas (2010) – 4 spp.
- Pulmosphaeria Joanne E.Taylor, K.D.Hyde & E.B.G.Jones (1996) – 1 sp.
- Pyriformiascoma Daranag., Camporesi & K.D.Hyde (2015) – 1 sp.
- Roselymyces Fiúza, C.R.Silva, R.F.Castañeda & Gusmão (2018) – 1 sp.
- Sabalicola K.D.Hyde (1995) – 1 sp.
- Sporidesmina Subram. & Bhat (1989) – 1 sp.
- Striatodecospora D.Q.Zhou, K.D.Hyde & B.S.Lu (2000) – 1 sp.
- Stromatoneurospora S.C.Jong & E.E.Davis (1973) – 2 spp.
- Subanthostomella S.N.Zhang, K.D.Hyde & Jian K.Liu (2024) – 1 sp.
- Surculiseries Okane, Nakagiri & Tad.Ito (2001) – 1 sp.
- Synnemadiella Crous & M.J.Wingf. (2016) – 1 sp.
- Tristratiperidium Daranag., Camporesi & K.D.Hyde (2015) – 1 sp.
- Xylocrea Möller (1901) – 1 sp.
- Yuea O.E.Erikss. (2003) – 1 sp.
