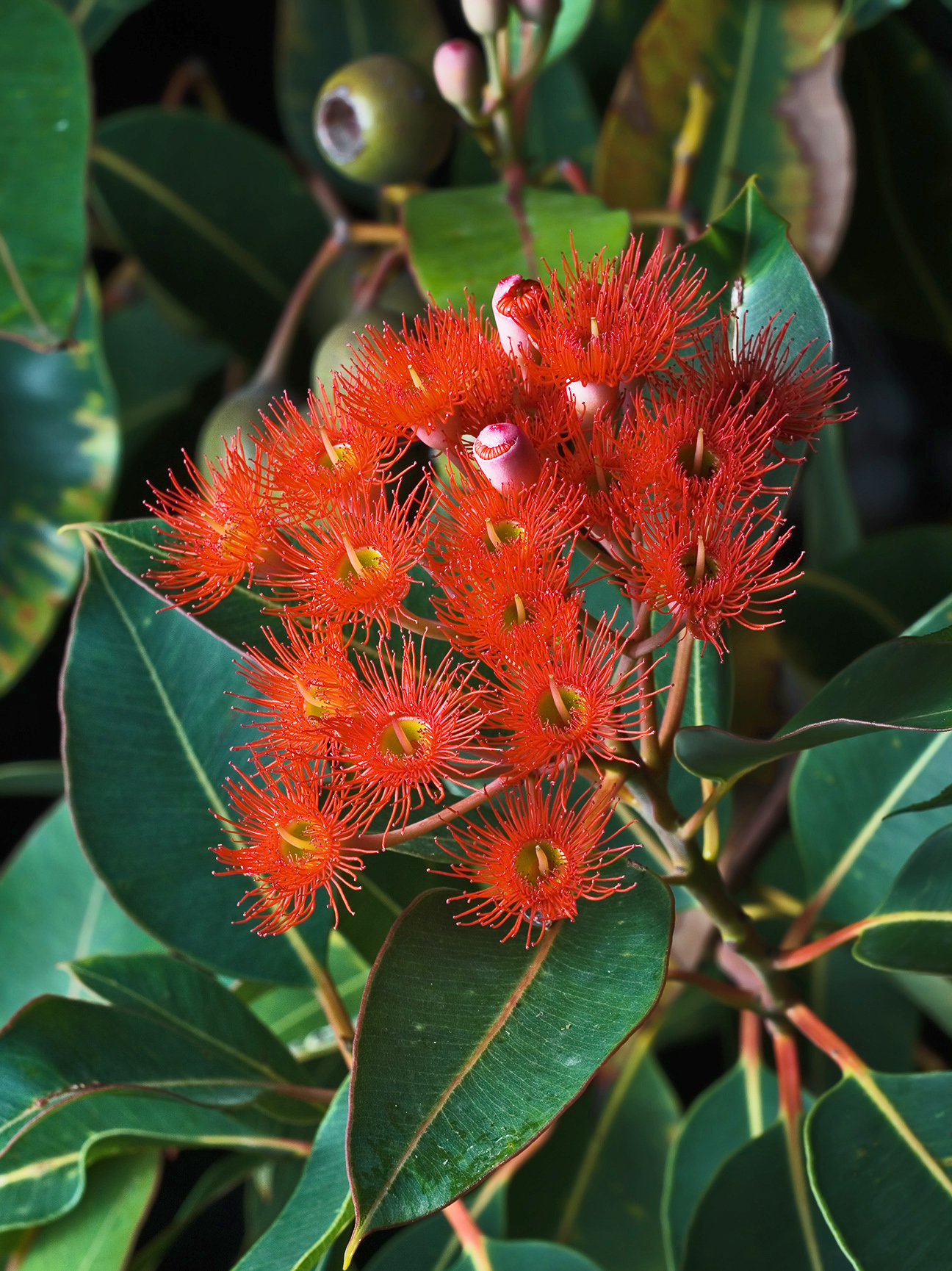
- Corymbia ficifolia near Austins Ferry

Scientific classification
- Kingdom: Plantae
- Clade: Tracheophytes
- Clade: Angiosperms
- Clade: Eudicots
- Clade: Rosids
- Order: Myrtales
- Family: Myrtaceae
- Subfamily: Myrtoideae
- Tribe: Eucalypteae
- Genus: Corymbia; K.D.Hill & L.A.S.Johnson

Type species
- Corymbia gummifera (Gaertn.) K.D. Hill & L.A.S. Johnson

Diversity
- about 113 species

= Corymbia =

Genus of trees

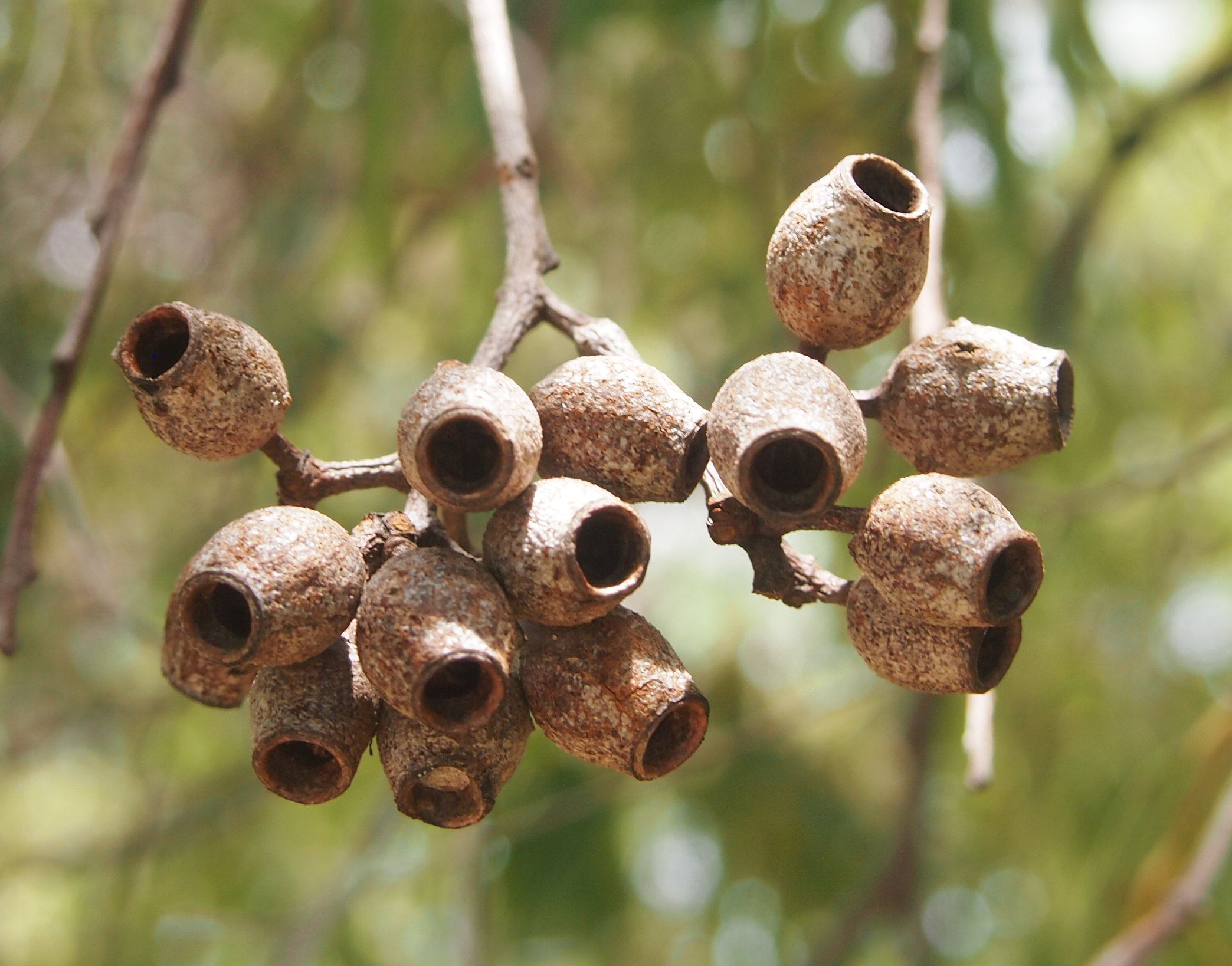
Fruit of Corymbia intermedia

Corymbia, commonly known as bloodwoods, is a genus of about one hundred species of tree that, along with Eucalyptus, Angophora and several smaller groups, are referred to as eucalypts. Until 1990, corymbias were included in the genus Eucalyptus and there is still considerable disagreement among botanists as to whether separating them is valid. As of January 2020, Corymbia is an accepted name at the Australian Plant Census.

== Description ==
Eucalypts in the genus Corymbia are trees, sometimes mallee-like, that either have rough, fibrous or flaky bark, or smooth bark that is shed in small flakes or short strips. Young plants and coppice regrowth have leaves that differ from adult leaves. The adult leaves are arranged alternately (strictly disjunct opposite, but appearing alternate), with oil glands. The flower buds are arranged in groups on a branching peduncle, each branch usually with seven buds, but with the pedicels of differing lengths, so that the inflorescence is flat-topped or convex. The anthers are joined to the filament at their mid-point and open by parallel slits. As in Eucalyptus, the five sepals are fused to form an outer calyptra (or operculum) and the five petals an inner calyptra, the two calyptra being shed separately or together as the flower opens. Also as in Eucalyptus the fruit is usually a woody capsule, but in this case the disc is always depressed and the valves are always enclosed.

== Taxonomy and naming ==
The genus Corymbia was first formally described in 1995 by Ken Hill and Lawrie Johnson in the journal Telopea. The type species is C. gummifera. The genus name, Corymbia is from the Latin word corymbus, meaning "a corymb".

The bloodwoods had been recognised as a distinct group within the large and diverse genus Eucalyptus since 1867. Molecular research in the 1990s, however, showed that they, along with the rest of the section Corymbia, are more closely related to Angophora than to Eucalyptus, and are now regarded as a separate genus by the Australian Plant Census. All three genera, Angophora, Corymbia and Eucalyptus, are closely related, and are generally referred to as "eucalypts".

Botanists Ken Hill and Lawrie Johnson were the first to define the genus Corymbia in 1995, identifying the bloodwoods, ghost gums and spotted gums as a group distinct from Eucalyptus.

Since 1995, there have been ongoing investigations into the relationships between the genera. Genetic analysis of ETS and ITS sequences of DNA in 2006 by Carlos Parra-O and colleagues of 67 taxa (47 of which were within Corymbia) yielded Corymbia and Angophora as each other's closest relatives, with the genus Eucalyptus as an earlier offshoot. The small genera Eucalyptopsis, Stockwellia and Allosyncarpia formed a clade which arose earlier still. In 2009, Parra-O and colleagues added more taxa and published a combined analysis of nuclear rDNA (ETS + ITS) and morphological characters published to clarify relationships within the genus. This confirmed two main clades, which they defined as the subgenera Corymbia and Blakella.

== Distribution ==
Species of Corymbia occur in all mainland states of Australia and in the Northern Territory. There are about 100 species, all endemic to Australia except for four species that also occur in New Guinea, and one that is endemic to that island.

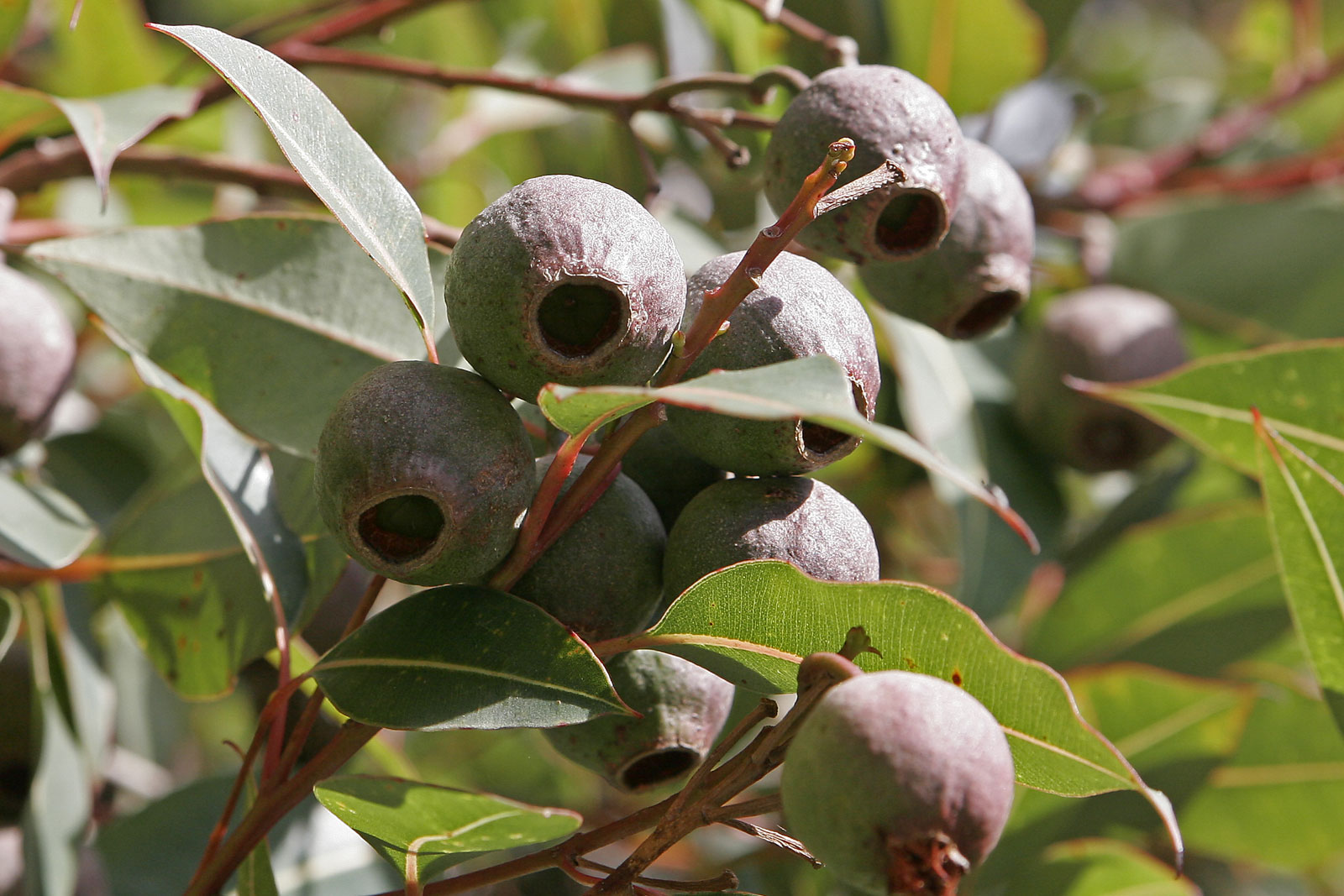
Corymbia, capsules (fruit)

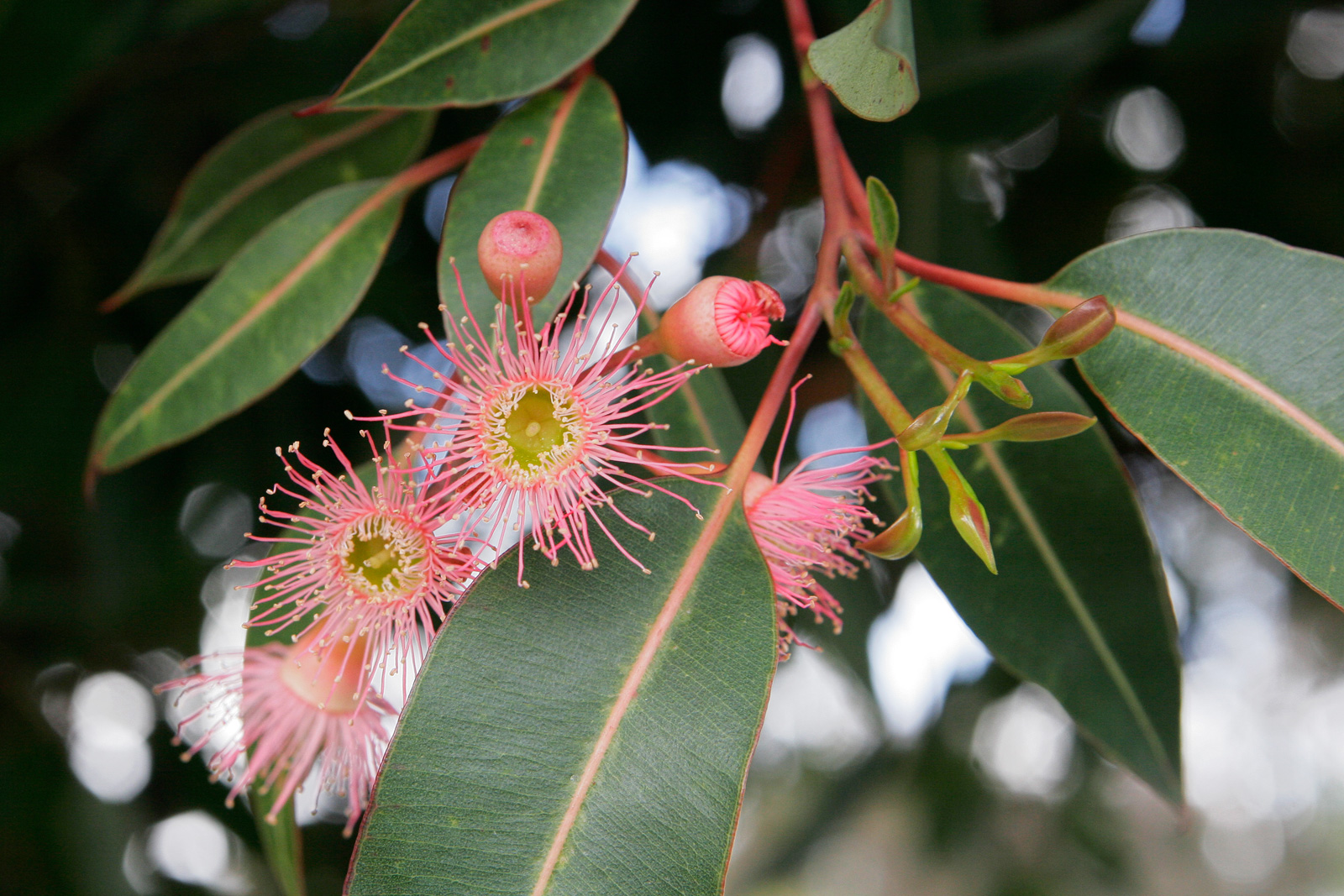
Corymbia flowers

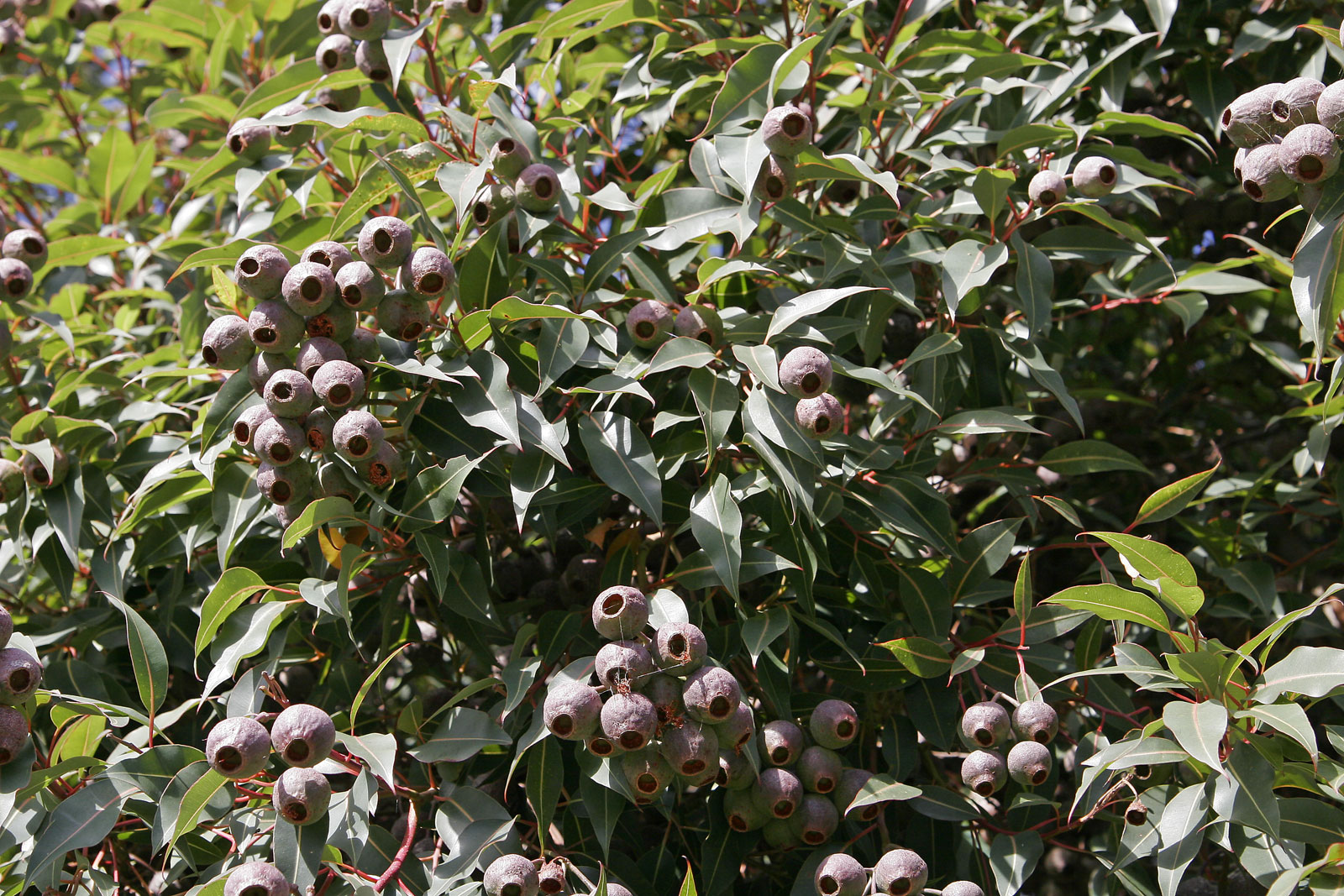
Corymbia capsules (fruit)
