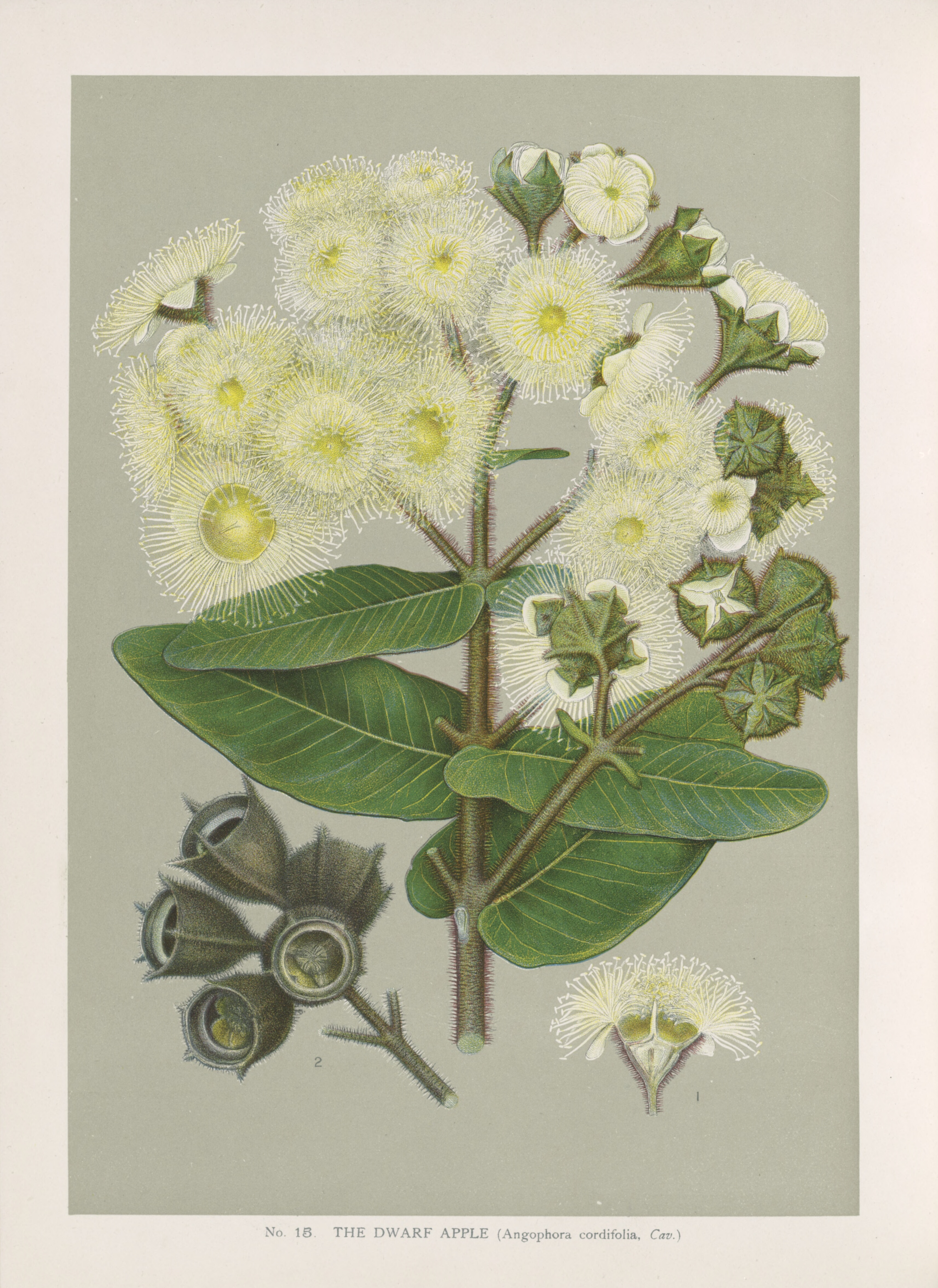
- Angophora hispida

Scientific classification
- Kingdom: Plantae
- Clade: Tracheophytes
- Clade: Angiosperms
- Clade: Eudicots
- Clade: Rosids
- Order: Myrtales
- Family: Myrtaceae
- Subfamily: Myrtoideae
- Tribe: Eucalypteae

Genera
- 7, see text

= Eucalypteae =

Tribe of flowering plants

Eucalypteae is a large tribe of woody flowering plants with capsule fruiting bodies in the family Myrtaceae; members of this tribe are known as eucalypts. In Australia the genera Angophora, Corymbia, and Eucalyptus are commonly known as gum trees, for the sticky substance that exudes from the trunk of some species, or stringybarks. As of 2020, the tribe comprised around 860 species, all native to Southeast Asia and Oceania, with a main diversity center in Australia.

== Genera ==
There are seven genera in the tribe Eucalypteae:

- Allosyncarpia S.T.Blake – Australia
- Angophora Cav. – Australia
- Arillastrum Pancher ex Baill. – New Caledonia
- Corymbia K.D.Hill & L.A.S.Johnson – Oceania
- Eucalyptopsis C.T.White – Indonesia, New Guinea
- Eucalyptus L'Hér. – Southeast Asia, Oceania
- Stockwellia D.J.Carr, S.G.M.Carr & B.Hyland – Australia

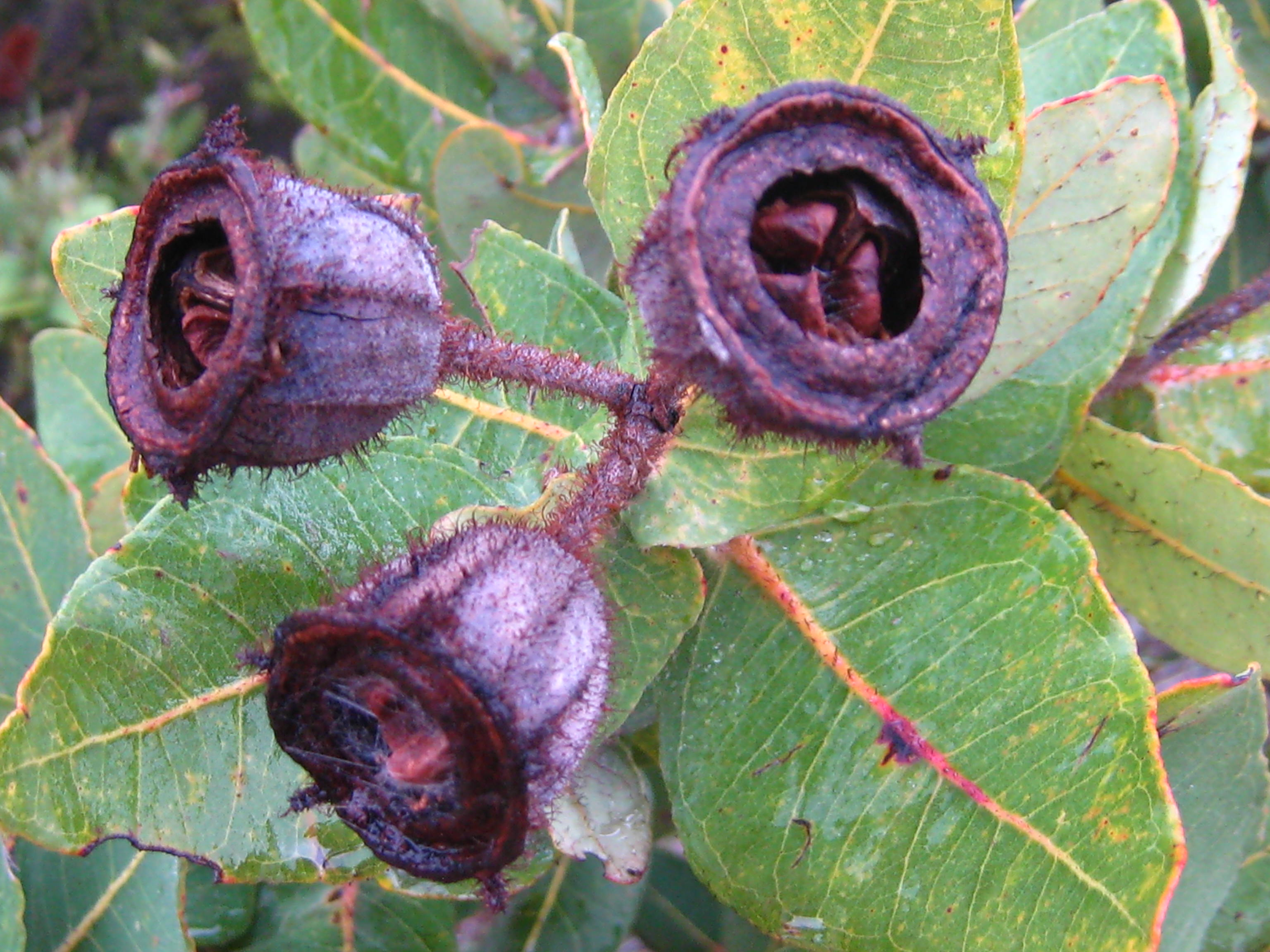
Dwarf apple gumnuts

== Taxonomy ==
For an example of changing historical perspectives, in 1991, largely genetic evidence indicated that some prominent Eucalyptus species were actually more closely related to Angophora than to other eucalypts; they were accordingly split off into the new genus Corymbia.

Although separate, all of these genera and their species are allied and it remains the standard to refer to the members of all seven genera Angophora, Corymbia, Eucalyptus, Stockwellia, Allosyncarpia, Eucalyptopsis and Arillastrum as "eucalypts" or as the eucalypt group.

The extant genera Stockwellia, Allosyncarpia, Eucalyptopsis and Arillastrum comprise six known species, restricted to monsoon forests and rainforests in north-eastern Australia, the Arnhem Land plateau, New Guinea, the Moluccas and New Caledonia. These genera are recognised as having evolved from ancient lineages of the family Myrtaceae. According to genetic, fossil and morphological evidence, it is hypothesised that they evolved into separate taxa before the evolution of the more widespread and well-known genera Eucalyptus, Corymbia and Angophora, and all of their many species.

Eucalyptus deglupta has naturally spread the furthest from the Australian geographic origin of the genus Eucalyptus, being the only species known growing naturally in the nearby northern hemisphere, from New Guinea to New Britain, Sulawesi, Seram Island to Mindanao, Philippines. Eucalyptus urophylla also grows naturally as far west as the Flores and Timor islands.

== Adaptations ==
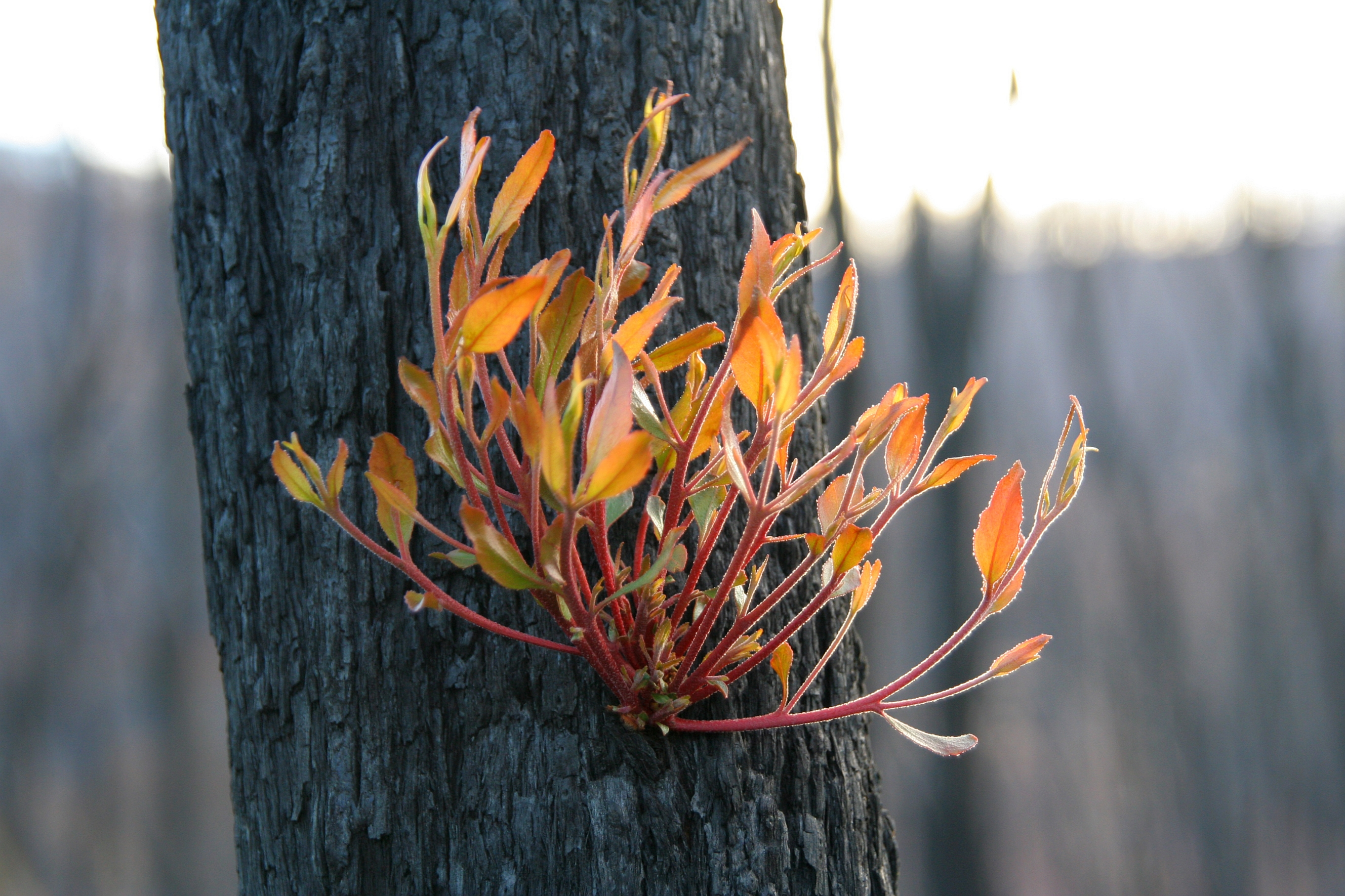
Epicormic regrowth from eucalypt bark, four months after Black Saturday bushfires, Strathewen, Victoria

Eucalypts from fire-prone habitats are attuned to withstand fire in several ways:

- Their seeds are often held in an insulated capsule, which opens only after a bushfire. Once cooled down, the land becomes a freshly fertilised seed bed.
- Oils in the leaves tend to make the fire more severe and therefore more damaging to less attuned species, giving an evolutionary advantage to the eucalypts.

Epicormic buds under the often thick bark of the trunk and branches are ready to sprout new stems and leaves after a fire.

These advantages work well in areas affected by long dry spells.

Over 700 eucalypt species dominate landscapes all over Australia, but diversity is reduced in rainforests and arid environments.

A fungal plant pathogen (from the family Sporocadaceae), Allelochaeta brevilata (H.J. Swart & D.A. Griffiths) Crous is found on species of eucalypts in Australia.

== Gallery ==
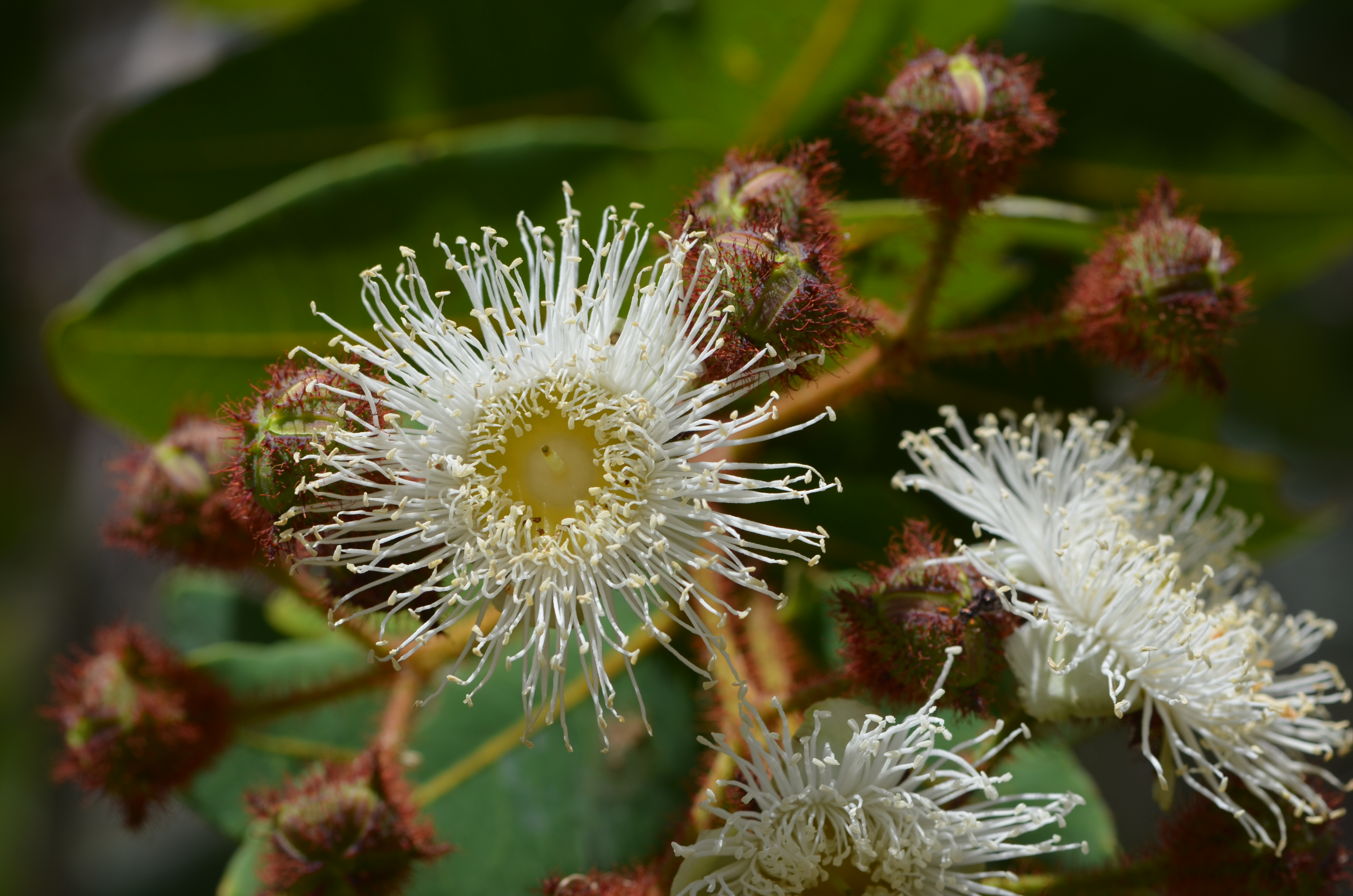
Angophora hispida

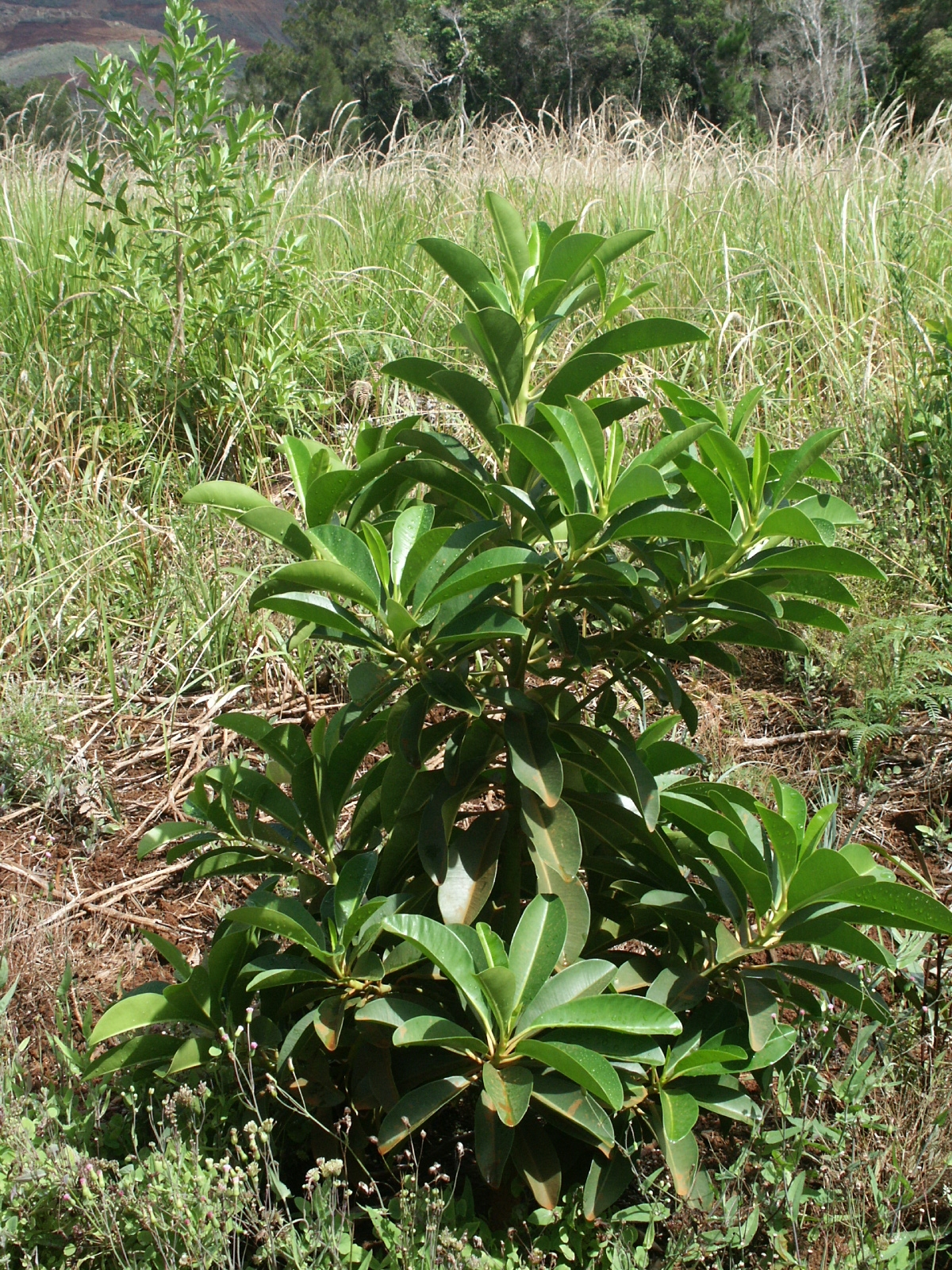
Arillastrum gummiferum

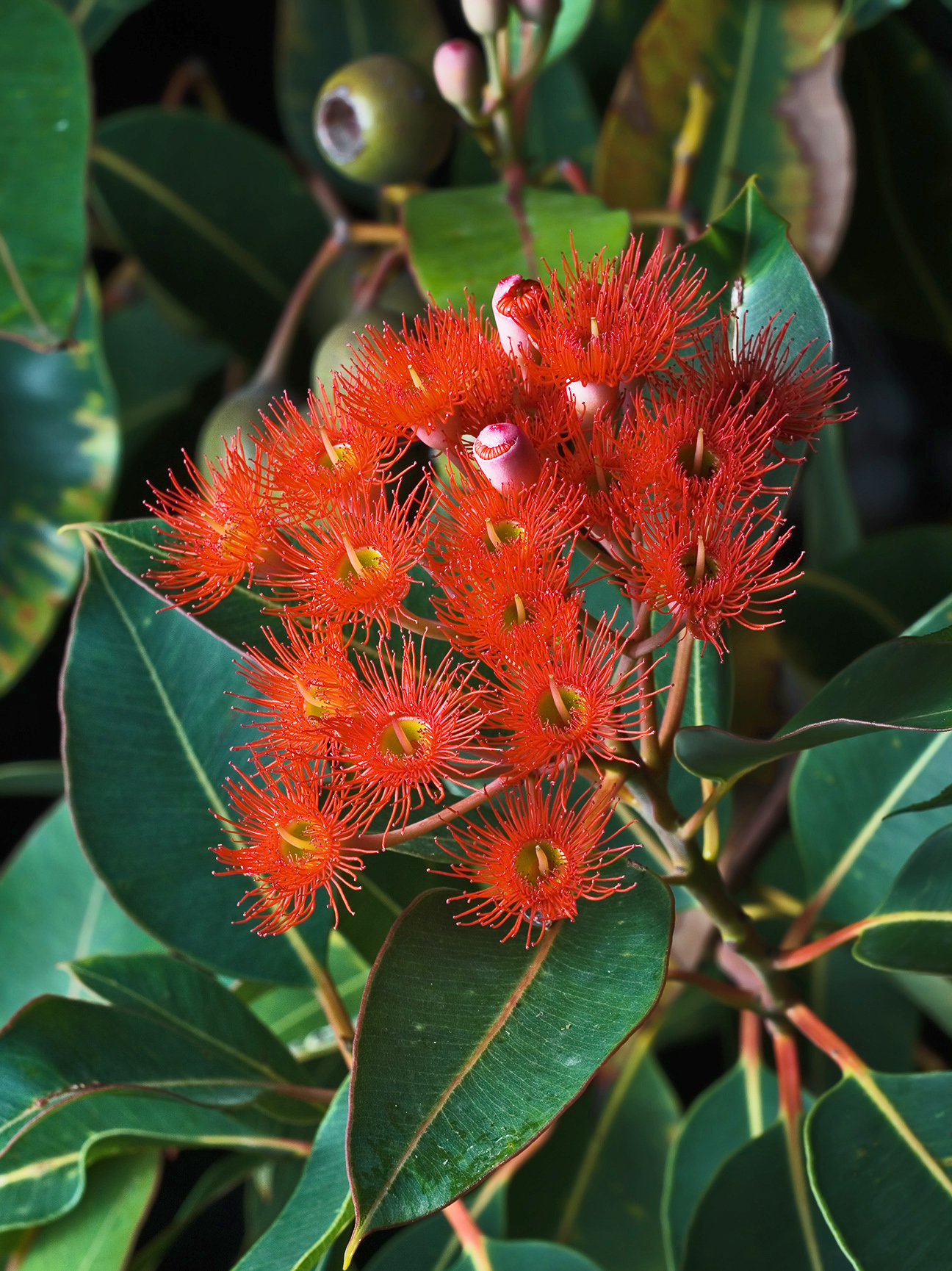
Corymbia ficifolia

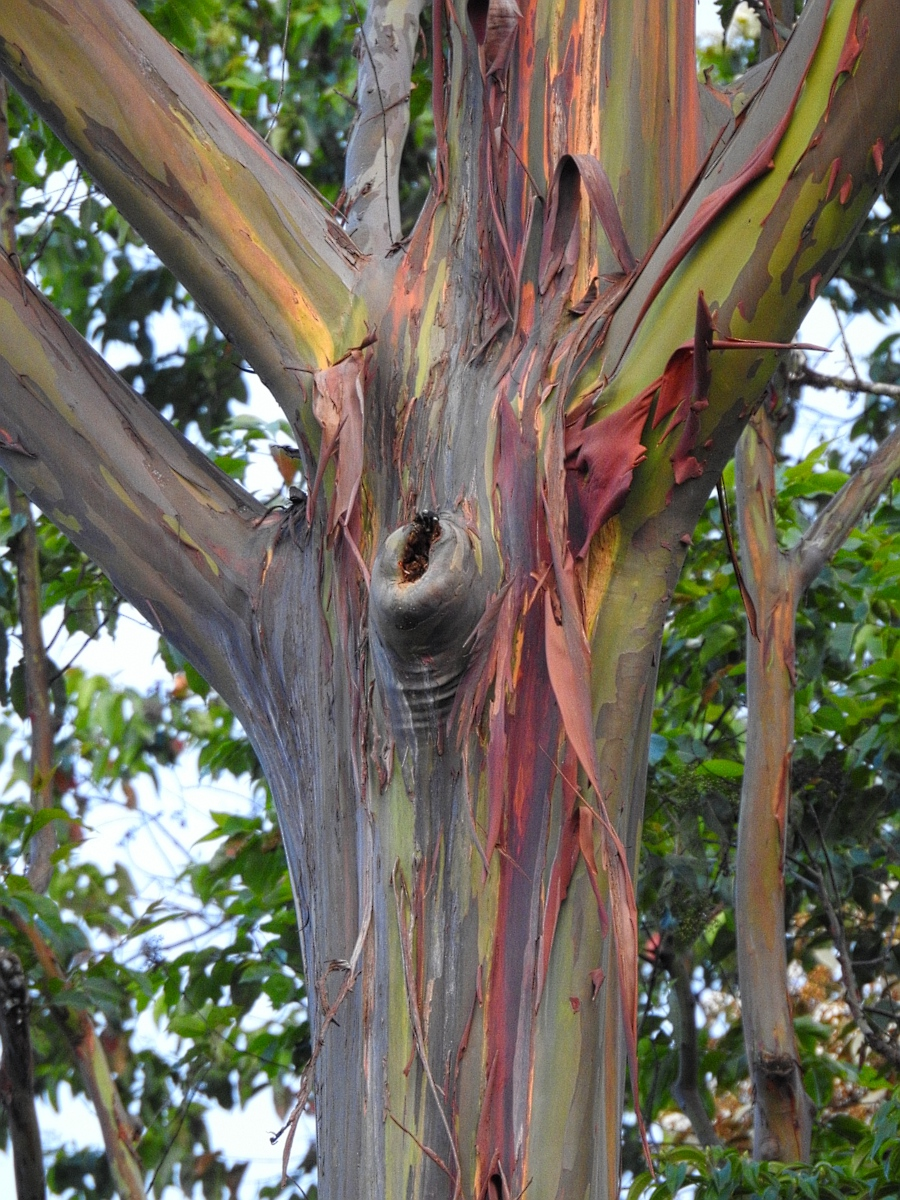
Eucalyptus deglupta

== See also ==
- Orthorhinus cylindrirostris
