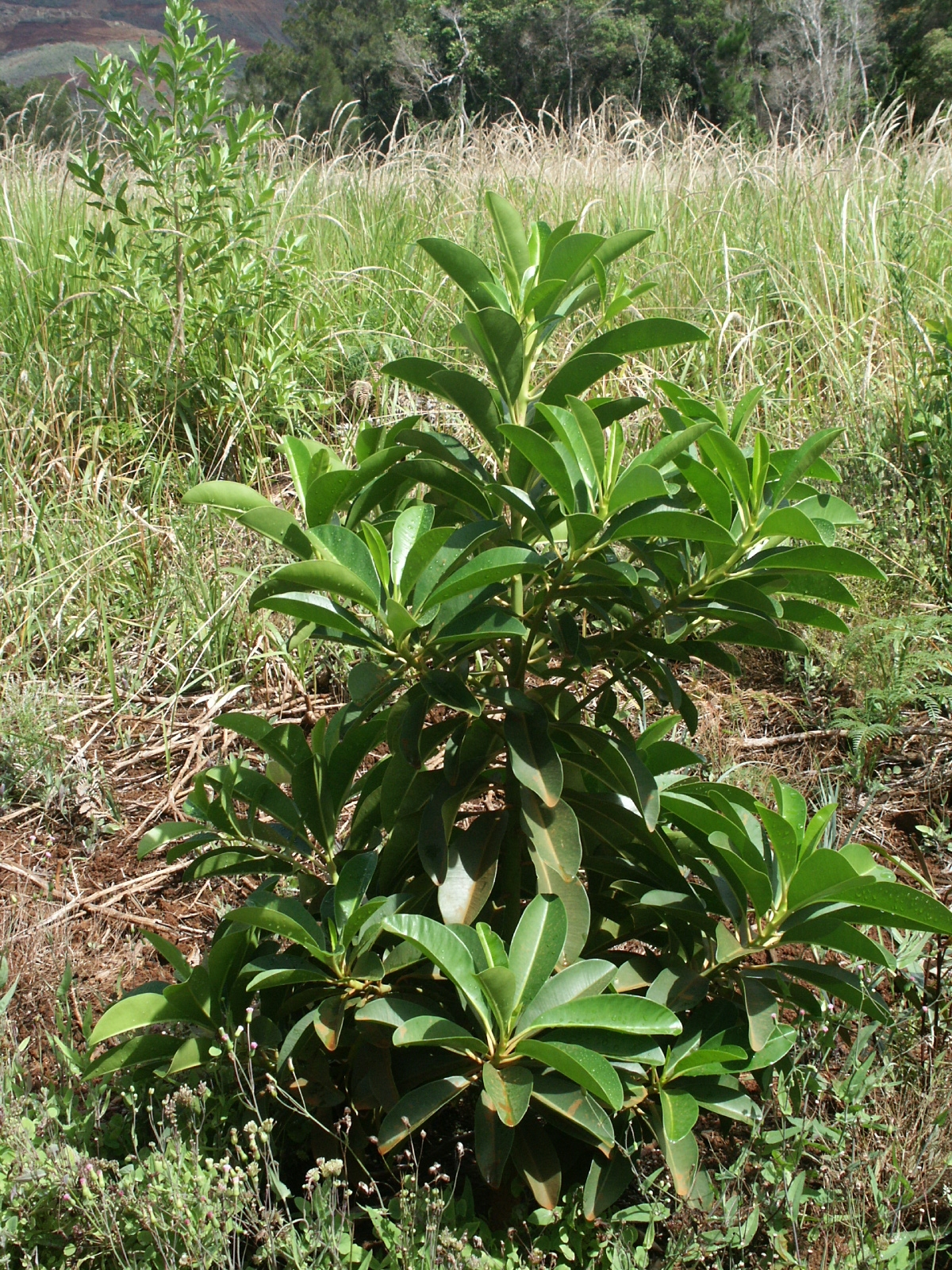

Conservation status
- Vulnerable (IUCN 3.1)

Scientific classification
- Kingdom: Plantae
- Clade: Tracheophytes
- Clade: Angiosperms
- Clade: Eudicots
- Clade: Rosids
- Order: Myrtales
- Family: Myrtaceae
- Subfamily: Myrtoideae
- Tribe: Eucalypteae
- Genus: Arillastrum; Pancher ex Baill.
- Species: A. gummiferum

Binomial name
- Arillastrum gummiferum (Brongn. & Gris) Pancher ex Baill.

= Arillastrum =

Genus of flowering plants

Arillastrum is a monotypic genus of trees in the myrtle family, Myrtaceae, containing the single species Arillastrum gummiferum. It is endemic to southern New Caledonia. It is related to Eucalyptus, but more closely to Angophora and Corymbia.

It is a tree up to 35 meters tall with a trunk over a meter wide. It might flower only every seven years. The flowers each have four clusters of stamens and staminodes.

This species grows on ultramafic rock substrates. It grows in stands with other individuals of its species. One species associated with this tree is Podoserpula miranda, commonly known as Barbie pagoda. This is a rare fungi species that grows at the base of these trees and is thought to be parasitic.

The species has been called "one of New Caledonia's most economically and ecologically significant trees". It has been heavily exploited for its strong, dark red, resinous wood, which is useful for the construction of buildings, bridges, boats, and telephone poles. Its populations have been significantly reduced by logging.
