= Eucalyptopsis =

Scientific classification
- Kingdom: Plantae
- Clade: Tracheophytes
- Clade: Angiosperms
- Clade: Eudicots
- Clade: Rosids
- Order: Myrtales
- Family: Myrtaceae
- Subfamily: Myrtoideae
- Tribe: Eucalypteae
- Genus: Eucalyptopsis; C.T.White

Species
- See text

Genus of flowering plants

Eucalyptopsis is a genus of two species of trees in the Eucalypteae tribe of the family Myrtaceae. They are native to New Guinea and the Moluccas, and their closest relatives are the species Stockwellia quadrifida and Allosyncarpia ternata, both of which are the sole species in their respective genera.

== Species ==
- Eucalyptopsis alauda Craven – New Guinea incl. Woodlark Island

Synonym: Eucalyptopsis sp. aff. papuana C.T.White (1951)

- Eucalyptopsis papuana C.T.White – New Guinea, Moluccas
