= Eucalyptopsis papuana =

Conservation status
- Near Threatened (IUCN 3.1)

Scientific classification
- Kingdom: Plantae
- Clade: Tracheophytes
- Clade: Angiosperms
- Clade: Eudicots
- Clade: Rosids
- Order: Myrtales
- Family: Myrtaceae
- Genus: Eucalyptopsis
- Species: E. papuana

Binomial name
- Eucalyptopsis papuana C.T.White

Species of tree

Eucalyptopsis papuana is a species of flowering plant in the family Myrtaceae. It is a tree native to the Maluku and New Guinea. It is threatened by habitat loss.
