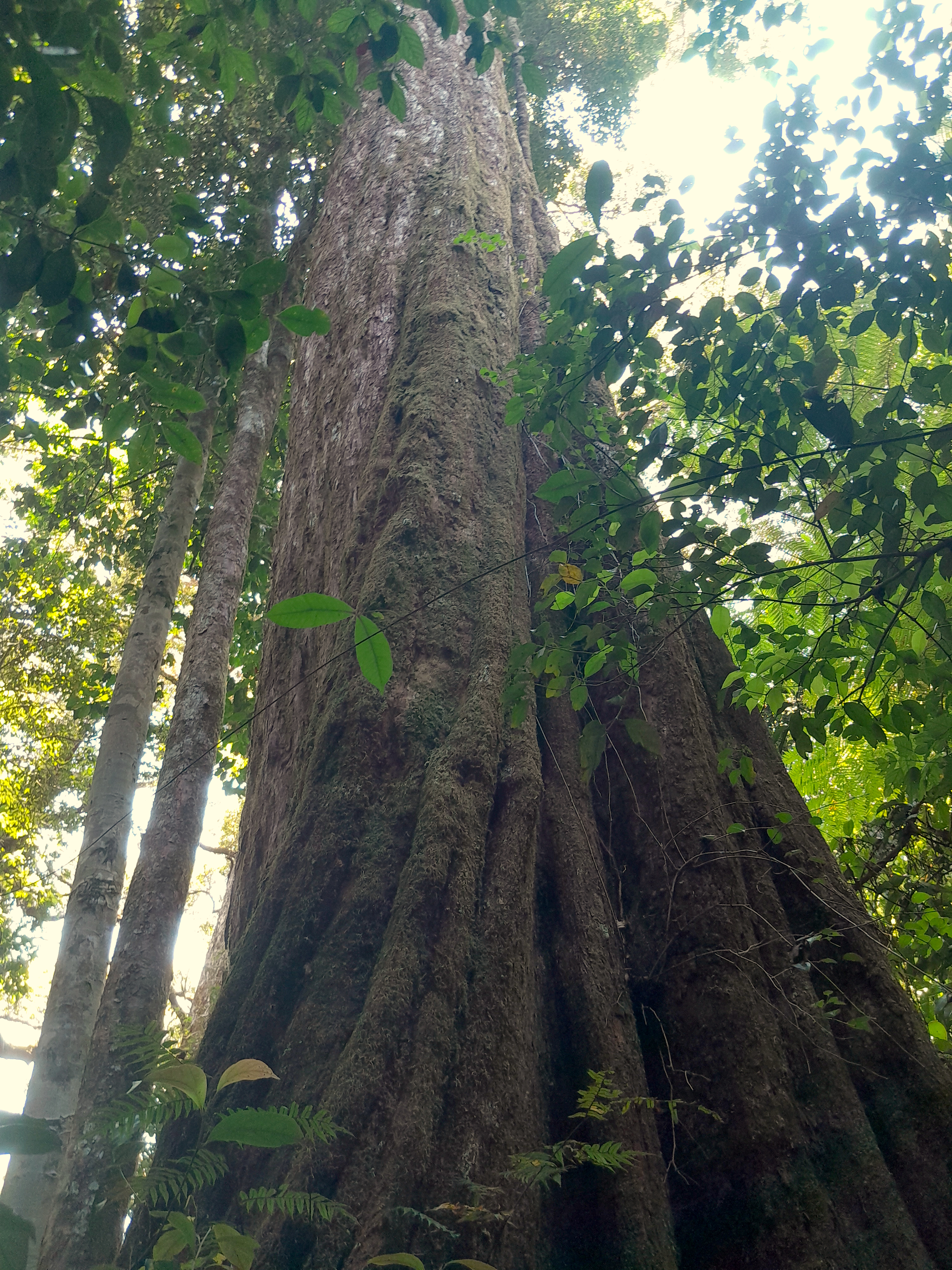

Conservation status
- Vulnerable (NCA)

Scientific classification
- Kingdom: Plantae
- Clade: Tracheophytes
- Clade: Angiosperms
- Clade: Eudicots
- Clade: Rosids
- Order: Myrtales
- Family: Myrtaceae
- Subfamily: Myrtoideae
- Tribe: Eucalypteae
- Genus: Stockwellia; D.J.Carr, S.G.M.Carr & B.Hyland, et al.
- Species: S. quadrifida

Binomial name
- Stockwellia quadrifida D.J.Carr, S.G.M.Carr & B.Hyland
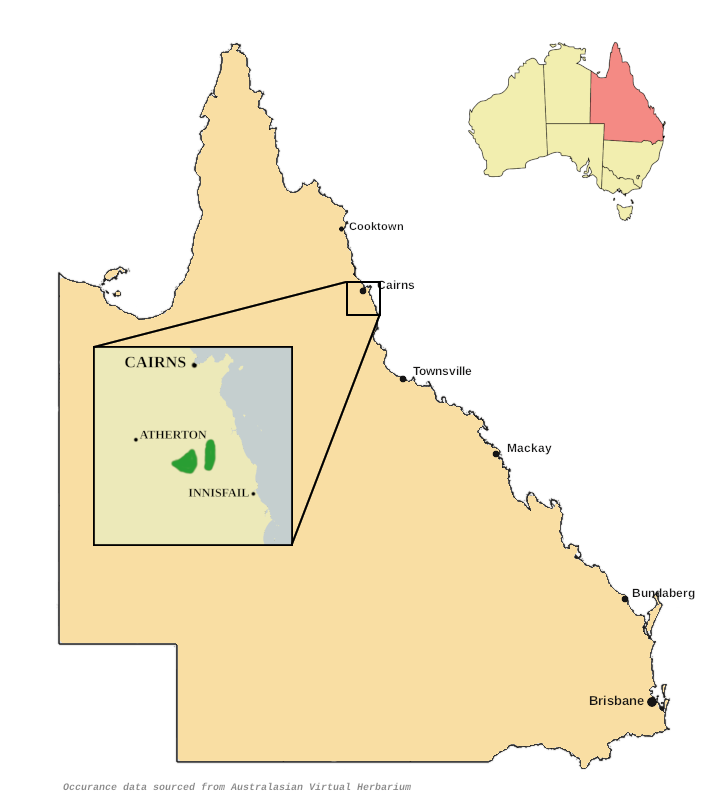

Synonyms
- Myrtaceae Gen. nov. sp. (Boonjie BH 6589)

= Stockwellia =

Vic Stockwell's puzzle

Genus of trees endemic to Queensland

Stockwellia is a monotypic genus in the flowering plant family Myrtaceae. The sole species in the genus, Stockwellia quadrifida (commonly known as Vic Stockwell's puzzle), is endemic to Queensland.

== Description ==
Stockwellia quadrifida is a very large rainforest emergent, growing up to 40 m (130 ft) tall and 2 m (6 ft 7 in) DBH. It has straight boles with reddish-brown flaky bark and buttress roots up to 6 m (20 ft) high.

The leaves are opposite to sub-opposite, glabrous, elliptic and leathery, measuring up to 12 cm (4.7 in) long by 4 cm (1.6 in) wide and turning red before falling.

Inflorescences are axillary, produced in groups of three sessile flowers on a peduncle measuring 10 to 25 mm (0.4 to 1.0 in) in length. The fruits are a fused woody capsule containing oval-shaped seeds measuring up to 11 by 6.5 mm (0.4 by 0.3 in).

=== Discovery ===
This species first became known to botanical science in 1971, when Atherton resident Keith Gould began experimenting with aerial photography as a means of forestry interpretation. Some of his photos appeared to show a large group of emergent trees in a small patch of rainforest near Topaz, and he referred them to Victor (Vic) Stockwell who was Queensland Forestry's ranger responsible for managing timber harvesting in that area. Despite Stockwell's vast experience in forestry he was unable to identify the trees from the photos, and so the two men ventured on foot into the forest to find them. When they encountered the trees, Stockwell realised that this was a species unknown both to himself and to botany in general.

Stockwell was surprised to discover a tree (especially a tree so massive, and growing close to forestry roads) of which he was unaware. It quickly aroused interest in botanical circles and became known colloquially as "Vic Stockwell's Puzzle", and was even mentioned in a scientific paper as Stockwellia long before a formal description and name was published.

== Distribution and habitat ==
This species is endemic to a very small part of the luxuriant Wet Tropics rainforests of north-eastern Queensland, specifically an area on the western slopes of Mount Bartle Frere where it is found only in well-developed rainforest. It occurs within an altitude range of about 500–750 m (1,600–2,500 ft). The area of occupancy of this species is just 52 km^{2} (20 sq mi). (Note: For a definition of Area of Occupancy see this page at the Atlas of Living Australia)

== Taxonomy ==
The genus Stockwellia and the species S. quadrifida were first formally described in 2002, some thirty years after its discovery. The Australian botanists Denis John Carr, Maisie Carr and Bernard Hyland published their collaboration in the Botanical Journal of the Linnean Society, based on material collected by Hyland.

=== Phylogeny ===
Genetic studies have shown that Stockwellia belongs in the "Eucalyptopsis alliance" (along with the genera Eucalyptopsis and Allosyncarpa) and that Allosyncarpa is basal to this group while the other two are sister taxa. The closest relatives, therefore, are Eucalyptopsis alauda and Eucalyptopsis papuana (both from New Guinea and the only two species in the genus), and Allosyncarpia ternata (another monotypic genus) from the Northern Territory.

=== Etymology ===
The genus name is in honour of Vic Stockwell, being the first to identify the plant as an unknown species. The species epithet quadrifida is derived from the Latin quattuor (four), and -fidus (divided), referring to the four segments of the hypanthium.

== Conservation status ==
This species is listed by the Queensland Department of Environment and Science as vulnerable. As of 2 November 2023, it has not been assessed by the IUCN.

In the 2002 paper that formally describes S. quadrifida, the authors stated that despite its restricted range the only threat to the species is predation of the seeds by sulphur-crested cockatoos (Cacatua galerita). However a new threat has recently appeared that may be of concern. The Australian botanist Andrew Thornhill wrote in an informal (i.e. not peer reviewed) article in The Conversation that he and fellow botanist Stuart Worboys recently (Note: Thornhill wrote: "More than a decade after the species was officially named...", i.e. later than 2012) visited these trees, at which time Worboys observed evidence of the fungus myrtle rust on the leaves. Thornhill wrote:

The Australian Myrtaceae have had no time to adapt to myrtle rust. What is happening now could cause the extinction of some extremely unique Australian plants – including Stockwellia.

suggesting that the status of this newly discovered species may change in the future.

== Ecology ==
The seeds are eaten by sulphur-crested cockatoos.

== Gallery ==
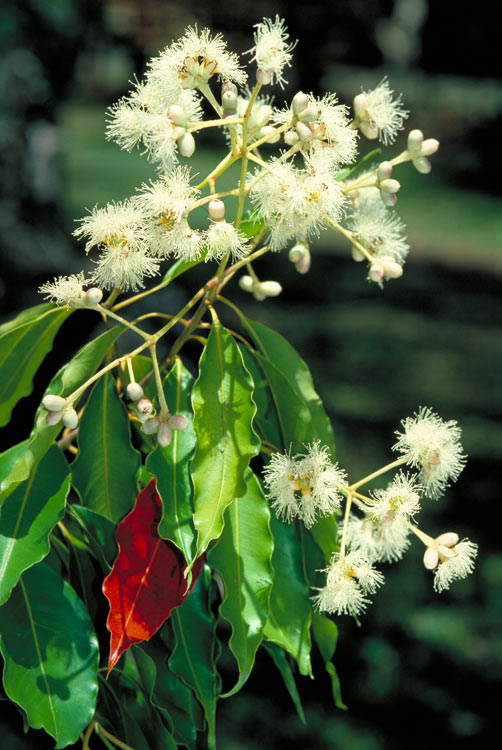
Inflorescence

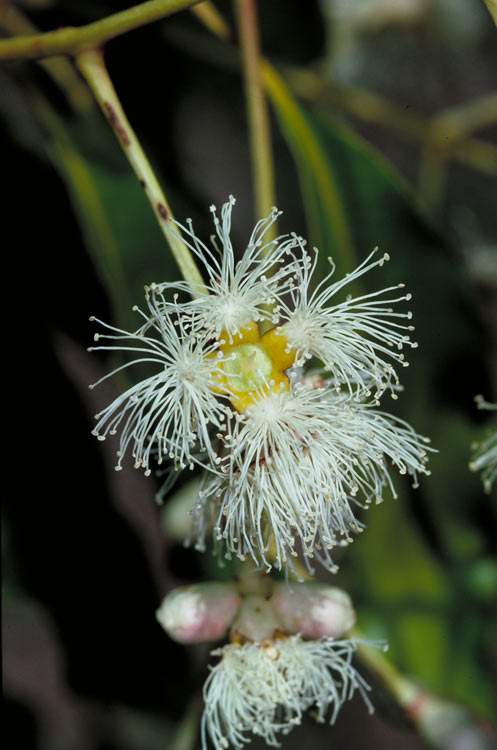
Flower

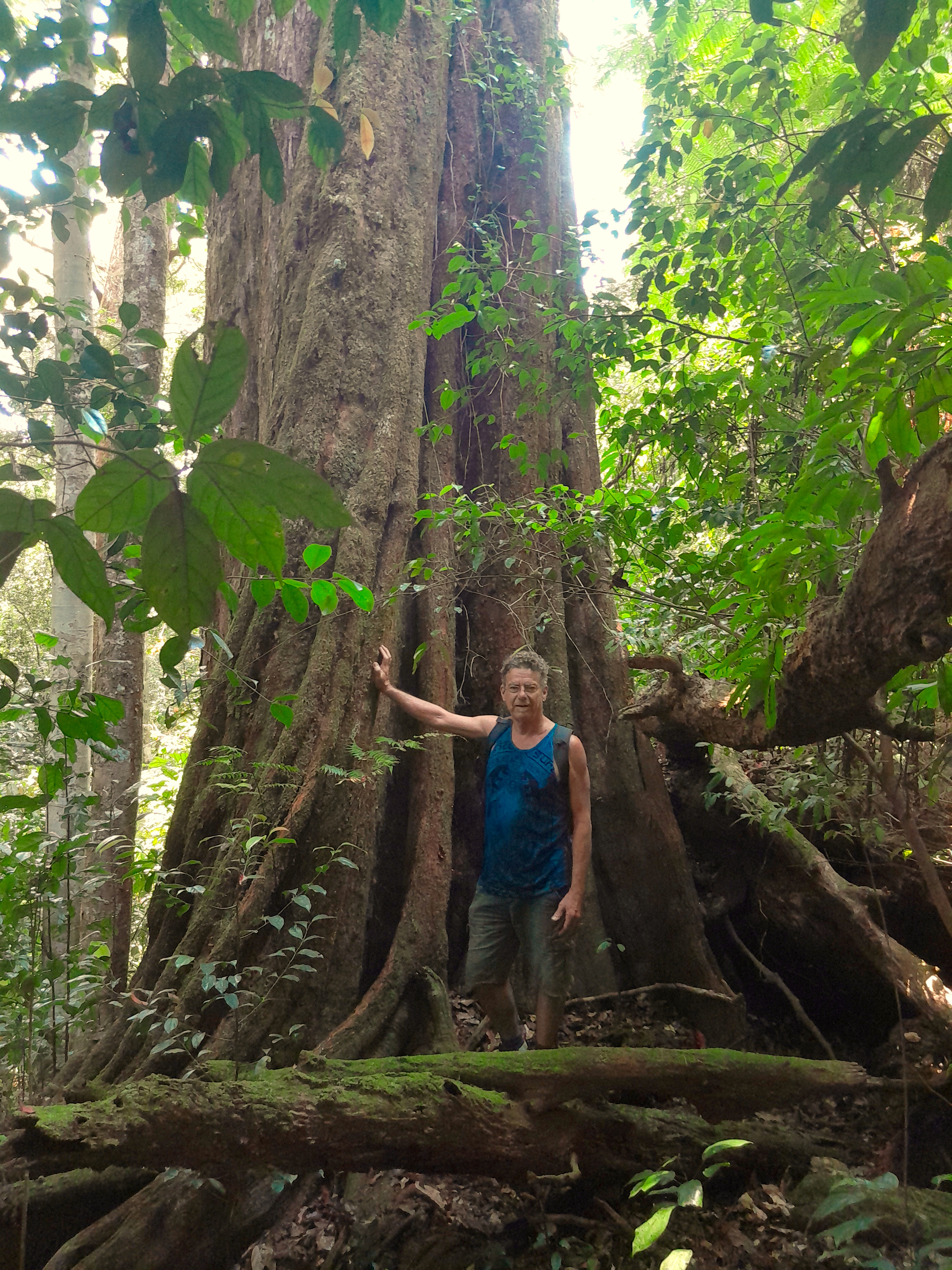
Base of tree

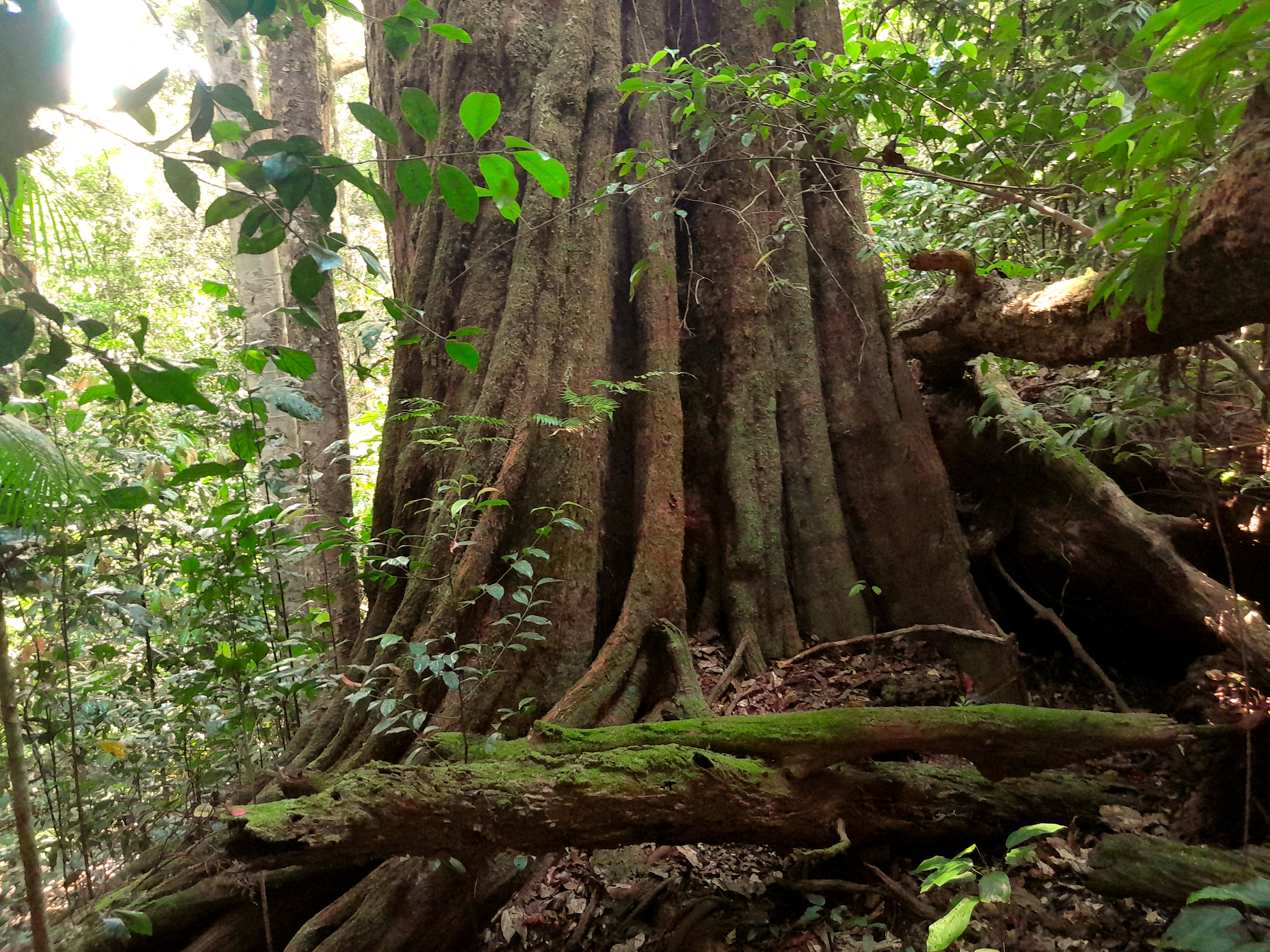
Trunk with buttresses

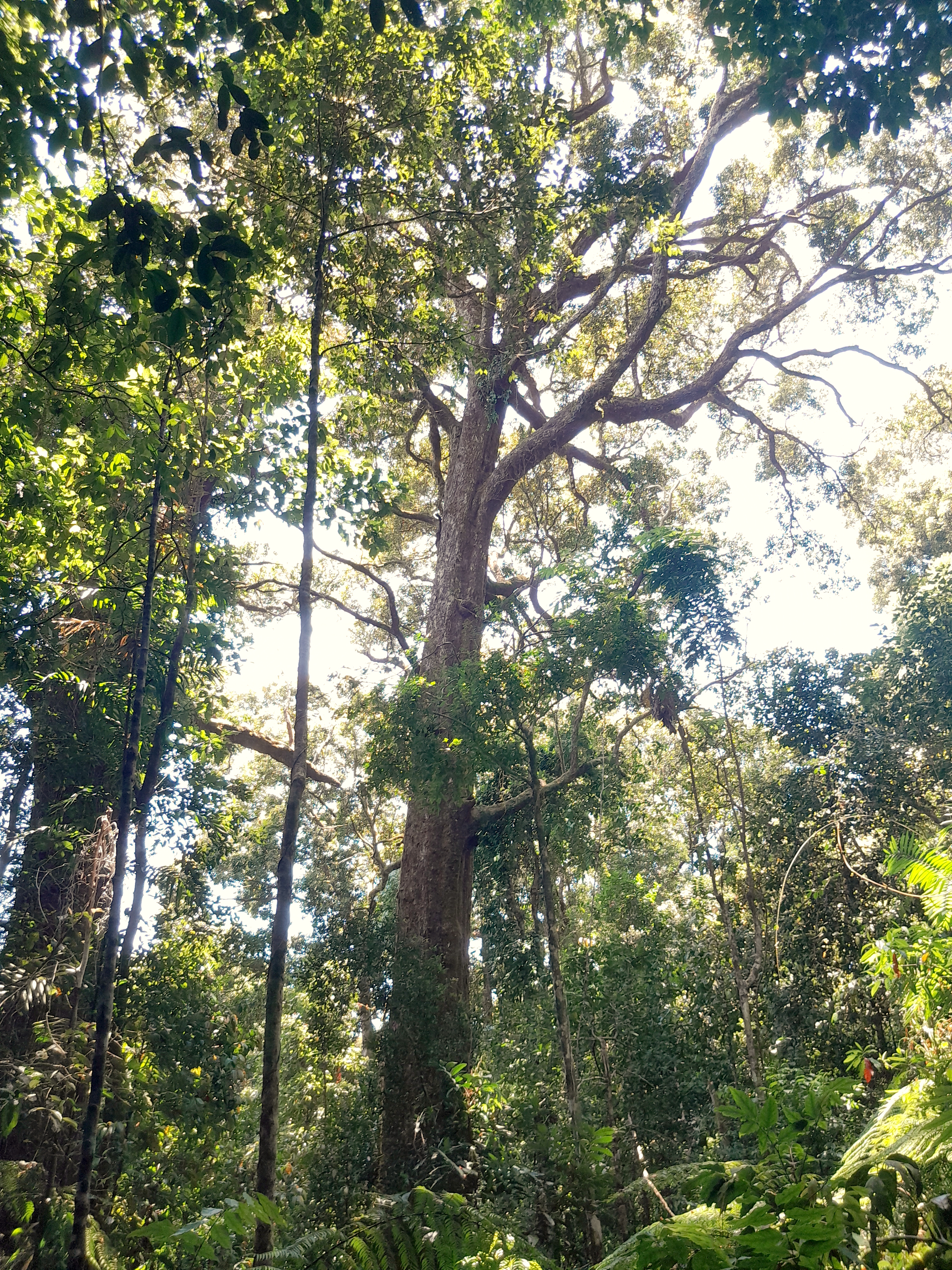
Trunk and canopy
