= Allelochaeta =

Scientific classification
- Kingdom: Fungi
- Division: Ascomycota
- Class: Sordariomycetes
- Order: Amphisphaeriales
- Family: Sporocadaceae
- Genus: Allelochaeta; Petr. (1955)

Synonyms
- Diploceras; Vermisporium

Genus of fungi

Allelochaeta is a genus of plant pathogens in the family Sporocadaceae.

It was published by Franz Petrak in Sydowia vol.9 (1–6) on page 464 in 1955.

Allelochaeta was considered as a synonym of Diploceras, one of the five groups of fungi into which the Seimatosporium complex was split by Nag Raj (in 1993). Based on a multi-gene phylogenetic study using the type species, Crous et al. (2018a), resurrected the genus Allelochaeta. Members of this genus are characterized by mostly 3-septate, hyaline or pigmented, concolorous or versicolorous conidia, having branched or solitary, cellular or continuous appendages (Crous et al. 2018a). Crous et al. (2018a) discussed the conidial septation, appendage types and pigmentation loss and gain during the evolution of Allelochaeta species.

== History ==
Then in 1977, it was thought to be a synonym of Seimatosporium (another fungi in the Sporocadaceae family) in Mycol. Pap. 141 Then in 1978, the fungal generic names of Allelochaeta, Basilocula, Ceuthosira, Pycnidiochaeta, and Xenodomus were found to be redundant. Allelochaeta and the single species of Allelochaeta gaubae was reduced to synonymy with Seimatosporium and Seimatosporium dilophosporum, respectively. Basilocula, Ceuthosira, and Xenodomus were then treated as synonyms of Coleophoma with species Coleophoma lauricola, Coleophoma aesculi, and Coleophoma taxi proposed as new combinations. The names Microgloeum and Microgloeum pruni were shown to be applicable to a microconidial state associated with Cylindrosporium padi. The generic name Neobarclaya is revived to accommodate Neobarclaya primaria and was segregated from Polynema in which Polynema ornatum and Polynema radiatum comb. nov. were then accepted. Pycnidiochaeta and its type species, Pycnidiochaeta biciliata, are reduced to synonymy with Dinemasporium and Dinemasporium gramineum, respectively.

In 2018, the appendaged coelomycete genus of Seimatosporium (Sporocadaceae, Sordariomycetes) and some of its purported synonyms Allelochaeta, Diploceras and Vermisporium are re-evaluated. Based on DNA data for five loci (ITS, LSU, rpb2, tub2 and tef1), Seimatosporium was found to be paraphyletic. The ex-type species of Allelochaeta, Discostromopsis and Vermisporium represent a distinct sister clade to which the oldest name Allelochaeta was then used. These genera were traditionally separated based on a combination of conidial pigmentation, septation (having a septum or dividing wall), and the nature of their conidial appendages. Allelochaeta was found to include taxa with both branched or solitary appendages, that could be cellular or continuous, with conidia being (2-)3(-5)-septate, hyaline, or pigmented, concolorous or versicolorous. These differences suggests that these characters should be applied at species, and not at the generic level. Conidial pigmentation appears to have been lost or gained several times during the evolution of species within Allelochaeta.

== Hosts ==
Allelochaeta brevilata (H.J. Swart & D.A. Griffiths) Crous is found on species of eucalypts in Australia.

== Distribution ==
It has a wide distribution, found in North America, Central America, Europe, South Africa, Australia, and New Zealand.

== Species ==
As accepted by Species Fungorum;

- Allelochaeta acuta (H.J. Swart & M.A. Will.) Crous (2018)
- Allelochaeta biseptata (H.J. Swart & M.A. Will.) Crous (2018)
- Allelochaeta brevicentra (H.J. Swart & M.A. Will.) Crous (2018)
- Allelochaeta brevilata (H.J. Swart & D.A. Griffiths) Crous (2019)
- Allelochaeta cylindrospora (H.J. Swart) Crous (2018)
- Allelochaeta dilophospora (Cooke) Crous (2018)
- Allelochaeta elegans (H.J. Swart) Crous (2018)
- Allelochaeta euabalongensis Crous (2018)
- Allelochaeta eucalypti (McAlpine) Crous (2018)
- Allelochaeta falcata (B. Sutton) Crous (2018)
- Allelochaeta flexuosa Crous (2018)
- Allelochaeta fusispora (H.J. Swart & D.A. Griffiths) Crous (2018)
- Allelochaeta gaubae Petr. (1955)
- Allelochaeta kriegeriana (Bres.) Crous (2018)
- Allelochaeta melaleucae Crous (2018)
- Allelochaeta minor Crous (2018)
- Allelochaeta neoacuta Crous (2018)
- Allelochaeta neocylindrospora Crous (2018)
- Allelochaeta neodilophospora Crous (2018)
- Allelochaeta neofalcata Crous (2018)
- Allelochaeta neoorbicularis Crous (2018)
- Allelochaeta neowalkeri Crous (2018)
- Allelochaeta obliquae Crous (2018)
- Allelochaeta obtusa (H.J. Swart & M.A. Will.) Crous (2018)
- Allelochaeta orbicularis (Cooke) Crous (2018)
- Allelochaeta paracylindrospora Crous (2018)
- Allelochaeta paraelegans Crous (2018)
- Allelochaeta parafalcata Crous (2018)
- Allelochaeta paraleptospermi Crous (2018)
- Allelochaeta paramelaleucae Crous (2018)
- Allelochaeta paraorbicularis Crous (2018)
- Allelochaeta polycarpae Crous (2018)
- Allelochaeta pseudoacuta Crous (2018)
- Allelochaeta pseudoelegans Crous (2018)
- Allelochaeta pseudofalcata Crous (2018)
- Allelochaeta pseudoobtusa Crous (2018)
- Allelochaeta pseudosamuelii Crous (2018)
- Allelochaeta pseudowalkeri Crous (2018)
- Allelochaeta samuelii (Hansf.) Crous (2018)
- Allelochaeta sparsifoliae Crous (2018)
- Allelochaeta verrucispora (Nag Raj) Crous (2018)
- Allelochaeta walkeri (H.J. Swart & M.A. Will.) Crous (2018)
