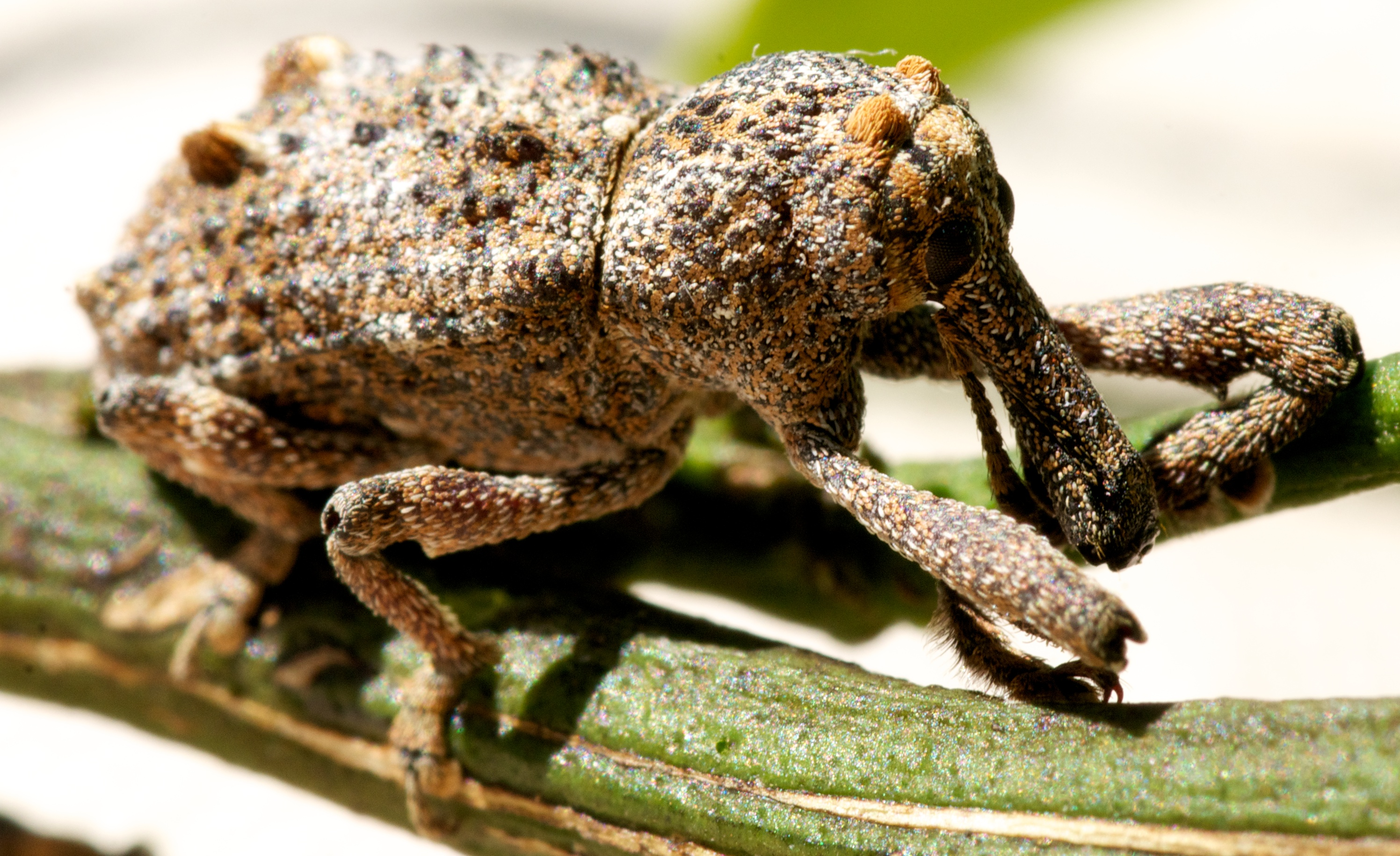

Scientific classification
- Kingdom: Animalia
- Phylum: Arthropoda
- Class: Insecta
- Order: Coleoptera
- Suborder: Polyphaga
- Infraorder: Cucujiformia
- Family: Curculionidae
- Genus: Orthorhinus
- Species: O. cylindrirostris

Binomial name
- Orthorhinus cylindrirostris Schönherr (1825)

= Orthorhinus cylindrirostris =

Species of beetle

Orthorhinus cylindrirostris, commonly known as the elephant weevil, is a species of Curculionidae. In Australia they are considered a major pest to wine companies.

== Description ==
Color and size are extremely variable with the adult size ranging between 10 and 20mm. Typically there is a tubercle on both sides of the pronotum, both elytron have two tubercles on the 2nd interstices. The 5th interstice has similar tubercle on posterior declivity. A male's antennae are much closer to the apex of the rostrum, they also have longer forelegs than females. The three basal tarsal segments are more expanded in the male than the female. Females are less cylindrical, more coarse and shorter than the males.

== Life cycle ==
The weevil and larvae both feed on various species of Eucalyptus.

== Gallery ==
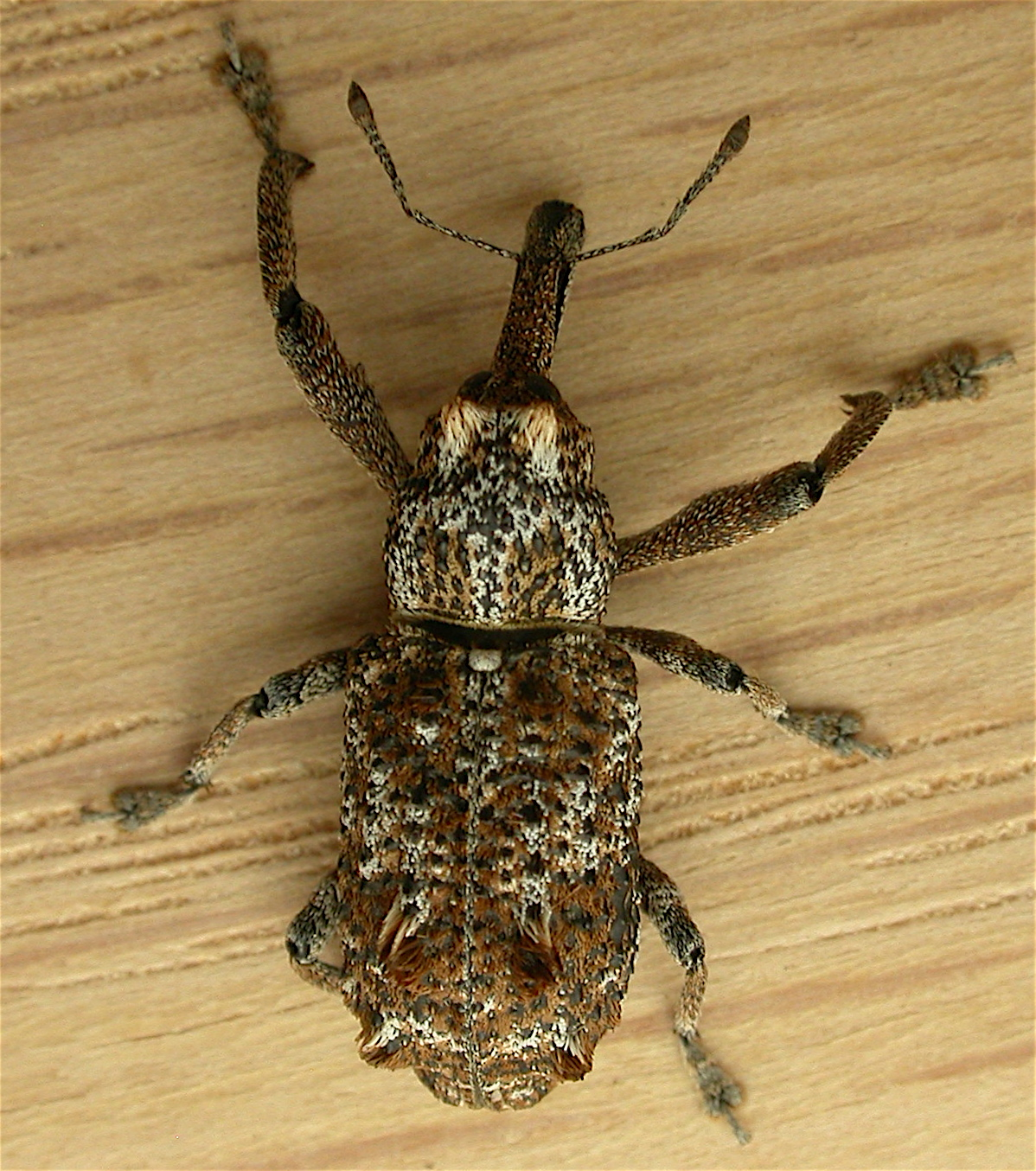
Female elephant weevil
