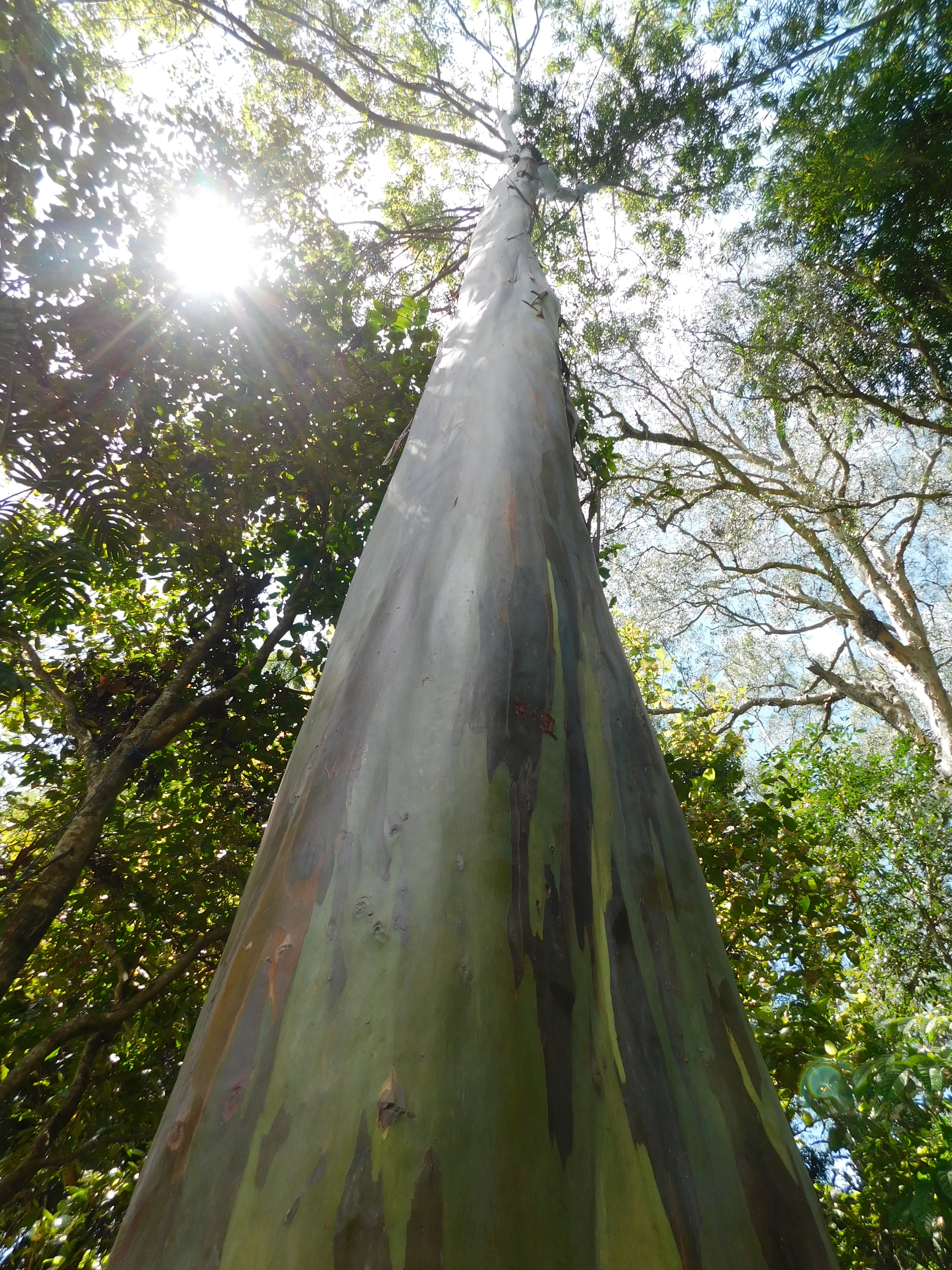
- Looking up from the trunk to treetop of a Eucalyptus deglupta

Conservation status
- Vulnerable (IUCN 3.1)

Scientific classification
- Kingdom: Plantae
- Clade: Tracheophytes
- Clade: Angiosperms
- Clade: Eudicots
- Clade: Rosids
- Order: Myrtales
- Family: Myrtaceae
- Genus: Eucalyptus
- Species: E. deglupta

Binomial name
- Eucalyptus deglupta Blume

Synonyms
- List: Eucalyptus multiflora Rich. ex A.Gray nom. illeg.; Eucalyptus naudiniana F.Muell.; Eucalyptus sarassa Blume; Eucalyptus schlechteri Diels; Eucalyptus versicolor Blume; Eugenia binacag Elmer

= Eucalyptus deglupta =

Rainbow eucalyptus

Species of eucalyptus

Eucalyptus deglupta, commonly known as the rainbow eucalyptus, Mindanao gum, or rainbow gum, is a species of tall tree native to the Philippines, Indonesia and Papua New Guinea. It is one of very few Eucalyptus species that usually occurs in rainforest, and with a natural range that extends into the Northern Hemisphere. It is noted for its multi-coloured bark.

== Description ==
Eucalyptus deglupta is a fast-growing tree that typically reaches a height of 60–78 m (197–256 ft), with the trunk up to 240 cm (94 in) in diameter and with buttresses up to 4 m (13 ft) high. It has smooth, orange-tinted bark that sheds in strips, revealing streaks of pale green, red, orange, grey, and purplish brown. The branchlets are roughly square in cross section, often with narrow wings on the corners. The leaves are arranged in opposite pairs, mostly 75–150 mm (3–6 in) long and 50–75 mm (2–3 in) wide on a short petiole. The flower buds are arranged in a branching inflorescence in leaf axils, or on the end of branchlets, each branch with groups of seven buds, the individual buds on a pedicel about 5 mm (3/16 in) long. Mature buds are pale green or cream-coloured, roughly spherical in shape and 2–5 mm (1/16–3/16 in) in diameter with a hemispherical operculum with a small point on the top. Flowering time depends on location, and the stamens that give the flowers their colour are white and pale yellow. The fruit is a woody, brown, hemispherical capsule about 3–5 mm (1/8–3/16 in) long and wide, with three or four valves extending beyond the rim of the fruit. Each cell of the fruit contains between three and twelve minute brown seeds, each with a small wing.

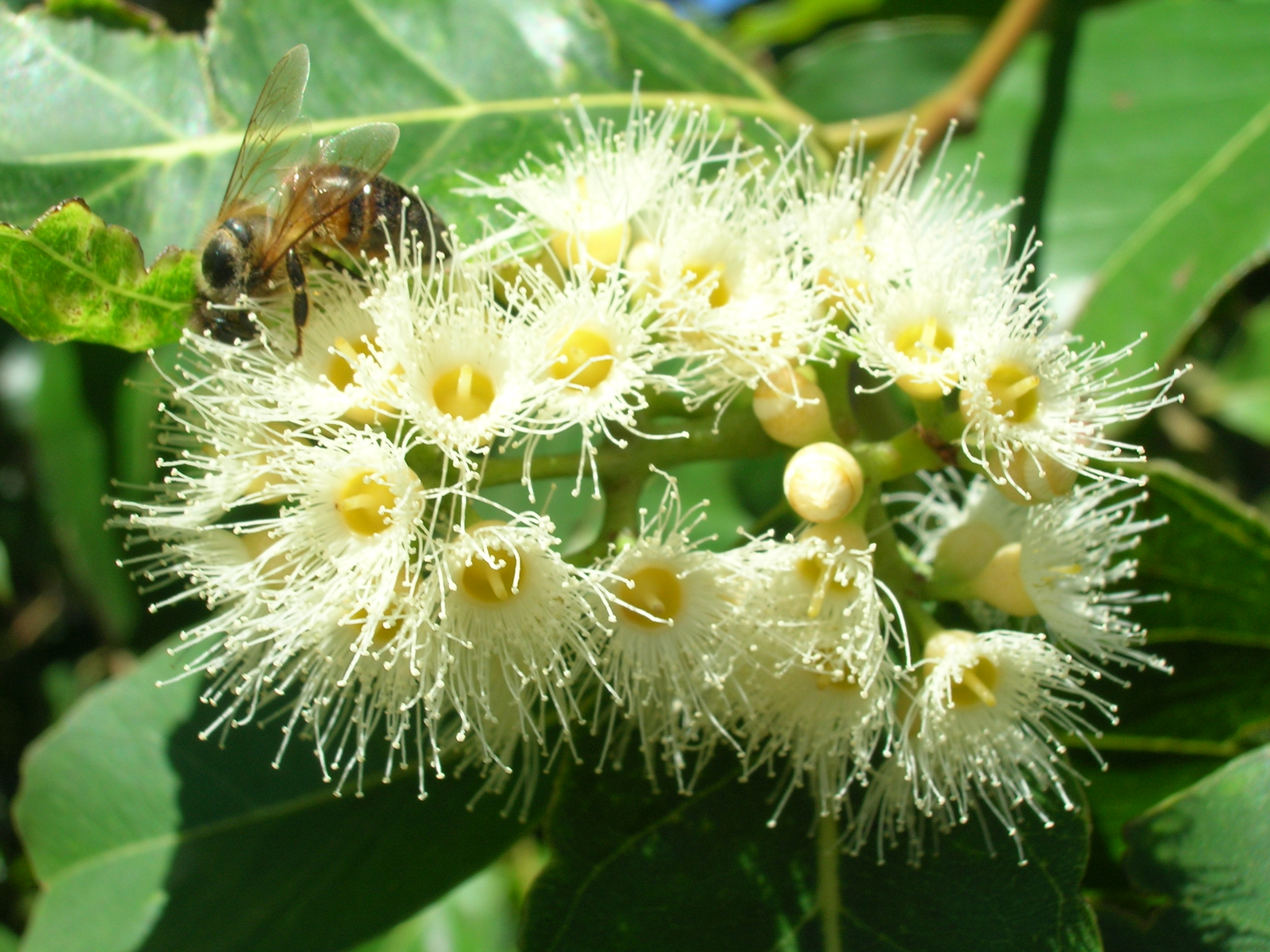
Flowers

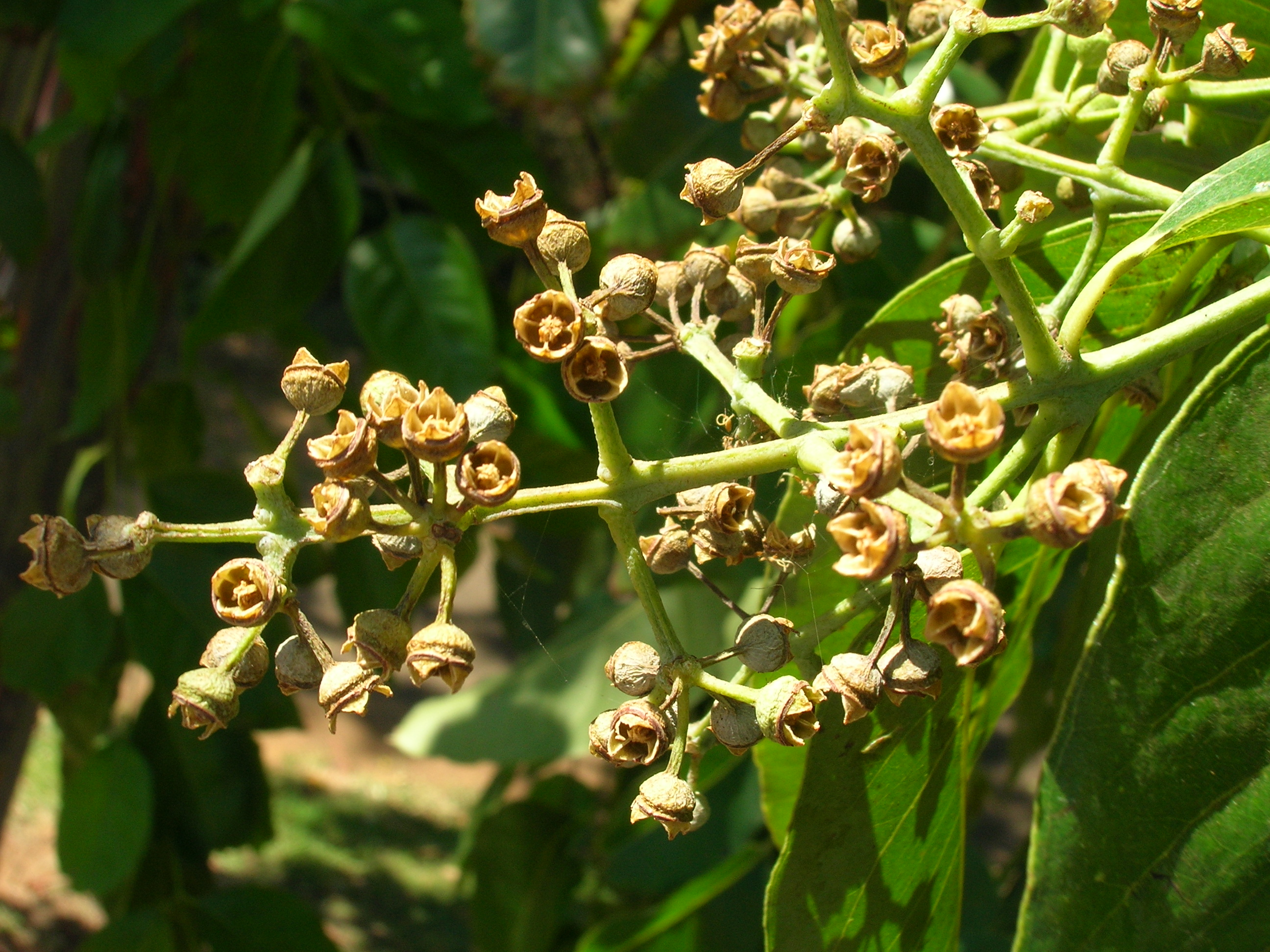
Fruit

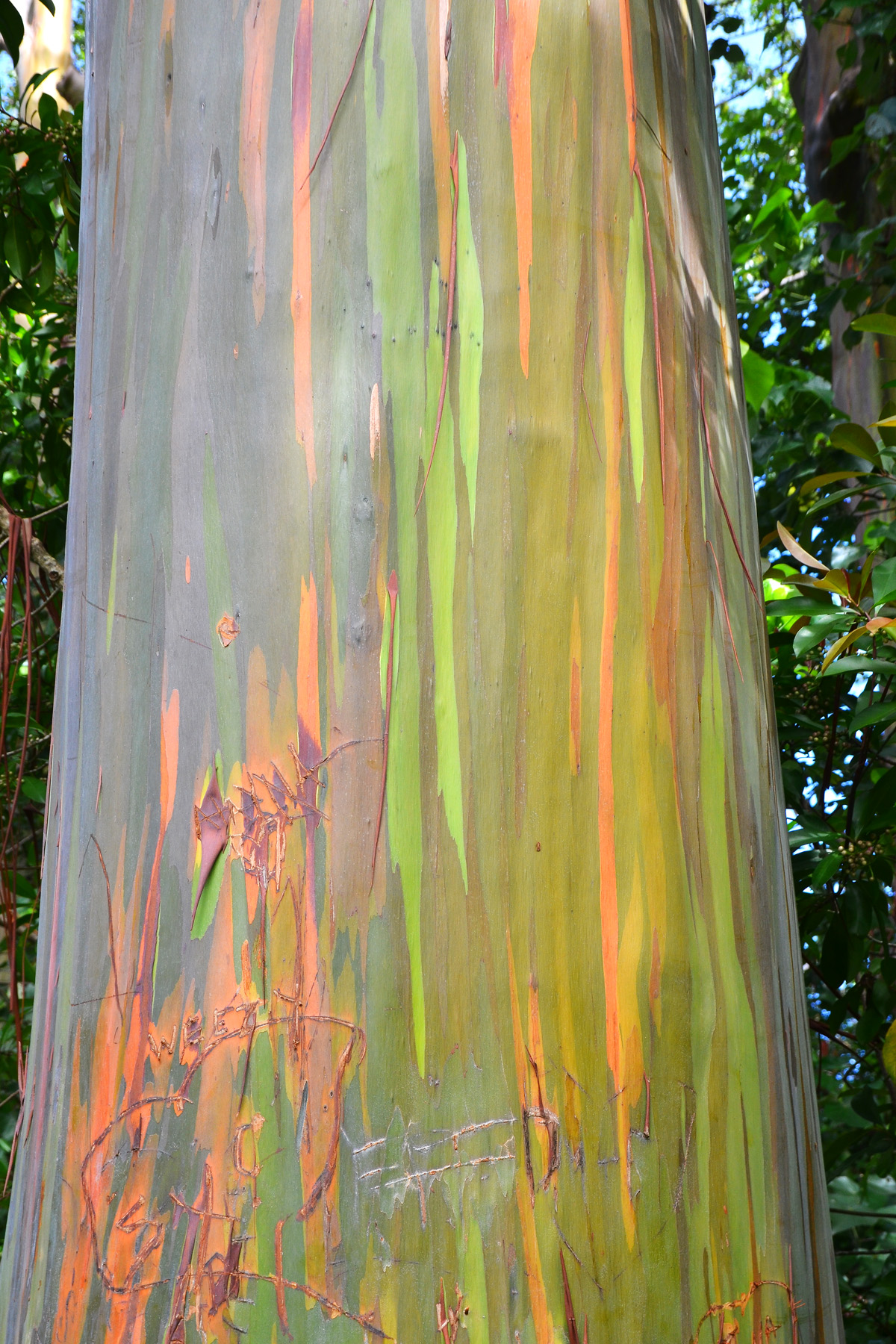
Bark

== Taxonomy and naming ==
Eucalyptus deglupta was first formally described in 1850 by Carl Ludwig Blume who published the description in his book Museum Botanicum Lugduno-Batavum sive stirpium Exoticarum, Novarum vel Minus Cognitarum ex Vivis aut Siccis Brevis Expositio et Descriptio from material collected in mountain forests in the Celebes. The specific epithet (deglupta) is a Latin word meaning "peeled off, husked or shelled".

In 1854, Asa Gray described Eucalyptus multiflora in United States Exploring Expedition - Botany, Phanerogamia from an unpublished description by Louis Claude Richard, but is a nomen illegitimum because the name was already in use for a different species (Eucalyptus multiflora Poir.) now known as Eucalyptus robusta.

Eucalyptus sarassa and E. versicolor, first described in 1850 by Blume in his book Museum botanicum Lugduno-Batavum, and E. schlechteri first described by Ludwig Diels in Adolf Engler's book Botanische Jahrbücher für Systematik, Pflanzengeschichte und Pflanzengeographie are also considered to be synonyms of E. deglupta by Plants of the World Online.

The species Eucalyptus binacag, also from the Philippines, formerly regarded as a synonym of E. deglupta, is now considered a separate species.

== Distribution and habitat ==
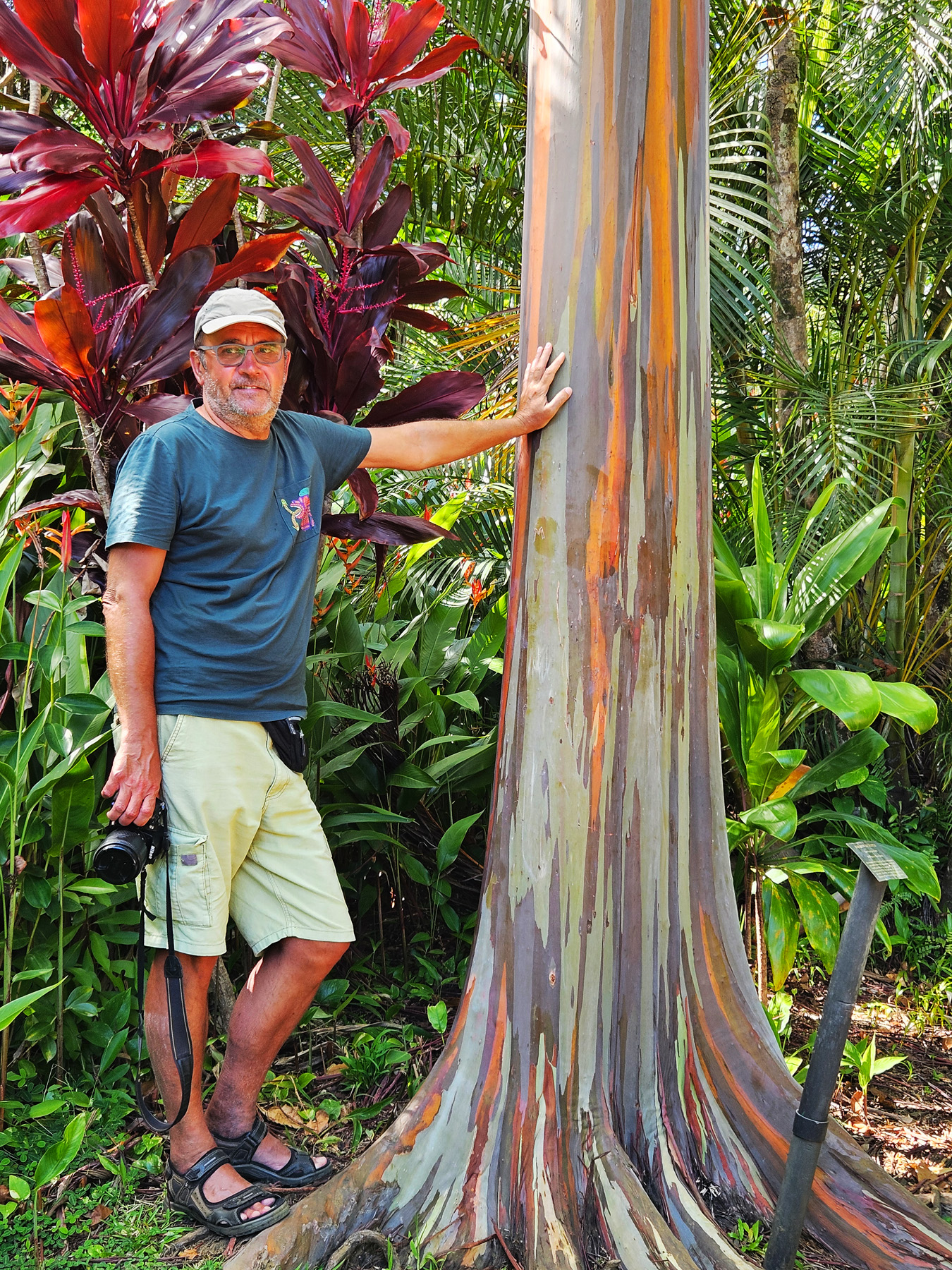
Eucalyptus deglupta Blume, Maui

The rainbow eucalyptus grows in lowland and lower montane rainforest from sea level to elevations of up to 1,800 m (5,900 ft). It is native to the Philippines, Indonesia, and Papua New Guinea, but has been widely planted in many other countries.

The populations of this species are severely fragmented in the wild and the overall population is decreasing. Over the last 210 years it is estimated that there has been a 30% decline of the overall population. The International Union for the Conservation of Nature listed E. deglupta as a vulnerable species in 2019.

== Uses ==
=== Pulpwood ===
This tree is grown widely around the world in tree plantations, mainly for pulpwood used in making white paper. It is the dominant species used for pulpwood plantations in the Philippines.

=== Use in horticulture ===
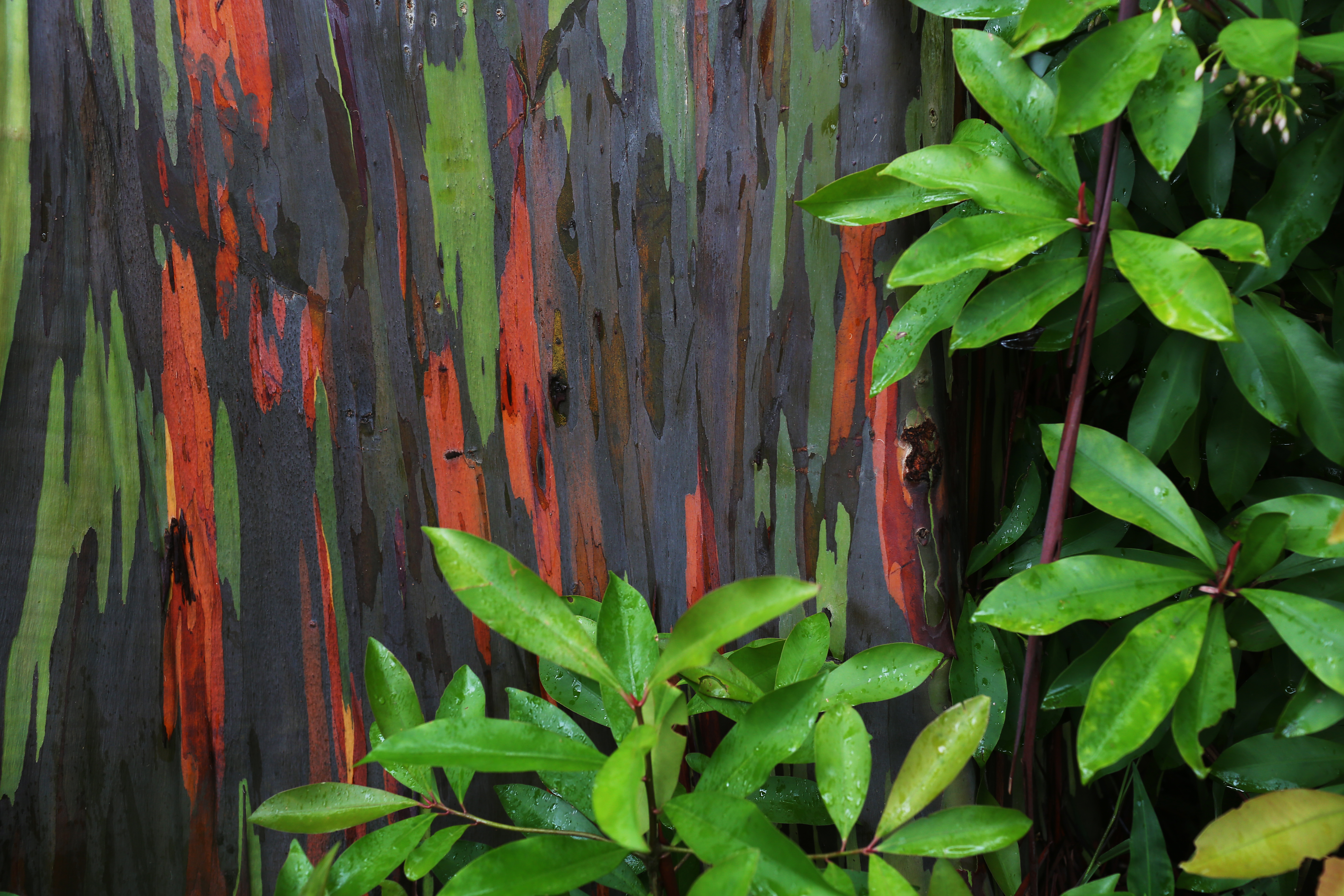
Bark of E. deglupta in a grove of trees on Maui, Hawaii

Eucalyptus deglupta is commonly planted as an ornamental tree in frost-free climates such as Hawaii, Southern California, Texas and Florida. It is planted in at least three locations in coastal Los Angeles County, including Santa Monica and San Marino at the Huntington Botanical Garden. These trees were still growing, but relatively young at approximately 30–40 years in 1988, at the UCLA Botanic Garden and as a LA City street tree.

If grown from seed, the temperature should be around 20–22 °C (68–72 °F). Plants can be grown from cuttings of trees younger than 5 years old. Once a tree reaches 5 years of age, root inhibition prevents the generation of roots from cuttings. It thrives in rich medium-to-wet soil in full sun and is intolerant of frost. In botanical gardens such as Fairchild Tropical Botanic Garden in Florida, the tree does show the intense colour range as seen in the tree's normal range.
