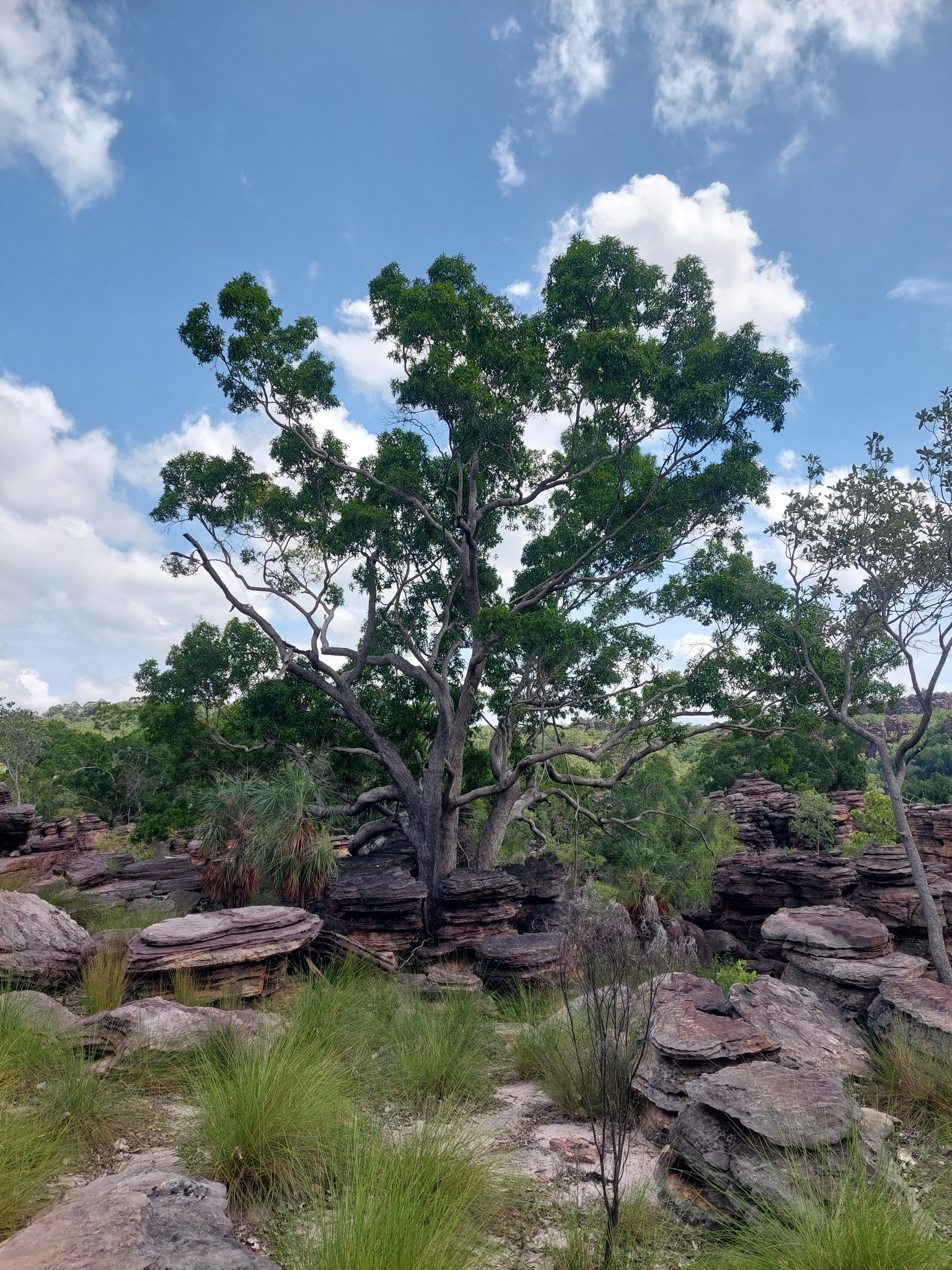

Conservation status
- Data Deficient (IUCN 3.1)

Scientific classification
- Kingdom: Plantae
- Clade: Tracheophytes
- Clade: Angiosperms
- Clade: Eudicots
- Clade: Rosids
- Order: Myrtales
- Family: Myrtaceae
- Subfamily: Myrtoideae
- Tribe: Eucalypteae
- Genus: Allosyncarpia; S.T.Blake
- Species: A. ternata

Binomial name
- Allosyncarpia ternata S.T.Blake

= Allosyncarpia =

Genus of flowering plants

Allosyncarpia is a genus of plant in the eucalypt family Myrtaceae. It contains a single species, Allosyncarpia ternata, which is endemic to the Northern Territory, Australia. Both were described in 1981 by Stanley Thatcher Blake of the Queensland Herbarium.

== Description ==
Allosyncarpia ternata is a spreading, shady tree with grey fibrous bark, reaching about 18 m (59 ft) in height. The leaves are somewhat stiff and arranged in whorls of three around the twigs, each attached by a petiole up to 10 mm (0.39 in) long. The leaves grow up to 11 cm (4.3 in) long and 3 cm (1.2 in) wide, and are narrowly ovate to elliptic, with 16–22 pairs of lateral veins.

Flowers are arranged in groups of three in racemose or paniculate inflorescences. They have five petals and numerous stamens. The fruit is a two-celled capsule which splits open at maturity, but usually only one cell contains a seed.

== Distribution and habitat ==
They grow in sandstone gorges along creeks emerging from the Arnhem Land plateau. The tree dominates the closed monsoon rainforest communities along the sandstone escarpment of the western Arnhem Land Plateau. The distribution of the species appears to be limited to areas not subject to wildfire.

== Ecology ==
Allosyncarpia dominated rainforest is an important vegetation community along the floristic boundary between the patches of monsoon forest that are sheltered from wildfire, and the fire-tolerant, eucalypt dominated, tropical savannas. A species of sandstone favouring monitor, the long-tailed Varanus glebopalma, is closely associated with Allosyncarpia woodland in some parts of its range.

== Conservation status ==
This plant has been assessed as being of least concern under the Northern Territory government's Territory Parks and Wildlife Conservation Act. The IUCN Red List assesses the species as data deficient.

== Etymology ==
The common name anbinik comes from the Kundedjnjenghmi and Kundjeyhmi dialects of Bininj Kunwok, spoken in West Arnhem Land. In other dialects, such as the Kunwinjku spoken in Gunbalanya, the tree is known as manbinik.
