= Sarcostroma =

Scientific classification
- Kingdom: Fungi
- Division: Ascomycota
- Class: Sordariomycetes
- Order: Amphisphaeriales
- Family: Sporocadaceae
- Genus: Sarcostroma; Cooke

Type species
- Sarcostroma berkeleyi Cooke, 1871

Genus of fungi

Sarcostroma is a genus of fungi in the family Sporocadaceae. Most species of this genus are saprobes, endophytes or pathogens on leaves (Maharachchikumbura et al. 2016b, Norphanphoun et al. 2015, Farr & Rossman 2019).

The type species is Sarcostroma berkeleyi Cooke.

== History ==
In Sir William Jackson Hooker's book, 'British Flora' (1836), English cryptogamist, Miles Joseph Berkeley (1803–1889), had described a fungal parasite (Savin leaf spot) on the leaves of Juniperus sabina and it was later identified as Podisoma foliicola. It was found in the spring time, on living leaves, as a small sub-elliptic black excrescences (outgrowths) and it is not larger than the head of a pin. When Cooke re-examined the specimens in 1871, he found them to be different to other Podisoma genus species and so re-named and published it as Sarcostroma berkeleyi in Berkeley's honour.

The genus Sarcostroma was introduced by Cooke in 1872. Then British mycologist Brian Charles Sutton in 1980, reduced Sarcostroma to synonymy with the Seimatosporium genus (another Sporocadaceae family genus) that had accommodated species having 2–5-septate conidia with only a basal appendage, or without any appendages. He acknowledged the heterogeneity of the genus, and thought that Seimatosporium would or could later be subdivided. Sarcostroma was reintroduced by mycologist and lichenologist Nag Raj in 1993, to accommodate some of the species classified under Seimatosporium. He still retained the genus Seimatosporium for species having a mixture of conidia with and without appendages in a single isolate, and Sarcostroma for species having multi-septate, fusiform conidia with attenuated centric apical and excentric basal appendages. Three collections treated in this study had 4-septate conidia with single centric apical and excentric basal appendages.

The inter-generic relationships and generic status of pestalotioid fungi (Bartalinia, Monochaetia (Sacc.) Allesch., Pestalotia, Pestalotiopsis, Sarcostroma, Seimatosporium and Truncatella) have all been the subject of considerable debate in the past. This has been largely due to different generic concepts, and inadequate or overlapping morphological characters used to delineate the genera within the family. Such as (Steyaert 1949, Guba 1961, Sutton 1980, Nag Raj 1993, Jeewon et al. 2002).

Later published studies which used rDNA sequence data have, however, clarified the confusion, and provided a more complete understanding of the phylogeny and the genetic breakdown for each pestalotioid fungi genus (Jeewon et al. 2002, 2003, 2004,).

== Description ==
It was originally described in 1871 by Cooke, as having septate (divided by a septum) spores, on very long peduncles, radiating from a gelatinous stroma. With small sub-elliptic black excrescences (outgrowths) and it is not larger than the head of a pin.

It has conidia (an asexual, non-motile spore) 4-5 septate, simple or double apical (features located at opposite the base of an organism) appendage.

The genus Sarcostroma was resurrected to accommodate several fungal species which were characterised by fusoid (having a spindle-like shaped) conidia with four or more cells, having pigmented median cells and paler, thin-walled end cells, bearing an attenuated tubular apical appendage and a similar excentric (not having the same center) basal appendage. The holotype of the genus has been reported lost and epitypification is needed (Liu et al. 2019a).

== Distribution ==
It has a widespread, scattered distribution, located in both tropical and temperate regions. Species have been found in America (in parts of North America (including Canada), Central America and South America), Europe, Africa (including South Africa,), Asia (including Japan, and China,), New Zealand, and a lot of recordings in Australia.

== Hosts ==
Sarcostroma sinicum is found in China on the leaves (seen as leaf spot) on Rhododendron xanthostephanum.

Sarcostroma acaciae is found on various species of Acacia including Acacia binervata in Australia.

In 1999, swollen, fissured cankers on branches of Eucalyptus nitens (about 14–19 years old) growing on the West Coast of South Island, New Zealand. The fungal genus of Sarcostroma was first recorded from Rotoehu Forest, on the North Island in 1986 and was associated with galling on branches and leaf veins of Eucalyptus stenostoma. A specimen on twigs of Eucalyptus regnans from the Rotorua area was also recorded by the Forest Research Mycological Herbarium in 1988. On this host (E. regnans), the fungus was associated with twig lesions and minor dieback. A further collection of the fungus was made in 1998 in the Nelson Lakes National Park, South Island where it was associated with minor dieback of a species of Eucalyptus from a mixed stand of Eucalyptus delegatensis, Eucalyptus nitens and also Eucalyptus regnans.

In 2003, Griphosphaerioma zelkovicola (another fungi in the family Amphisphaeriaceae) that was recorded having Sarcostroma as an anamorph (asexual reproductive stage), was first observed in Japan on the bark of Zelkova serrata tree.

Eight pestalotioid fungi were isolated from the Restionaceae (flowering plants) growing in the Western Cape Province nature reserves of South Africa. They included Pestalotiopsis matildae, Sarcostroma lomatiae, Sarcostroma restionis, Truncatella betulae,Truncatella hartigii, Truncatella megaspora, Truncatella restionacearum and Truncatella spadicea. Sarcostroma lomatiae (McAlpine) Nag Raj was hosted on Lomatia ilicifolia (in the Proteaceae family) and Ischyrolepis cf. gaudichaudiana (Restionaceae family). Sarcostroma restionis S. Lee & Crous was hosted on Ischyrolepis cf. sieberi and also Restio filiformis (Restionaceae). To clarify and identify the phylogenetic relationships between these and other related pestalotioid fungi, DNA sequence data was used. It also determined that a Discostroma species was the teleomorphic state of either Seimatosporium or Sarcostroma genus.

== Species ==
In 2020, there were 17 species, more have been added. List as accepted by Species Fungorum;

- Sarcostroma acaciae Nag Raj (1993)
- Sarcostroma africanum F. Liu, L. Cai & Crous (2018)
- Sarcostroma australiense F. Liu, L. Cai & Crous (2018)
- Sarcostroma berberidis (Lind) Nag Raj (1993)
- Sarcostroma berkeleyi Cooke (1871)
- Sarcostroma coryneoideum (Harkn.) Nag Raj (1993)
- Sarcostroma diversiseptatum F. Liu, L. Cai & Crous (2018)
- Sarcostroma insidens (Zabriskie) Nag Raj (1993)
- Sarcostroma leucospermi F. Liu, L. Cai & Crous (2018)
- Sarcostroma lomatiae (McAlpine) Nag Raj (1993)
- Sarcostroma longiappendiculatum F. Liu, L. Cai & Crous (2018)
- Sarcostroma mahinapuense Gadgil & M.A. Dick (1999)
- Sarcostroma microsorum (Sacc.) Nag Raj (1993)
- Sarcostroma paragrevilleae F. Liu, L. Cai & Crous (2018)
- Sarcostroma plagiochaetum (Sacc.) Nag Raj (1993)
- Sarcostroma proteae F. Liu, L. Cai & Crous (2018)
- Sarcostroma restionis S.J. Lee & Crous (2006)
- Sarcostroma sinicum Nag Raj (1993)
- Sarcostroma zelkovicola Yas. Ono & Tak. Kobay. (2003)

Former species (all within the Sporocadaceae family);

- S. arbuti (Bonar) M. Morelet (1985) = Disaeta arbuti
- S. brevilatum (H.J. Swart & D.A. Griffiths) Nag Raj (1993) = Allelochaeta brevilata
- S. cadicola (B. Sutton) M. Morelet (1985) = Seimatosporium cadicola
- S. consocium (Peck) M. Morelet (1985) = Seimatosporium consocium
- S. daviesiae (McAlpine) M. Morelet (1985) = Seimatosporium daviesiae
- S. dilophosporum (Cooke) M. Morelet (1985) = Allelochaeta dilophospora
- S. foliicola (Berk.) M. Morelet (1985) = Seimatosporium foliicola
- S. grevilleae (Loos) M. Morelet (1985) = Seimatosporium grevilleae
- S. hakeae (B. Sutton) M. Morelet (1985) = Seimatosporium hakeae
- S. hollosii (Tóth) M. Morelet (1985) = Seimatosporium hollosii
- S. kennediae (McAlpine) M. Morelet (1985) = Seimatosporium kennediae
- S. leucopogonis (H.J. Swart) Nag Raj (1993) = Seimatosporium leucopogonis
- S. mariae (Clinton) M. Morelet (1985) = Seimatosporium mariae
- S. parasiticum (Dearn. & House) M. Morelet (1985) = Seimatosporium parasiticum
- S. sublunatum (B. Sutton) M. Morelet (1985) = Seimatosporium sublunatum
