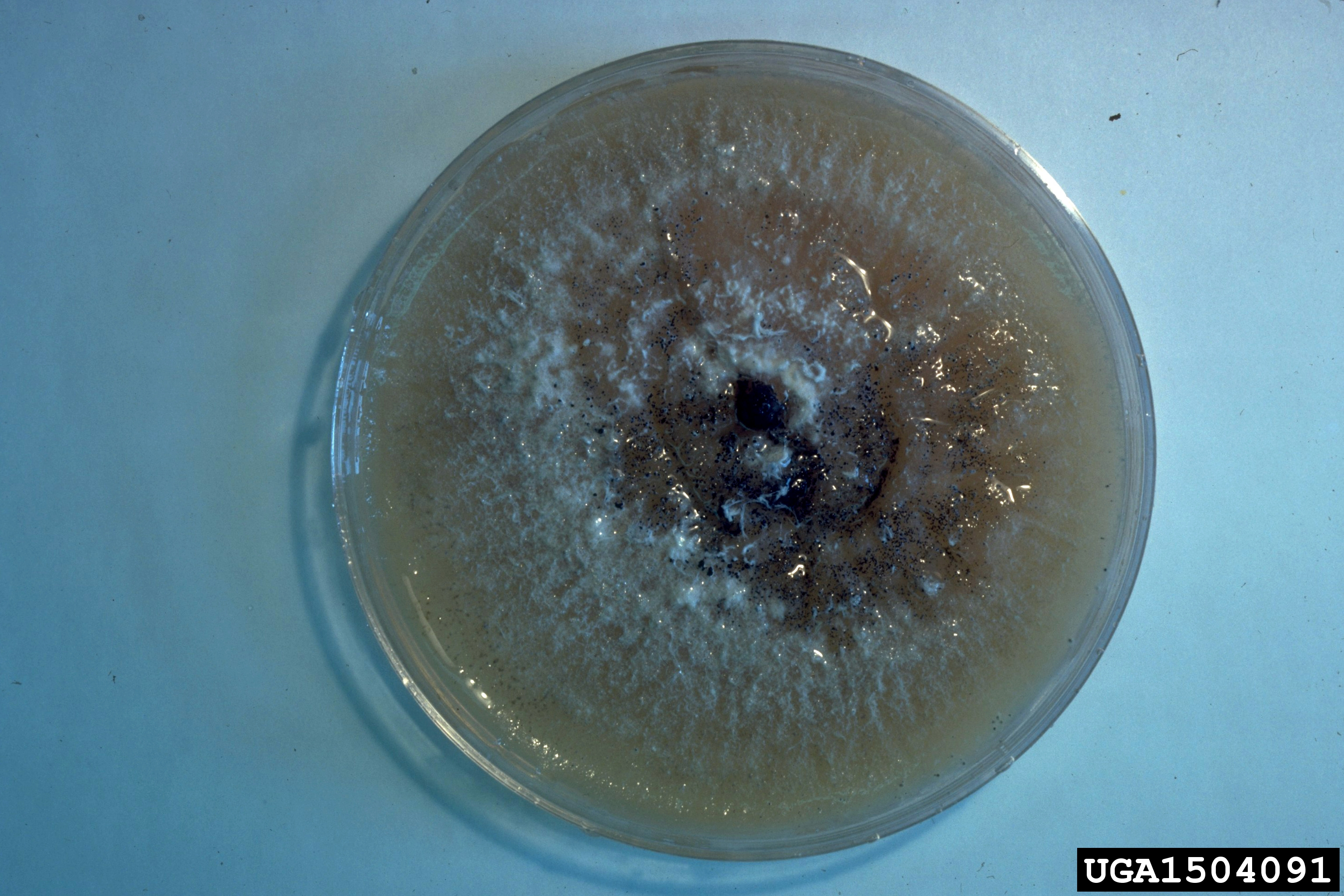
- Pelotia fungi, a species of Amphisphaeriaceae

Scientific classification
- Kingdom: Fungi
- Division: Ascomycota
- Class: Sordariomycetes
- Order: Amphisphaeriales
- Family: Amphisphaeriaceae; G.Winter (1885)

Type genus
- Amphisphaeria Ces. & De Not. (1863)

= Amphisphaeriaceae =

Family of fungi

The Amphisphaeriaceae are a family of fungi that is mainly found in parts of New Zealand, South America, Asia and parts of Europe. According to the 2007 Outline of Ascomycota, there were 41 genera placed within the family, although the position of 13 of those genera is uncertain. The 2020 Outline of Fungi and fungus-like taxa severely reduced the family to 4 members.

== Origins and controversies ==
This family of fungi was established as Amphispaerieae to contain the previously unclassified genera Caryospora, Strickeria, Ohleria, and Amphisphaeria, among others. However, the name was forgotten over time. In 1964, the name was reintroduced as the current Amphisphaeriaceae, and genera such as Apiorynchostoma, and again, Amphisphaeria. There was plenty of controversy about which order the Amphisphaeriaceae should be placed in. In 1973, Amphisphaeriaceae was placed under the order Sphaeriales (and some sources still classify it as such). In 1983, however, Amphisphaeriaceae was placed in under the order Amphisphaeriales, along with Cainiaceae, and Hyponectriaceae. After much study, however, Cainiaceae was merged with Amphisphaeriaceae, and were considered Xylariaceous. Because of this, Amphisphaeriaceae was officially placed in the order Xylariales in 1993. In 2020, it was placed by in the order Amphisphaeriales and also subclass Xylariomycetidae.

== Current status ==
Amphisphaeriaceae is a large, complicated family of Ascomycota. The asci are cylindrical or club-shaped, and they have a simple top ring that is amyloid (starchy), or sometimes nonamyloid. Many Amphisphaeriaceae genera have not been linked to anamorphs.

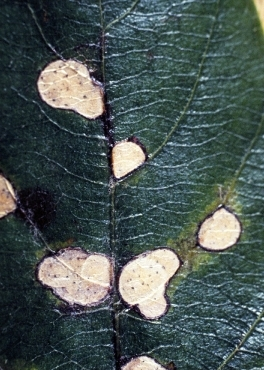
Leaf affected with Monochaetia fungi, a genus of Amphisphaeriaceae

Many fungi that are part of the family are fatal to plants, causing them to die. In fact, several genera of Amphisphaeriaceae have been listed as invasive species.

== Genera ==
In 2007, it held 41 genera; Amphisphaerella — Amphisphaeria — Arecophila — Blogiascospora — Broomella — Cannonia — Capsulospora — Ceriophora — Ceriospora — Chitonospora — Clypeophysalospora — Discostroma — Distorimula — Dyrithiopsis — Dyrithium — Ellurema — Flagellosphaeria — Frondispora — Funiliomyces — Griphosphaerioma — Iodosphaeria — Lanceispora — Leiosphaerella — Lepteutypa — Lindquistomyces — Manokwaria — Monochaetia — Monographella — Mukhakesa — Neobroomella — Neohypodiscus — Ommatomyces — Oxydothis — Paracainiella — Pemphidium — Pestalosphaeria — Reticulosphaeria — Urosporella — Urosporellopsis and Xylochora.

In 2020, it was just 4 genera;

- Amphisphaeria Ces. & De Not. (88)
- Griphosphaerioma Höhn. (2)
- Lepteutypa Petr. (15)
- Trochilispora V.P. Abreu, A.W.C. Rosado & O.L. Pereira (1)

Figures in brackets are approx. how many species per genus.

Of the previous genera; Amphisphaerella (lost) — Arecophila (now in Cainiaceae family) — Blogiascospora (lost) — Broomella (now Sporocadaceae) — Cannonia (Coniochaetales genera incertae sedis) — Capsulospora (lost) — Ceriophora — Ceriospora (lost) — Chitonospora (Amphisphaeriales genus incertae sedis) — Clypeophysalospora (Clypeophysalosporaceae) — Discostroma (lost) — Distorimula (lost) — Dyrithiopsis (within Hymenopleella genus, Sporocadaceae) — Dyrithium (lost) — Ellurema (lost) — Flagellosphaeria (lost) — Frondispora (lost) — Funiliomyces (lost) — Iodosphaeria (Iodosphaeriaceae) — Lanceispora (Xylariales genera incertae sedis) — Leiosphaerella (Pseudomassariaceae) — Lindquistomyces (lost) — Manokwaria (lost) — Monochaetia (Sporocadaceae) — Monographella (in Idriella genus, Microdochiaceae) — Mukhakesa (lost) — Neobroomella (lost) — Neohypodiscus (Boliniaceae) — Ommatomyces (Clypeosphaeriaceae) — Oxydothis (Oxydothidaceae) — Paracainiella (lost) — Pemphidium (lost) — Pestalosphaeria (Pestalotiopsidaceae) — Reticulosphaeria (lost) — Urosporella (Sordariomycetes genera incertae sedis) — Urosporellopsis (lost) and Xylochora (lost).

== Works cited ==
- https://web.archive.org/web/20120210055418/http://zipcodezoo.com/Key/Amphisphaeriaceae_Family.asp
- http://www.invasive.org/listview.cfm?list=4
- http://journals.cambridge.org/action/displayAbstract?fromPage=online&aid=42641
- http://www.fungaldiversity.org/fdp/sfdp/FD_1_147-157.pdf
- http://beta.uniprot.org/taxonomy/97129
- http://www.invasive.org/browse/family.cfm?id=902
