= A. alpigena =

A. alpigena may refer to:

- Agonopterix alpigena, a species of moth
- Alchemilla alpigena, a species of flowering plant in the genus Alchemilla
- Amphisphaerella alpigena, a species of fungus in the genus Amphisphaerella
- Antocha alpigena, a species of fly in the genus Antocha
- Arctosa alpigena, a species of wolf spider
- Asteromella alpigena, a species of fungus in the genus Asteromella
- Apamea alpigena, a species of moth in the genus Apamea
- Aulacoseira alpigena, a species of diatom in the genus Aulacoseira
