= Lindquistomyces =

Scientific classification
- Kingdom: Fungi
- Division: Ascomycota
- Class: Sordariomycetes
- Order: Amphisphaeriales
- Family: Amphisphaeriaceae
- Genus: Lindquistomyces; Aramb., E.Müll. & Gamundí (1982)
- Species: L. antarcticus

Binomial name
- Lindquistomyces antarcticus (Speg.) Aramb., E.Müll. & Gamundí (1982)

Synonyms
- Species synonymy: Ophiobolus antarcticus Speg. (1888)

Genus of fungi

Lindquistomyces is a fungal genus in the family Amphisphaeriaceae. This is a monotypic genus, containing the single species Lindquistomyces antarcticus. This species was originally described as Ophiobolus antarcticus by Carlos Luigi Spegazzini in 1887.

The genus name of Lindquistomyces is in honour of Juan Carlos Lindquist (1899-1990), who was an Argentine agricultural engineer and botanist (Mycology), plantpathologist and specialist in uredinales (rust fungi) and Professor at the Universidad Nacional de La Plata.

The genus was circumscribed by Angélica Margarita Arambarri, Emil Müller and Irma Josefa Gamundí de Amos in Sydowia vol.35 on page 6 in 1982.
