= E. indica =

E. indica may refer to:

- Eleusine indica, the Indian goosegrass, wiregrass or crowfootgrass, an invasive grass species
- Ellurema indica, a fungus species
- Eugenia indica, a plant species endemic to India
- Eulabeia indica, the bar-headed goose, a bird species

== Synonyms ==
- Erythrina indica, a synonym for Erythrina variegata, a tree species
- Eupodotis indica, a synonym for Sypheotides indica, a large bird species

== See also ==
- Indica (disambiguation)
