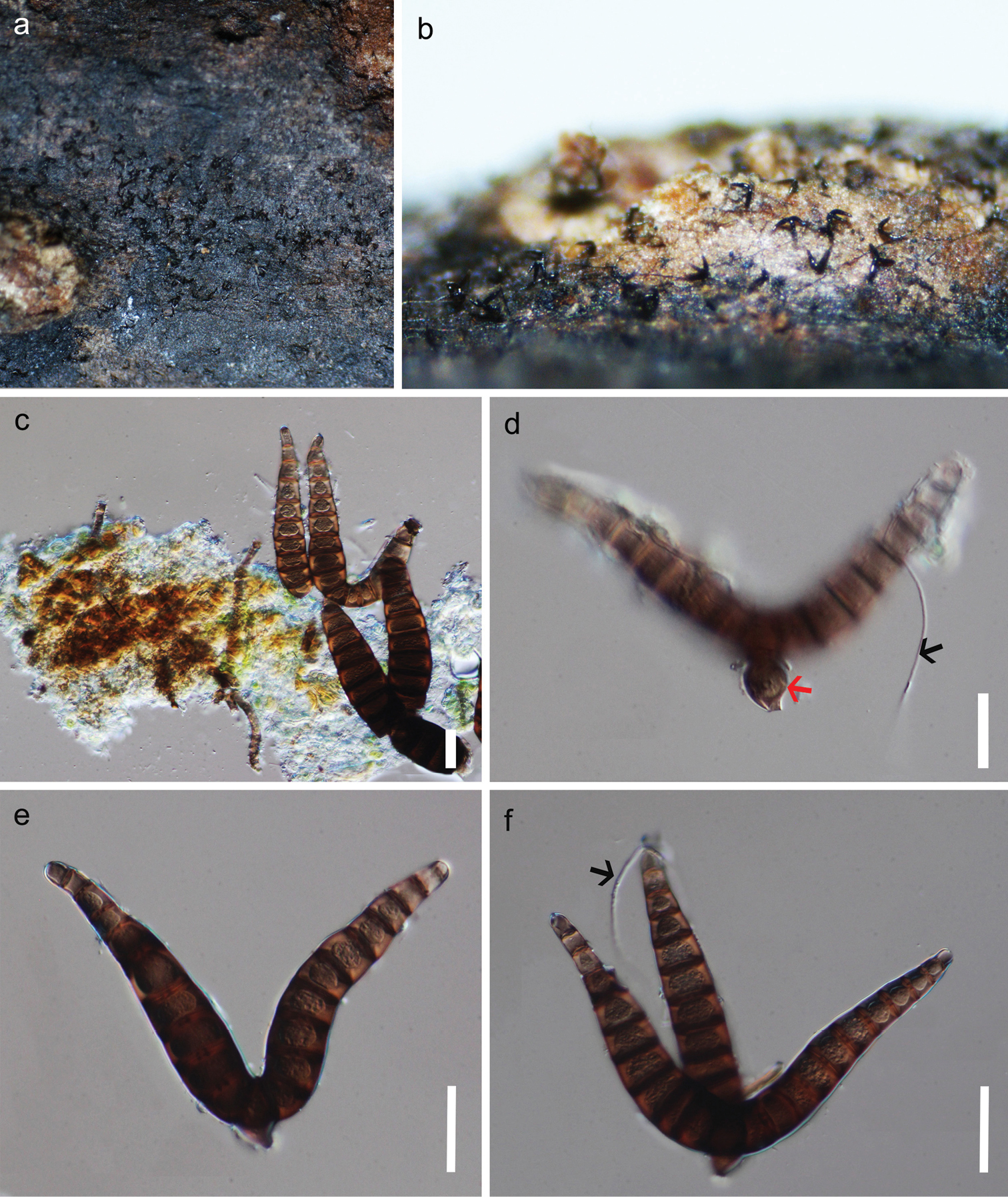
- Iodosphaeria jinghongensis

Scientific classification
- Kingdom: Fungi
- Division: Ascomycota
- Class: Sordariomycetes
- Order: Amphisphaeriales
- Family: Iodosphaeriaceae
- Genus: Iodosphaeria; Samuels, E. Müll. & O. Petrini

Type species
- Iodosphaeria phyllophila (Mouton) Samuels, E. Müll. & Petrini

= Iodosphaeria =

Genus of fungi

Iodosphaeria is a genus of fungi in the family Amphisphaeriaceae. Most of species of Iodosphaeria are saprobes that feed on dead leaves and twigs of various hosts such as the Argentine white pine. No species have been reported as pathogenic to hosts. As of January 2022, it contains eleven species.

== Species ==
- Iodosphaeria arundinariae
- Iodosphaeria chiayiensis
- Iodosphaeria foliicola
- Iodosphaeria honghensis
- Iodosphaeria hongkongensis
- Iodosphaeria jinghongensis
- Iodosphaeria podocarpi
- Iodosphaeria phyllophila
- Iodosphaeria ripogoni
- Iodosphaeria thailandica
- Iodosphaeria tongrenensis

Iodosphaeria aquatica was proposed by K.D. Hyde in 1995, but was rejected from the genus based on having morphology similar to Pseudohalonectria lignicola.

== Phylogeny ==
Samuels et al. (1987) accepted Iodosphaeria into the family Amphisphaeriaceae. However different authors placed it in both Lasiosphaeriaceae and Trichosphaeriaceae between 1990 and 2003. However Erikkson et al. (2001) disputed this and returned Iodosphaeria to Amphisphaeriaceae, whereas Hilber and Hilber (2002) proposed a new family, Iodosphaeriaceae, in order Xylariales, most recently supposed by Miller and Réblová in 2021. However Hongsanan et al. (2017) considered Iodosphaeriaceae as Xylariomycetidae incertae sedis. Another analysis by Wijayawardene et al (2020) accepted the family Iodosphaeriaceae in the order Amphisphaeriales.
