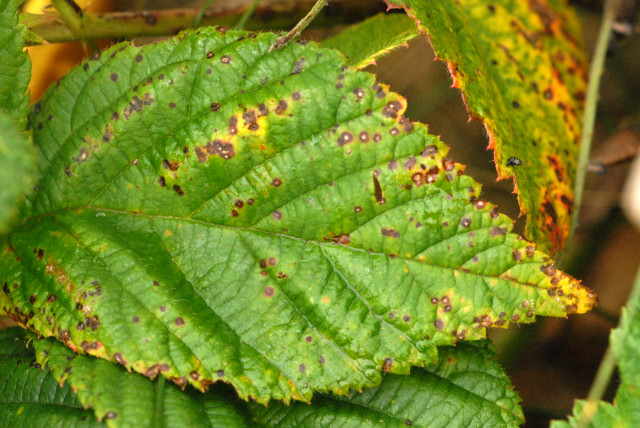

Scientific classification
- Kingdom: Fungi
- Division: Ascomycota
- Class: Sordariomycetes
- Order: Amphisphaeriales
- Family: Amphisphaeriaceae
- Genus: Discostroma
- Species: D. corticola

Binomial name
- Discostroma corticola (Fuckel) Brockmann, (1976)

Synonyms
- Ascospora rubi Clethridium corticola Griphosphaeria corticola Hendersonia lichenicola Hendersonia rubi Hendersonia sarmentorum var. rubi Metasphaeria corticola Seimatosporium lichenicola Sphaeria corticola Sporocadus lichenicola

= Discostroma corticola =

Species of fungus

Discostroma corticola is a plant pathogen.
