= Apiospora montagnei =

Scientific classification
- Domain: Eukaryota
- Kingdom: Fungi
- Division: Ascomycota
- Class: Sordariomycetes
- Order: Amphisphaeriales
- Family: Apiosporaceae
- Genus: Apiospora
- Species: A. montagnei

Binomial name
- Apiospora montagnei Sacc., (1875)

Synonyms
- Arthrinium arundinis Coniosporium arundinis Gymnosporium arundinis Hyptopteris apiospora Papularia arundinis Phyllachora cyperi var. donacis Sphaeria apiospora Sphaeria montagnei Tubercularia apiospora

Species of fungus

Apiospora montagnei is a plant pathogen that causes kernel blight on barley but is more often seen a saprophyte or secondary invader of many other plant species.
