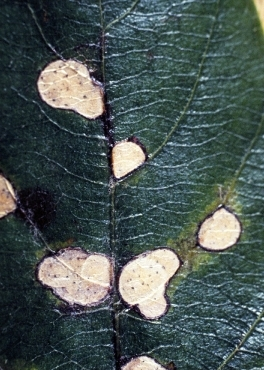
- A picture of a leaf affected with Monochaetia fungi, a genus of Amphisphaeriaceae.

Scientific classification
- Domain: Eukaryota
- Kingdom: Fungi
- Division: Ascomycota
- Class: Sordariomycetes
- Order: Amphisphaeriales
- Family: Sporocadaceae
- Genus: Monochaetia (Sacc.) Allesch. (1902)

Type species
- Monochaetia monochaeta (Desm.) Allesch. (1902)

Synonyms
- Lennisia Nieuwl. (1916); Pestalotia subgen. Monochaetia Sacc. (1884)

= Monochaetia =

Genus of fungi

Monochaetia is a genus of fungi in the family Sporocadaceae. Species in the genus are typically plant parasites and saprobes, and cause leaf spot diseases on various hosts.

The genus Monochaetia was introduced by Allescher in 1902, it had 23 species originally. Allescher (1902) also designated the type as Monochaetia monochaeta, which has a single apical appendage (Guba 1961; Maharachch. et al. 2014; Senanayake et al. 2015). Steyaert (in 1949) transferred numerous Monochaetia species to Pestalotiopsis or Truncatella. More than 40 species of Monochaetia were recognised by the monograph of Guba (1961). There are 127 Monochaetia epithets in the Index Fungorum (as of 31 March 2022) and most have been transferred to other genera such as Sarcostroma, Seimatosporium and Seiridium (Nag Raj 1993; Maharachch. et al. 2011, 2014, 2016).

== Species ==
As accepted by Species Fungorum;

- Monochaetia breviformis Purohit, Panwar & N.L. Vyas (1972)
- Monochaetia caffra Matsush. (1996)
- Monochaetia camelliae Miles (1926)
- Monochaetia carissae Munjal & J.N. Kapoor (1963)
- Monochaetia caryotae Y.X. Chen & G. Wei (2002)
- Monochaetia castaneae C.M. Tian & N. Jiang (2021)
- Monochaetia compta (Sacc.) Allesch. (1902)
- Monochaetia concentrica (Berk. & Broome) Sacc. & D. Sacc. (1906)
- Monochaetia cornicola I. Hino & Katum. (1958)
- Monochaetia cryptomeriae M. Wilson & Ford-Rob. (1923)
- Monochaetia curtisii Guba (1961)
- Monochaetia cycadis Y.X. Chen & G. Wei (2002)
- Monochaetia dalbergiae S. Ahmad (1972)
- Monochaetia dimorphospora T. Yokoy. (1975)
- Monochaetia diospyri Yoshii (1954)
- Monochaetia elaeocarpi Y.X. Chen & G. Wei (2002)
- Monochaetia garciniae Y.X. Chen & G. Wei (2002)
- Monochaetia hirta Y.X. Chen & G. Wei (2002)
- Monochaetia hysteriiformis (Berk. & M.A. Curtis) Guba (1961)
- Monochaetia ilicina (Sacc.) Nag Raj (1985)
- Monochaetia ilicis N.I. de Silva, Phookamsak & K.D. Hyde (2017)
- Monochaetia jabalpurensis G.P. Agarwal & Hasija (1961)
- Monochaetia junipericola Crous & R.K. Schumach. (2018)
- Monochaetia karstenii (Sacc. & P. Syd.) B. Sutton (1970)
- Monochaetia lentisci Gonz. Frag. (1924)
- Monochaetia mangiferae G.C. Chawla (1989)
- Monochaetia massachusettsianum Crous & Jurjević (2019)
- Monochaetia monochaeta (Desm.) Allesch. (1902)
- Monochaetia nodosporella G.C. Zhao & Nan Li (1994)
- Monochaetia osyridella (Tassi) Sacc. & D. Sacc. (1906)
- Monochaetia pachyspora Bubák (1904)
- Monochaetia punicae (Shreem. & M. Reddy) Vanev (1992)
- Monochaetia quercus F. Liu, L. Cai & Crous (2018)
- Monochaetia rhododendricola Yoshii (1951)
- Monochaetia rosenwaldii Khaz. (1923)
- Monochaetia rubi Lebezh. (1959)
- Monochaetia russeliae Guba (1961)
- Monochaetia sabinae Y.X. Chen & G. Wei (2002)
- Monochaetia saccardoi (Speg.) Allesch. (1902)
- Monochaetia salaccae Y.X. Chen & G. Wei (2002)
- Monochaetia schini M.T. Lucas & Sousa da Câmara (1954)
- Monochaetia seiridioides (Sacc.) Allesch. (1902)
- Monochaetia sinensis N.I. de Silva, Phookamsak, Maharachch. & K.D. Hyde (2018)
- Monochaetia taphrinicola (Ellis & Everh.) Sacc. & D. Sacc. (1906)
- Monochaetia vernoniae S. Ahmad (1971)
