= Lanceispora =

Scientific classification
- Kingdom: Fungi
- Division: Ascomycota
- Class: Sordariomycetes
- Order: Amphisphaeriales
- Family: Amphisphaeriaceae
- Genus: Lanceispora; Nakagiri, I. Okane, Tad. Ito & Katumoto

Type species
- Lanceispora amphibia Nakagiri, Okane, Tad. Ito & Katum.

Genus of fungi

Lanceispora is a genus of fungi in the family Amphisphaeriaceae.
