= Clypeophysalospora =

Scientific classification
- Kingdom: Fungi
- Division: Ascomycota
- Class: Sordariomycetes
- Order: Amphisphaeriales
- Family: Amphisphaeriaceae
- Genus: Clypeophysalospora; H.J. Swart

Type species
- Clypeophysalospora latitans (Sacc.) H.J. Swart

Genus of fungi

Clypeophysalospora is a genus of fungi in the family Amphisphaeriaceae; according to the 2007 Outline of Ascomycota, the placement in this family is uncertain. This is a monotypic genus, containing the single species Clypeophysalospora latitans.
