= Manokwaria =

Scientific classification
- Kingdom: Fungi
- Division: Ascomycota
- Class: Sordariomycetes
- Order: Amphisphaeriales
- Family: Amphisphaeriaceae
- Genus: Manokwaria; K.D. Hyde

Type species
- Manokwaria notabilis K.D. Hyde

Genus of fungi

Manokwaria is a genus of fungi in the family Amphisphaeriaceae. This is a monotypic genus, containing the single species Manokwaria notabilis.
