= Xylochora =

Scientific classification
- Kingdom: Fungi
- Division: Ascomycota
- Class: Sordariomycetes
- Order: Amphisphaeriales
- Family: Amphisphaeriaceae
- Genus: Xylochora; Arx & E. Müll.

Type species
- Xylochora craticola (H. Wegelin) Arx & E. Müll.

Genus of fungi

Xylochora is a genus of fungi in the family Amphisphaeriaceae.
