= Ceriospora =

Scientific classification
- Kingdom: Fungi
- Division: Ascomycota
- Class: Sordariomycetes
- Order: Amphisphaeriales
- Family: Amphisphaeriaceae
- Genus: Ceriospora; Niessl (1876)

Type species
- Ceriospora dubyi Niessl (1876)

Species
- C. dubyi C. polygonacearum

Synonyms
- Hindersonia Moug. & Nestl. ex J.Schröt. (1897)

Genus of fungi

Ceriospora is a genus of fungi in the family Amphisphaeriaceae; according to the 2007 Outline of Ascomycota, the placement of this family is uncertain.
