= Griphosphaerioma =

Scientific classification
- Kingdom: Fungi
- Division: Ascomycota
- Class: Sordariomycetes
- Order: Amphisphaeriales
- Family: Amphisphaeriaceae
- Genus: Griphosphaerioma; Höhn.

Type species
- Griphosphaerioma symphoricarpi (Ellis & Everh.) Höhn. ex Petr.

Genus of fungi

Griphosphaerioma is a genus of fungi in the family Amphisphaeriaceae. It is also in the Subclass Xylariomycetidae O.E. Erikss & Winka and order Amphisphaeriales D. Hawksw. & O.E. Erikss.

== Distribution ==
Griphosphaerioma kansensis has only been found in Kansas within the United States of America, hence the name 'kansensis'. Griphosphaerioma zelkovicola was first observed in Japan on the bark of the tree Zelkova serrata.

== Species ==
As accepted by Species Fungorum;

- Griphosphaerioma kansensis (Ellis & Everh.) Shoemaker (1963)
- Griphosphaerioma zelkovicola Yas. Ono & Tak. Kobay. (2003)

Former species;

- G. symphoricarpi (Rehm) Höhn. (1918) = Valsa symphoricarpi, Valsaceae
- G. symphoricarpi (Ellis & Everh.) Höhn. ex Petr. (1921) = Dothidotthia symphoricarpi, Dothidotthiaceae
