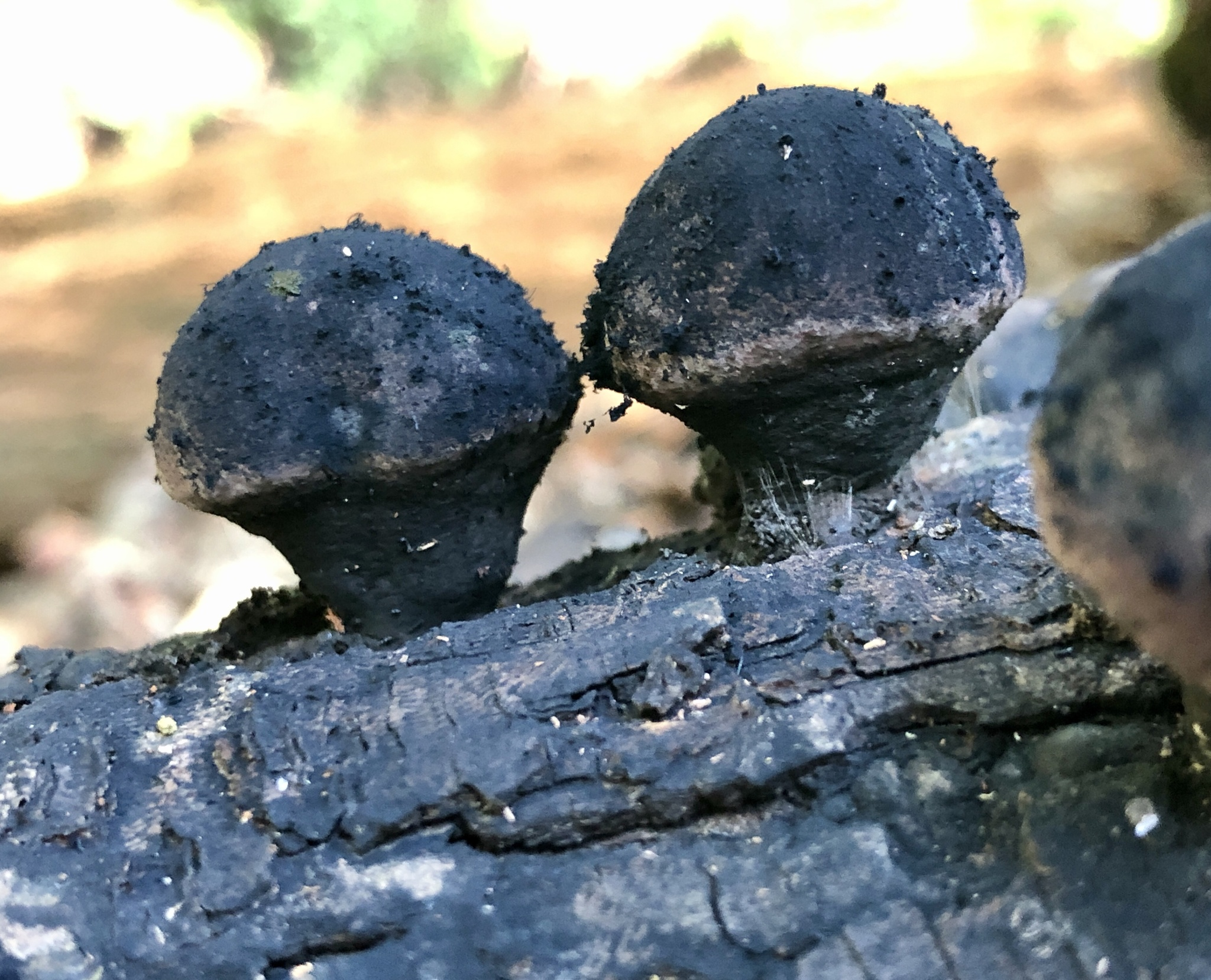
- Daldinia childiae

Scientific classification
- Kingdom: Fungi
- Division: Ascomycota
- Class: Sordariomycetes
- Subclass: Xylariomycetidae; O.E.Erikss. & Katarina Winka (1997)

Orders
- Amphisphaeriales; Delonicicolales; Xylariales

= Xylariomycetidae =

Subclass of fungi

Xylariomycetidae is a subclass of sac fungi.

== Orders ==
As accepted by Wijayawardene et al. 2020;

- Amphisphaeriales (15 families)
  - Amphisphaeriaceae (4)
  - Apiosporaceae (4)
  - Beltraniaceae (9)
  - Castanediellaceae (1)
  - Clypeophysalosporaceae (4)
  - Hyponectriaceae (17)
  - Iodosphaeriaceae (1)
  - Melogrammataceae (1)
  - Oxydothidaceae (1)
  - Phlogicylindriaceae (3)
  - Pseudomassariaceae (4)
  - Pseudosporidesmiaceae (1)
  - Pseudotruncatellaceae (1)
  - Sporocadaceae (35)
  - Vialaeaceae (1)
- Delonicicolales
  - Delonicicolaceae (2 genera)
  - Leptosilliaceae (1)
- Xylariales (ca 20 families)
  - Anungitiomycetaceae (3)
  - Barrmaeliaceae (2)
  - Cainiaceae (10)
  - Clypeosphaeriaceae (7)
  - Coniocessiaceae (2)
  - Diatrypaceae (22)
  - Fasciatisporaceae (1)
  - Graphostromataceae (5)
  - Hansfordiaceae (1)
  - Hypoxylaceae (18)
  - Induratiaceae (2)
  - Lopadostomataceae (4)
  - Microdochiaceae (3)
  - Polystigmataceae (1)
  - Nothodactylariaceae (1)
  - Requienellaceae (4)
  - Vamsapriyaceae (1)
  - Xyladictyochaetaceae (2)
  - Xylariaceae (38)
  - Zygosporiaceae (1)
