= Frondispora =

Scientific classification
- Kingdom: Fungi
- Division: Ascomycota
- Class: Sordariomycetes
- Order: Amphisphaeriales
- Family: Amphisphaeriaceae
- Genus: Frondispora; K.D. Hyde

Type species
- Frondispora bicalcarata (Ces.) K.D. Hyde

Genus of fungi

Frondispora is a genus of fungi in the family Amphisphaeriaceae. This is a monotypic genus, containing the single species Frondispora bicalcarata.
