= Oxydothis =

Scientific classification
- Kingdom: Fungi
- Division: Ascomycota
- Class: Sordariomycetes
- Order: Amphisphaeriales
- Family: Amphisphaeriaceae
- Genus: Oxydothis; Penz. & Sacc.

Type species
- Oxydothis grisea Penz. & Sacc.

Genus of fungi

Oxydothis is a genus of fungi in the family Amphisphaeriaceae; according to the 2007 Outline of Ascomycota, the placement in this family is uncertain.
