= Cainia desmazieri =

Scientific classification
- Kingdom: Fungi
- Division: Ascomycota
- Class: Sordariomycetes
- Order: Xylariales
- Family: Cainiaceae
- Genus: Cainia
- Species: C. desmazieri

Binomial name
- Cainia desmazieri C.Moreau & E.Müll. ex Krug (1977)

Synonyms
- Sphaeria incarcerata Desm. (1846); Didymosphaeria incarcerata (Desm.) Sacc. (1882); Microthelia incarcerata (Desm.) Kuntze (1898); Cainia incarcerata (Desm.) E.Müll. & Arx (1955); Cainia desmazieri C.Moreau & E.Müll. (1963)

Species of fungus

Cainia desmazieri is a species of fungus belonging to the family Cainiaceae. It was first described as a new species by Claude Moreau and Emil Müller in 1963, and then later validly published in 1978.
