= Capsulospora =

Scientific classification
- Kingdom: Fungi
- Division: Ascomycota
- Class: Sordariomycetes
- Order: Amphisphaeriales
- Family: Amphisphaeriaceae
- Genus: Capsulospora; K.D. Hyde

Type species
- Capsulospora frondicola K.D. Hyde

Genus of fungi

Capsulospora is a genus of fungi in the family Amphisphaeriaceae; according to the 2007 Outline of Ascomycota, the placement in this family is uncertain.
