= Neobroomella =

Scientific classification
- Kingdom: Fungi
- Division: Ascomycota
- Class: Sordariomycetes
- Order: Amphisphaeriales
- Family: Amphisphaeriaceae
- Genus: Neobroomella; Petr.

Type species
- Neobroomella ciliata Petr.

Genus of fungi

Neobroomella is a genus of fungi in the family Amphisphaeriaceae. This is a monotypic genus, containing the single species Neobroomella ciliata.
