= Funiliomyces =

Scientific classification
- Kingdom: Fungi
- Division: Ascomycota
- Class: Sordariomycetes
- Order: Amphisphaeriales
- Family: Amphisphaeriaceae
- Genus: Funiliomyces; Aptroot

Type species
- Funiliomyces biseptatus Aptroot

Genus of fungi

Funiliomyces is a genus of fungi in the family Amphisphaeriaceae. This is a monotypic genus, containing the single species Funiliomyces biseptatus.
