= R. indica =

R. indica may refer to:

- Raoiella indica, the red palm mite, a mite species
- Ratufa indica, the Indian giant squirrel or Malabar giant squirrel, a large-bodied diurnal, arboreal and herbivorous squirrel species
- Reticulosphaeria indica, a fungus species
- Rhaphiolepis indica, the Indian hawthorn, an evergreen shrub species

== See also ==
- Indica (disambiguation)
