= Distorimula =

Scientific classification
- Kingdom: Fungi
- Division: Ascomycota
- Class: Sordariomycetes
- Order: Amphisphaeriales
- Family: Amphisphaeriaceae
- Genus: Distorimula; San Martín, Lavín & Esqueda

Type species
- Distorimula mexicana F. San Martín, P. Lavín, Esqueda

Genus of fungi

Distorimula is a genus of fungi in the family Amphisphaeriaceae. This is a monotypic genus, containing the single species Distorimula mexicana.
