= Truncatella laurocerasi =

Scientific classification
- Kingdom: Fungi
- Division: Ascomycota
- Class: Sordariomycetes
- Order: Amphisphaeriales
- Family: Sporocadaceae
- Genus: Truncatella
- Species: T. laurocerasi

Binomial name
- Truncatella laurocerasi (Westend.) Steyaert,(1949)

Synonyms
- Pestalotia laurocerasi Westend., (1857); Pestalotia ramulosa J.F.H. Beyma, (1933); Pestalotiopsis laurocerasi (Westend.) Y.X. Chen, (1993); Truncatella ramulosa (J.F.H. Beyma) Steyaert, (1949)

Species of fungus

Truncatella laurocerasi is a pathogen the primarily infects strawberries.
