= Pestalosphaeria =

Scientific classification
- Kingdom: Fungi
- Division: Ascomycota
- Class: Sordariomycetes
- Order: Amphisphaeriales
- Family: Amphisphaeriaceae
- Genus: Pestalosphaeria; M.E. Barr

Type species
- Pestalosphaeria concentrica M.E. Barr

Genus of fungi

Pestalosphaeria is a genus of fungi in the family Amphisphaeriaceae.

The morphological characters of Pestalosphaeria comprise cylindrical asci with a J+ apical apparatus, ascospores uniseriate in the ascus, three cells, ellipsoid, and a pale dull brown color.

The genus name of Pestalosphaeria is in honour of Fortunato Pestalozza (died 1878), who was an Italian botanist and doctor who worked in Constantinople and Antalya.

The genus was circumscribed by Margaret Elizabeth Barr-Bigelow in Mycologia vol.67 on page 188 in 1975.

== Species ==
As accepted by Species Fungorum;

- Pestalosphaeria accidenta P.L. Zhu, Q.X. Ge & T. Xu (1991)
- Pestalosphaeria alpiniae P.K. Chi & S.Q. Chen (1994)
- Pestalosphaeria austroamericana Nag Raj & DiCosmo (1979)
- Pestalosphaeria hansenii Shoemaker & J.A. Simpson (1981)
- Pestalosphaeria leucospermi Samuels, E. Müll. & Petrini (1987)

Former species

- Pestalosphaeria concentrica M.E. Barr (1975) = Pestalotiopsis guepinii); Pestalotiopsidaceae
- Pestalosphaeria elaeidis (C. Booth & J.S. Robertson) Aa (1976) = Pseudopestalotiopsis elaeidis); Pestalotiopsidaceae
- Pestalosphaeria eugeniae P.K. Chi & S.M. Lin (1994) = Pestalotiopsis eugeniae); Pestalotiopsidaceae
- Pestalosphaeria gubae Tak. Kobay., Ishihara & Yas. Ono (2001) = Pestalotiopsis neglecta); Pestalotiopsidaceae
- Pestalosphaeria jinggangensis P.L. Zhu, T. Xu & Q.X. Ge (1990) = Pestalotiopsis podocarpi); Pestalotiopsidaceae
- Pestalosphaeria maculiformans Marinc., M.J. Wingf. & Crous (2008) = Pestalotiopsis maculiformans); Pestalotiopsidaceae
- Pestalosphaeria varia Nag Raj (1985) = Pestalotiopsis besseyi); Pestalotiopsidaceae
