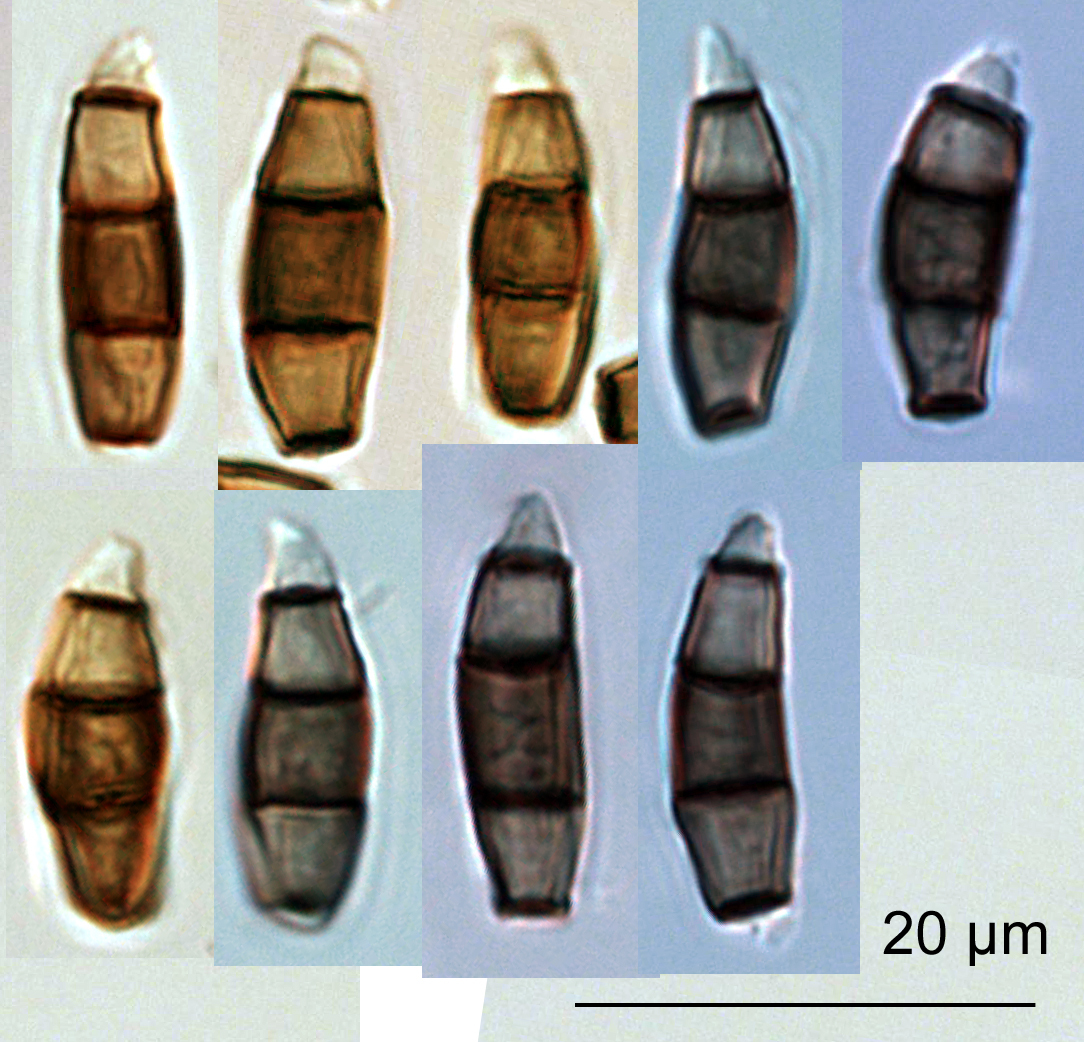

Scientific classification
- Domain: Eukaryota
- Kingdom: Fungi
- Division: Ascomycota
- Class: Sordariomycetes
- Order: Amphisphaeriales
- Family: Bartaliniaceae
- Genus: Truncatella
- Species: T. hartigii

Binomial name
- Truncatella hartigii (Tubeuf) Steyaert 1949

Synonyms
- Pestalotia hartigii Tubeuf (1888)

= Truncatella hartigii =

Species of fungus

Truncatella hartigii is a species of parasitic fungus in the family Bartaliniaceae, first described by Karl von Tubeuf in 1888, and given its current name by René Léopold Steyaert in 1949. It is a parasite of pine needles. It is morphologically similar to Pestalotiopsis funerea with differences in their conidia. It shows significant antibacterial activity, especially against Enterococcus faecalis.
