= Mukhakesa =

Scientific classification
- Kingdom: Fungi
- Division: Ascomycota
- Class: Sordariomycetes
- Order: Amphisphaeriales
- Family: Amphisphaeriaceae
- Genus: Mukhakesa; Udaiyan & Hosag.

Type species
- Mukhakesa lignicola Udaiyan & V.S. Hosag.

Genus of fungi

Mukhakesa is a genus of fungi in the family Amphisphaeriaceae. This is a monotypic genus, containing the single species Mukhakesa lignicola.
