= Urosporella =

Scientific classification
- Kingdom: Fungi
- Division: Ascomycota
- Class: Sordariomycetes
- Order: Amphisphaeriales
- Family: Amphisphaeriaceae
- Genus: Urosporella; G.F. Atk.

Type species
- Urosporella americana G.F. Atk.

Genus of fungi

Urosporella is a genus of fungi in the family Amphisphaeriaceae; according to the 2003 Outline of Ascomycota, the placement in this family is uncertain.
