= Ceriophora =

Scientific classification
- Kingdom: Fungi
- Division: Ascomycota
- Class: Sordariomycetes
- Order: Amphisphaeriales
- Family: Amphisphaeriaceae
- Genus: Ceriophora; Höhn.

Genus of fungi

Ceriophora is a genus of fungi in the family Amphisphaeriaceae.
