= Ommatomyces =

Scientific classification
- Kingdom: Fungi
- Division: Ascomycota
- Class: Sordariomycetes
- Order: Amphisphaeriales
- Family: Amphisphaeriaceae
- Genus: Ommatomyces; Kohlm., Volkm.-Kohlm. & O.E. Erikss.

Type species
- Ommatomyces coronatus Kohlm., Volkm.-Kohlm. & O.E. Erikss.

Genus of fungi

Ommatomyces is a genus of fungi in the family Amphisphaeriaceae.
