= Paracainiella =

Scientific classification
- Kingdom: Fungi
- Division: Ascomycota
- Class: Sordariomycetes
- Order: Amphisphaeriales
- Family: Amphisphaeriaceae
- Genus: Paracainiella; Lar. N. Vasiljeva

Type species
- Paracainiella dryadis Lar.N. Vassiljeva

Genus of fungi

Paracainiella is a genus of fungi in the family Amphisphaeriaceae. This is a monotypic genus, containing the single species Paracainiella dryadis.
