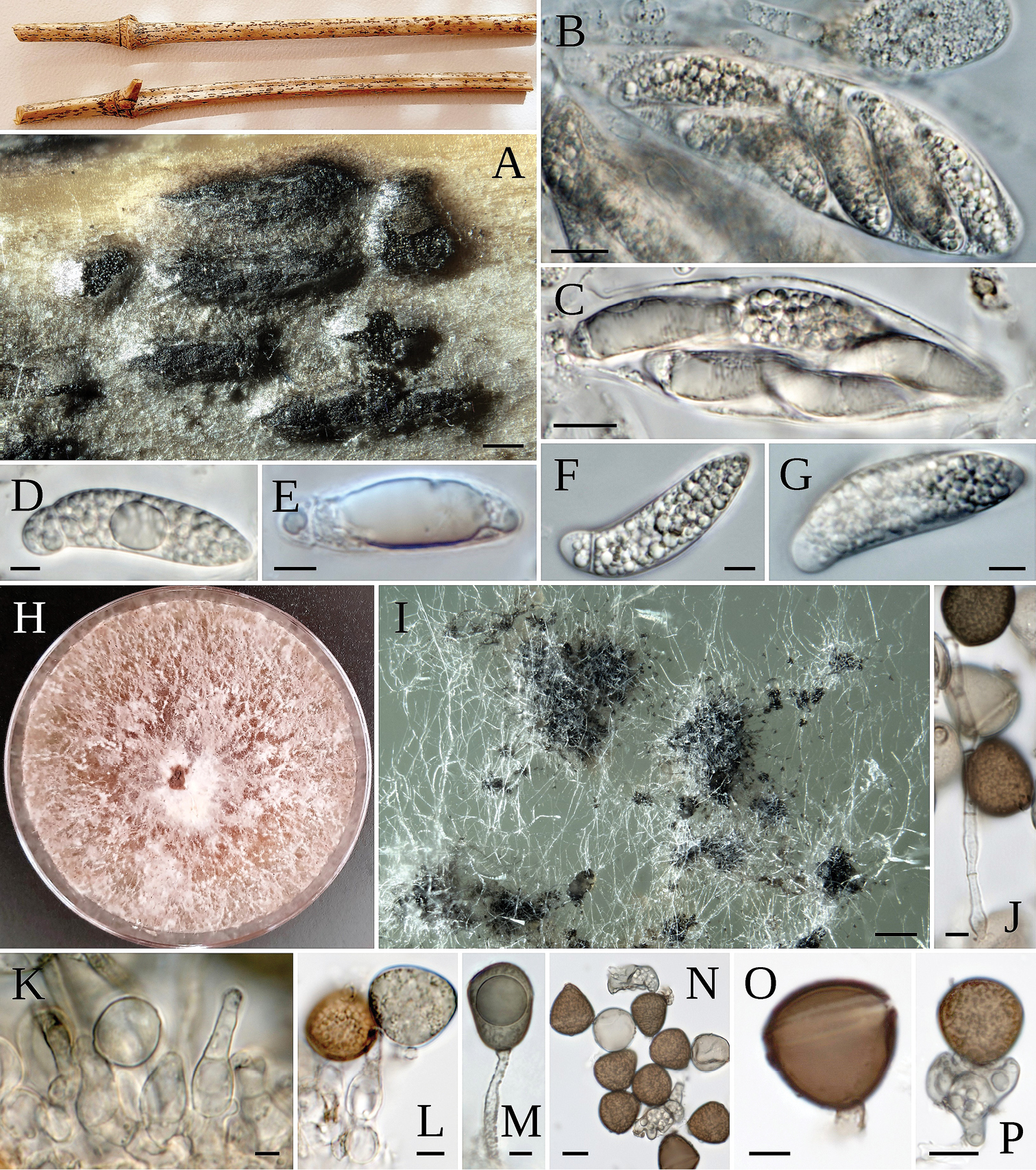
- Arthrinium hysterinum

Scientific classification
- Domain: Eukaryota
- Kingdom: Fungi
- Division: Ascomycota
- Class: Sordariomycetes
- Order: Amphisphaeriales
- Family: Apiosporaceae
- Genus: Arthrinium; Kunze (1817)

Type species
- Arthrinium caricicola Kunze (1817)

Synonyms
- Camptoum Link & L. (1824); Gonatosporium Corda (1839); Goniosporium Link (1809); Microtypha Speg. (1911); Phaeoharziella Loubière (1924); Pseudobasidium Tengwall (1924); Racemosporium Moreau & V. Moreau (1941); Rhinocephalum Kamyschko (1961); Sporophleum Nees ex Link, L. (1824); Tureenia J.G.Hall (1915)

= Arthrinium =

Genus of fungi

Arthrinium is a genus of minute disease-causing fungi which belong to the family Apiosporaceae and which are parasitic on flowering plants such as sedges. These fungi have an anamorphic life cycle stage where spores are produced asexually in structures called conidia and a teleomorphic stage where sexual spores are produced in asci.

Historically the name Arthrinum represented the anamorph form and a different genus name was used for the teleomorph form; however after a decision in 2011 one name or the other has to be selected as the current name for all cases. The corresponding teleomorph-derived name varies from species to species of Arthrinium but most commonly it is Apiospora, for instance the teleomorph synonym of the species Arthrinium balearicum is Apiospora balearica. There is a tendency to prefer the teleomorph name and the genus name Arthrinium is not the current official one for all species.

The genus was first described by Gustav Kunze in 1817.

The genus has a cosmopolitan distribution.

Arthrinium caricola and A. saccharicola produce the mitochondrial toxin 3-nitropropanoic acid.

Selected species:

- Arthrinium caricicola
- Arthrinium carinatum
- Arthrinium phaeospermum
- Arthrinium puccinioides
- Arthrinium sphaerospermum
- Arthrinium saccharicola
