= Dyrithium =

Scientific classification
- Kingdom: Fungi
- Division: Ascomycota
- Class: Sordariomycetes
- Order: Amphisphaeriales
- Family: Amphisphaeriaceae
- Genus: Dyrithium; M.E. Barr

Type species
- Dyrithium lividum (Fr.) M.E. Barr (1994)

Genus of fungi

Dyrithium is a genus of fungi in the family Amphisphaeriaceae; according to the 2007 Outline of Ascomycota, the placement in this family is uncertain. This is a monotypic genus, containing the single species Dyrithium lividum.
