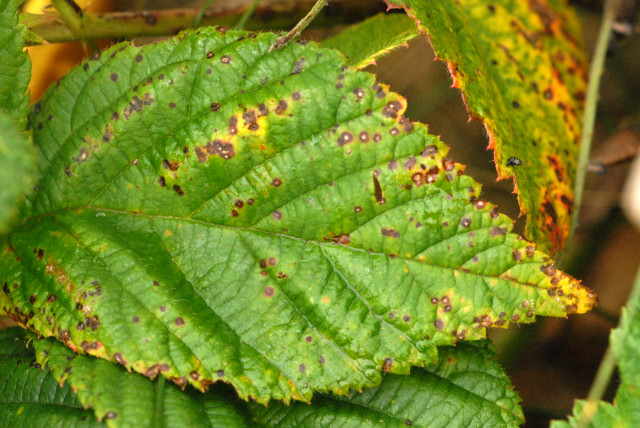
- Discostroma.corticola

Scientific classification
- Kingdom: Fungi
- Division: Ascomycota
- Class: Sordariomycetes
- Order: Amphisphaeriales
- Family: Amphisphaeriaceae
- Genus: Discostroma; Clem.

Type species
- Discostroma rehmii (Schnabl) Clem.

Species
- Species include: Discostroma corticola

= Discostroma =

Genus of fungi

Discostroma is a genus of fungi in the family Amphisphaeriaceae.
