= Truncatella =

Truncatella may refer to:

- Truncatella (gastropod), a genus of shoreline gastropods
- Truncatella (fungus), a genus of plant pathogens
