= Flagellosphaeria =

Scientific classification
- Domain: Eukaryota
- Kingdom: Fungi
- Division: Ascomycota
- Class: Sordariomycetes
- Order: Amphisphaeriales
- Family: Amphisphaeriaceae
- Genus: Flagellosphaeria; Aptroot (1995)

Type species
- Flagellosphaeria polytrichospora (M.T.Lucas & Sousa da Câmara) Aptroot (1995)

Genus of fungi

Flagellosphaeria is a genus of fungi in the family Amphisphaeriaceae. This is a monotypic genus, containing the single species Flagellosphaeria polytrichospora. The genus was proposed in 1995 by the Dutch mycologist André Aptroot in 1995.
