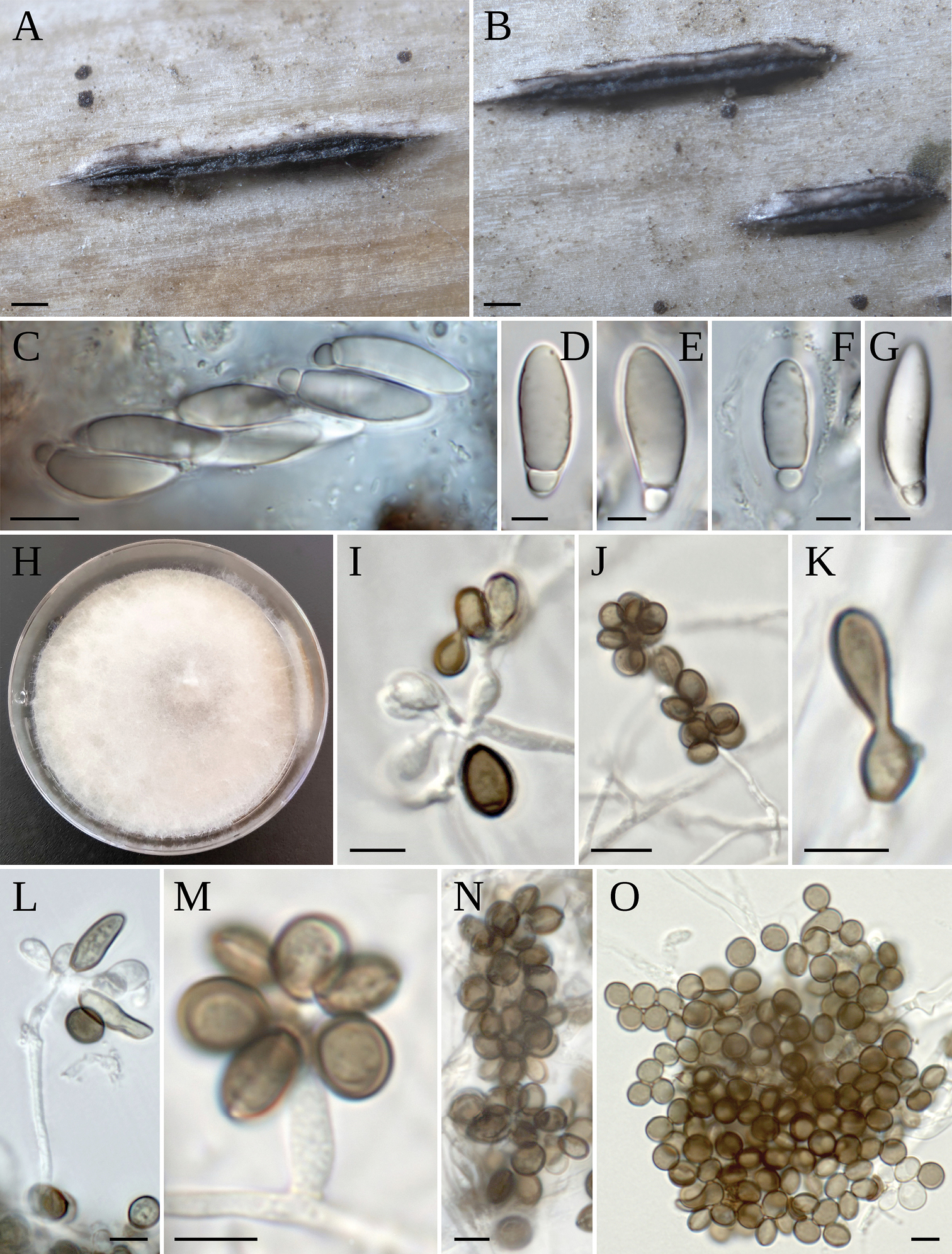
- Apiospora italica

Scientific classification
- Kingdom: Fungi
- Division: Ascomycota
- Class: Sordariomycetes
- Order: Amphisphaeriales
- Family: Apiosporaceae
- Genus: Apiospora; Sacc.

Type species
- Apiospora montagnei Sacc.

= Apiospora =

Genus of fungi

Apiospora is a genus of fungi which cause plant diseases. It gives its name to the family Apiosporaceae, which contains a number of other genera. This is historically a name for the teleomorph (sexual) life-cycle stage of the fungus; for some species the corresponding anamorph name is Arthrinium.

== Species ==
As accepted by Species Fungorum;

- Apiospora aberrans (Syd. & P. Syd.) Sacc. (1928)
- Apiospora acutiapica (Senan. & K.D. Hyde) X.G. Tian & Tibpromma (2021)
- Apiospora aquatica (Z.L. Luo, K.D. Hyde & H.Y. Su) Pintos & P. Alvarado (2021)
- Apiospora arundinis (Corda) Pintos & P. Alvarado (2021)
- Apiospora aurea (Calvo & Guarro) Pintos & P. Alvarado (2021)
- Apiospora balearica (Pintos & P. Alvarado) Pintos & P. Alvarado (2021)
- Apiospora bambusicola (X. Tang, K.D. Hyde & J.C. Kang) X.G. Tian & Tibpromma (2021)
- Apiospora biserialis (Y. Feng & Z.Y. Liu) X.G. Tian & Tibpromma (2021)
- Apiospora buddlejae Sousa da Câmara & A.T. Vasconc. (1955)
- Apiospora camarae M.T. Lucas (1956)
- Apiospora camelliae-sinensis (M. Wang, F. Liu & L. Cai) Pintos & P. Alvarado (2021)
- Apiospora camptospora Penz. & Sacc. (1897)
- Apiospora chiangraiense X.G. Tian & Tibpromma (2021)
- Apiospora chilensis Speg. (1910)
- Apiospora chromolaenae (Mapook & K.D. Hyde) Pintos & P. Alvarado (2021)
- Apiospora cordylines (T.Z. Chen, Yong Wang bis & K.D. Hyde) X.G. Tian & Tibpromma (2021)
- Apiospora curvispora (Speg.) Rehm (1913)
- Apiospora cyclobalanopsidis (Y. Feng & Jian K. Liu) X.G. Tian & Tibpromma (2021)
- Apiospora descalsii (Pintos & P. Alvarado) Pintos & P. Alvarado (2021)
- Apiospora deschampsiae E. Müll. (1992)
- Apiospora dichotomanthi (M. Wang & L. Cai) Pintos & P. Alvarado (2021)
- Apiospora esporlensis (Pintos & P. Alvarado) Pintos & P. Alvarado (2021)
- Apiospora euphorbiae (M.B. Ellis) X.G. Tian & Tibpromma (2021)
- Apiospora gaoyouensis (C.M. Tian & N. Jiang) Pintos & P. Alvarado (2021)
- Apiospora garethjonesii (D.Q. Dai & H.B. Jiang) Pintos & P. Alvarado (2021)
- Apiospora gelatinosa (Y. Feng & Z.Y. Liu) X.G. Tian & Tibpromma (2021)
- Apiospora guiyangensis Samarak., Jian K. Liu & K.D. Hyde (2022)
- Apiospora guizhouensis (M. Wang & L. Cai) Pintos & P. Alvarado (2021)
- Apiospora hispanica (Larrondo & Calvo) Pintos & P. Alvarado (2021)
- Apiospora hydei (Crous) Pintos & P. Alvarado (2021)
- Apiospora hyphopodii (D.Q. Dai & K.D. Hyde) Pintos & P. Alvarado (2021)
- Apiospora hysterina (Sacc.) Pintos & P. Alvarado (2021)
- Apiospora iberica (Pintos & P. Alvarado) Pintos & P. Alvarado (2021)
- Apiospora imperatae (Rehm) Bat. & A.F. Vital (1957)
- Apiospora indica Theiss. & Syd. (1915)
- Apiospora intestini (Kajale, Sonawane & Roh. Sharma) Pintos & P. Alvarado (2021)
- Apiospora italica (Pintos & P. Alvarado) Pintos & P. Alvarado (2021)
- Apiospora jatrophae (R. Sharma, G. Kulk. & Shouche) Pintos & P. Alvarado (2021)
- Apiospora jiangxiensis (M. Wang & L. Cai) Pintos & P. Alvarado (2021)
- Apiospora kogelbergensis (Crous) Pintos & P. Alvarado (2021)
- Apiospora liliacearum Petr. (1955)
- Apiospora locuta-pollinis (F. Liu & L. Cai) Pintos & P. Alvarado (2021)
- Apiospora longistroma (D.Q. Dai & K.D. Hyde) Pintos & P. Alvarado (2021)
- Apiospora lonicerae Tranzschel (1939)
- Apiospora luzonensis Henn. (1908)
- Apiospora malaysiana (Crous) Pintos & P. Alvarado (2021)
- Apiospora marii (Larrondo & Calvo) Pintos & P. Alvarado (2021)
- Apiospora mediterranea (Larrondo & Calvo) Pintos & P. Alvarado (2021)
- Apiospora minutispora (K. Das, S.Y. Lee & H.Y. Jung) X.G. Tian, K.D. Hyde & Tibpromma (2021)
- Apiospora montagnei Sacc. (1875)
- Apiospora mori (Tennakoon, C.H. Kuo & K.D. Hyde) Monkai & Phookamsak (2022)
- Apiospora mukdahanensis Monkai & Phookamsak (2022)
- Apiospora multiloculata J.Y. Zhang, Y.Z. Lu & K.D. Hyde (2022)
- Apiospora muroiana I. Hino & Katum. (1960)
- Apiospora myrtincola Rehm (1907)
- Apiospora mytilomorpha (Bhat & W.B. Kendr.) Pintos & P. Alvarado (2021)
- Apiospora neobambusae Pintos & P. Alvarado (2021)
- Apiospora neochinensis Pintos & P. Alvarado (2021)
- Apiospora neogarethjonesii (D.Q. Dai & K.D. Hyde) Pintos & P. Alvarado (2021)
- Apiospora neosubglobosa (D.Q. Dai & H.B. Jiang) Pintos & P. Alvarado (2021)
- Apiospora obovata (M. Wang & L. Cai) Pintos & P. Alvarado (2021)
- Apiospora ovata (Crous) Pintos & P. Alvarado (2021)
- Apiospora pachyspora Rehm (1901)
- Apiospora paraphaeosperma (Senan. & K.D. Hyde) Pintos & P. Alvarado (2021)
- Apiospora petiolicola Kirschst. (1936)
- Apiospora phragmitis (Crous) Pintos & P. Alvarado (2021)
- Apiospora phyllostachydicola I. Hino & Katum. (1964)
- Apiospora phyllostachydis (C.L. Yang, X.L. Xu & K.D. Hyde) Pintos & P. Alvarado (2021)
- Apiospora piptatheri (Pintos & P. Alvarado) Pintos & P. Alvarado (2021)
- Apiospora pseudoparenchymatica (M. Wang & L. Cai) Pintos & P. Alvarado (2021)
- Apiospora pseudorasikravindrae (Senan. & K.D. Hyde) X.G. Tian & Tibpromma (2021)
- Apiospora pseudosinensis (Crous) Pintos & P. Alvarado (2021)
- Apiospora pseudospegazzinii (Crous) Pintos & Alvarado (2021)
- Apiospora pterosperma (Cooke & Massee) Pintos & P. Alvarado (2021)
- Apiospora qinlingensis (C.M. Tian & N. Jiang) Pintos & P. Alvarado (2021)
- Apiospora rasikravindrae (Shiv M. Singh, L.S. Yadav, P.N. Singh, Rah. Sharma & S.K. Singh) Pintos & P. Alvarado (2021)
- Apiospora rottboelliae (Rehm) Höhn. (1919)
- Apiospora rubi-fruticosi Severini (1913)
- Apiospora rubi-ulmifolii Bertault (1961)
- Apiospora sacchari (Speg.) Pintos & P. Alvarado (2021)
- Apiospora saccharicola (F. Stevens) Pintos & P. Alvarado (2021)
- Apiospora sasae Crous & R.K. Schumach. (2021)
- Apiospora septata (Y. Feng & Jian K. Liu) X.G. Tian & Tibpromma (2021)
- Apiospora serenensis (Larrondo & Calvo) Pintos & P. Alvarado (2021)
- Apiospora setariae (C.M. Tian & N. Jiang) X.G. Tian & Tibpromma (2021)
- Apiospora setostroma (H.B. Jiang, K.D. Hyde & Phookamsak) Pintos & P. Alvarado (2021)
- Apiospora shiraiana (P. Syd.) Hara (1954)
- Apiospora siamicola Hidayat & K.D. Hyde (2007)
- Apiospora sichuanensis Samarak., Jian K. Liu & K.D. Hyde (2022)
- Apiospora sorghi (J.D.P. Bezerra, C.M. Gonçalves & C.M. Souza-Motta) X.G. Tian & Tibpromma (2021)
- Apiospora sphaerosperma (Pers.) Pintos & P. Alvarado (2021)
- Apiospora spinulosa Petr. (1953)
- Apiospora stipae Crous & R.K. Schumach. (2021)
- Apiospora subglobosa (D.Q. Dai & K.D. Hyde) Pintos & P. Alvarado (2021)
- Apiospora subrosea (M. Wang & L. Cai) Pintos & P. Alvarado (2021)
- Apiospora thailandica (D.Q. Dai & K.D. Hyde) Pintos & P. Alvarado (2021)
- Apiospora tropica Y.R. Sun, Yong Wang bis & K.D. Hyde (2022)
- Apiospora vietnamensis (Hol.-Jech.) Pintos & P. Alvarado (2021)
- Apiospora xenocordella (Crous) Pintos & P. Alvarado (2021)
- Apiospora yerbae Speg. (1908)
- Apiospora yunnana (D.Q. Dai & K.D. Hyde) Pintos & P. Alvarado (2021)

Former species;

- A. apiospora (Durieu & Mont.) Underwood & Earle (1897) = Apiospora montagnei, Apiosporaceae
- A. apiospora var. minor (Berl. & F. Sacc.) Henn. (1914) = Apiospora montagnei, Apiosporaceae
- A. bambusae (Turconi) Sivan. (1983) = Apiospora hysterina, Apiosporaceae
- A. carbonacea Rehm (1916) = Pteridiospora javanica, Dothideomycetes
- A. chondrospora (Ces.) Sacc. & D. Sacc. (1905) = Pseudomassaria chondrospora, Pseudomassariaceae
- A. controversa Starbäck (1905) = Stigmochora controversa, Phyllachoraceae
- A. coryphae (Rehm) Sacc. (1928) = Appendicospora coryphae, Apiosporaceae
- A. curvispora var. rottboelliae Rehm (1913) = Apiospora rottboelliae, Apiosporaceae
- A. lloydii (P. Crouan & H. Crouan) Sacc. (1882) = Phyllachora bromi, Phyllachoraceae
- A. melastomata (Höhn.) Teng (1996) = Rehmiodothis osbeckiae, Phyllachoraceae
- A. oryzae (H.J. Huds.) Arx (1974) = Nigrospora oryzae, Sordariomycetes
- A. paulliniae Rehm (1901) = Anisomyces nectrioides, Gnomoniaceae
- A. polypori Ellis & Everh. (1892) = Anisomeridium polypori, Monoblastiaceae
- A. rubi-fruticosi f. minuscula Dias & Sousa da Câmara (1955) = Apiospora rubi-fruticosi, Apiosporaceae
- A. sepincoliformis (De Not.) Traverso (1907) = Pseudomassaria sepincoliformis, Pseudomassariaceae
- A. setosa Samuels, McKenzie & D.E. Buchanan (1981) = Apiospora hysterina, Apiosporaceae
- A. sinensis K.D. Hyde, J. Fröhl. & Joanne E. Taylor (1998) = Arthrinium sinense, Apiosporaceae
- A. striola var. minor Berl. & F. Sacc. (1889) = Apiospora montagnei, Apiosporaceae
- A. tintinnabula Samuels, McKenzie & D.E. Buchanan (1981) = Apiospora hysterina, Apiosporaceae
- A. urticae Rehm (1882) = Apiosporella urticae, Apiosporaceae
- A. veneta (Sacc. & Speg.) Sacc. ex Kleb. (1902) = Apiognomonia veneta, Gnomoniaceae
