= Appendicospora =

Scientific classification
- Kingdom: Fungi
- Division: Ascomycota
- Class: Sordariomycetes
- Order: Amphisphaeriales
- Family: Apiosporaceae
- Genus: Appendicospora; K.D. Hyde

Type species
- Appendicospora coryphae (Rehm) K.D. Hyde

Species
- A. coryphae A. hongkongensis

Genus of fungi

Appendicospora is a genus of fungi in the family Apiosporaceae.

== Species ==
- Appendicospora coryphae (Hyde, 1995)
- Appendicospora hongkongensis (Yanna et al., 1997)
