= Blogiascospora =

Scientific classification
- Kingdom: Fungi
- Division: Ascomycota
- Class: Sordariomycetes
- Order: Amphisphaeriales
- Family: Amphisphaeriaceae
- Genus: Blogiascospora; Shoemaker, E. Müll. & Morgan-Jone

Type species
- Blogiascospora marginata (Fuckel) Shoemaker, E. Müll. & Morgan-Jones

Genus of fungi

Blogiascospora is a genus of fungi in the family Amphisphaeriaceae. This is a monotypic genus, containing the single species Blogiascospora marginata.
