= Urosporellopsis =

Scientific classification
- Kingdom: Fungi
- Division: Ascomycota
- Class: Sordariomycetes
- Order: Amphisphaeriales
- Family: Amphisphaeriaceae
- Genus: Urosporellopsis; W.H. Hsieh, C.Y. Chen & Sivan.

Type species
- Urosporellopsis taiwanensis W.H. Hsieh, Chi Y. Chen & Sivan.

Genus of fungi

Urosporellopsis is a genus of fungi in the family Amphisphaeriaceae. This is a monotypic genus, containing the single species Urosporellopsis taiwanensis.
