= Bartaliniaceae =

Scientific classification
- Kingdom: Fungi
- Division: Ascomycota
- Class: Sordariomycetes
- Order: Amphisphaeriales
- Family: Bartaliniaceae; Wijayaw., Maharachch., P.M. Kirk & K.D. Hyde

Family of fungi

Bartaliniaceae is a family of fungi in the order Amphisphaeriales. As of May 2025, the family is not accepted by Index Fungorum.

== Genera ==
There are seven accepted genera under the family Bartaliniaceae:

- Bartalinia
- Broomella
- Hyalotia
- Hyalotiella
- Pestalozzina
- Truncatella
- Zetiasplona
