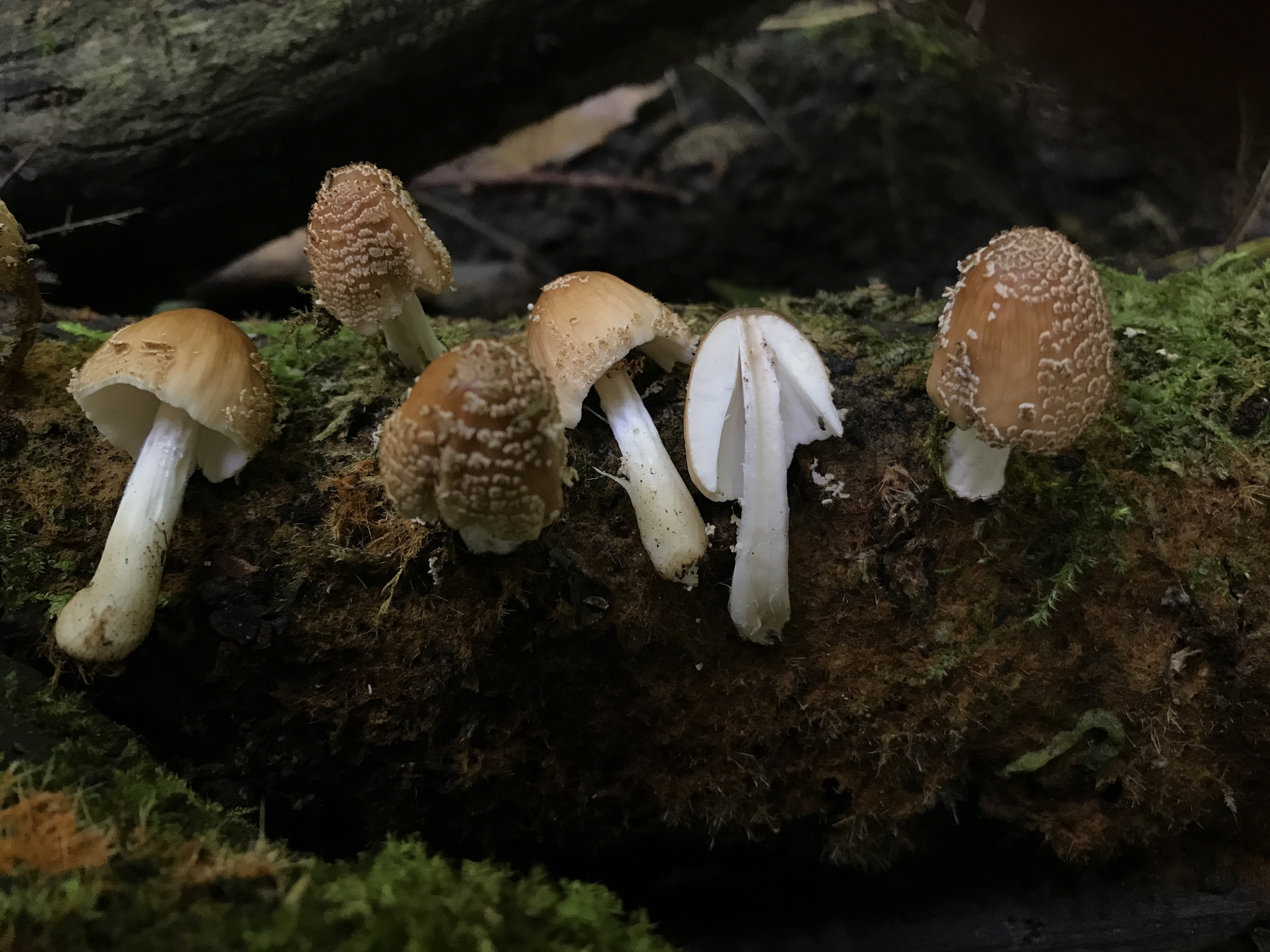

Scientific classification
- Kingdom: Fungi
- Division: Basidiomycota
- Class: Agaricomycetes
- Order: Agaricales
- Family: Psathyrellaceae
- Genus: Coprinellus
- Species: C. radians

Binomial name
- Coprinellus radians (Desm.) Vilgalys, Hopple & Jacq. Johnson

= Coprinellus radians =

Species of fungus

Coprinellus radians is a species of mushroom in the family Psathyrellaceae. First described as Agaricus radians by the mycologist John Baptiste Henri Joseph Desmazières in 1828, it was later transferred to the genus Coprinellus in 2001.

== Ecology ==
Coprinellus radians has been shown to promote seed germination of the orchid Cremastra appendiculata under laboratory conditions.

== Genomics ==
A telomere-to-telomere genome assembly of Coprinellus radians was published in 2026. The assembly spans approximately 41.1 Mb across 13 gap-free chromosomes, with telomeric repeats at both ends of each chromosome.. It has a BUSCO completeness score of 96.4% and contains 12,417 predicted protein-coding genes.
