= Amphisphaerella =

Scientific classification
- Kingdom: Fungi
- Division: Ascomycota
- Class: Sordariomycetes
- Order: Amphisphaeriales
- Family: Amphisphaeriaceae
- Genus: Amphisphaerella (Sacc.) Kirschst.

Type species
- Amphisphaerella amphisphaerioides (Sacc. & Speg.) Kirschst.

Genus of fungi

Amphisphaerella is a genus of fungi in the family Amphisphaeriaceae. It contains eleven species.

== Species ==
Amphisphaerella contains the following species:

- Amphisphaerella alpigena (Fuckel) Lar.N. Vassiljeva
- Amphisphaerella amphisphaerioides (Sacc. & Speg.) Kirschst.
- Amphisphaerella arausiaca (Fabre) Kirschst.
- Amphisphaerella canicollis (P. Karst.) Kirschst.
- Amphisphaerella deceptiva M.E. Barr
- Amphisphaerella dispersella (Nyl.) O.E. Erikss.
- Amphisphaerella erikssonii Math.
- Amphisphaerella lonicericola (Z.Q. Yuan & Z.Y. Zhao) Lar.N. Vassiljeva
- Amphisphaerella mycophila (Fr.) Kirschst.
- Amphisphaerella vaga (Niessl) O.E. Erikss.
- Amphisphaerella whitmanensis J.D. Rogers
