= Cainia =

Scientific classification
- Domain: Eukaryota
- Kingdom: Fungi
- Division: Ascomycota
- Class: Sordariomycetes
- Order: Xylariales
- Family: Cainiaceae
- Genus: Cainia; Arx & E.Müll. (1955)

Type species
- Cainia graminis (Niessl) Arx & E.Müll. (1955)

Species
- Cainia desmazieri Cainia graminis Cainia passerinii

Genus of fungi

Cainia is a genus of fungi in the family Cainiaceae. The genus, widespread in temperate regions, contains three species that grow on grasses.
