= Reticulosphaeria =

Scientific classification
- Kingdom: Fungi
- Division: Ascomycota
- Class: Sordariomycetes
- Order: Amphisphaeriales
- Family: Amphisphaeriaceae
- Genus: Reticulosphaeria; Sivan. & Bahekar

Type species
- Reticulosphaeria indica Sivan. & Bahekar

Genus of fungi

Reticulosphaeria is a genus of fungi in the family Amphisphaeriaceae; according to the 2007 Outline of Ascomycota, the placement in this family is uncertain. This is a monotypic genus, containing the single species Reticulosphaeria indica.
