= Amphisphaeria =

Scientific classification
- Kingdom: Fungi
- Division: Ascomycota
- Class: Sordariomycetes
- Order: Amphisphaeriales
- Family: Amphisphaeriaceae
- Genus: Amphisphaeria; Ces. & De Not.

Type species
- Amphisphaeria umbrina (Fr.) De Not.

Genus of fungi

Amphisphaeria is a genus of fungi in the family Amphisphaeriaceae.
