= Arecophila =

Scientific classification
- Kingdom: Fungi
- Division: Ascomycota
- Class: Sordariomycetes
- Order: Xylariales
- Family: Cainiaceae
- Genus: Arecophila; K.D. Hyde

Type species
- Arecophila gulubiicola K.D. Hyde

Genus of fungi

Arecophila is a genus of fungi in the family Cainiaceae.
