= Brian Charles Sutton =

British botanist, phytopathologist and mycologist

Brian Charles Sutton (born 1938 in Oxford, Oxfordshire, UK) is a British botanist, phytopathologist, mycologist, known as one of the world's leading experts in coelomycete classification. He was the president of the British Mycological Society for the academic year 1985–1986.

== Biography ==
Sutton graduated in 1959 with a B.Sc. in botany from the Imperial College London, which was part of the University of London (until July 2007). In August 1959 he was appointed Assistant Mycologist at Kew's Commonwealth Mycological Institute (renamed in 1986 the International Mycological Institute and in 1998 merged into CAB International). There his mentors were Edmund William Mason (1890–1975), Frederick Claude Deighton (1903–1992), and Martin Beazor Ellis (1911–1996). His superiors offered Sutton the choice of specialty as either rusts or coelomycetes. He chose the latter and was registered at Imperial College London for a Ph.D. on the genus Colletotrichum. In 1964 he completed his doctorate in mycology and phytopathology. He was employed at the mycological institute for his entire career, with a long sabbatical leave from 1965 to 1969 working as a research scientist in Winnipeg for Canada's Department of Forestry and a sabbatical year in 1986 in Australia. At the International Institute of Mycology, Sutton was appointed in 1976 Principal Mycologist and in 1990 Deputy Director. In 1995, partly out of concern for his wife's failing eyesight, he took early retirement from the institute.

His 696-page book The Coelomycetes (Commonwealth Mycological Institute, 1980) is an important reference, which was a major advance for coelomycete identification. He served as an editor for the Transactions of the British Mycological Society. The Natural History Museum, London has some of the specimens collected by Sutton.

== See also ==
- Sarcostroma

== Selected publications ==
=== Articles ===
- Rawlinson, C.J.; Sutton, B.C.; Muthyalu, G. (1978). "Taxonomy and biology of Pyrenopeziza brassicae sp.nov. (Cylindrosporium concentricum), a pathogen of winter oilseed rape (Brassica napus ssp. oleifera)". Transactions of the British Mycological Society. 71 (3): 425–439. doi:10.1016/S0007-1536(78)80070-9. See (Pyrenopeziza brassicae and Brassica napus.)
- Minter, D.W.; Kirk, P.M.; Sutton, B.C. (1982). "Holoblastic phialides". Transactions of the British Mycological Society. 79: 75–93. doi:10.1016/S0007-1536(82)80193-9. (See phialide.)
- Sutton, B.C.; Dyko, B.J. (1989). "Revision of Hendersonula". Mycological Research. 93 (4): 466–488. doi:10.1016/S0953-7562(89)80040-1. (Hendersonula toruloidea is a synonym for Neoscytalidium dimidiatum.)
- Fisher, P. J.; Petrini, O.; Petrini, L. E.; Sutton, B. C. (1994). "Fungal endophytes from the leaves and twigs of Quercus ilex L. From England, Majorca and Switzerland". New Phytologist. 127 (1): 133–137. doi:10.1111/j.1469-8137.1994.tb04267.x. PMID 33874406. (See Quercus ilex.)
- Fisher, P. J.; Graf, F.; Petrini, L. E.; Sutton, B. C.; Wookey, P. A. (1995). "Fungal endophytes of Dryas octopetala from a high arctic polar semidesert and from the Swiss Alps". Mycologia. 87 (3): 319–323. doi:10.1080/00275514.1995.12026536. (See Dryas octopetala.)
- Lodge, D. Jean; Fisher, P. J.; Sutton, B. C. (1996). "Endophytic fungi of Manilkara bidentata leaves in Puerto Rico". Mycologia. 88 (5): 733–738. doi:10.1080/00275514.1996.12026710. (See Manilkara bidentata.)
- Gange, Alan C.; Dey, Soma; Currie, Amanda F.; Sutton, Brian C. (2007). "Site- and species-specific differences in endophyte occurrence in two herbaceous plants". Journal of Ecology. 95 (4): 614–622. doi:10.1111/j.1365-2745.2007.01245.x. S2CID 83767193.
- Wearn, James A.; Sutton, Brian C.; Morley, Neil J.; Gange, Alan C. (2012-07-12). "Species and organ specificity of fungal endophytes in herbaceous grassland plants". Journal of Ecology. 100 (5). Wiley: 1085–1092. doi:10.1111/j.1365-2745.2012.01997.x. ISSN 0022-0477. S2CID 82097400.
- Hodgson, Susan; De Cates, Catherine; Hodgson, Joshua; Morley, Neil J.; Sutton, Brian C.; Gange, Alan C. (2014). "Vertical transmission of fungal endophytes is widespread in forbs". Ecology and Evolution. 4 (8): 1199–1208. doi:10.1002/ece3.953. PMC 4020682. PMID 24834319. (See forb.)

=== Books and monographs ===
- Sutton, Brian Charles (1971). Coelomycetes: The genus Harknessia, and similar fungi on Eucalyptus. IV; 46 pages. (See Eucalyptus. The genus Harknessia is named in honor of H. W. Harkness.)
- Sutton, B. C. (1973). Hyphomycetes from Manitoba and Saskatchewan, Canada. Kew, Surrey, UK: Commonwealth Mycological Institute. LCCN 73179995.
- Sutton, Brian C. (1980). The Coelomycetes. Fungi imperfecti with pycnidia, acervuli and stromata. Kew, Surrey, England: Commonwealth Mycological Institute. ISBN 9780851984469. LCCN 87130029. abstract
- Hawksworth, D. L.; Sutton, B. C.; Ainsworth, G. C., eds. (1983). Ainsworth & Bisby's dictionary of the fungi, including the lichens (7th ed.). Kew, Surrey: Commonwealth Mycological Institute. LCCN 87124769; with the assistance of Beryl L. Brady et al.
- Sutton, Brian C., ed. (1996). A century of mycology. Cambridge University Press. ISBN 0521570565. LCCN 96009335.
