= Neoascochyta desmazieri =

Scientific classification
- Kingdom: Fungi
- Division: Ascomycota
- Class: Dothideomycetes
- Order: Pleosporales
- Family: Didymellaceae
- Genus: Neoascochyta
- Species: N. desmazieri

Binomial name
- Neoascochyta desmazieri (Cavara) Qian Chen & L. Cai, 2015

Species of fungus

Neoascochyta desmazieri is a species of fungus belonging to the family Didymellaceae.

Synonym:

- Ascochyta desmazieri Cavara

The species is named after amateur mycologist John Baptiste Henri Joseph Desmazières.
