= Chitonospora =

Scientific classification
- Kingdom: Fungi
- Division: Ascomycota
- Class: Sordariomycetes
- Order: Amphisphaeriales
- Family: Amphisphaeriaceae
- Genus: Chitonospora; E. Bommer, M. Rousseau & Sacc.

Type species
- Chitonospora ammophila E. Bommer, M. Rousseau & Sacc.

Genus of fungi

Chitonospora is a genus of fungi in the family Amphisphaeriaceae. This is a monotypic genus, containing the single species Chitonospora ammophila.
