= Atrotorquata =

Scientific classification
- Kingdom: Fungi
- Division: Ascomycota
- Class: Sordariomycetes
- Order: Xylariales
- Family: Cainiaceae
- Genus: Atrotorquata; Kohlm. & Volkm.-Kohlm. (1993)

Type species
- Atrotorquata lineata Kohlm. & Volkm.-Kohlm. (1993)

Genus of fungi

Atrotorquata is a genus of fungi in the family Cainiaceae. The genus is monotypic, containing the single species Atrotorquata lineata, found in the US and first described in 1993.

It produces unitunicate asci and distinctive brown, two-celled ascospores that are longitudinally striate (patterned with distinct lines).
