= Cannonia australis =

Scientific classification
- Kingdom: Fungi
- Division: Ascomycota
- Class: Ascomycetes
- Order: Xylariales
- Family: Amphisphaeriaceae
- Genus: Cannonia J.E. Taylor & K.D. Hyde
- Species: C. australis

Binomial name
- Cannonia australis (Speg.) Joanne E. Taylor & K.D. Hyde

Genus of fungi

Cannonia is a genus of fungi in the family Amphisphaeriaceae. This is a monotypic genus, containing the single species Cannonia australis.
