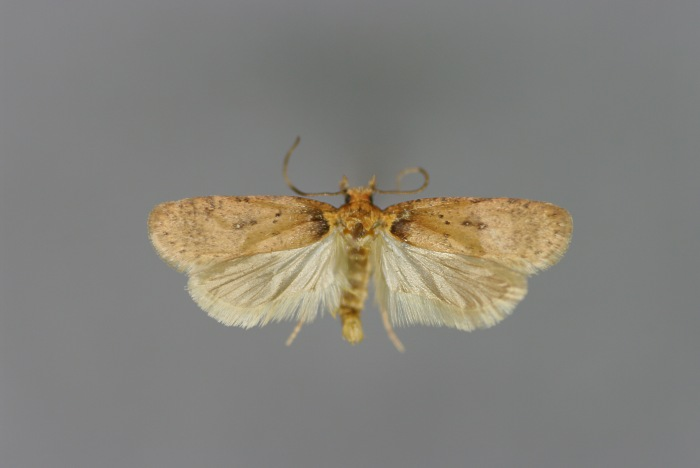

Scientific classification
- Kingdom: Animalia
- Phylum: Arthropoda
- Clade: Pancrustacea
- Class: Insecta
- Order: Lepidoptera
- Family: Depressariidae
- Genus: Agonopterix
- Species: A. alpigena

Binomial name
- Agonopterix alpigena (Frey, 1870)

Synonyms
- Depressaria alpigena Frey, 1870; Depressaria ragonoti Rebel, 1889; Depressaria sileris Pfaffenzeller, 1870; Depressaria alpigena var. salevensis Frey, 1880

= Agonopterix alpigena =

Species of moth

Agonopterix alpigena is a moth of the family Depressariidae. It is found in France, Germany, Switzerland, Austria, Italy and Croatia.

The larvae feed on the leaves of Laserpitium siler, Laserpitium latifolium and Ligusticum lucidum. The species overwinters as an adult.
