= Asteromella =

- Asteromella pistaciarum

Scientific classification
- Kingdom: Fungi
- Division: Ascomycota
- Class: Dothideomycetes
- Subclass: incertae sedis
- Genus: Asteromella; Pass. & Thüm.

Genus of fungi

Asteromella is a genus of fungi of uncertain placement within the class Dothideomycetes. It contains 236 species.

== Species ==
Asteromella contains the following species:

- Asteromella abortiva (Ellis & Kellerm.) Vanev & Aa
- Asteromella acaciae Cooke
- Asteromella acanthopanacis (Syd. & P. Syd.) Aa
- Asteromella acetosae (Sacc.) Ruszk.-Mich.
- Asteromella acorella (Sacc. & Penz.) H. Ruppr.
- Asteromella adeana Petr.
- Asteromella aesculicarpa Cooke & Massee
- Asteromella agropyri Petr.
- Asteromella allescheri (P. Syd.) Aa
- Asteromella allii-rotundi (Lobik) Aa & Vanev
- Asteromella alnicola (C. Massal.) Ruszk.-Mich.
- Asteromella alpigena (Sacc.) H. Ruppr.
- Asteromella amaryllidis (Bres.) Aa
- Asteromella ambiens (Syd. & P. Syd.) Petr.
- Asteromella americanicola (Gucevič) Vanev & Aa
- Asteromella andrewsii Petr.
- Asteromella anemonicola Aa
- Asteromella angelicae Sawada
- Asteromella angustifoliorum A.W. Ramaley
- Asteromella arbuticola (Gucevič) Aa & Vanev
- Asteromella artemisiae E. Müll.
- Asteromella aspidistrae (Oudem.) Aa
- Asteromella asteris Peck
- Asteromella astragalicola (C. Massal.) Petr.
- Asteromella aterrima Petr.
- Asteromella atronitens Petr. & Cif.
- Asteromella atropina (Vassiljevsky) Vanev & Aa
- Asteromella austriaca (Sacc.) H. Ruppr.
- Asteromella bacillaris Pass. & Beltrani
- Asteromella bacillispora (Kabát & Bubák) Aa
- Asteromella bacilloides (Dominik) Ruszk.-Mich.
- Asteromella bacteriiformis (Pass.) Petr.
- Asteromella bacterioides (Vuill.) Moesz
- Asteromella bakeri (Syd. & P. Syd.) Aa
- Asteromella baldensis (C. Massal.) H. Ruppr.
- Asteromella baphiae (Novoss.) Aa & Vanev
- Asteromella barnadesiae (Gutner) Aa & Vanev
- Asteromella bellunensis Syd.
- Asteromella bizzozeriana (C. Massal.) Aa
- Asteromella brassicina (Sacc.) H. Ruppr.
- Asteromella buphthalmi (Allesch.) Aa
- Asteromella bupleuri (Fuckel) Aa
- Asteromella burserae (Gonz. Frag. & Cif.) Syd.
- Asteromella buteae S.M. Singh 1979
- Asteromella calthae (Tranzschel) Vanev & Aa
- Asteromella campanulae-latifoliae (Dobrozr.) Aa & Vanev
- Asteromella camphorae (Gucevič) Aa & Vanev
- Asteromella caricae (C. Massal.) Aa
- Asteromella carissae (Kalchbr. & Cooke) Aa
- Asteromella carlinae Petr.
- Asteromella carniolica (W. Voss) Aa
- Asteromella carpatica Petr.
- Asteromella cedrelae Petr.
- Asteromella celtidis (Ellis & Kellerm.) Aa
- Asteromella cephalariae (G. Winter) Aa
- Asteromella cerasicola (Speg.) H. Ruppr.
- Asteromella cercidis (D. Sacc.) Aa
- Asteromella chaerophylli (C. Massal.) Petr.
- Asteromella chamaebuxi Petr.
- Asteromella cheiranthicola (Bubák & H. Zimm.) Aa
- Asteromella cicutae (Lind) Aa
- Asteromella cirsiorum (Bondartsev) Vanev & Aa
- Asteromella claytoniae Murashk.
- Asteromella clemensae Syd.
- Asteromella clethrae (P. Syd.) Aa
- Asteromella coccothrinacis Petr. & Cif.
- Asteromella cocogena Boerema, Loer. & Hamers
- Asteromella cocois Bat. & J.L. Bezerra
- Asteromella compositarum Bat., J.L. Bezerra & Poroca
- Asteromella confusa (Bubák) Petr.
- Asteromella convallariae (Cavara) Petr.
- Asteromella corcontica (Kabát & Bubák) Moesz ex Bat. & Peres
- Asteromella coriariae Petr.
- Asteromella coryphae Petr. & Syd.
- Asteromella cousiniae (Vasyag.) Aa & Vanev
- Asteromella cretica Petr.
- Asteromella curculiginis (Bond.-Mont.) Vanev & Aa
- Asteromella curvata (Golovin) Aa & Vanev
- Asteromella cylindrica (Sacc. & P. Syd.) Vanev
- Asteromella cynanchicola Petr.
- Asteromella delphinii Petr.
- Asteromella dentariae (Kabát & Bubák) H. Ruppr.
- Asteromella derridis (Henn.) Aa
- Asteromella dictamni Petr.
- Asteromella digitalis-ambiguae Arx
- Asteromella dioscoreina (Woron.) Vanev & Aa
- Asteromella dombeyae Petr.
- Asteromella doronicigena (Bubák) Petr.
- Asteromella dracaenae (Henn.) Aa
- Asteromella drymariae Syd.
- Asteromella ebuli (Fuckel) Moesz ex Bat. & Peres
- Asteromella equiseti (Dobrozr.) Aa & Vanev
- Asteromella euonymella (Sacc.) Aa & Vanev
- Asteromella eupatoriicola (Kabát & Bubák) H. Ruppr.
- Asteromella exigua (Naumov) Vanev & Aa
- Asteromella eximia (Bubák) Aa & Vanev
- Asteromella ferulina Petr.
- Asteromella fici Peres & J.L. Bezerra
- Asteromella forsythiae Bedlan
- Asteromella fraxini (Berk. & M.A. Curtis) Petr.
- Asteromella fritillariae (Bonar & W.B. Cooke) Vanev & Aa
- Asteromella fuliginosa (C. Massal.) Aa
- Asteromella gaboonensis Cooke & Massee
- Asteromella galii Moesz & Lindtner
- Asteromella garbowskii (Gucevič) Ruszk.-Mich.
- Asteromella garrettii (Syd. & P. Syd.) Aa
- Asteromella gentianellae (C. Massal.) Petr.
- Asteromella geranii Chevassut
- Asteromella gorholtii H. Ruppr.
- Asteromella gratissima Petr. & Cif.
- Asteromella gregariella Petr.
- Asteromella gymnosporiae Syd.
- Asteromella hamadryadis (Speg.) Vanev & Aa
- Asteromella hederae C. Massal.
- Asteromella helleboricola (C. Massal.) Moesz
- Asteromella heringeri Bat. & J.L. Bezerra
- Asteromella homalanthi Cooke & Massee
- Asteromella huubii Ruszk.-Mich.
- Asteromella hybridae (Mig.) H. Ruppr.
- Asteromella hydrastidis (Bond.-Mont.) Vanev & Aa
- Asteromella innumera (Cooke & Harkn.) Petr.
- Asteromella inulae Petr.
- Asteromella isopyri (Thüm.) Petr. & Syd.
- Asteromella ixiolirii (Kalymb.) Aa & Vanev
- Asteromella kalmicola (Schwein.) Petr.
- Asteromella kuemmerlei Moesz
- Asteromella lafoensiae (Allesch.) Aa
- Asteromella lagotidis Murashk.
- Asteromella lantanae Petr.
- Asteromella latemarensis (Kabát & Bubák) H. Ruppr.
- Asteromella lathyri-silvestris H. Ruppr.
- Asteromella libertiae (Sacc.) U. Braun & Bensch
- Asteromella ligulariicola (Melnik) Vanev & Aa
- Asteromella linderae (Ellis & Everh.) Aa & Vanev
- Asteromella livida (Ellis & Everh.) Petr.
- Asteromella ludwigii Petr.
- Asteromella luzulina Syd.
- Asteromella lysimachiae (Allesch.) Ruszk.-Mich.
- Asteromella maculiformis (Sacc.) Petr.
- Asteromella malabailae (C. Massal. ex Sacc.) Aa
- Asteromella mali (H. Briard) Boerema
- Asteromella melampyrina (Aksel) Aa & Vanev
- Asteromella melittidis Chevassut
- Asteromella mespili (Roberge ex Desm.) Petr.
- Asteromella metopii Petr. & Cif.
- Asteromella microsticta Petr. & Cif.
- Asteromella moeszii Ruszk.-Mich. & Mułenko
- Asteromella moliniae Syd.
- Asteromella monardellae (W.B. Cooke) Petr.
- Asteromella morganjonesii N.D. Sharma
- Asteromella muscorum (Rostr.) Moesz
- Asteromella myriadea Cooke
- Asteromella nigrescens (Bonar & W.B. Cooke) Aa & Vanev
- Asteromella nogalesii Urries
- Asteromella nyssae (Cooke) Aa
- Asteromella odinae (Henn. & Pole-Evans) Aa
- Asteromella ononidis (Unamuno) Vanev & Aa
- Asteromella ourateae Bat., J.L. Bezerra & Poroca
- Asteromella ovata Thüm.
- Asteromella oxytropis Murashk.
- Asteromella paliuri (Lév.) Arx
- Asteromella paradisiaca Petr.
- Asteromella perowskiae (Zaprom.) Vanev & Aa
- Asteromella perpusilla Speg.
- Asteromella personatae (Allesch.) H. Ruppr.
- Asteromella petasitis Petr.
- Asteromella phalaridis Syd.
- Asteromella phyteumatis Petr.
- Asteromella picbaueri Petr.
- Asteromella pistaciarum Bremer & Petr.
- Asteromella pivensis (Bubák) Moesz ex Bat. & Peres
- Asteromella platanoidis (Sacc.) Petr.
- Asteromella pleurospermi (Died.) Petr.
- Asteromella podocarpi Syd.
- Asteromella poeverleinii Petr.
- Asteromella pomi Boerema, Loer. & Hamers
- Asteromella pongamiae (Syd. & P. Syd.) Aa
- Asteromella populina (Fuckel) Ruszk.-Mich.
- Asteromella porteana (Sacc.) Aa
- Asteromella praetervisa (Bubák) H. Ruppr.
- Asteromella proustiae (Speg.) Aa
- Asteromella prunellae (Ellis & Everh.) Ruszk.-Mich.
- Asteromella pruni-mahaleb (Pass.) Bedlan
- Asteromella psychotriae (Henn.) Aa
- Asteromella pterandrae (Allesch.) Vanev & Aa
- Asteromella pyricola (Sacc. & Speg.) Moesz ex Bat. & Peres
- Asteromella qualeae (Allesch.) Vanev & Aa
- Asteromella quercicola Petr.
- Asteromella quercifolii C. Massal.
- Asteromella ranunculi (Fuckel) Vanev & Aa
- Asteromella resedae (Oudem.) Petr.
- Asteromella rhipsalidicola (Speg.) Cif.
- Asteromella rhodiolae Petr.
- Asteromella rhoina (Kalchbr. & Cooke) Aa
- Asteromella rosicola (C. Massal.) H. Ruppr.
- Asteromella rumicis (Bondartsev) Aa & Vanev
- Asteromella rupprechtii Ruszk.-Mich.
- Asteromella saccardoi (Thüm.) Petr.
- Asteromella saginae Urries
- Asteromella salicina (Kabát & Bubák) Ruszk.-Mich.
- Asteromella saponariae (Fuckel) Petr.
- Asteromella scabiosae (Kalymb.) Vanev & Aa
- Asteromella scaevolae Petr.
- Asteromella schultziae Murashk.
- Asteromella scorzonerae Petr.
- Asteromella scrophularina (P. Karst.) H. Ruppr.
- Asteromella semelicola Urries
- Asteromella senecionis-nemorensis (Săvul. & Sandu) Vanev & Aa
- Asteromella silvarum Petr.
- Asteromella sissoo (Died.) Aa
- Asteromella solani (Gonz. Frag. & Cif.) Cif.
- Asteromella sorbicola (Rabenh.) U. Braun & Ruszk.-Mich.
- Asteromella stachydis (Brunaud) Petr.
- Asteromella staphyleicola (Oudem.) Petr.
- Asteromella striolata (Sacc.) H. Ruppr.
- Asteromella strychni (Allesch.) Aa & Vanev
- Asteromella tamicola (Woron.) Aa & Vanev
- Asteromella tanaceti (Vasyag.) Vanev & Aa
- Asteromella tectonae (Syd., P. Syd. & E.J. Butler) Aa
- Asteromella terminaliae (Henn.) Aa
- Asteromella thalictrina Petr.
- Asteromella thermopsidis (Thüm.) Aa
- Asteromella thlaspeos Murashk.
- Asteromella tiliicola (Oudem.) Arx
- Asteromella tobira (Gucevič) Aa & Vanev
- Asteromella trautmanniana (Moesz) Moesz
- Asteromella tricyclae (Speg.) Aa
- Asteromella ulmi Boerema
- Asteromella ungerniae (Vasyag.) Vanev & Aa
- Asteromella urgineae Bremer
- Asteromella velata Petr.
- Asteromella vincae (Thüm.) Bedlan & Plenk
- Asteromella vogelii (A. Henkel) Petr.
- Asteromella vulgaris Thüm.
- Asteromella wandae (Namysł.) H. Ruppr.
- Asteromella woronowii (Woron.) Vanev & Aa
