= Vialaeaceae =

Scientific classification
- Kingdom: Fungi
- Division: Ascomycota
- Class: Sordariomycetes
- Order: Amphisphaeriales
- Family: Vialaeaceae; P.F.Cannon

Type genus
- Vialaea Sacc.

Family of fungi

The Vialaeaceae are a family of fungi in the Ascomycota and class Sordariomycetes. In 2018, it was placed in the order Amphisphaeriales.

This is a monotypic taxon, containing the single genus Vialaea. The family of Vialaeaceae was named by P.F. Cannon in 1995. Pier Andrea Saccardo circumscribed the genus in Bull. Soc. Mycol. France vol.12 n page 66 in 1896.

The genus name of Vialaea is in honour of Pierre Viala (1859–1936), who was a French scientist.

Species in the family are distributed in both temperate and tropical areas of the world, where they grow parasitically on twigs.

== Species ==
As accepted by Species Fungorum;

- Vialaea bambusae Hara (1913)
- Vialaea insculpta (Fr.) Sacc. (1896)
- Vialaea mangiferae Senan. & K.D. Hyde (2014)
- Vialaea minutella Petr. (1952)

Former species; V. ingae Rehm (1901) = Diatractium ingae, Phyllachoraceae family
