= Eugenia indica =

Conservation status
- Endangered (IUCN 2.3)

Scientific classification
- Kingdom: Plantae
- Clade: Tracheophytes
- Clade: Angiosperms
- Clade: Eudicots
- Clade: Rosids
- Order: Myrtales
- Family: Myrtaceae
- Genus: Eugenia
- Species: E. indica

Binomial name
- Eugenia indica (Wight) Chithra

Synonyms
- Jossinia indica Wight

Species of flowering plant

Eugenia indica is a species of plant in the family Myrtaceae. It is endemic to the southern Western Ghats of southwestern India.
