= Jean Baptiste Henri Joseph Desmazières =

French amateur mycologist (1786–1862)

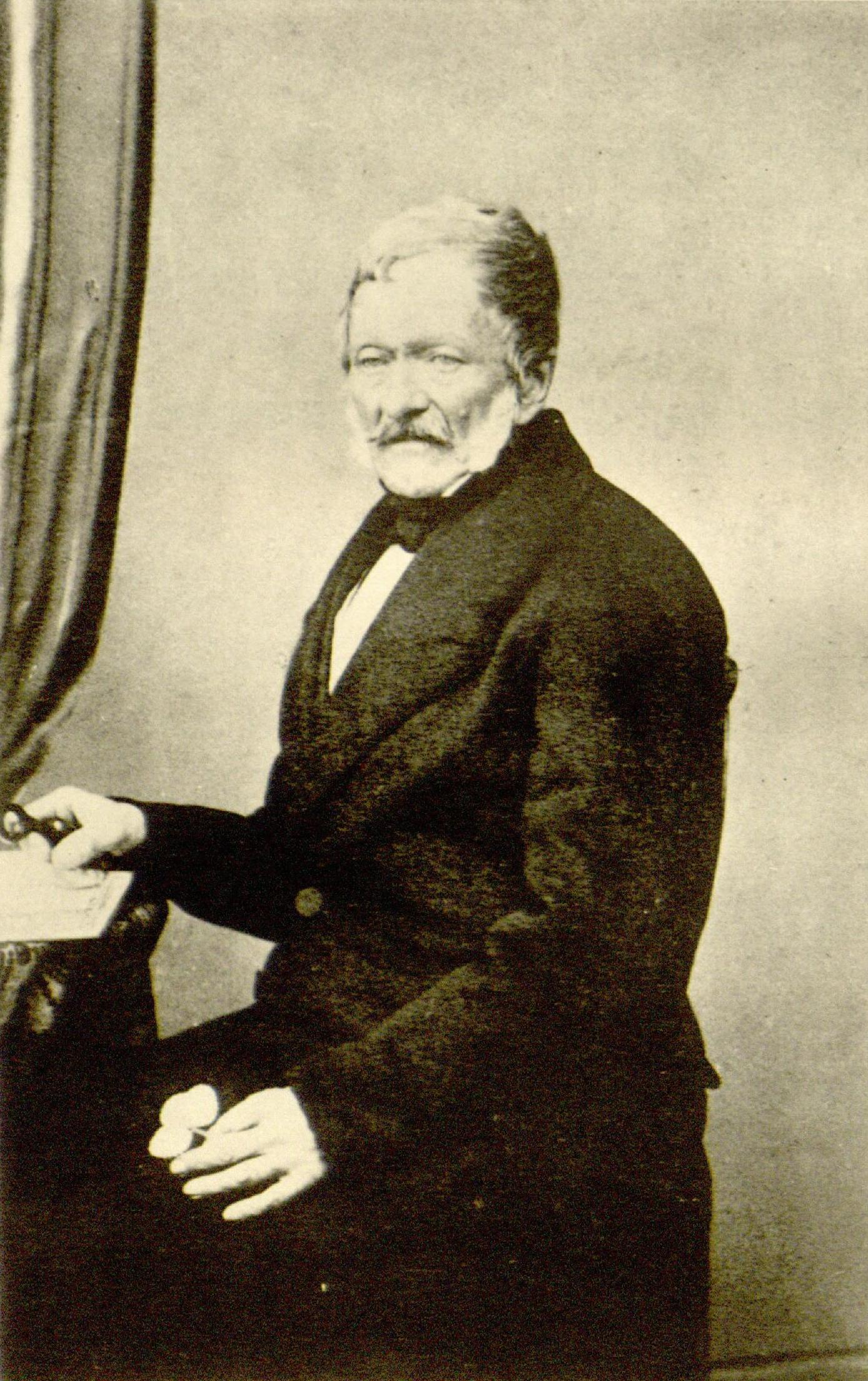
Jean Baptiste Henri Joseph Desmazières (1786-1862)

Jean Baptiste Henri Joseph Desmazières (10 July 1786 in Lille – 23 June 1862 in Lambersart) was a merchant of Lille and an amateur mycologist. He was the editor of the scientific journals "Annales des sciences naturelles" and the "Bulletin de la société des sciences de Lille".

He was creator of the exsiccatae series "Plantes cryptogames du Nord de la France" (1825–1851) and "Plantes cryptogames de France" (1853–1861). In 1827 he published a treatise on the genus Mycoderma, titled "Recherches microscopiques et physiologiques sur le genre Mycoderma".

He was the binomial author of the fungi species Agaricus radians and Aspergillus clavatus.

== Eponymous taxa ==
- Desmazierella Lib. (1829), genus of fungi in the family Sarcoscyphaceae,
- Desmazieria (now Ramalina and Niebla, genera of lichen)
- Neoascochyta desmazieri (Cavara) Qian Chen & L. Cai, 2015, species of fungi, (syn. Ascochyta desmazieri)
- Cainia desmazieri C.Moreau & E.Müll. ex Krug (1977)
- Meloderma desmazieri Darker, 1967

== See also ==
- Category:Taxa named by Jean Baptiste Henri Joseph Desmazières
