= Ohleria =

Scientific classification
- Kingdom: Fungi
- Division: Ascomycota
- Class: Dothideomycetes
- Order: Pleosporales
- Family: Melanommataceae
- Genus: Ohleria; Fuckel

Genus of fungi

Ohleria is a genus of fungi in the family Melanommataceae.

The genus name of Ohleria is in honour of Heinrich Ohler (1803-1876), who was a German botanist from the Dr. Senckenberg Foundation in Frankfurt.

The genus was circumscribed by Karl Wilhelm Gottlieb Leopold Fuckel in Jahrb. Nassauischen Vereins. Naturk. vols. 23-24 on page 163 in 1870.

== Species ==
As accepted by GBIF;

- Ohleria brasiliensis Starbäck
- Ohleria clematidis Fautrey
- Ohleria haloxyli Kravtzev
- Ohleria kravtzevii Schwarzman
- Ohleria modesta Fuckel
- Ohleria obducens G.Winter
- Ohleria phyllanthi Tilak, S.B.Kale & S.V.S.Kale
- Ohleria phyllanthicolla U.S.Patel, A.K.Pandey & R.C.Rajak
- Ohleria quercicola Fabre
- Ohleria rugulosa Fuckel
- Ohleria silicata Kravtzev
- Ohleria ulmi Fabre
