= Irma Josefa Gamundí de Amos =

Argentine mycologist (1927–2023)

- Born: January 13, 1927
- Died: 17 October 2023 (aged 96); Bariloche, Argentina
- Education: Universidad de Buenos Aires
- Awards: Konex Award
- Scientific career
- Fields: Mycology
- Author abbrev. (botany): Gamundí

Irma Josefa Gamundí de Amos (13 January 1927 – 17 October 2023) was an Argentine mycologist known for her work on the fungal diversity of Argentina. She earned her degree (1953) and doctorate (1959) at the Universidad de Buenos Aires. She directed the Instituto Spegazzini at the Universidad Nacional de La Plata from 1975 to 1991. She published about a hundred articles, describing three genera and 15 species new to science. She received the Konex Award in 2003 and was named an Honorary Member of the British Mycological Society in 2008. She passed away in 2023.

== Eponyms of Irma Gamundí ==
=== Eponymous genera ===
- Gamundia Raithelh.

=== Eponymous species ===
- Ascobolus gamundiae Dokm. & Ranalli
- Cortinarius gamundiae (E.Horak) E.Horak, Peintner, M.M.Moser & Vilgalys
- Cystangium gamundiae Nouhra & Trierv.-Per.
- Cyttaria gamundiae Y.Arias, G.C.González & Rajchenb.
- Dictyochaeta gamundiae Aramb. & Cabello
- Dwayaangam gamundiae Cazau, Aramb. & Cabello
- Edmundmasonia gamundiae Aramb. & Godeas
- Galerina gamundiae Singer
- Geomorium gamundiae Kraisit., Pfister, Mujic, Healy & M.E.Sm.
- Hanseniaspora gamundiae Libkind, Čadež & Hittinger
- Hyphodontia gamundiae Gresl. & Rajchenb.
- Lophodermium gamundiae P.R.Johnst.
- Menispora gamundiae Aramb. & Cabello
- Peziza gamundiae Pfister, Caiafa & M.E.Sm.
- Pseudomitrula gamundiae A.C.Grupe, M.E.Sm., Haelew. & C.A.Quandt
- Octospora gamundiana G.M.Suárez & Catania

== Selected publications ==
- Gamundí, I. (1962). "Discomycetes inoperculados del Parque Nacional Nahuel Huapí (Argentina)". Darwiniana (in Spanish). 12 (3): 385–463.
- Gamundí, I. (1964). "Discomycetes operculados del Parque Nacional Nahuel Huapí, Argentina". Darwiniana (in Spanish). 13 (2): 568–606.
- Gamundí, I. (1971). "Algunos Discomycetes de Chile". Boletín de la Sociedad Argentina de Botánica (in Spanish). 13 (4): 260–289.
- Gamundí, I.J. (1971). "Las Cyttariales sudamericanas (Fungi-Ascomycetes)". Darwiniana (in Spanish). 16 (3–4): 461–510.
- Gamundí, I.J. (1977). "Subantarctic Geoglossaceae: I". Kew Bulletin. 31 (3): 731–739. doi:10.2307/4119426.
- Gamundí, I.J. (1979). "Subantarctic Geoglossaceae. II". Sydowia. 32: 86–98.
- Gamundí, I.J. (2003). "Discomycetes (Fungi, Ascomycota) de Chile austral. I". Darwiniana (in Spanish). 41 (1–4): 29–36.
- Gamundí, I.J.; Amos, V. (2007). "Exploraciones micológicas en Tierra del Fuego". Boletín de la Sociedad Argentina de Botánica (in Spanish). 42 (1–2): 131–148.
