= Ellurema =

Scientific classification
- Kingdom: Fungi
- Division: Ascomycota
- Class: Sordariomycetes
- Order: Amphisphaeriales
- Family: Sporocadaceae
- Genus: Ellurema; Nag Raj & W.B. Kendr.

Type species
- Ellurema indica (Punith.) Nag Raj & W.B. Kendr.

Genus of fungi

Ellurema is a genus of fungi in the family Sporocadaceae; according to the 2007 Outline of Ascomycota, the placement in this family is uncertain. This is a monotypic genus, containing the single species Ellurema indica.
