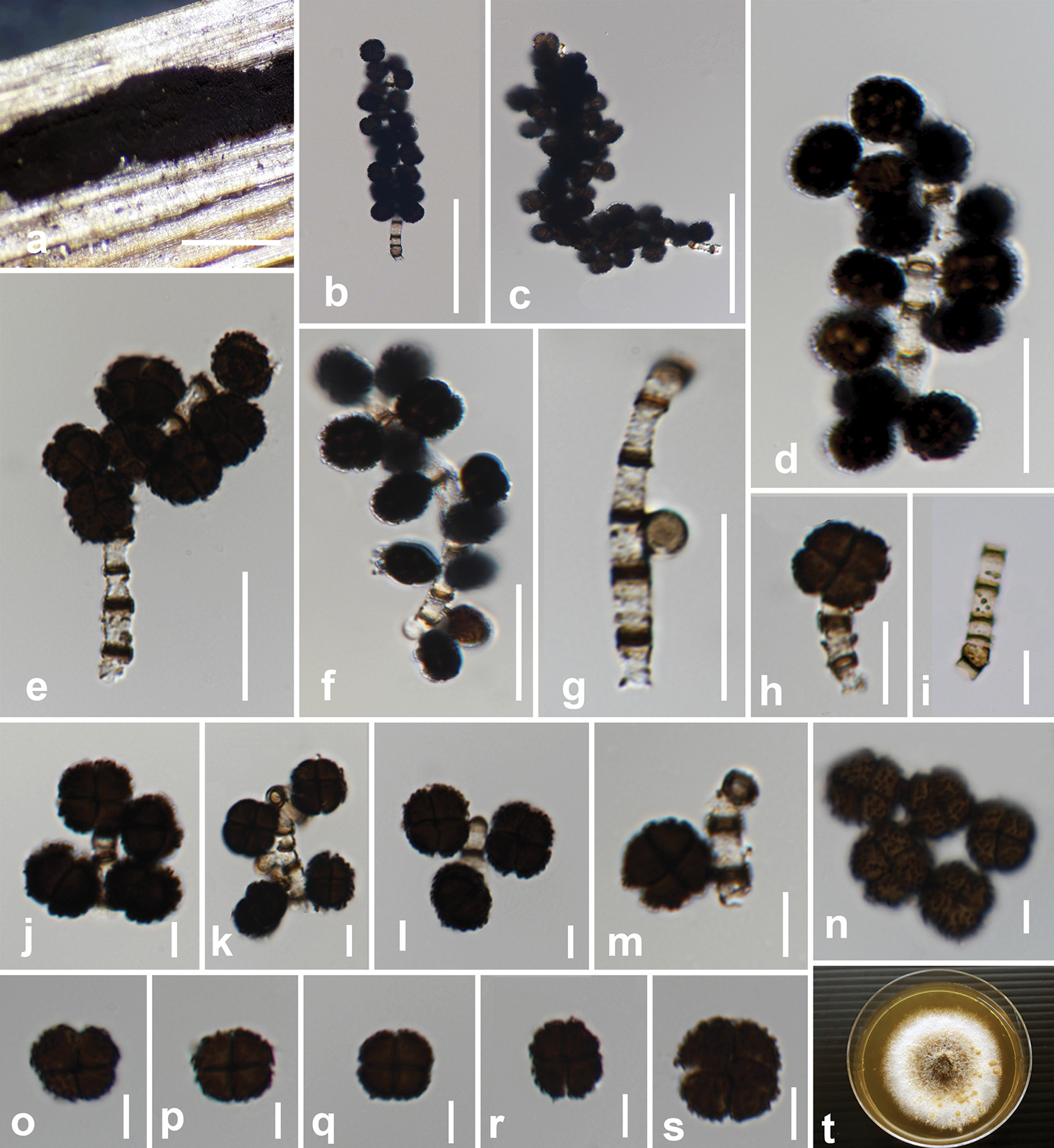
- Dictyoarthrinium musae

Scientific classification
- Kingdom: Fungi
- Division: Ascomycota
- Class: Sordariomycetes
- Order: Amphisphaeriales
- Family: Apiosporaceae; K.D.Hyde, J.Fröhl., Joanne E.Taylor & M.E.Barr (1998)

Type genus
- Apiospora Sacc. (1875)

= Apiosporaceae =

Family of fungi

The Apiosporaceae are a family of fungi in the Ascomycota. It was placed in the order Amphisphaeriales in 2020.

The family was circumscribed in 1998. Species in the family are saprobic, and derive nutrients by decomposing and digesting plant matter, especially palms and grasses. Anamorph genera include Arthrinium and Cordella.

== Genera ==
As accepted by Species Fungorum and Outline of Fungi 2020.

- Apiospora Sacc. (102)
- Apiosporella Höhn. (1909) – 5 spp.
- Appendicospora K.D. Hyde (2)
- Arthrinium Kunze (73)
- Cordella Speg. (6)
- Dictyoarthrinium S. Hughes (6)
- Nigrospora Zimm. (25)
- Papularia Forssk. (5)
- Phaeoharziella Loubière (1)
- Pseudobasidium Tengwall (1)
- Rhinocephalum Kamyschko (1)
- Spegazzinia Sacc. (17)
