= Truncatella (fungus) =

Scientific classification
- Kingdom: Fungi
- Division: Ascomycota
- Class: Sordariomycetes
- Order: Amphisphaeriales
- Family: Sporocadaceae
- Genus: Truncatella

Genus of fungi

The fungal genus Truncatella in the family Sporocadaceae, and in the Amphisphaeriales order, includes plant pathogens such as Truncatella laurocerasi.

Truncatella angustata has been linked with grapevine trunk disease in northern Iran. Neopestalotiopsis, Pestalotiopsis and Truncatella fungal species (all in family Sporocadaceae) are associated with grapevine trunk diseases in France. It also causes canker and twig dieback in blueberry plants.

== Species ==
As accepted by Species Fungorum;

- Truncatella angustata (Pers.) S. Hughes (1958)
- Truncatella bella Bat. (1960)
- Truncatella betulae (Morochk.) S.J. Lee & Crous (2006)
- Truncatella conorum-piceae (Tubeuf) Steyaert (1949)
- Truncatella excelsa (Petr.) Shoemaker, C.E. Babc. & E. Müll. (1989)
- Truncatella hartigii (Tubeuf) Steyaert (1949)
- Truncatella helichrysi (Severini) B. Sutton (1996)
- Truncatella laurocerasi (Westend.) Steyaert (1949)
- Truncatella megaspora S.J. Lee & Crous (2006)
- Truncatella tianshanica Z.Q. Yuan & Z.Y. Zhao (1992)
- Truncatella truncata (Lév.) Steyaert (1949)
- Truncatella vitalbae (Shoemaker & E. Müll.) Shoemaker, C.E. Babc. & E. Müll. (1989)
- Truncatella wangikarii Somani (1980)

Former species;

- T. pampeana (Speg.) Steyaert (1961) = Pestalotiopsis pampeana, Pestalotiopsidaceae
- T. pestalozzioides (Dearn. & Fairm.) Shoemaker, C.E. Babc. & E. Müll. (1989) = Pestalotiopsis pestalozzioides, Pestalotiopsidaceae
- T. pitospora (M.E.A. Costa & Sousa da Câmara) Bissett (1983) = Pestalotia pitospora, Pestalotiopsidaceae
- T. ramulosa (J.F.H. Beyma) Steyaert (1949) = Truncatella laurocerasi]], Bartaliniaceae
- T. restionacearum S.J. Lee & Crous (2006) = Heterotruncatella restionacearum, Sporocadaceae
- T. spadicea S.J. Lee & Crous (2006) = Heterotruncatella spadicea, Sporocadaceae
- T. spartii Senan., Camporesi & K.D. Hyde (2015) = Heterotruncatella spartii, Sporocadaceae
- T. suffocata (Ellis & Everh.) Kausar (1961) = Pestalotiopsis suffocata, Pestalotiopsidaceae
- T. trevoae (Speg.) Nag Raj (1993) = Chrysalidopsis trevoae, Ascomycota
