= Cainiaceae =

Scientific classification
- Kingdom: Fungi
- Division: Ascomycota
- Class: Sordariomycetes
- Order: Xylariales
- Family: Cainiaceae; J.C.Krug (1978)

Type genus
- Cainia Arx & E.Müll. (1955)

Genera
- Atrotorquata; Cainia; Seynesia

Family of fungi

Cainiaceae is a family of fungi in the order Xylariales. The family was circumscribed by John C. Krug in 1979.
