= Amphisphaeriales =

Scientific classification
- Kingdom: Fungi
- Division: Ascomycota
- Class: Sordariomycetes
- Subclass: Xylariomycetidae
- Order: Amphisphaeriales; D. Hawksw. & O.E. Erikss., 1986

Order of fungi

The Amphisphaeriales are an order of fungi within the class Sordariomycetes and subclass Xylariomycetidae.

Amphisphaeriales was circumscribed in 1986 by mycologists David Leslie Hawksworth and Ove Erik Eriksson, and Xylariomycetidae by Ove Erik Eriksson and Katarina Winka in 1997.

The Amphisphaeriales as an order, was then treated as a synonym of Xylariales, just one year later (by authors Eriksson & Hawksworth, 1987). This classification was followed by subsequent authors and later supported by molecular data (Hawksworth et al. 1995). The order was then resurrected by Senanayake et al. (in 2015), to include Amphisphaeriaceae, Clypeosphaeriaceae and another four novel families derived from Amphisphaeriaceae (Bartaliniaceae, Discosiaceae, Pestalotiopsidaceae and Phlogicylindriaceae). These later 4 families were then synonymised by Jaklitsch et al. (in 2016). An older family name of Sporocadaceae was reestablished to accommodate them instead (Crous et al. 2015). Together with the 'Amphisphaeriaceae and 'Phlogicylindriaceae, the family of Sporocadaceae was then accommodated in the Xylariales order. As the Amphisphaeriales was not accepted due to a lack of phylogenetic support in their DNA analysis (Jaklitsch et al. 2016).

DNA analysis in 2018 confirmed the placement of the order and subclass, it was a sister to the Xylariales order.

Based on previous studies, Wijayawardene et al. (2018a) accepted 11 families in Amphisphaeriales. Then in 2020, more families (and genera) were added to the order.

Generally, they have paraphyses that are dispersed among the asci and tapering from base to the tip, or abundant and branching to form a reticulum. They are often covered in gelatin. A lot of genera within the order have perithecia which are immersed in host tissue, with or without a clypeus. The asci are formed in a hymenium and have amyloid ascal apices and apical rings. Ascospores have variable shapes and variable numbers of septa, but most are hyaline, but pigmented ascospores are also known. Conidiogenesis tends to be holoblastic and then conidia are formed on denticles. Conidiophores are solitary or united into acervuli and are classified in genera such as Nodulisporium, Selenosporella, Microdochium and Pestalotiopsis.

The fungi are found in a range of habitats, some are biotrophic on higher plants and others are saprophytic on forest detritus.

The Amphisphaeriales includes fungi that have been included in the Xylariales order and also the Diatrypales order.

== Distribution ==
Genera in the order have a cosmopolitan distribution. They are found in places such as China, Argentina, Italy, Austria (Amphisphaeria on Rhododendrons,) Montana, USA and (all over) Australia.

== Families ==
As accepted by Wijayawardene et al. 2020 (with amount of genera);

- Amphisphaeriaceae G. Winter (4)
- Apiosporaceae K.D. Hyde, J. Fröhl., Joanne E. Taylor & M.E. Barr (4)
- Beltraniaceae Nann. (9)
- Castanediellaceae Hern.-Restr., Guarro & Crous (1)
- Clypeophysalosporaceae Giraldo & Crous (4)
- Hyponectriaceae Petr. (17)
- Iodosphaeriaceae O. Hilber (1)
- Melogrammataceae G. Winter (1)
- Oxydothidaceae Konta & K.D. Hyde (1)
- Phlogicylindriaceae Senan. & K.D. Hyde (3)
- Pseudomassariaceae Senan. & K.D. Hyde (4)
- Pseudotruncatellaceae Crous (1)
- Sporocadaceae Corda (35)
- Vialaeaceae e P.F. Cannon (1)

Genera incertae sedis:

- Chitonospora E. Bommer, M. Rousseau & Sacc. (1)
