= List of WHO fungal priority pathogens =

WHO fungal priority pathogens are groups of pathogenic fungi that the World Health Organization deems in need of global attention.

The list has three priority groups. In decreasing order of concern, they are: critical, high, and medium.

== Critical group ==
- Cryptococcus neoformans
- Candida auris
- Aspergillus fumigatus
- Candida albicans
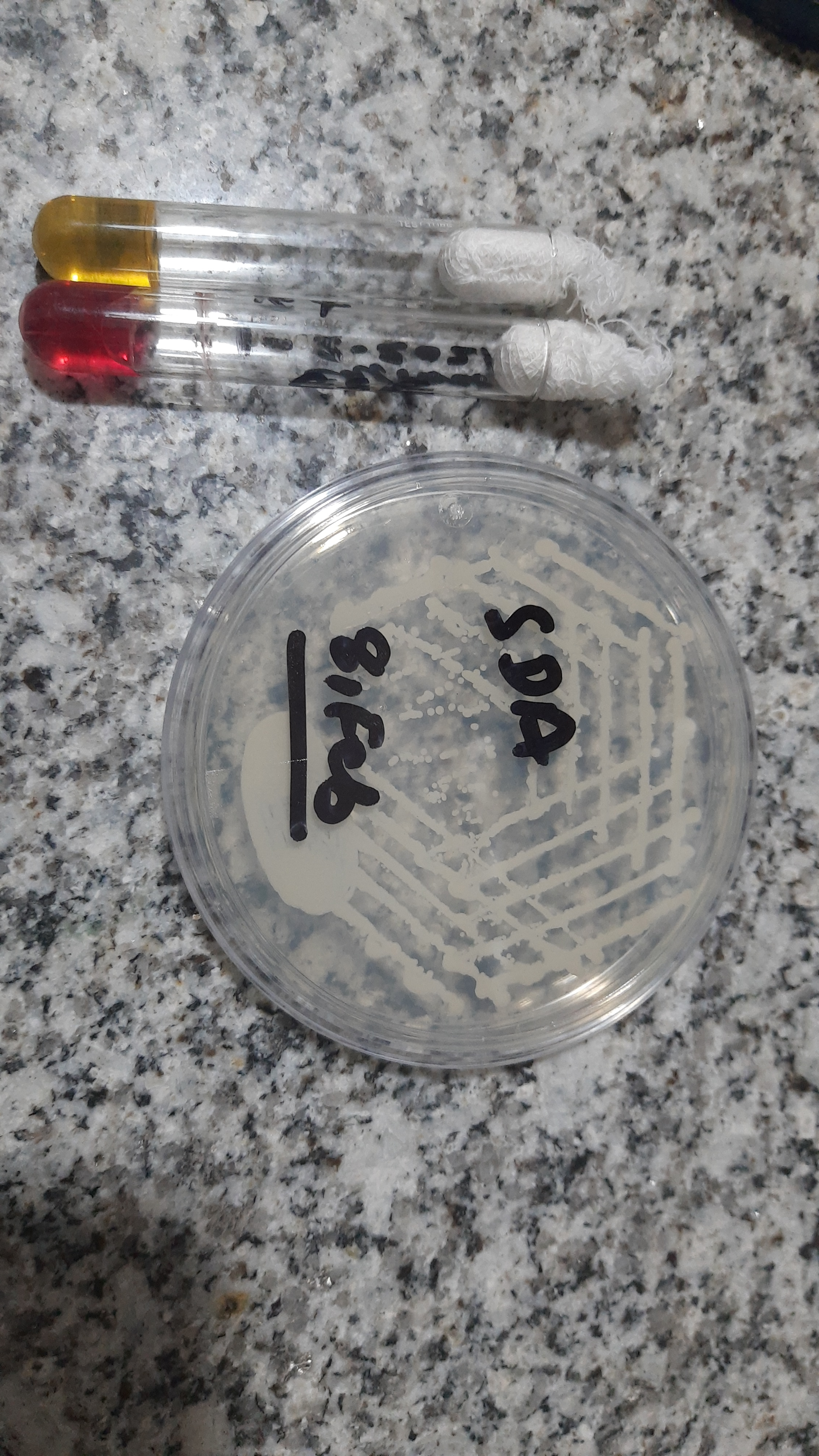
Cryptococcus neoformans

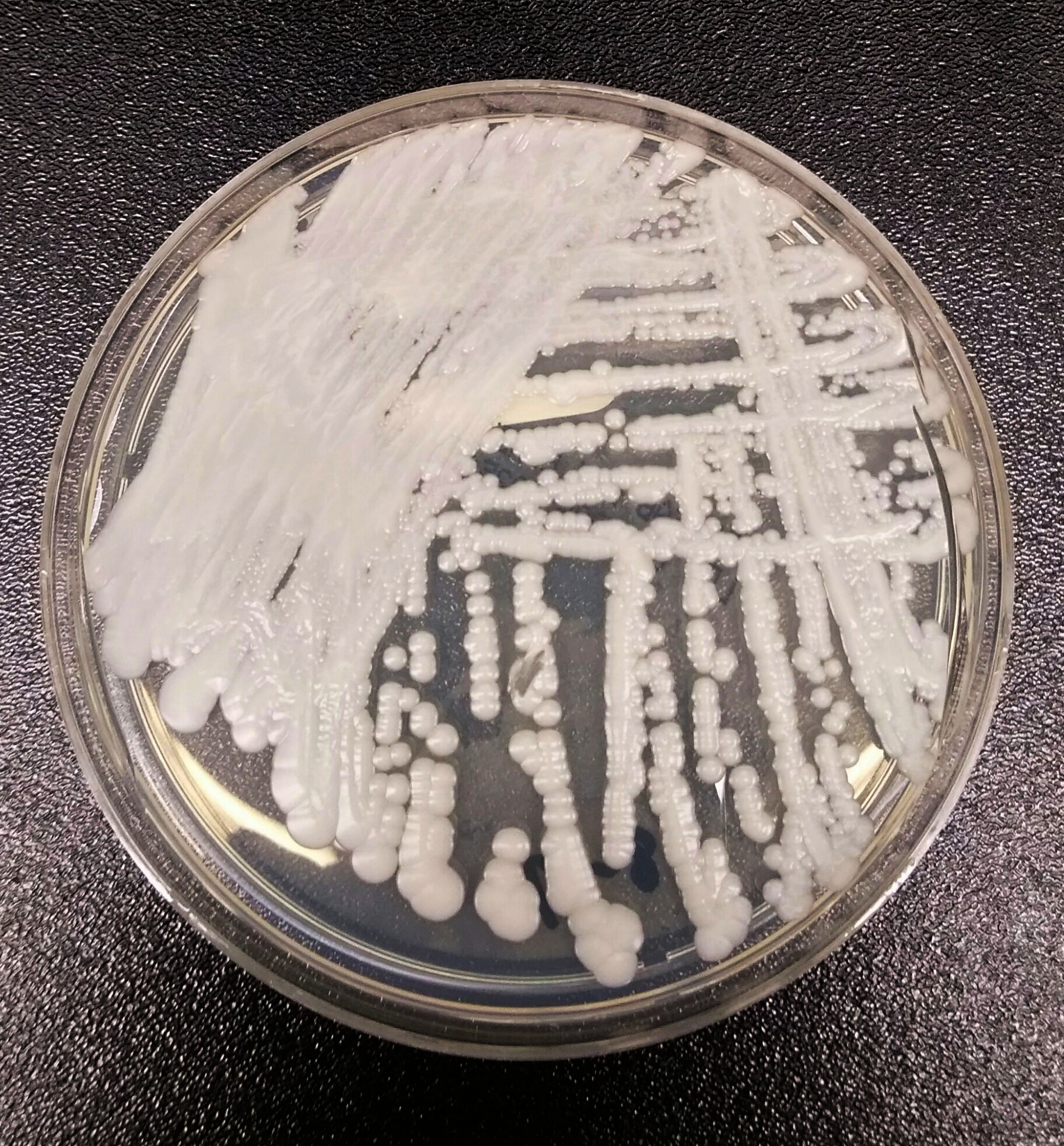
Candida auris

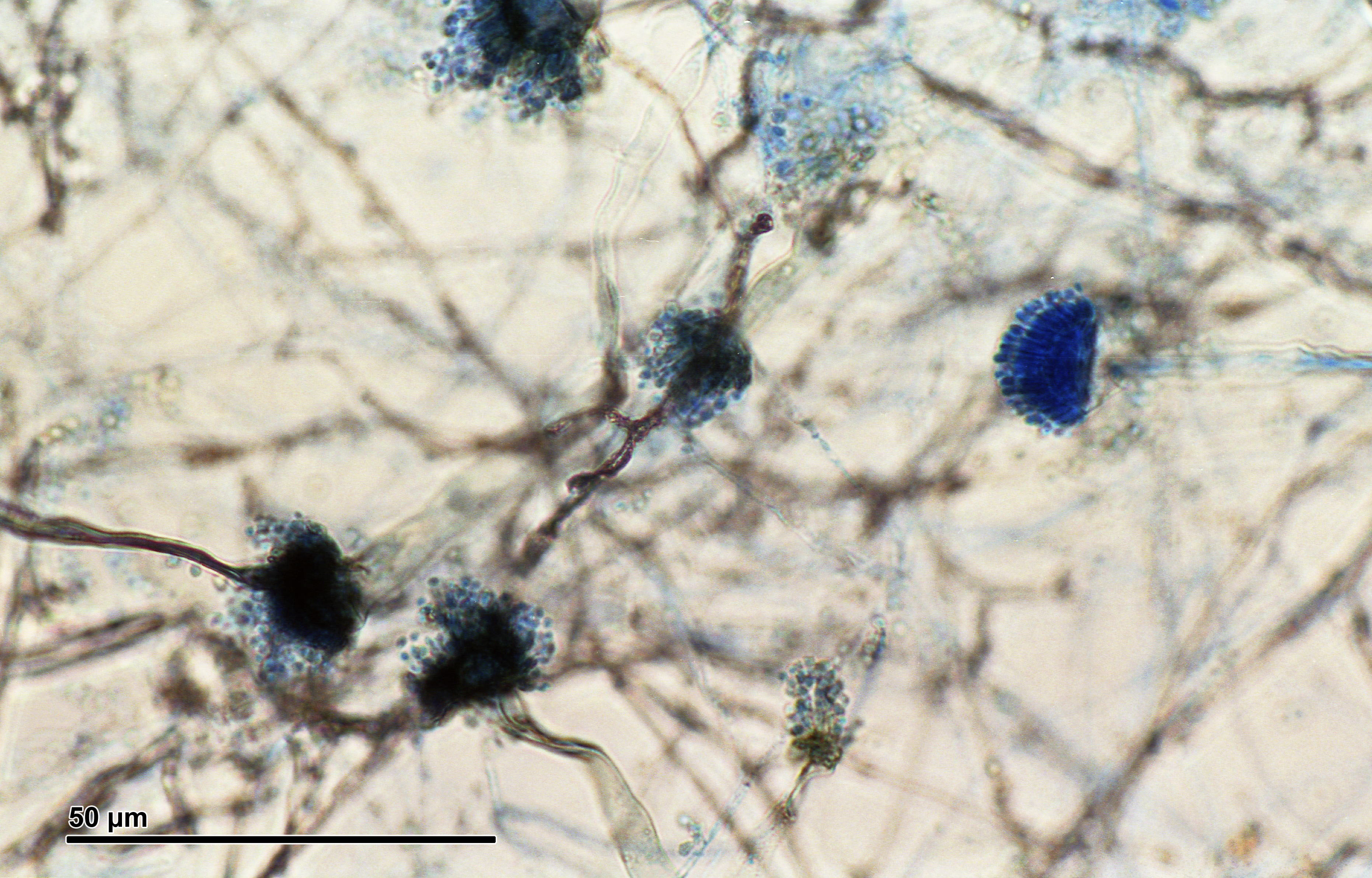
Aspergillus fumigatus

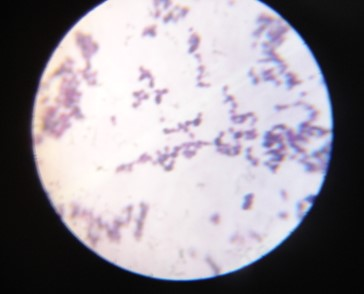
Candida albicans

== High group ==
- Nakaseomyces glabrata (formerly Candida glabrata)
- Histoplasma spp.
  - Histoplasma capsulatum
    - Histoplasma capsulatum var. capsulatum
    - Histoplasma capsulatum var. duboisii
    - Histoplasma capsulatum var. farciminosum
  - Histoplasma duboisii
  - Histoplasma muris
- Eumycetoma causative agents, including:
  - Acremonium falciform
  - Acremonium kiliense
  - Acremonium recifei
  - Aspergillus flavus
  - Aspergillus nidulans
  - Cladophialophora bantiana
  - Cladophialophora mycetomatis
  - Curvularia geniculata
  - Curvularia lunata
  - Cylindrocarpon cyanescens
  - Exophiala jeanselmei
  - Falciformispora senegalensis
  - Fusarium moniliforme
  - Fusarium solani
  - Glenospora clapieri
  - Leptosphaeria senegalensis
  - Leptosphaeria tompkinsii
  - Madurella grisea
  - Madurella mycetomatis
  - Microsporum audouinii
  - Microsporum canis
  - Neotestudina rosatii
  - Phaeoacremonium parasiticum
  - Phialophora cyanescens
  - Phialophora verrucosa
  - Scedosporium (ex. Pseudoalleschia) boydii
  - Pyrenochaeta mackinonii
  - Pyrenochaeta romeroi
  - Trichophyton rubrum
  - Zopfia rosatii
- Mucorales
  - includes 13 families, 56 genera, 300 species
- Fusarium spp.
  - see List of Fusarium species
- Candida tropicalis
- Candida parapsilosis
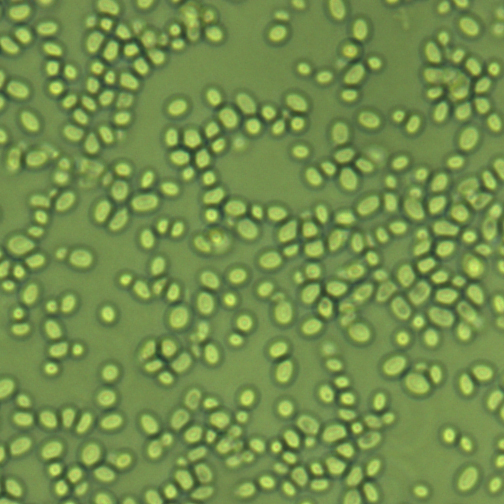
Nakaseomyces glabrata

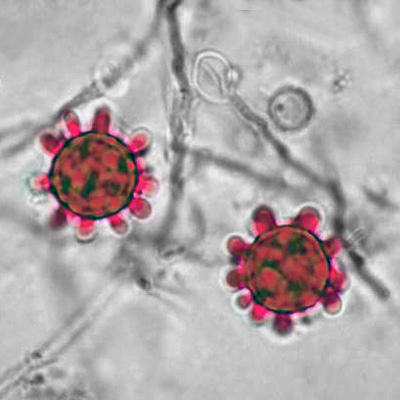
Histoplasma capsulatum

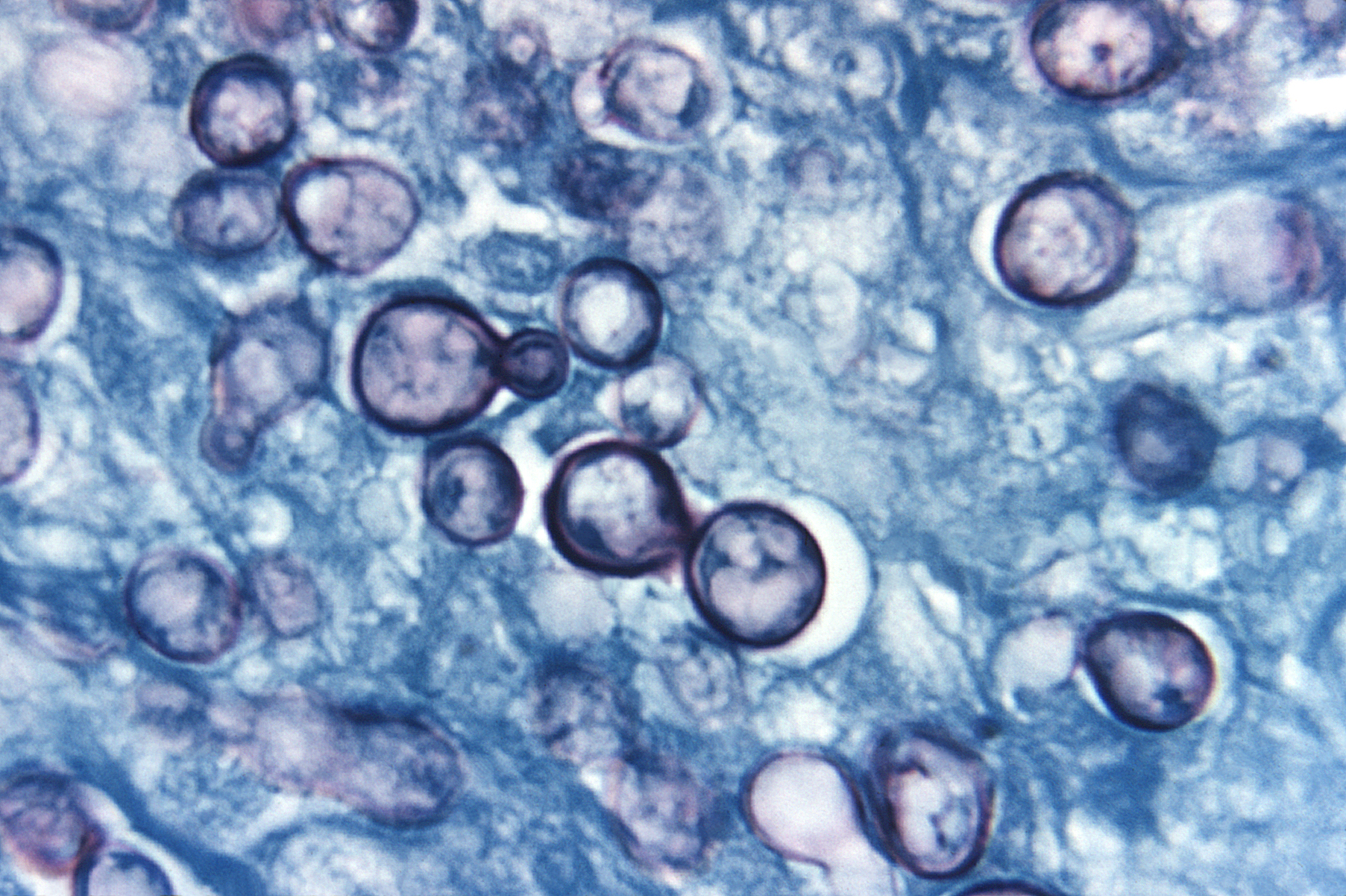
Histoplasma capsulatum var. duboisii

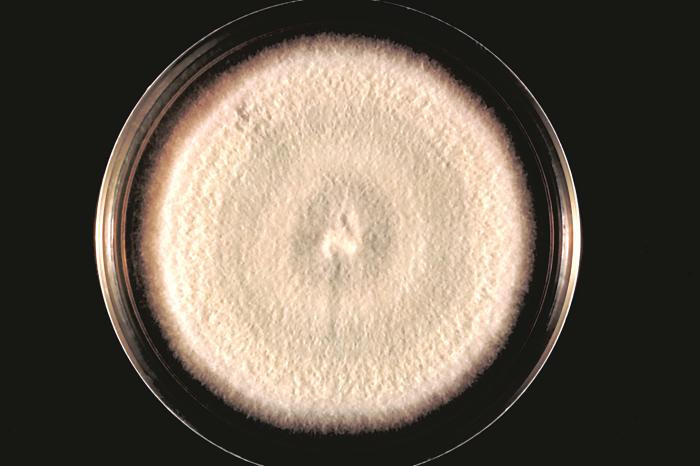
Acremonium falciforme

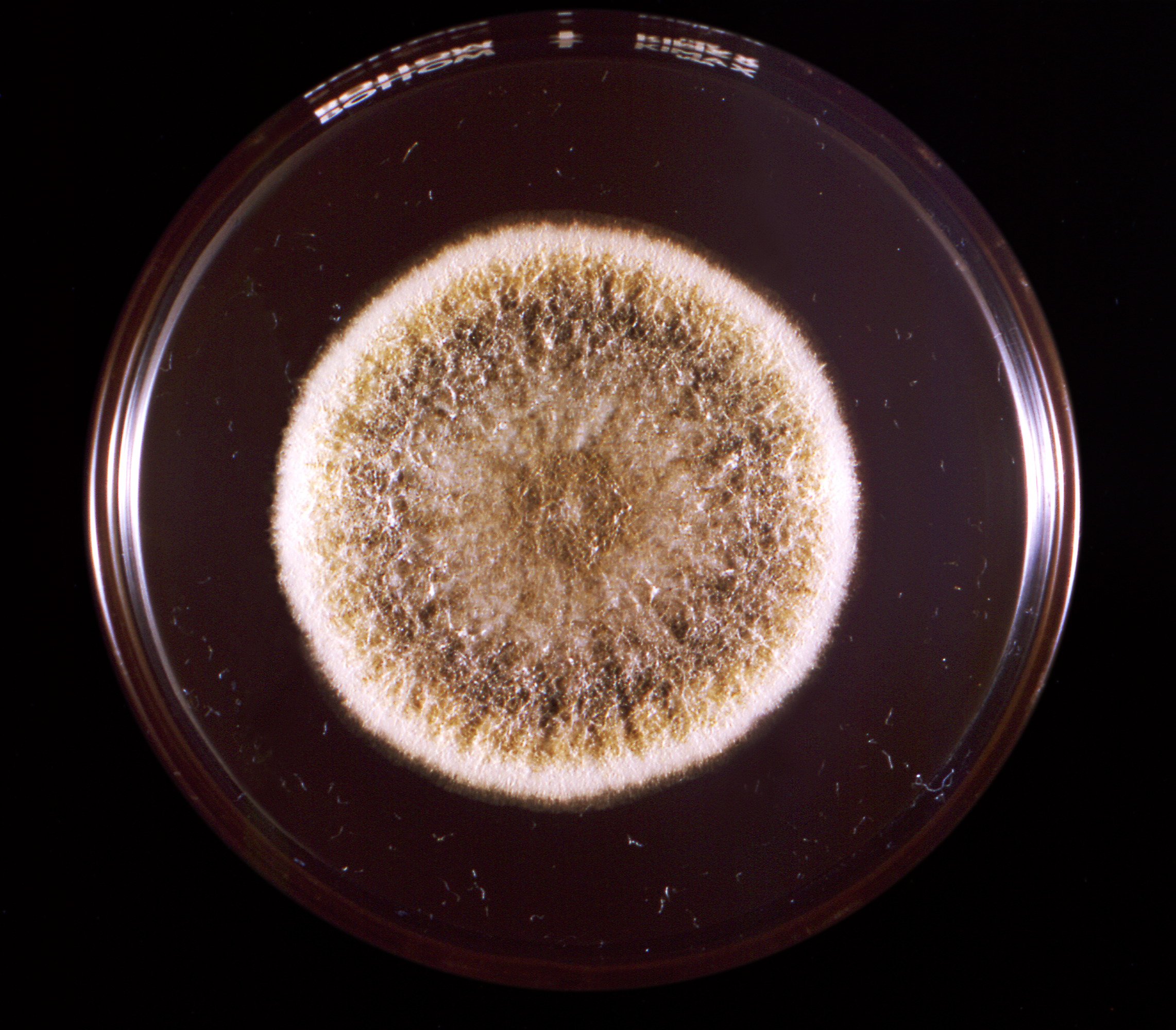
Aspergillus flavus

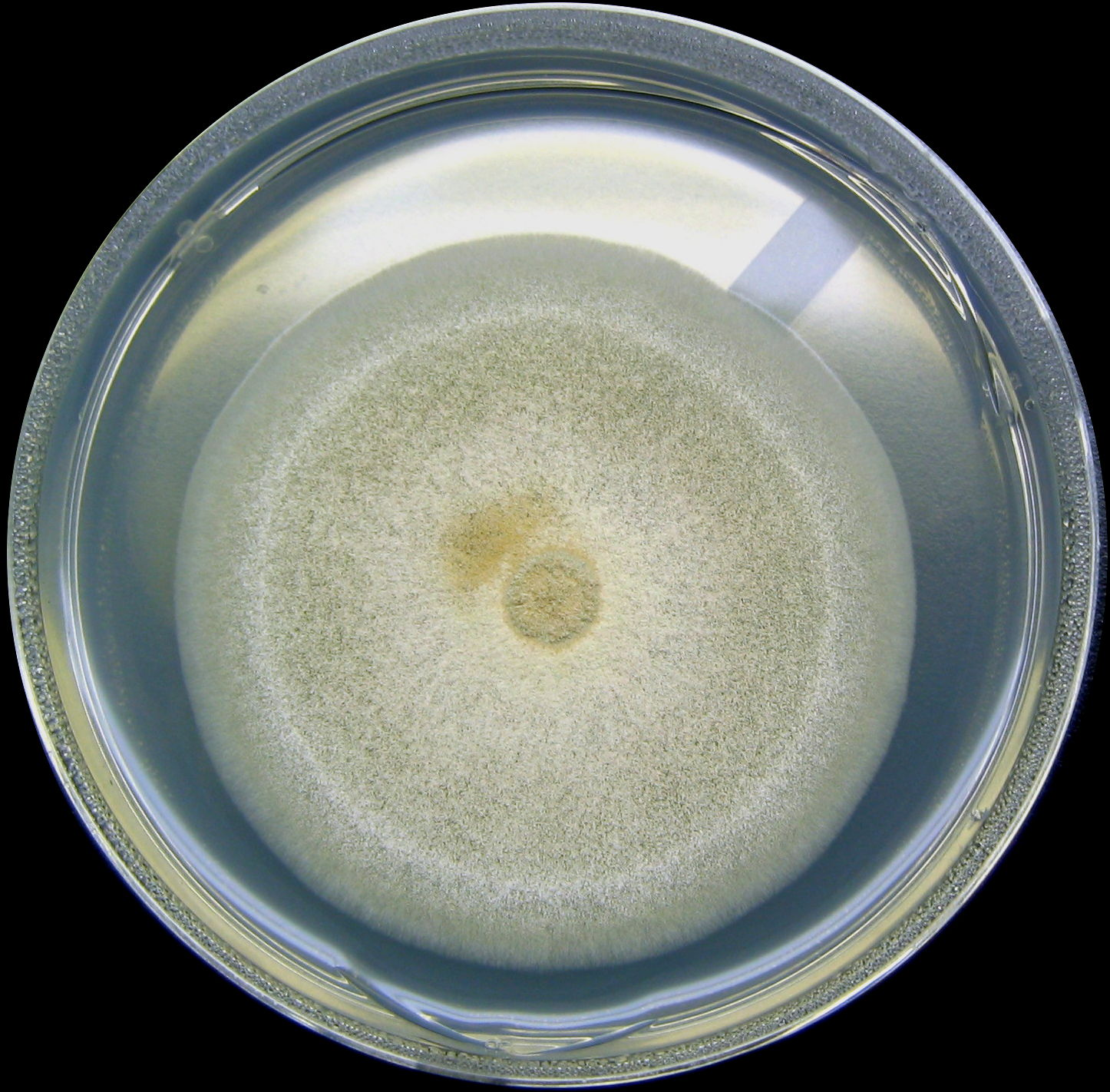
Aspergillus nidulans

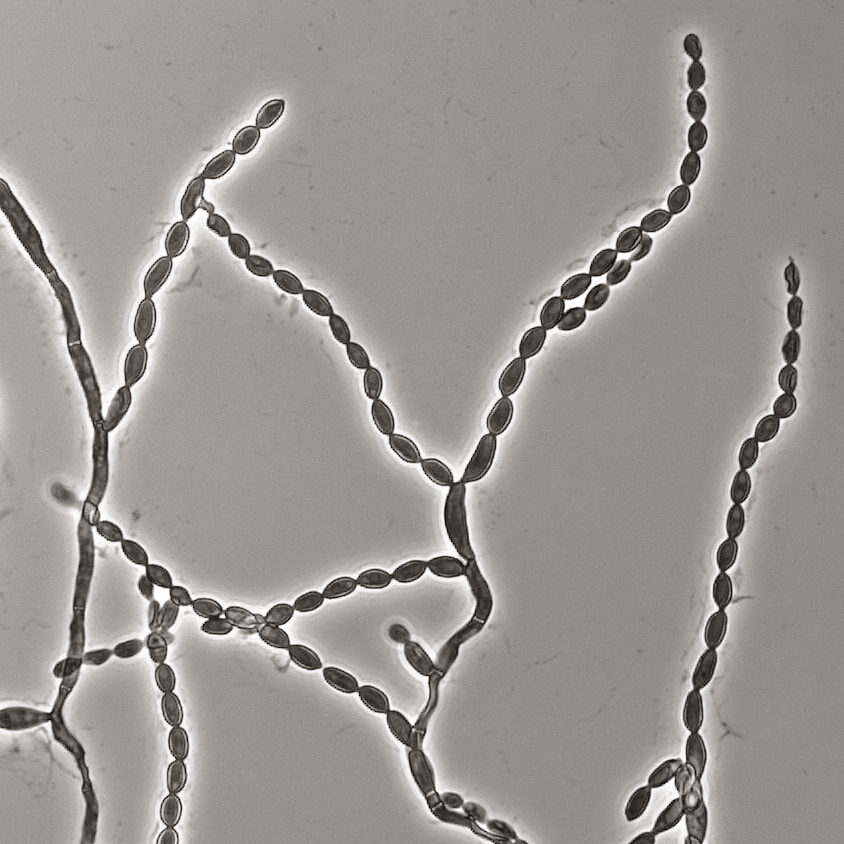
Cladophialophora bantiana

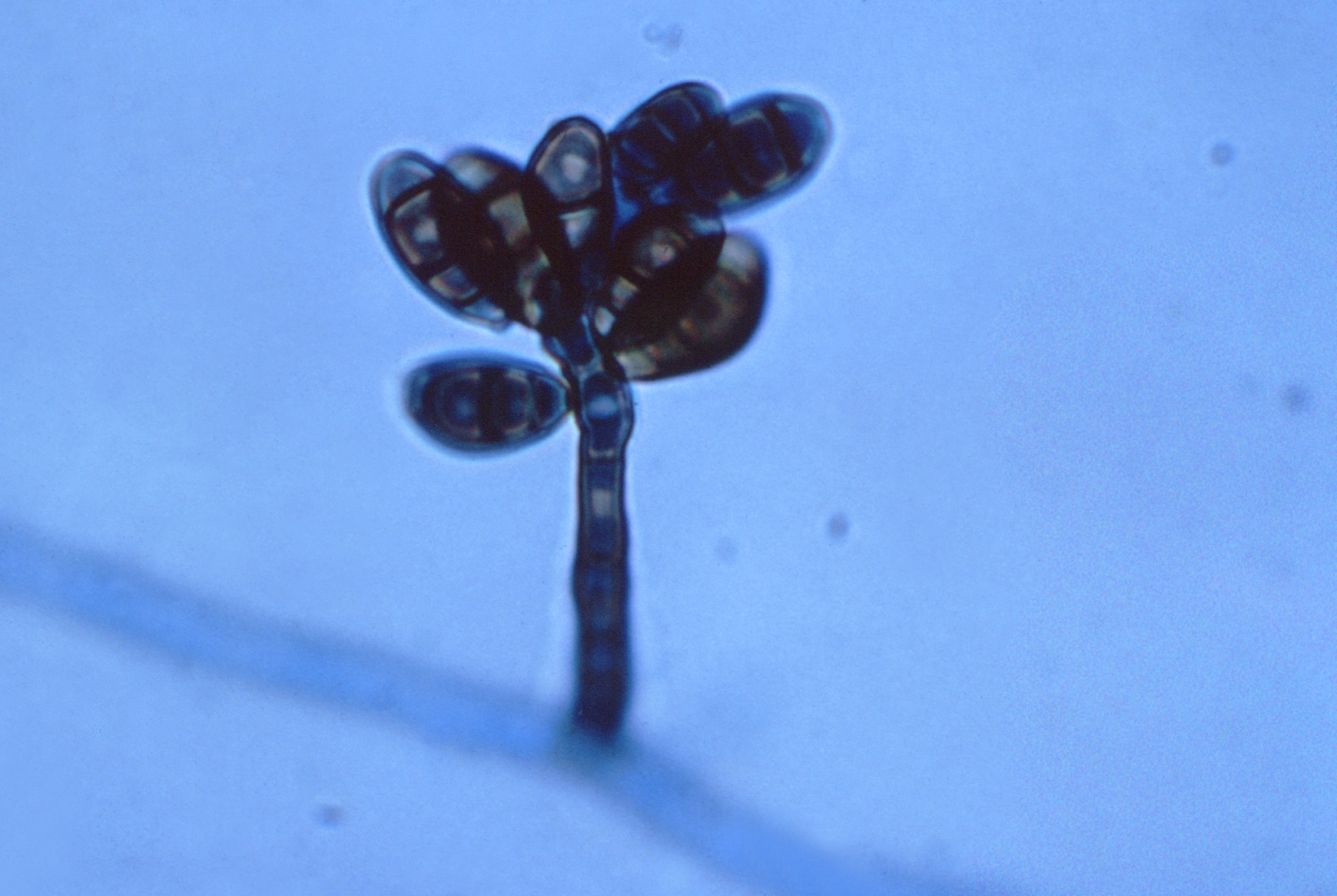
Curvularia geniculata

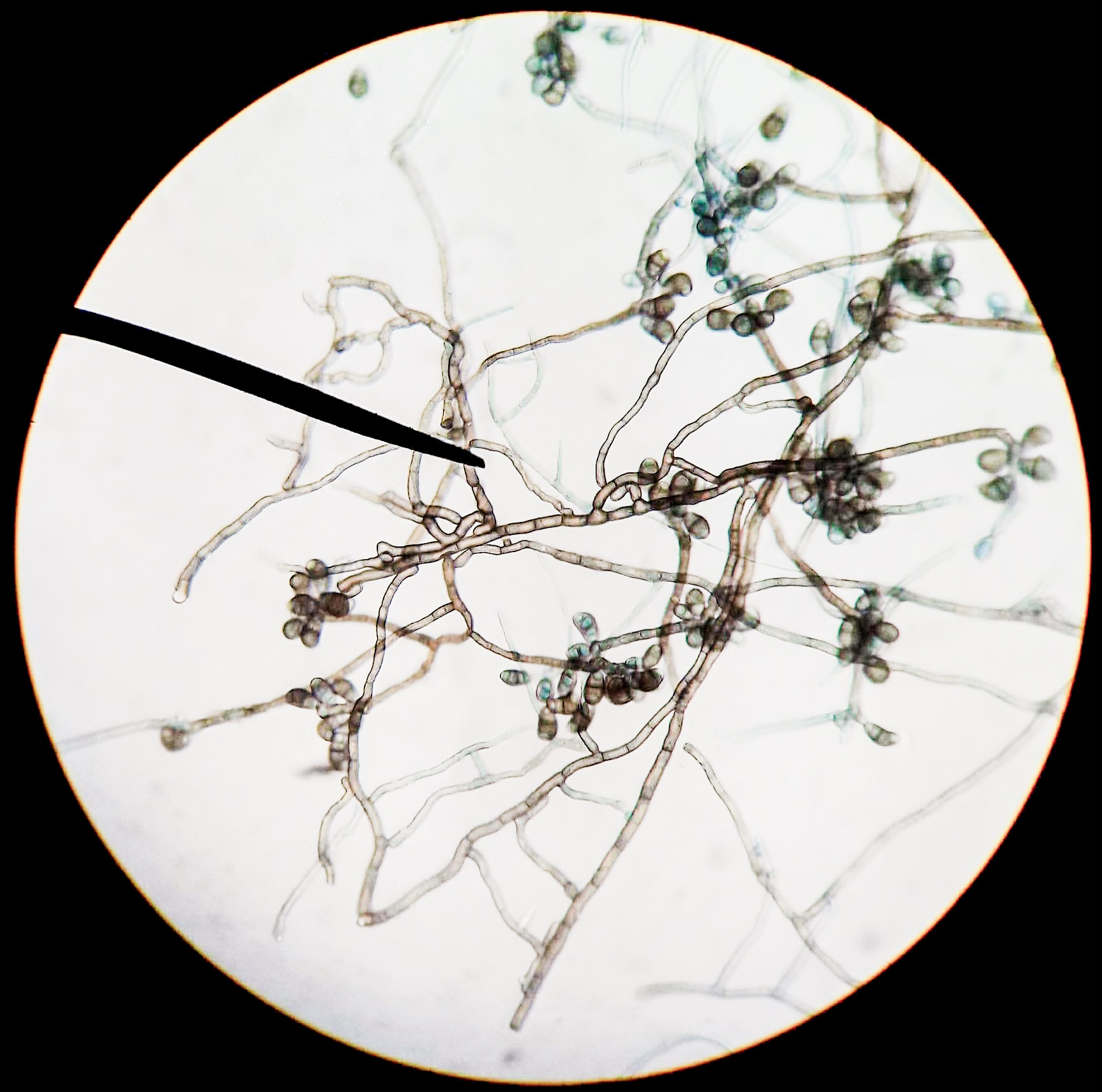
Curvularia lunata

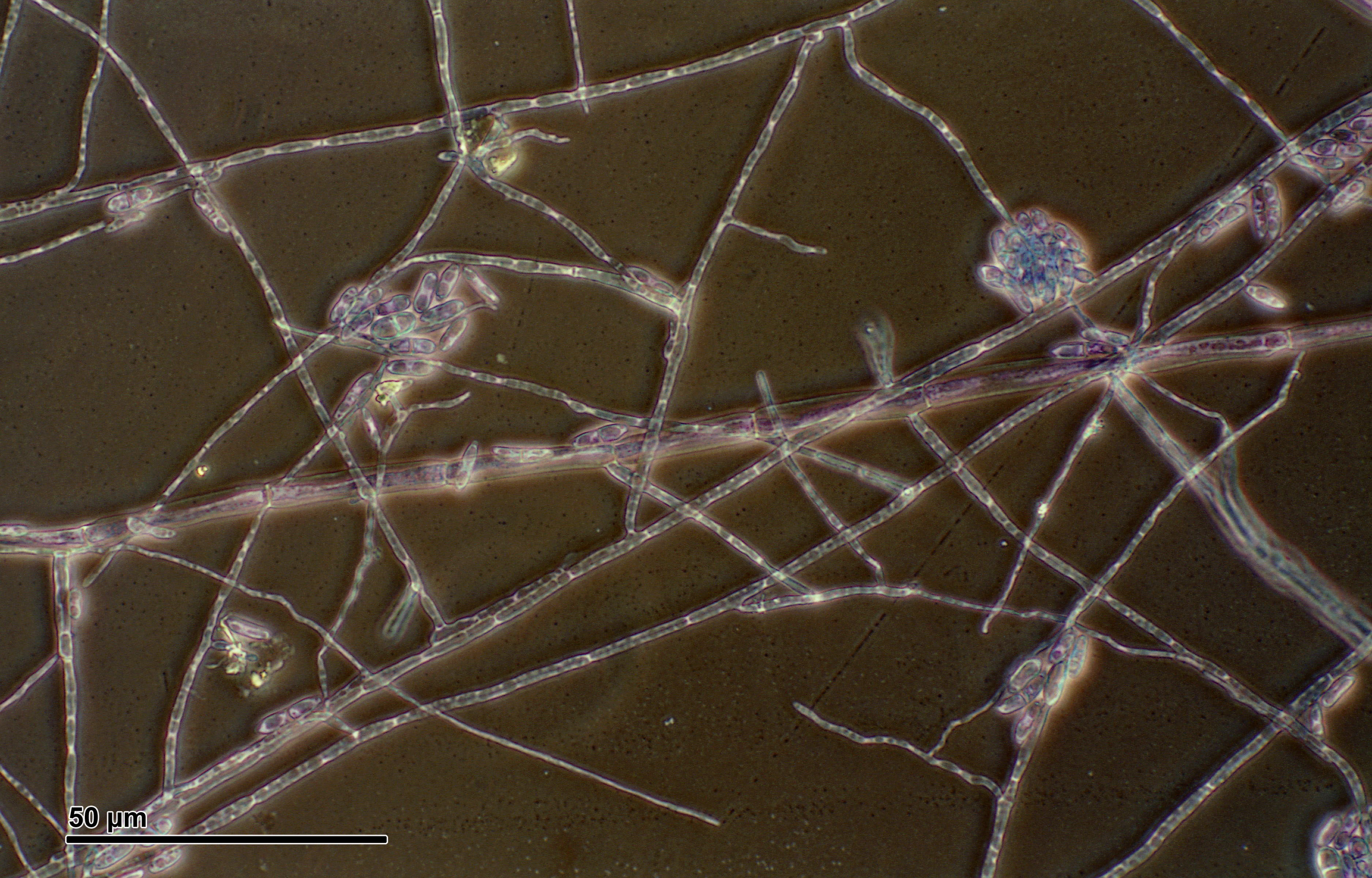
Fusarium solani

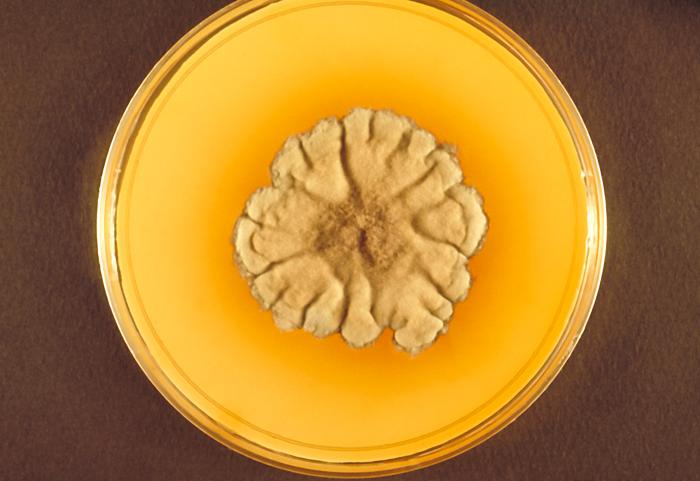
Madurella grisea

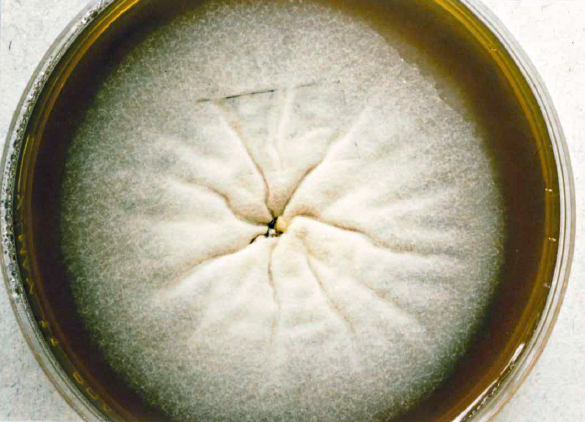
Madurella mycetomatis

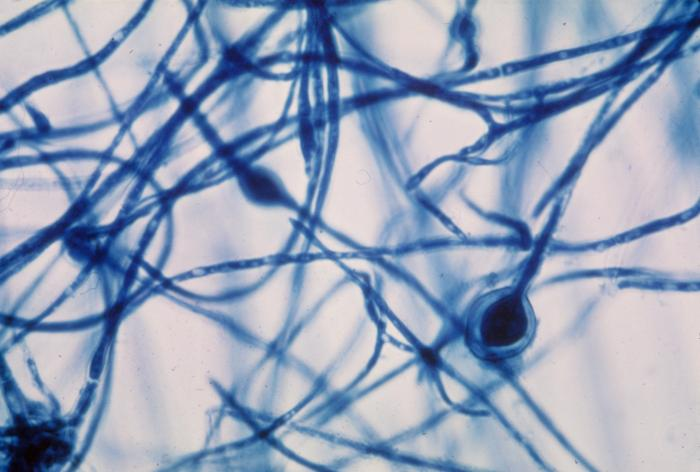
Microsporum audouinii

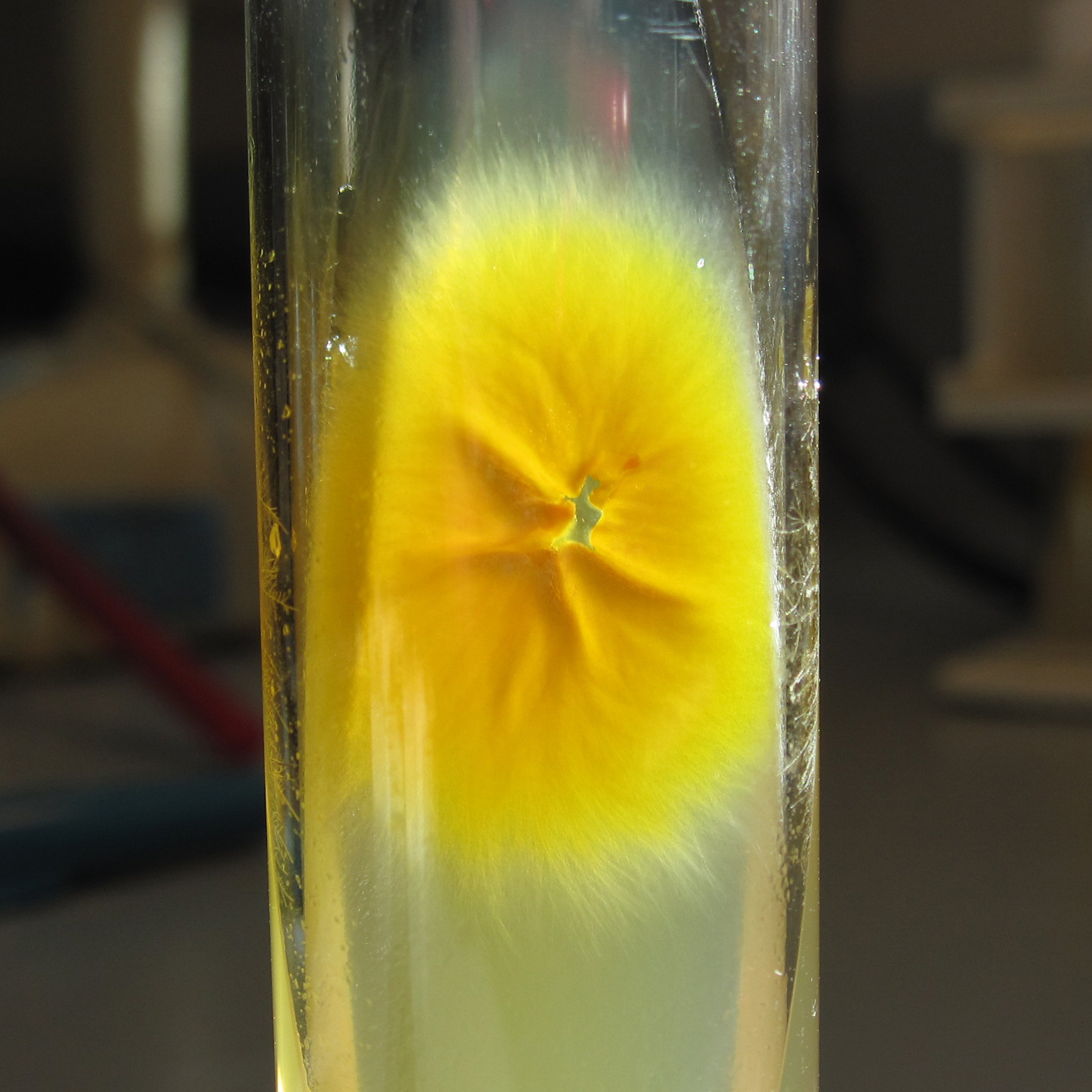
Microsporum canis

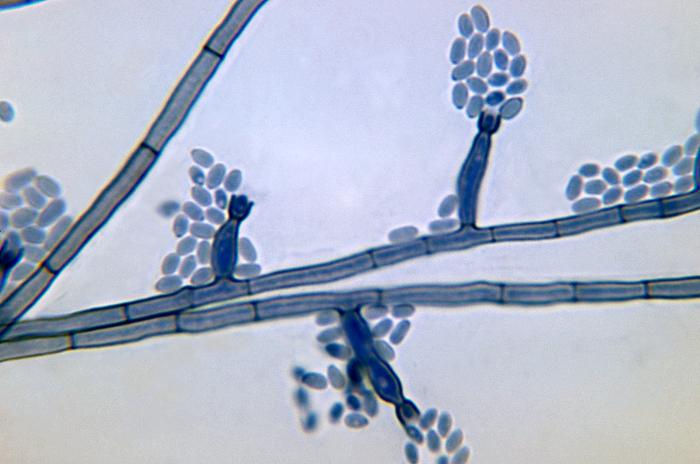
Phialophora verrucosa

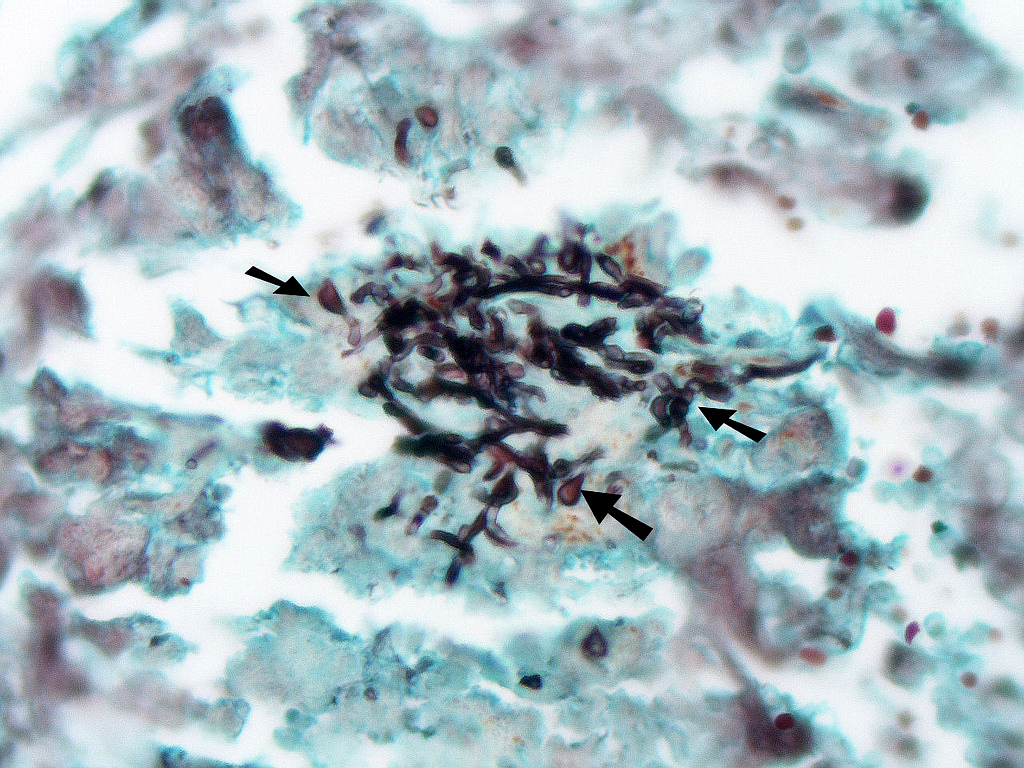
Pseudoallescheria boydii

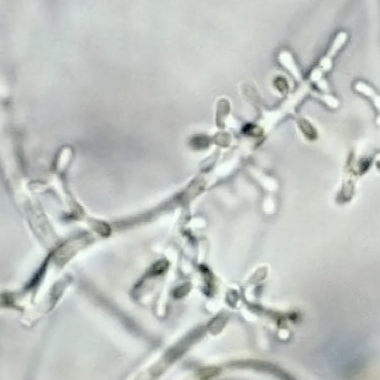
Trichophyton rubrum

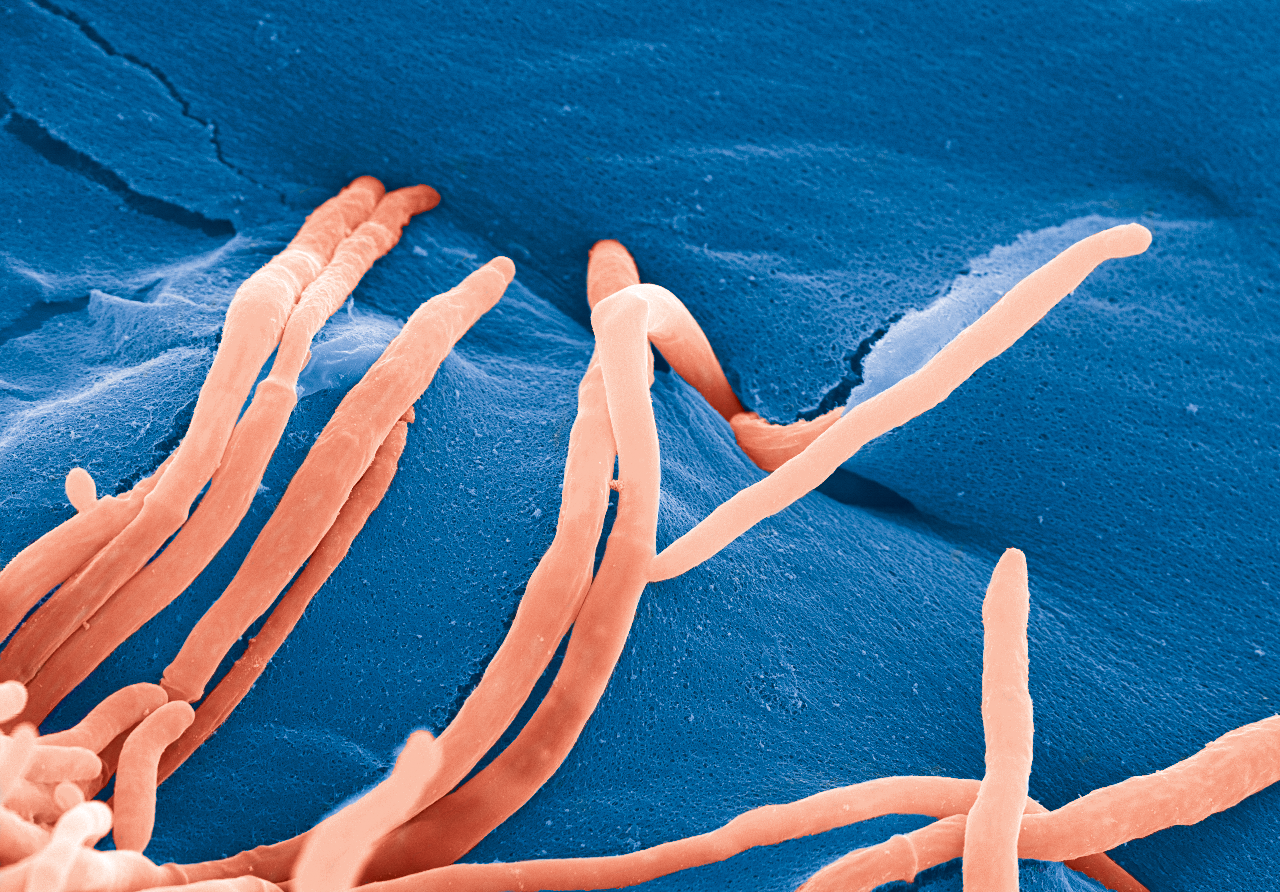
Candida tropicalis

== Medium group ==
- Scedosporium spp., including:
  - Scedosporium americanum
  - Scedosporium apiospermum
  - Scedosporium aurantiacum
  - Scedosporium boydii
  - Scedosporium cereisporum
  - Scedosporium deficiens
  - Scedosporium dehoogii
  - Scedosporium desertorum
  - Scedosporium magalhaesii
  - Scedosporium minutisporum
  - Scedosporium prolificans
  - Scedosporium rarisporum
  - Scedosporium sanyaense
- Lomentospora prolificans
- Coccidioides spp., including:
  - Coccidioides immitis
  - Coccidioides posadasii
- Pichia kudriavzevii (formerly Candida krusei)
- Cryptococcus gattii
- Talaromyces marneffei
- Pneumocystis jirovecii
- Paracoccidioides spp., including:
  - Paracoccidioides americana
  - Paracoccidioides brasiliensis
  - Paracoccidioides cerebriformis
  - Paracoccidioides ceti
  - Paracoccidioides lutzii
  - Paracoccidioides restrepoana
  - Paracoccidioides venezuelensis
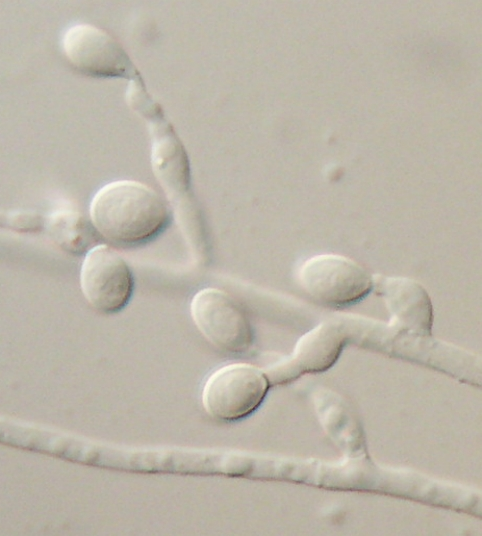
Scedosporium prolificans

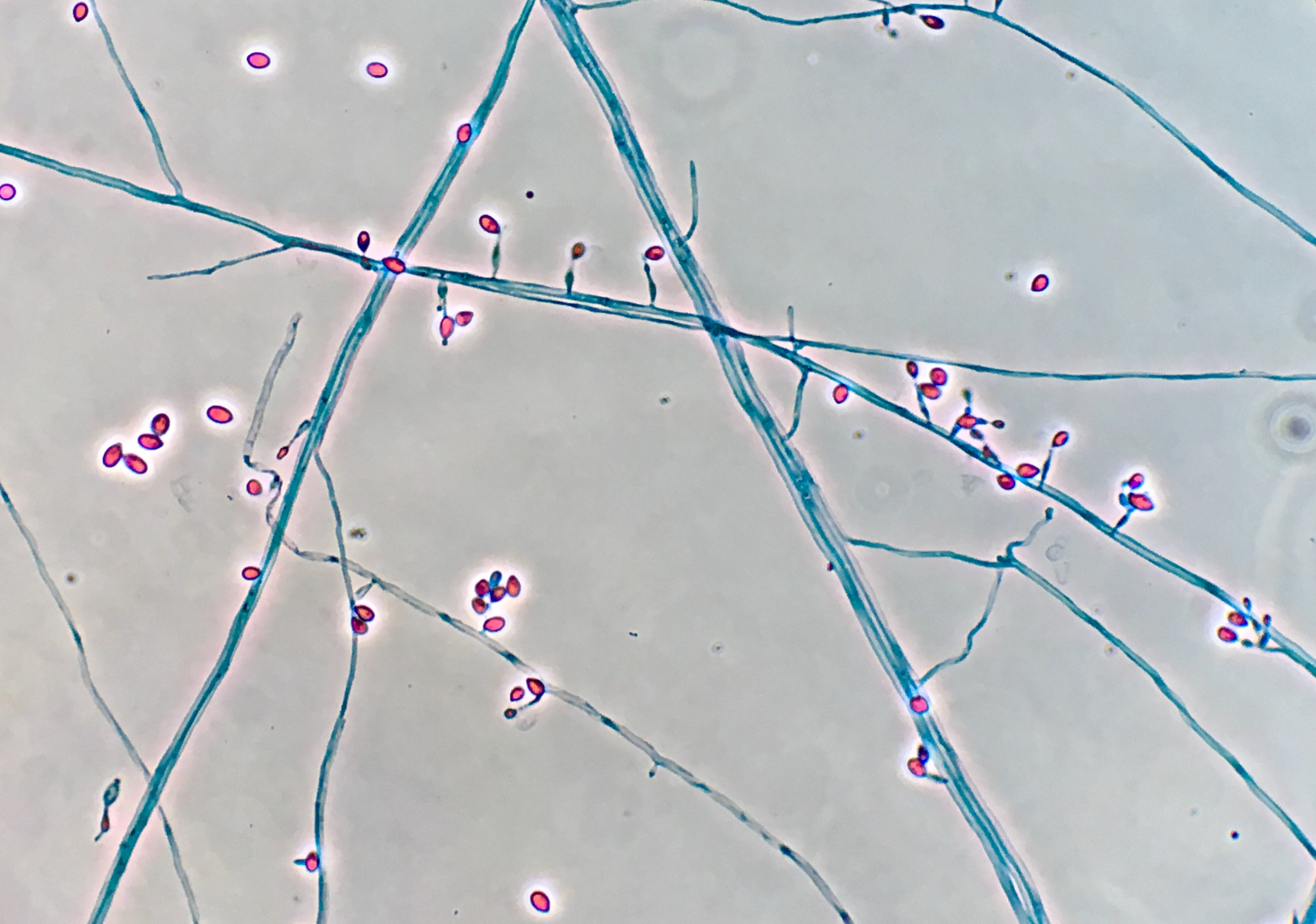
Lomentospora prolificans

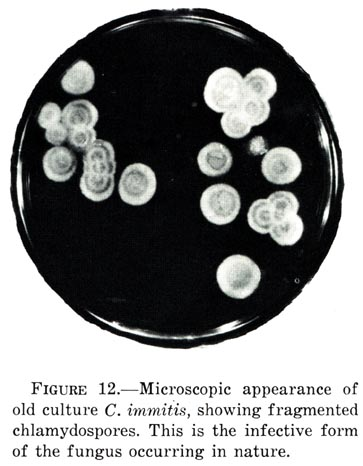
Coccidioides immitis

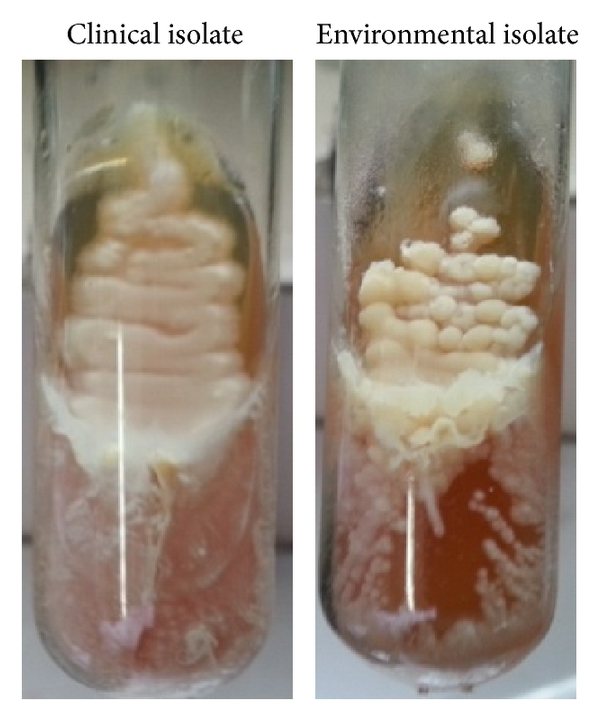
Pichia kudriavzevii

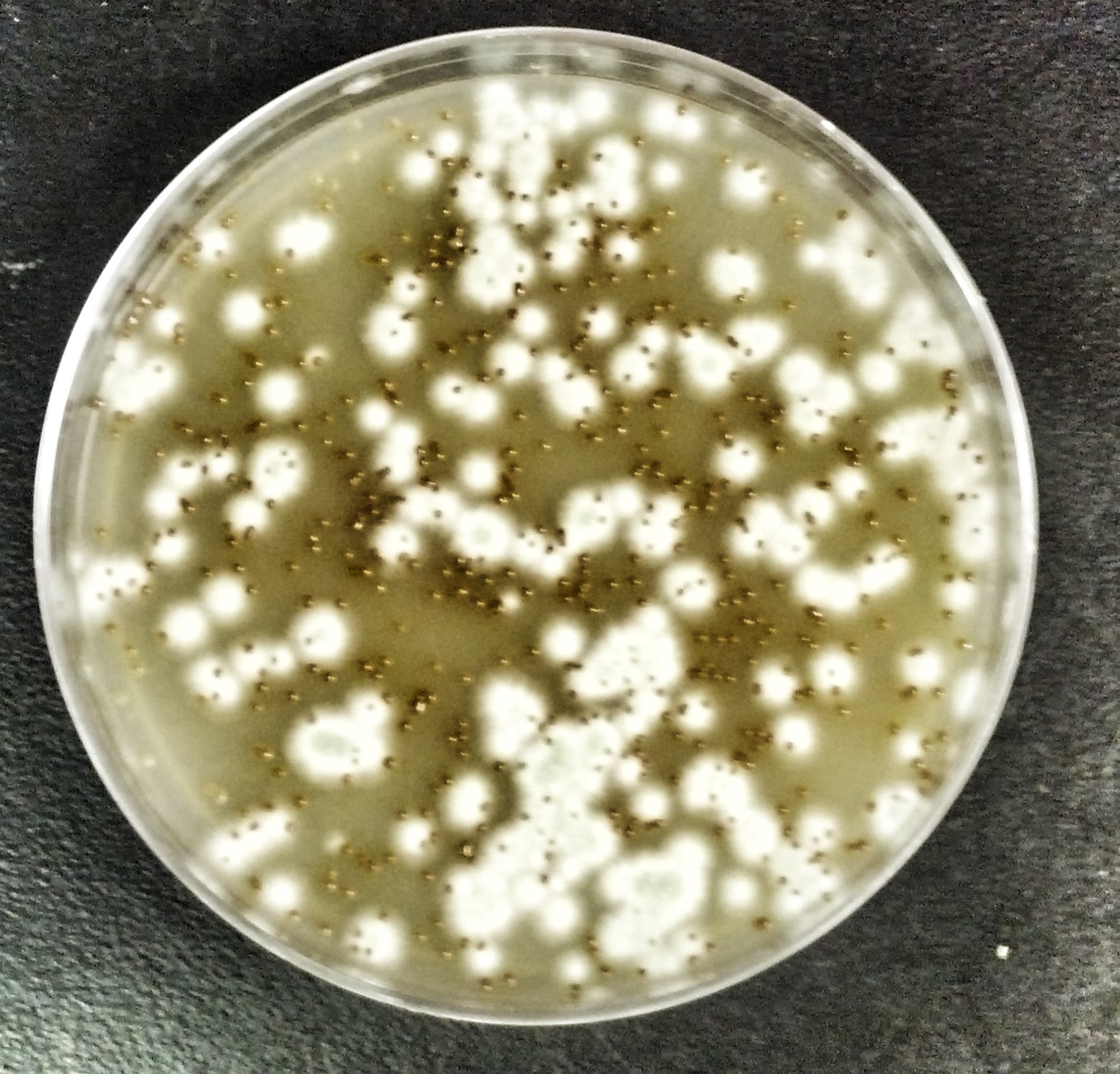
Cryptococcus gattii

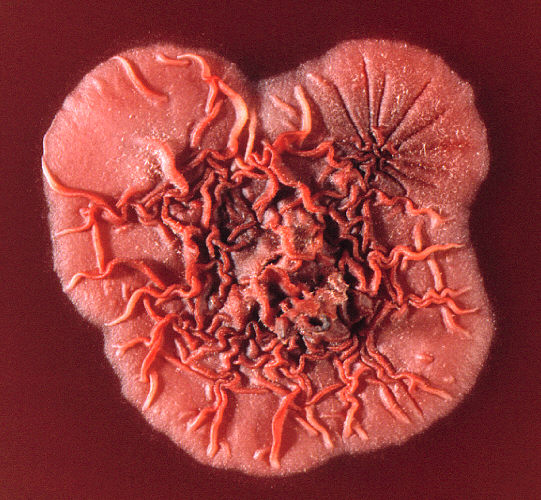
Talaromyces marneffei

Pneumocystis jirovecii

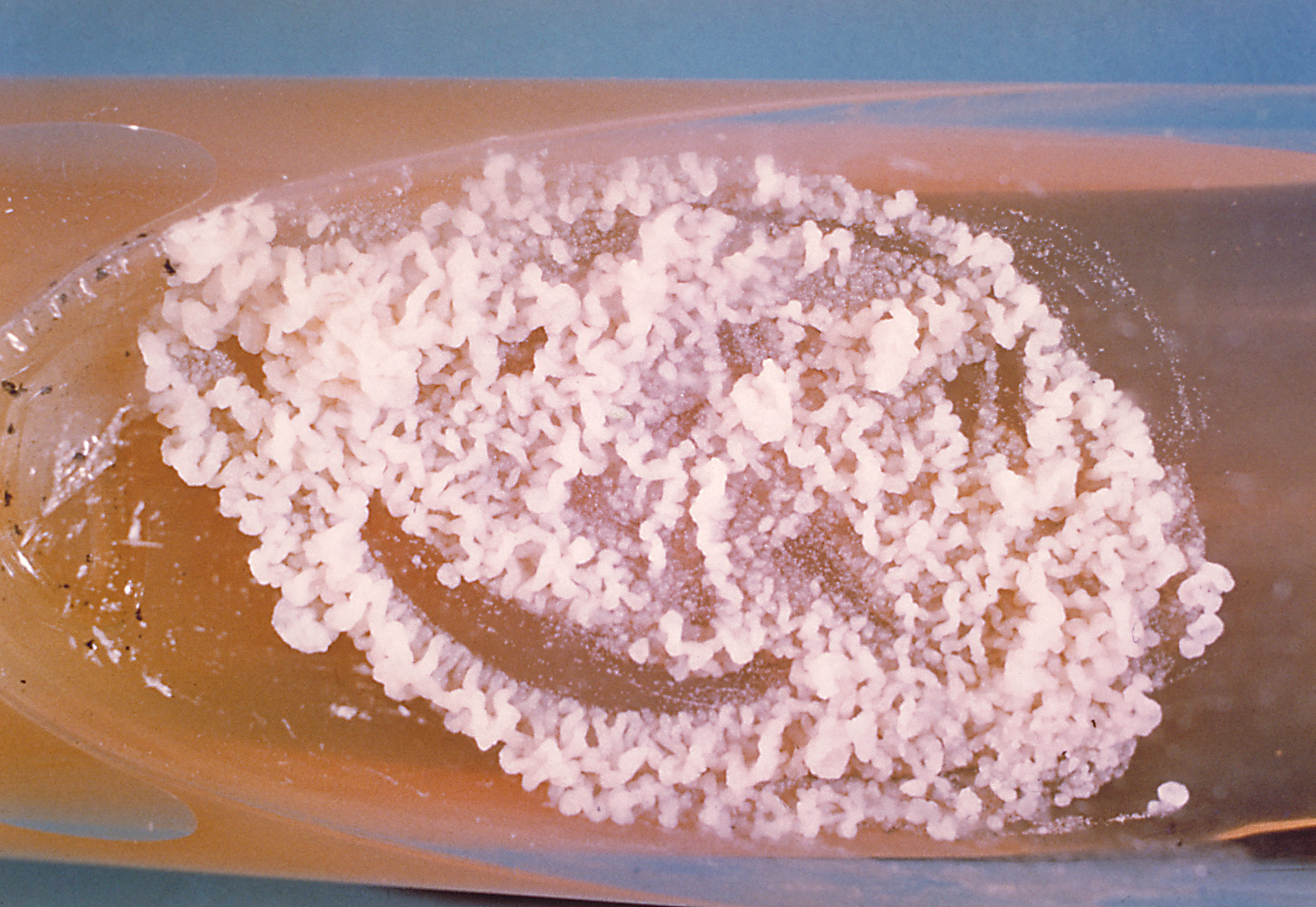
Paracoccidioides brasiliensis

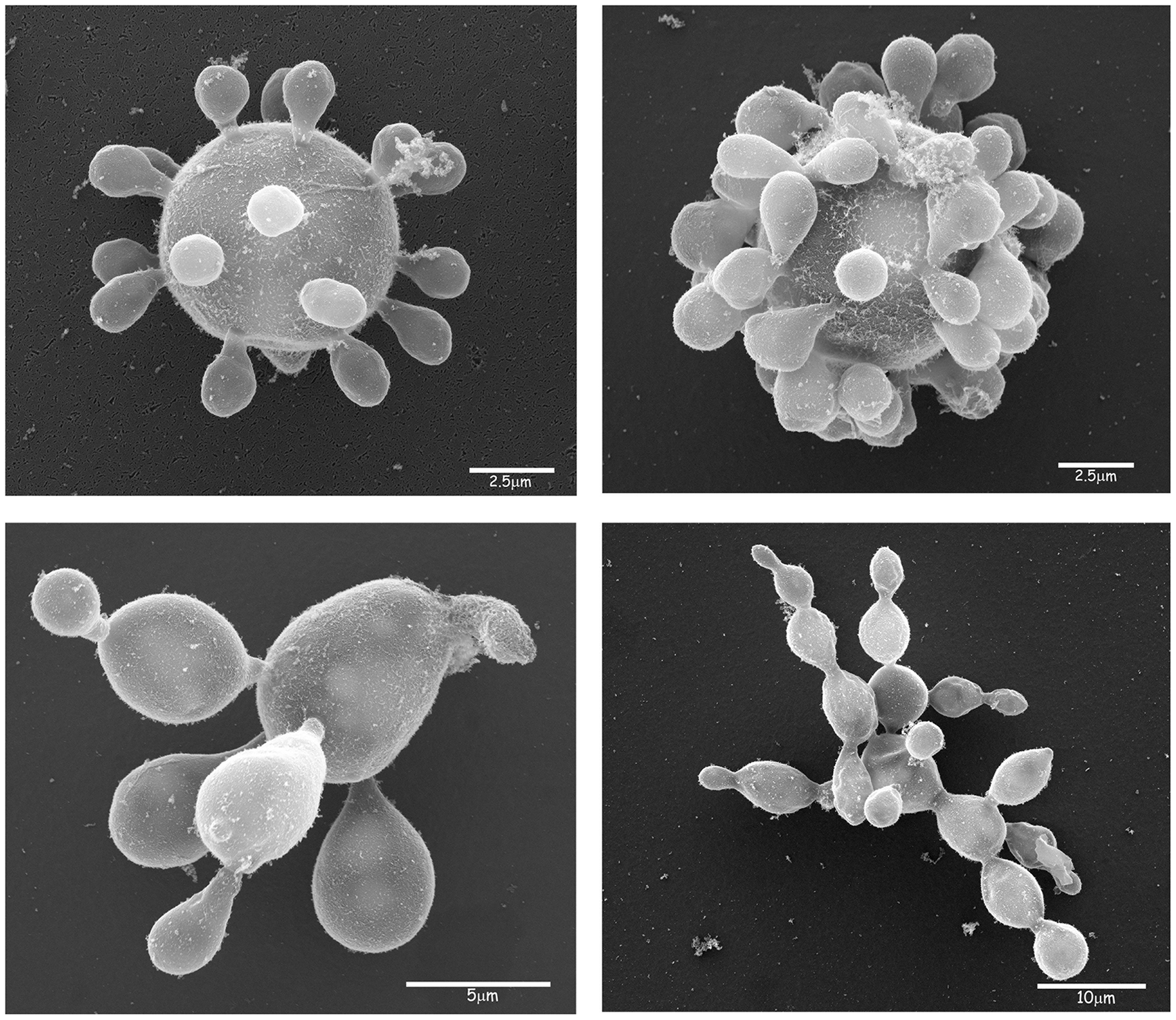
Paracoccidioides lutzii
