= Scedosporiosis =

- Specialty: Infectious disease, mycosis
- Types: localized, disseminated
- Causes: Scedosporium prolificans, Scedosporium apiospermum
- Risk factors: immunodeficiency, neutropenia, cancer
- Treatment: antifungal drugs, surgery
- Frequency: 0.0001%

Scedosporiosis is the general name for any mycosis – i.e., fungal infection – caused by a fungus from the genus Scedosporium. Current population-based studies suggest Scedosporium prolificans (also known and recently more commonly referred to as Lomentospora prolificans) and Scedosporium apiospermum to be among the most common infecting agents from the genus, although infections caused by other members thereof are not unheard of. The latter is an asexual form (anamorph) of another fungus, Pseudallescheria boydii. The former is a "black yeast" (aka dematiaceous fungus), currently not characterized as well, although both of them have been described as saprophytes.

The fungi of this genus are more and more recognized as significant human pathogens. S. apiospermum is described as an emerging and even an "underrated" opportunistic pathogen. It was reported in a 2003 US study that Scedosporiosis had been associated with 25% of all non-Aspergillus fungal infections for organ transplant patients. In a similar 2005 study scedosporal infections caused a 58% mortality rate for transplant recipients affected with it. Among the patients with cystic fibrosis, it is the second most common fungal infection. Moreover, a certain difficulty has been reported with correctly identifying the pathogen as, for example, scedosporal infections are in some cases almost indistinguishable from infections with other filamentous fungi, like the already-mentioned Aspergillus – this difficulty could have potentially contributed to the "underrating" of the pathogen. All of this, along with the wide resistance possessed by the pathogens to the antifungal therapies currently in medical use, presents the increased interest for researchers to further study the scedoporal infections and develop treatments.

== Background ==
First detectable description of a scedosporal disease arises in 1911 where S. apiospermum was identified as a cause of human mycetoma – a deep fungal subcutaneous infection. S. apiospermum is, indeed, not a recently discovered human pathogen and data about it have been aggregated over a period of more than 120 years. S. prolificans, on the other hand, was discovered more recently, in 1974, under the name L. prolificans.

There has been a series of name changes for both S. apiospermum and its teleomorph P. boydii. It has also been reported that at different timepoints, both, at some point, have been referred to as Petriellidium boydii, Allescheria boydii, Pseudallescheria sheari and Monosporium apiospermum. S. prolificans, likewise, went through a name change, and in the most recent literature, the original name L. prolificans is generally preferred as proposed by Lackner et al. in 2014.

The risk of misidentification of the fungi for other infecting agents is, as previously mentioned, extant and significant as a given treatment will be differently applicable to different fungal infections, especially considering resistance patterns. In 2002, a corneal disease case was reported wherein Acrophialophora fusispora was mistaken for S. prolifcans. The identification performed by the researchers based on the specifics of the pathogen's morphology was shown to be erroneous. In the correction to that particular case, a distinction was suggested based on the arrangement of cells and shape and color of conidia, however, in practice, difficulties therein still can persist.

S. apiospermum was found to be resistant to a wide range of the known antifungal drugs, displaying high minimal inhibitory concentration values to amphotericin B, isavuconazole and posaconazole, and is, to different extents, susceptible to voriconazole, micafungin and anidulafungin. S. prolificans was found to be consistently resistant to all of these drugs and the effectiveness of voriconazole against it in vitro is limited.

Interestingly, it was recently established that the growth S. prolificans can be inhibited by non-mucoid strains of Pseudomonas aeruginosa.

== Infection ==
Both S. apiospermum and S. prolificans are capable of causing a wide range of infections, both in immunocompromised and immunocompetent individuals. Infections arising therefrom can be both localized and disseminated.

It was reported that solid organ transplant and hematopoietic stem cell transplant patients are a significant proportion of those at risk of Scedosporium mycoses.

=== Localized mycosis ===
Localized scedosporiosis can occur in a vast range of internal organs and in joints and limbs. It can commonly be found on the surface of the skin in a form of white and yellow papules. Among the other most common manifestations would be mycetoma, specifically, eumycetoma (a mycetoma caused by a fungus), affecting subcutaneous tissue, joints and even muscles and bones, although foot or leg is a common location of such an infection. A typical cause could be an open wound or surgery and both immunocompetent and immunocompromised patients can develop the infection. Eumycetoma grows in a granular fashion, is usually painless at first and grows steadily, causing complications and even disability if left untreated. Osteomyelitis, particularly, sternal and lower rib bone infection, caused by S. apiospermum was reported in a successfully cured lung transplant patient in 2016.

Scedosporal eye infection, specifically, keratitis, arises usually after an injury of the cornea, both S. apiospermum and S. prolificans are known to be able to cause it. It presents itself in a form of painful lesions within the retina accompanied by symptoms like photophobia and blurred vision.

=== Disseminated mycosis ===
Severely immunocompromised patients, patients on immunosuppressive therapy, as well as those suffering from cancers including leukemia, have a risk of developing an infection that would constitute a spread of the extant localized infection throughout the organism. Additional and highly significant risk factor is neutropenia, found especially in leukemia patients.

Disseminated infections present a significant challenge to manage and result in consistently high mortality. Some studies suggest overall mortality rates for disseminated infections to be within 58-75%. A review of 25 cases published in 2006 reported mortality rates of disseminated infections with S. apiospermum and S. prolificans to be 70 and 100%, respectively. A 2002 review of 72 cases of disseminated phaeohyphomycosis reported poor outcomes for the antifungal treatment using amphotericin B with the overall mortality being 79% among all patients, with a likewise 100% mortality for infections by S. prolificans.

The culmination of disseminated scedosporiosis would be a highly fatal infection (>90% mortality rate) of the central nervous system. This development is possible in both immunocompromised and immunodeficient individuals. Studies report the former group develops the condition after a near-drowning experience in water contaminated with the pathogen's conidia. An extreme manifestation of this highly lethal case of scedosporiosis would be a brain abscess.

Reported as "most catastrophic", a systematic disseminated scedosporal infection happens after its infiltration of blood vessel and subsequent growth in tissues. In neutropenic patients and patients with HIV, this produces most severe case of the infection and fatality.

== Treatment ==
Effective treatment against scedosporiosis continues to present a challenge to modern medicine – as do many other fungal infections. It is still being researched and can vary depending on the localization and type of infection. Factors like immunodeficiency can significantly hinder the chances of a successful outcome. Studies suggest Voriconazole to be effective as clinical treatment for infections caused by S. apiospermum. A study of 107 patients with saw the treatment successfully working in 57% in patients infected with scedosporiosis with best effects in localized S. apiospermum skin and bone infections. A 2003 review confirms its effectiveness for treating invasive mycosis of S. apiospermum while also citing evidence for efficacy of ravuconazole. A 2007 case report likewise shows the effectiveness of voriconazole in a renal transplant patient with disseminated scedosporiosis.

In cases of S. apiospermum-caused mycetoma, a treatment constituting a combination of surgery and terbinafine was reported to be effective in 2017. An immunocompromised patient suffering from an intense subcutaneous infection in his right leg was successfully treated using this method.

S. prolificans treatment presents a more significant challenge due to its wider array of antifungal resistance. Localized limb infections might require extensive surgery or even amputation. A review of 162 cases of S. prolificans infection found no association with antifungal treatment (using then-currently available medications) and reduced risk of death. One study, however, argued for the efficiency of combination therapy using voriconazole and terbinafine to cure an orthopedic infection in a non-immunocompromised host without the need for a radical surgery.

More recent medical advances show hope for more efficient antifungal therapies, however, as novel drugs like Ibrexafungerp – a glucan synthase inhibitor – is somewhat effective in treating S. prolificans infections. Another drug, fosmanogepix, another fungal enzyme inhibitor, showed in vitro efficacy as treatment for scedosporiosis (including S. prolificans). Olorofim, a new dihydroorotate dehydrogenase inhibitor – which disrupts pyrimidine biosynthesis – is also deserving of the reader's attention as it showed efficacy against both S. prolificans and S. apiospermum as well as other fungi known to be universally resistant to known antifungal medications.

== See also ==
- Aspergillosis
- Mycetoma
- Mycosis
- Immunodeficiency
