= Orotomide =

Class of chemical compounds

Chemical structure of the orotomide F901318

Orotomides are a class of experimental antifungals. They were discovered in 2015 by British scientists at the pharmaceutical company F2G Ltd. while searching for a new drug for Aspergillus infection. The discovery was formally announced at the Interscience Conference on Antimicrobial Agents and Chemotherapy (ICAAC) 55th meeting during 17-21 September 2015 at San Diego, California, and published the next year in the Proceedings of the National Academy of Sciences. It was found to be effective against most important human fungal infections including those with Aspergillus, Lemontospora (Scedosporium) prolificans, Fusarium, Penicillium spp., and Taloromyces. The most promising drug candidate is designated F901318, chemical name 2-(1,5-dimethyl-3-phenyl-1H-pyrrol-2-yl)-N-{4-[4-(5-fluoro-pyrimidin-2-yl)piperazin-1-yl]-phenyl}-2-oxo-acetamide. F901318 has been named Olorofim.

Unlike other antifungal drugs, the orotomides act differently by stopping pyrimidine biosynthesis in fungal cells. They cause reversible inhibition of dihydroorotate dehydrogenase (DHODH), an enzyme that catalyses dihydroorotate to orotate. This inhibition in turn block the growth of hyphae. This unique action makes it more effective than other antifungal drugs. Originally named the F3 series, the name was changed to orotomides, combining the names of the compound (dihydroorotate) they acted upon with the chemical group (α-ketoamide) which they belong to.

The European Medicines Agency (EMA) Committee for Orphan Medicinal Products granted orphan designation to F2G for F901318 for the treatment of scedosporiosis on 29 August 2016, and for invasive aspergillosis on 14 October 2016. As of May 2017, F901318 is in late phase 1 clinical trials. It was shown to be useful for acute sinopulmonary aspergillosis caused by Aspergillus flavus.
