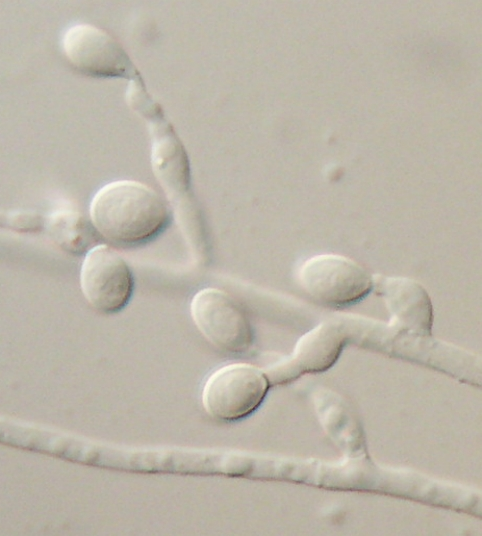
- Photomicrograph of Scedosporium prolificans colony growing on Modified Leonian's agar

Scientific classification
- Kingdom: Fungi
- Division: Ascomycota
- Class: Sordariomycetes
- Order: Microascales
- Family: Microascaceae
- Genus: Scedosporium; Sacc. ex Castell. & Chalm.

= Scedosporium =

Genus of fungi

Scedosporium is a genus of fungi in the family Microascaceae.

The genus shed the alternative name Pseudallescheria as the "One Fungus, One Name" principle overtook the previous dual naming system, which had a distinct name for the anamorph and teleomorph.

== Species and species complexes ==
The following are based on Ramirez-Garcia et al., 2018

- Scedosporium apiospermum Species complex
  - Scedosporium angustum
  - Scedosporium apiospermum
  - Scedosporium boydii Species complex
  - Scedosporium ellipsoideum
  - Scedosporium fusarium
- Scedosporium prolificans
- Scedosporium aurantiacum
- Scedosporium minutisporum
- Scedosporium desertorum
- Scedosporium cereisporum
- Scedosporium dehoogii Species complex

== See also ==
- Scedosporiosis
- Pseudallescheria
