= Dihydroorotate dehydrogenase (quinone) =

Class of enzymes

Dihydroorotate:quinone oxidoreductase

Identifiers
- EC no.: 1.3.5.2
- CAS no.: 59088-23-2

Databases
- IntEnz: IntEnz view
- BRENDA: BRENDA entry
- ExPASy: NiceZyme view
- KEGG: KEGG entry
- MetaCyc: metabolic pathway
- PRIAM: profile
- PDB structures: RCSB PDB PDBe PDBsum
Search
- PMC: articles
- PubMed: articles
- NCBI: proteins

Class 2 dihydroorotate dehydrogenases (DHOQO, EC 1.3.5.2) is an enzyme with systematic name (S)-dihydroorotate:quinone oxidoreductase. This enzyme catalyses the electron transfer from dihydroorotic acid (electron donor) to a quinone (electron acceptor):

(S)-dihydroorotic acid
+ a quinone
orotic acid
+ a quinol

These enzymes differ from class 1 dihydroorotate dehydrogenases (DHODH) on the electron acceptor, on their structure, and on their cellular localization. Since the reaction catalyzed by DHOQOs is both part of the electron transport chain and the pyrimidine de novo synthesis, it has been explored as a possible target for cancer treatment, immunological disorders and bacterial/viral infections.

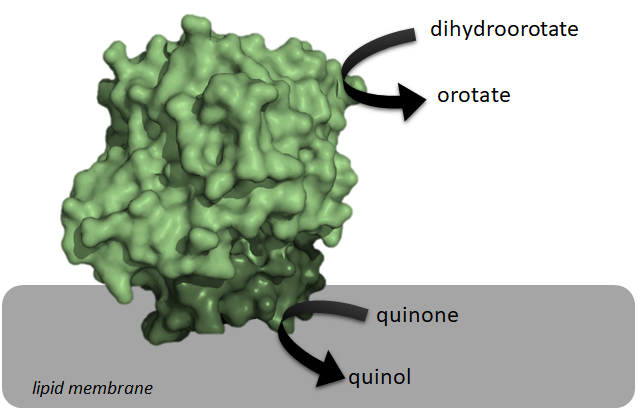
Enzymatic reaction catalyzed by DHOQO. In green is represented the protein surface, sitting in the membrane (in gray)

== Structure ==
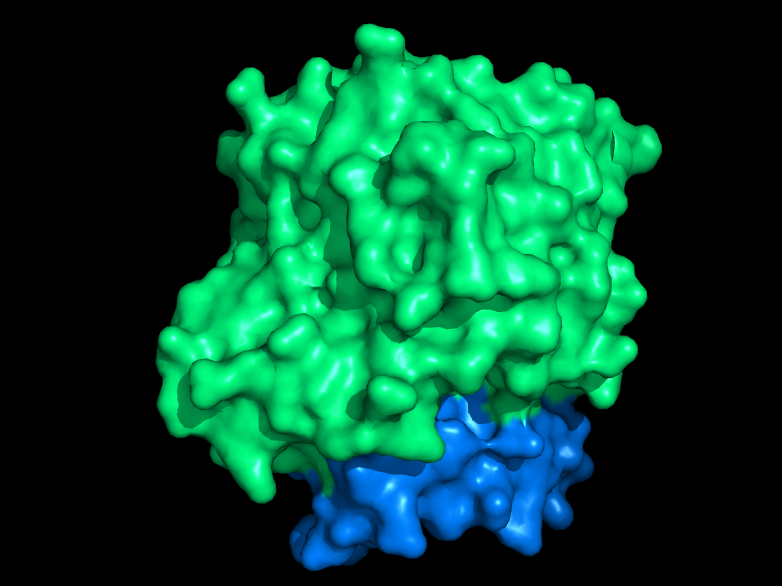
DHOQO structure colored by domains: N-terminal (blue) and core domain (green).

Structurally, DHOQOs are organized in monomers which adopt a (βα)8 (eightfold beta alpha barrel) fold. The enzyme can be separated in its N-terminal domain (blue in the figure) and in its C-terminal domain (green in the figure).

The N-terminal domain is composed of two amphipathic α-helices (αA – αB) which are responsible for the lipid membrane interaction. This region of the protein is also thought to mediate quinone binding.

Regarding the C-terminal domain, much of its structural elements are shared with the soluble counterparts of DHOQOs. This domain is responsible for the binding of the cofactor FMN (making these enzymes part of the Flavoprotein super-family) and the electron donor dihydroorotate, close to the 8 β-strand core.

There are currently crystallographic structures of DHOQOs from 5 different organisms:

- Escherichia coli (example PDB:1F76)
- Mycobacterium tuberculosis (example PDB: 4XQ6)
- Homo sapiens (example PDB:4IGH)
- Rattus norvegicus (example PDB: 4ORI)
- Plasmodium falciparum (example PDB: 1TV5)
