= Olorofim =

Chemical compound

Clinical data
- Other names: F901318

Legal status
- Legal status: Investigational

Identifiers
- IUPAC name: 2-(1,5-Dimethyl-3-phenylpyrrol-2-yl)-N-[4-[4-(5-fluoropyrimidin-2-yl)piperazin-1-yl]phenyl]-2-oxoacetamide
- CAS Number: 1928707-56-5
- PubChem CID: 91885568
- UNII: T34SH2H9HI

Chemical and physical data
- Formula: C_{28}H_{27}FN_{6}O_{2}
- Molar mass: 498.562 g·mol^{−1}

Olorofim (F901318) is an experimental antifungal drug being developed for invasive mold infections. If approved it would be a first-in-class medication (for the orotomide class). In 2023, the FDA decided not to approve the drug and to request more data about the safety of the drug. Olorofim does not inhibit growth of Candida species.
