= Pseudallescheria =

Scientific classification
- Domain: Eukaryota
- Kingdom: Fungi
- Division: Ascomycota
- Class: Sordariomycetes
- Order: Microascales
- Family: Microascaceae
- Genus: Pseudallescheria; Negroni & I. Fisch.

Type species
- Pseudallescheria shearii Negroni & I. Fisch.

Species
- P. angusta P. boydii P. desertorum P. ellipsoidea P. fusoidea P. shearii

Genus of fungi

Pseudallescheria is a genus of fungi in the family Microascaceae.

== See also ==
- Pseudallescheriasis
