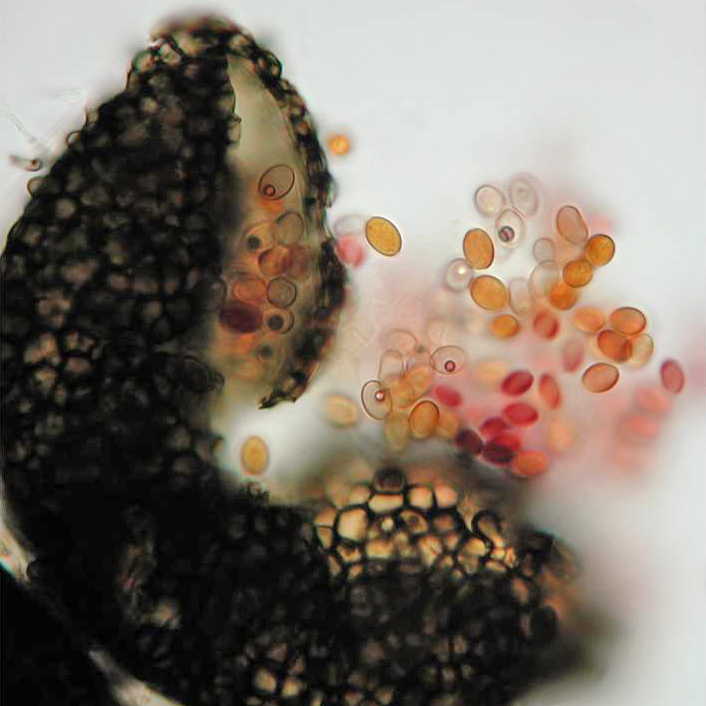
- Crushed cleistothecium of Pseudallescheria boydii mounted in Melzer's reagent, showing dextrinoid reaction of ascospores

Scientific classification
- Kingdom: Fungi
- Division: Ascomycota
- Class: Sordariomycetes
- Order: Microascales
- Family: Microascaceae
- Genus: Pseudallescheria
- Species: P. boydii

Binomial name
- Pseudallescheria boydii (Shear) McGinnis, A.A.Padhye & Ajello (1982)

Synonyms
- Allescheria boydii Shear (1922); Petriellidium boydii (Shear) Malloch (1970); Verticillium graphii Harz & Bezold (1889); Sporocybe chartoikoon Beij. (1913); Acladium castellanii Pinoy (1916); Pseudallescheria shearii Negroni & I.Fisch. (1944); Scedosporium boydii

= Pseudallescheria boydii =

Species of fungus

Pseudallescheria boydii is a species of fungus classified in the Ascomycota. It is associated with some forms of eumycetoma/maduromycosis and is the causative agent of pseudallescheriasis. Typically found in stagnant and polluted water, it has been implicated in the infection of immunocompromised and near-drowned pneumonia patients. Treatment of infections with P. boydii is complicated by resistance to many of the standard antifungal agents normally used to treat infections by filamentous fungi.

Fungal pneumonia caused by this mold was the cause of death in three athletes submerged in the Yarkon River after a bridge collapsed during the 1997 Maccabiah Games.

== Taxonomy ==
The fungus was originally described by American mycologist Cornelius Lott Shear in 1922 as a species of Allescheria. Shear obtained cultures from a patient of the Medical Department of the University of Texas. The microbe was apparently associated with a penetrating thorn the patient had incurred in his ankle while running barefoot 12 years before. The diseased area was found to contain hyphae-containing granules that, when cultured, led to the growth of the organism. Shear considered the fungus most closely related to Eurotiopsis gayoni (now called Allescheria gayoni). The specific epithet boydii refers to Dr. Mark F. Boyd, who sent Lott the specimen. David Malloch moved the species to the newly created genus Petriellidium in 1970. The genus name of Petriellidium was in honour of Lionello Petri (1875-1946), who was an Italian botanist (Mycology) and Phytopathologist from Florence. The species was then transferred to the genus Pseudallescheria in 1982 when examination of the type specimens of Petriellidium and Pseudallescheria revealed that they were the same genus.

== Ecology ==
An ability to tolerate minimal aeration and high osmotic pressure enables P. boydii to grow on soil, polluted and stagnant water and manure. Although this fungus is commonly found in temperate climates, it is thermotolerant and can survive in tropical climates and in environments with low oxygen pressure. Growth of P. boydii can be seen in environments where nitrogen-containing compounds are common, usually due to human pollution. Its ability to use natural gas and other volatile organic compounds suggests a capacity for bioremediation.

== Growth and morphology ==
Pseudallescheria boydii is a saprotrophic fungus with broad hyphae growing up to 2–5 μm in width. Colonies change in colour from white to pale brown and develop a cottony texture with maturity. After a 2–3 week incubation period, cleistothecia may form containing asci filled with eight fusiform, one-celled ascospores measuring 12–18 × 9–13 μm in diameter. This fungus grows on most standard media, maturing in 7 days. Its primary nutrients are the sugars xylose, arabinose, glucose, sucrose, ribitol, xylitol and L-arabinitol. It cannot assimilate maltose or lactose; however, it is able to assimilate urea, asparagine, potassium nitrate and ammonium nitrate. The optimal temperature for growth is 25 °C (77 °F) and the fungus is generally considered to be mesophilic, although it can grow at higher temperatures (up to 37 °C (99 °F)) as well. Asexual reproduction manifests in one of two forms: the Scedosporium type (the most common type) and the Graphium type. Scedosporium apiospermum forms greyish-white colonies with a grey-black reverse. The conidia are single-celled, pale brown and oval in form. Their size ranges from 4–9 x 6–10 μm and their development is annellidic.

== Pathogenicity ==
Pseudallescheria boydii is an emerging opportunistic pathogen. Immune response is characterized by TLR2 recognition of P. boydii derived α-glucans, while TLR4 mediates the recognition of P. boydii derived rhamnomannans. Human infection takes one of two forms: mycetoma (99% of infections), a chronic, subcutaneous disease, and pseudallescheriasis, which includes all other forms of the disease commonly presented in the central nervous system, lungs, joints and bone. The former can also be distinguished by the presence of sclerotia, or granules, which are typically absent in pseudallescheriasis-type infections. Infection is initiated via inhalation or traumatic implantation in the skin. Infection can lead to arthritis, otitis, endocarditis, sinusitis, and other manifestations. Masses of hyphae can form "fungus balls" in the lungs. While "fungus balls" can also form in other organs, they are commonly derived from host necrotic tissue resulting from nodular infarction and thrombosis of lung vessels following infection.

This species is second in prevalence after Aspergillus fumigatus as a fungal pathogen in cystic fibrosis patients. It causes allergic bronchopulmonary disease and chronic lung lesions that resemble aspergillosis. Infections can also occur in immunocompetent individuals, usually in the lungs and upper respiratory tract. Infections in the CNS, which are rare, present as neutrophilic meningitis or multiple brain abscesses and have a mortality rate of up to 75%. Infections have also been observed in animals, notably corneal infection, abdominal mycetoma and disseminated infections in dogs and horses. Transient colonization is more likely than disease. However, invasive pseudoallescheriasis can be found in patients with prolonged neutropenia, high-dose corticosteroid therapy and allotransplantation of bone marrow. Pseudallescheria boydii has also been implicated in pneumonia subsequent to near-drowning events with infection developing anywhere between a few weeks to several months after exposure yielding high mortality. Dissemination of the organism to the central nervous system has been observed in some cases. This species is also known as a non-invasive colonist of the external ear and airways of patients with poor lung or sinus clearance, and the first documented case of human pseudallescheriasis involved the ear canal. It has also been implicated in infection of joints following traumatic injury, and these infections can progress to osteomyelitis. Infections of the skin and cornea have also been reported. Typical host-related risk factors for infection include lymphopenia, steroid treatment, serum albumin levels of < 3 mg/dL and neutropenia.

== Diagnosis ==
Detection and diagnosis of S. apiospermum is possible through isolation of the fungus in culture or through cytology and histopathology in the tissues of diseased individuals. In mycetoma-type infections, a confluence of symptoms is necessary for diagnosis, including tumefaction, draining sinuses and extrusion of grains. Furthermore, P. boydii grains and hyphae should be cultured and observed microscopically after staining with H&E, periodic acid–Schiff stain, Tissue Gram or Grocott's methenamine silver stain. A radiological diagnosis may be helpful in elucidating the extent of the disease in terms of bone and soft tissue involvement. Scedosporium-caused eumycetomas have been found to have thick-walled cavities and grains appearing as hyperreflective echoes on scans, while actinomycetomas show fine echoes at the bottom of cavities.

Direct detection is possible in samples histochemically stained in 20% KOH followed by fluorescence microscopy with antibody. The characteristic shape, texture and colour of tissues can help identify S. apiospermum grains, which are often surrounded by an eosinophilic zone. Histopathologically, hyalohyphomycotic fungi like Scedosporium spp., Aspergillus spp., Fusarium spp. and Petriella spp. are similar in that they show septation of hyphae at regular intervals, have dichotomous branching and invade blood vessels. However, Scedosporium presents more irregular branching, sometimes with terminal or intercalary chlamydospores. In serum, Scedosporium infections can be detected by counterimmunoelectrophoresis. Molecular diagnostics appear to be promising in complementing current conventional diagnostic methods.

Culture detection is accomplished by rinsing "grains" in 70% ethanol and sterile saline solution to avoid bacterial contamination prior to inoculation on growth medium. Selection of Scedosporium growth can be achieved on Leonian's agar supplemented with 10 g/mL benomyl, or on media containing cycloheximide or amphotericin B. Optimal incubation is at a temperature of 25–35 °C (77–95 °F).

== Treatment ==
Pseudallescheria boydii is resistant to amphotericin B and nearly all other antifungal drugs. Consequently, there is currently no consistently effective antifungal therapy for this agent. Miconazole has shown the best in vivo activity; however, itraconazole, fluconazole, ketoconazole and voriconazole have also been used in treatment, albeit with less success. In an in vitro environment, terbinafine has been found to work in synergy with azoles against P. boydii. Echinocandins, such as caspofungin and sordarins, have shown promise in in vitro assays. CMT-3, a chemically modified tetracycline, has also shown to be active in vitro against P. boydii.

== Epidemiology ==
In the United States, P. boydii is the most common causal agent of eumycetoma, and tends to be more common in men than in women, particularly in the 20- to 45-year-old age group. In the United States, the incidence of infection by S. apiospermum between 1993 and 1998 was 0.82 per 100,000 patient-inpatient days; this figure increased to 1.33 per 100,000 patient-inpatient days by 2005. In Thailand, 18 people died of the fungus between 1953 and 2004 .

== Society and culture ==
This fungus is implicated in the deaths of three athletes injured during the opening ceremony of the 1997 Maccabiah Games when the Maccabiah bridge collapsed in the Yarkon River.

In 2007, Thai singer Apichet Kittikorncharoen died due to a brain infection caused by this mold which developed after a 2003 car accident in which he fell in a canal in Bangkok, Thailand. This event has sparked a public outcry over pollution in Bangkok's canals .
