= Pyrenotrichaceae =

Scientific classification
- Kingdom: Fungi
- Division: Ascomycota
- Class: Eurotiomycetes
- Order: Chaetothyriales
- Family: Pyrenotrichaceae; Zahlbr. (1926)

Type genus
- Pyrenothrix Riddle (1917)

Genera
- Pyrenothrix; Neophaeococcomyces

Family of fungi

The Pyrenotrichaceae are a small family of fungi in the order Chaetothyriales. It contains two genera, and a total of six species. The genus Pyrenothrix has two species of bark- or leaf-dwelling lichens, while Neophaeococcomyces has four species of saprobic fungi.

== Taxonomy ==
The family (originally spelled as Pyrenothricaceae) was proposed by the lichenologist Alexander Zahlbruckner in 1926 to contain the genera Pyrenothrix and Cyanoporina. Because of the presence of perithecia in this Pyrenothrix species, Aino Henssen suggested that the genus should be in the order Pleosporales in 1964. Ove Eriksson challenged Henssen's classification of Pyrenothrix in 1981, proposing instead that it was closely related to the sooty molds, specifically the family Coccodiniaceae. This repositioning aligns with the characteristics of a filamentous thallus and perithecia, placing Pyrenothrix within the order Chaetothyriales. He classified Pyrenothrichaceae under the class Chaetothyriomycetes and Dothideomycetes incertae sedis in 2004. In a 2005 publication, Herrera-Campos and colleagues, describing a second species of Pyrenothrix, proposed including the genus in Chaetothyriales based on the simple perithecial wall characteristic of the genus. Although DNA sequences for species of Pyrenotrichaceae are lacking, the placement of the family in the Chaetothyriales has been later followed by subsequent authors. Genus Cyanoporina, circumscribed to contain Cyanoporina granulosa in 1951, is now considered to be of uncertain classification in the Pezizomycotina. The second genus of the Pyrenotrichaceae, Neophaeococcomyces, was proposed in 2015. It contains four species of saprobic fungi that live on dead plant bark in terrestrial habitats.

== Description ==
The Pyrenotrichaceae comprises lichens that are either corticolous (growing on bark) or foliicolous (growing on leaves). These lichens have a thallus made up of closely packed yet distinct filaments, each comprising unbranched or pseudo-branched photobiont threads (the photosynthetic part of the lichen) encased in a sheath of fungal hyphae. These hyphae are branched and interconnected, consisting of elongated, often curved cells that are pale brownish in colour and sometimes inflated at the ends. The photobiont in these lichens is cyanobacterial, a type of photosynthesizing bacteria.

In terms of reproduction, the sexual morph of Pyrenotrichaceae is characterised by perithecioid ascomata, which are spore-producing structures that are either sessile (attached directly by the base) or immersed among the thallus filaments. These ascomata are typically spherical to pear-shaped and have a short neck, but lack any sort of hair (i.e., they are glabrous). The opening of the ascomata, or ostiole, is not very distinct and contains long, hyaline (translucent) periphysoids (hair-like structures). The excipulum, or outer layer of the ascomata, is thin and made up of multiple layers of cells that vary in width and wall thickness, ranging from thin-walled and hyaline to thick-walled and heavily pigmented. There is no involucrellum, an additional protective layer found in some other lichens.

Inside the ascomata, the structure known as the hamathecium, which is the tissue containing the spore-bearing cells, lacks paraphyses (sterile filaments). This tissue reacts positively to J and KI staining. The asci (spore-producing cells), are fissitunicate (having a two-layered wall that splits open to release the spores), broadly clavate to sac-like in shape, and do not react to J or KI tests, but their lumen (internal cavity) does turn yellow with iodine and pale yellow with potassium iodide. The ascospores produced by the asci typically number eight per ascus and have a transversal septate to muriform (divided into compartments) structure, with a colour ranging from pale to dark grayish-brown.

The asexual morph of Pyrenotrichaceae, which refers to the part of the life cycle where reproduction does not involve the fusion of gametes, remains undetermined.

== Genera ==
- Pyrenothrix Riddle (1917) – 2 spp.
- Neophaeococcomyces Crous & M.J.Wingf. (2015) – 4 spp.
