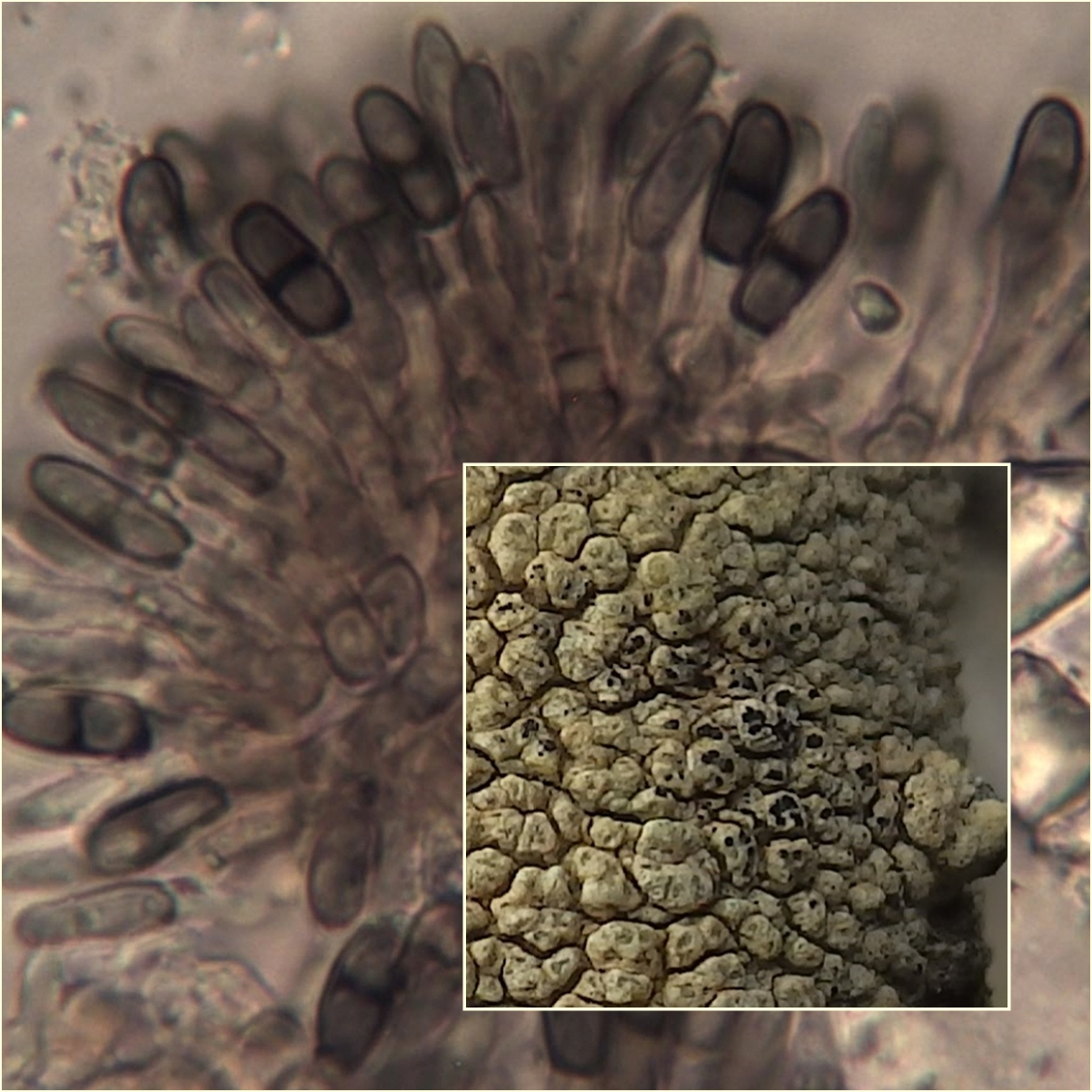
- Microscopic view of the radially arranged conidia in a conidiophore from Minutoexcipula; the inset shows the fungus (visible as black spots) parasitizing its host, a crustose lichen in genus Pertusaria.

Scientific classification
- Kingdom: Fungi
- Division: Ascomycota
- Class: Eurotiomycetes
- Order: Chaetothyriales
- Genus: Minutoexcipula; V.Atienza & D.Hawksw. (1994)

Type species
- Minutoexcipula tuckerae V.Atienza & D.Hawksw. (1994)

= Minutoexcipula =

Genus of lichens

Minutoexcipula is a genus of lichenicolous (lichen-dwelling) fungi of uncertain familial placement in the order Chaetothyriales. It has 14 species. The genus was circumscribed in 1994 by M. Violeta Atienza Tamarit and David Leslie Hawksworth, with Minutoexcipula tuckerae assigned as the type species. The genus is characterized both by its black convex sporodochia-like conidiomata, as well as the well-differentiated exciple on these structures.

== Description ==
The genus Minutoexcipula is characterised by its distinctive spore-producing structures (conidiomata) that can take two forms: they either start as enclosed, flask-like chambers (pycnidioid) that later develop into more open, cushion-like structures (sporodochioid), or they begin as sporodochioid structures from the start. These structures can be either embedded within or, more commonly, sitting on top of the lichen surface. They appear as dark brown to black spots that are typically rounded, though they can occasionally be elongated or slightly irregular in shape.

When viewed under a microscope, the base of these structures consists of a tissue made up of roughly equal-sided or irregularly shaped cells (pseudoparenchymatic cells) that range from nearly colourless to brown. Some species have a distinctive wall-like structure (exciple) around the edge, with the cells at the top often having unevenly thickened, darkly pigmented walls.

The spore-producing stalks (conidiophores) emerge from this basal tissue. These stalks can either be simple, consisting of just the spore-forming cell, or they can be more complex with multiple segments and branches. Their length and complexity typically correspond to how convex the spore-producing structure is. The cells that actually produce the spores (conidiogenous cells) have a distinctive feature where they can grow multiple times through the same point, leaving ring-like scars (annellations).

The spores themselves (conidia) are produced individually at the tips of these stalks. They are smooth, either without walls (0-septate) or with one internal wall (1-septate), and are typically elongated oval in shape with a rounded top and flat base. Their colour ranges from light to medium brown.

Minutoexcipula is similar in appearance to another genus of lichen-dwelling fungi called Lichenodiplis, but can be distinguished by the fact that Lichenodiplis maintains its flask-like spore chambers throughout its development rather than developing into an open structure.

== Species ==
- Minutoexcipula bacidiae Diederich & van den Boom (2024) – host: Bacidia laurocerasi
- Minutoexcipula beaglei Etayo (2008) – host: Lecanora spp.
- Minutoexcipula calatayudii V.Atienza (2001) – host: Hypogymnia tubulosa
- Minutoexcipula kovalenkoi Zhurb. & Diederich (2021) – Lecanora pulicaris
- Minutoexcipula manamiana Diederich (2024) – host: Lecanora spp.
- Minutoexcipula mariana V.Atienza (2001) – Pertusaria chiodectonoides and Pertusaria heterochroa
- Minutoexcipula megalariae Diederich (2024) – host: Megalaria laureri
- Minutoexcipula miniatoexcipula R.C.Harris & Lendemer (2016) – host: Pertusaria epixantha
- Minutoexcipula ohmurae Zhurb. & Diederich (2024) – host: Menegazzia terebrata; Anzia colpota
- Minutoexcipula physciae Zhurb. (2024) – host: Physcia stellaris
- Minutoexcipula tephromelae V.Atienza, Etayo & Pérez-Ort. (2009) – host: Tephromela atra
- Minutoexcipula toensbergii Diederich (2024)
- Minutoexcipula tuckerae V.Atienza & D.Hawksw. (1994) – host: Pertusaria texana
- Minutoexcipula tuerkii Hafellner (1994) – host: Pertusaria glomerata
