= Limacinula tenuis =

Scientific classification
- Kingdom: Fungi
- Division: Ascomycota
- Class: Eurotiomycetes
- Order: Chaetothyriales
- Family: Coccodiniaceae
- Genus: Limacinula
- Species: L. tenuis

Binomial name
- Limacinula tenuis (Earle) Sacc. & Trotter, (1913)

Species of fungus

Limacinula tenuis is a plant pathogen infecting bananas.
