= Barnettia =

Barnettia may refer to:

- Barnettia (cnidarian), a genus of hydrozoans in the family Pandeidae
- Barnettia, a genus of fungi in the family Chaetothyriaceae, synonym of Microcallis
- Barnettia, a genus of plants in the family Bignoniaceae, synonym of Santisukia
