= Pyrenothrix =

Scientific classification
- Domain: Eukaryota
- Kingdom: Fungi
- Division: Ascomycota
- Class: Eurotiomycetes
- Order: Chaetothyriales
- Family: Pyrenotrichaceae
- Genus: Pyrenothrix; Riddle (1917)

Type species
- Pyrenothrix nigra

Species
- P. mexicana P. nigra

Synonyms
- Lichenothrix Henssen (1964)

Genus of lichens

Pyrenothrix is a small genus of lichen-forming fungi in the family Pyrenotrichaceae. It comprises two species of filamentous lichens, which are organisms formed by a symbiotic relationship between fungi and photosynthetic partners. The genus is characterized by its unique structure, featuring densely arranged filaments composed of cyanobacteria (blue-green algae) wrapped in fungal threads. Pyrenothrix species form dark greyish-brown growths on various surfaces, with one species found on tree bark and the other on leaves in tropical forests. The genus was circumscribed in 1917 by American scientist Lincoln Ware Riddle, based on specimens collected in Florida. Pyrenothrix is distinguished from other lichens by its intricate cellular structure and reproductive features, including specialized spore-producing structures.

== Taxonomy ==
The genus was circumscribed in 1917 by the American lichenologist Lincoln Ware Riddle, with P. nigra assigned as the type, and at the time, only species in the genus. A second species was added in 2005. The oldest lichenized fungal type specimen in the fungal, lichen, and myxomycete collections of the University of North Carolina at Chapel Hill herbarium is Pyrenothrix nigra, collected by Roland Thaxter in Florida in 1897. This material was originally found growing on the bark of scrub oaks at West Palm Beach, Florida.

Lichenothrix is a genus that was proposed by Aino Henssen in 1964, but it has since been folded into synonymy with Pyrenothrix.

== Description ==
Species of Pyrenothrix are characterized by their unique morphology and structure, which sets them apart from other lichen genera. The thallus of Pyrenothrix species is composed of densely arranged, appressed filaments that are not conglutinated. These filaments form a continuous layer that can extend up to 100 mm across in some species. The overall appearance of the thallus is dark greyish brown, though individual filaments appear yellowish to light olive brown under microscopic examination. A distinctive feature of Pyrenothrix is the structure of its photobiont association. The filaments are formed by photobiont threads of Scytonema (a genus of cyanobacteria) wrapped in a sheath of fungal hyphae. This close association creates the characteristic appearance of the lichen thallus. The photobiont cells, when extruded from their gelatinous sheath, appear bluish-green and are typically applanate to rectangular in shape.

The fungal hyphae forming the sheath around the photobiont filaments have a unique structure. They are greatly branched and anastomosing, creating a network that at first glance may appear to form a closed, almost paraplectenchymatous layer. However, closer examination reveals that they consist of distinct, septate hyphae. The individual cells of these hyphae are often curved and terminally inflated, which may represent haustoria. The ascomata of Pyrenothrix are perithecioid, appearing as sessile structures on the thallus. They are spherical to pear-shaped with a short neck, and their color matches the dark greyish brown of the thallus. The size of the perithecia varies between species, ranging from 0.13 to 0.17 mm in diameter in P. mexicana to 0.2–0.3 mm in P. nigra.

The excipulum (peridium) of the perithecia is relatively thin, measuring 10–15 μm in P. mexicana and 15–25 μm in P. nigra. It has a distinctive structure consisting of several layers. The innermost 2–3 layers are composed of very narrow, thin-walled, and periclinally elongate, almost hyaline cells. The median 1–2 layers consist of broader, rather large, thick-walled, and strongly pigmented cells. The outermost 2–3 layers are made up of isodiametric to irregular, thin-walled, and paler cells. This layered structure contributes to the unique characteristics of the Pyrenothrix perithecia.

The asci (spore-bearing cells) in Pyrenothrix are fissitunicate, broadly clavate to saccate in shape. They produce eight ascospores per ascus. The ascospores are fusiform and septate, with the septation pattern differing between species. In P. mexicana, the ascospores are transversally 3-septate, while in P. nigra, they are (sub)muriform with (3–)5 transversal and 0–1 longitudinal septa per segment. This unique combination of morphological and anatomical features distinguishes Pyrenothrix from other lichen genera and contributes to its classification within the Pyrenotrichaceae.

== Photobiont associations ==
The photobiont of Pyrenothrix nigra has a filamentous cyanobacterial structure with double-false branching, a characteristic traditionally associated with the genus Scytonema. However, research by Robert Lücking and colleagues has suggested that the photobiont might actually belong to the genus Rhizonema. This proposition is considered plausible due to ongoing debates about the reliability of branching patterns as a distinguishing feature between Scytonema and Rhizonema.

Rhizonema, a recently resurrected cyanobacterial genus, was established to classify filamentous, heterocyte-producing photobionts previously thought to be Scytonema, but genetically distinct based on 16S rRNA sequences. The branching patterns in Rhizonema have been observed to include both apparent true branching and false branching, complicating the morphological distinction between these genera.

The exact nature of the photobiont in Pyrenothrix remains uncertain, highlighting the need for more extensive genetic sequencing to clarify the taxonomic boundaries and symbiotic relationships within lichen associations. This uncertainty extends to other lichen symbioses potentially involving Scytonema in its current, more restricted sense.

The cyanobacterial photobionts in Pyrenothrix, whether Scytonema or Rhizonema, are known to produce heterocytes, specialized cells capable of nitrogen fixation. This ability to fix atmospheric nitrogen into biologically usable forms is ecologically significant, potentially contributing to nutrient cycling in the environments where these lichens occur. The filamentous nature of these cyanobionts, characterized by chains of cells (trichomes), allows for the formation of the lichen's distinctive structure.

In Pyrenothrix mexicana, the photobiont has been identified as Scytonema. The thallus is composed of densely arranged, appressed filaments that are not conglutinated. These filaments are formed by unbranched or falsely branched photobiont threads enveloped in a sheath of fungal hyphae. This unique structure creates the characteristic appearance of the lichen thallus. Microscopic examination of P. mexicana reveals that individual filaments appear yellowish to light olive brown. The extruded photobiont threads are bluish, with very applanate cells measuring 2–5 by 10–15 μm.

== Species ==
- Pyrenothrix mexicana Herrera-Camp., Huhndorf & Lücking (2005)
- Pyrenothrix nigra Riddle (1917)
