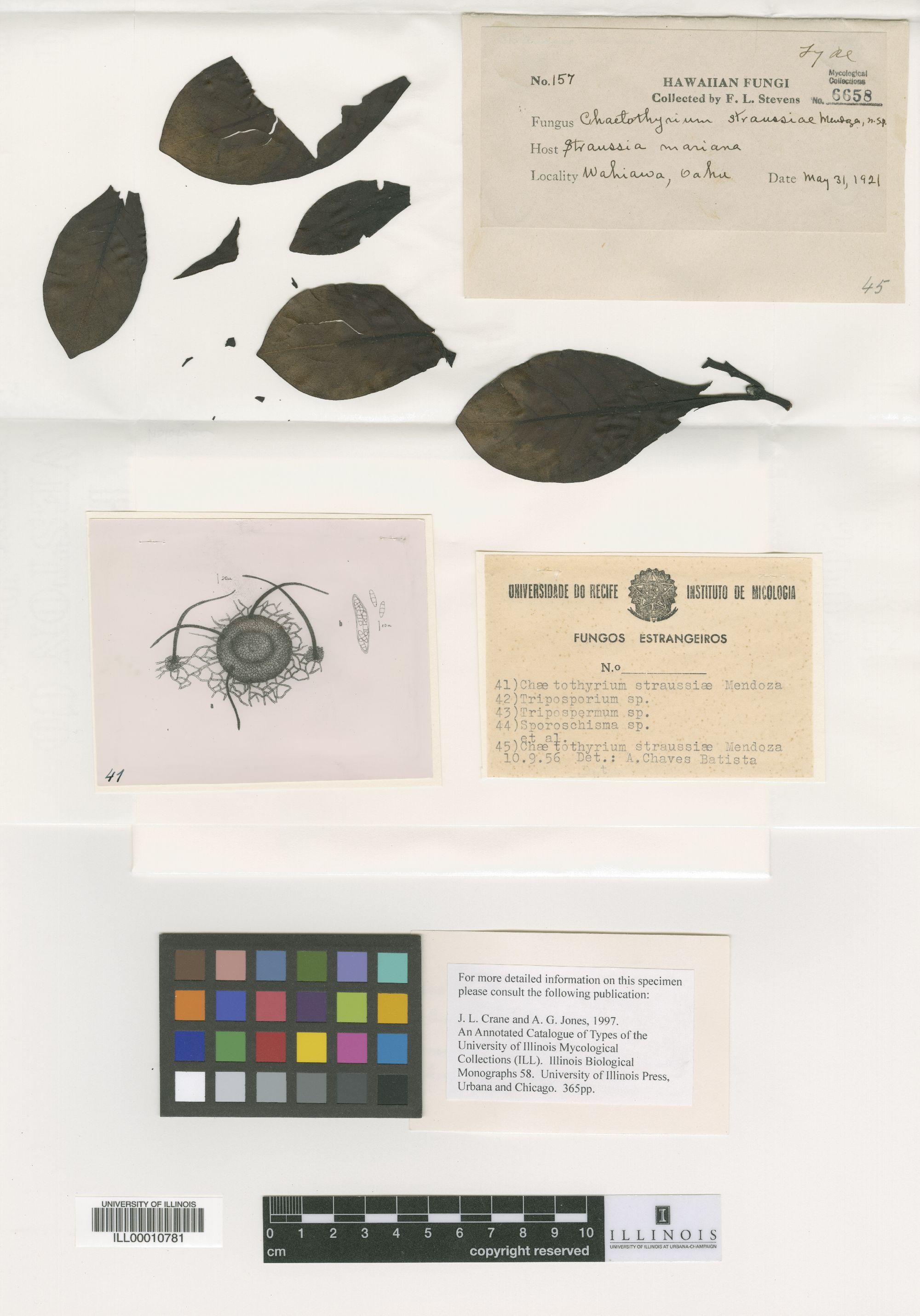
- Chaetothyrium straussiae

Scientific classification
- Kingdom: Fungi
- Division: Ascomycota
- Class: Eurotiomycetes
- Order: Chaetothyriales
- Family: Chaetothyriaceae
- Genus: Chaetothyrium; Speg.

Type species
- Chaetothyrium guaraniticum Speg.

= Chaetothyrium =

Genus of fungi

Chaetothyrium is a genus of fungi in the family Chaetothyriaceae.

== Species ==
As accepted by Species Fungorum;

- Chaetothyrium acalyphae Hansf. (1946)
- Chaetothyrium agathidis Hongsanan & K.D. Hyde (2015)
- Chaetothyrium annonicola Hansf. (1946)
- Chaetothyrium bauhiniae Bat. & I.H. Lima (1955)
- Chaetothyrium berenice (Berk. & M.A. Curtis) M.E. Barr (1993)
- Chaetothyrium bischofiicola Chomnunti, T.W. Ko Ko, Chukeat., K.D. Hyde, L. Cai, E.B.G. Jones, Kodsueb, Bahkali & Hang Chen (2012)
- Chaetothyrium boedijnii Hansf. (1957)
- Chaetothyrium butleri (Syd. & P. Syd.) Mundk. (1938)
- Chaetothyrium capense (Doidge) Hansf. (1950)
- Chaetothyrium caricae Syd. (1926)
- Chaetothyrium citricola Sawada & W. Yamam. (1959)
- Chaetothyrium concinnum Syd. (1926)
- Chaetothyrium diversum Mig. Rodr. (1985)
- Chaetothyrium dominicanum Cif. (1957)
- Chaetothyrium echinulatum W. Yamam. (1956)
- Chaetothyrium fuscum L.R. Fraser (1935)
- Chaetothyrium guaraniticum Speg. (1888)
- Chaetothyrium hawaiiense J.M. Mend. (1925)
- Chaetothyrium heteromeles (Cooke & Harkn.) Theiss. (1918)
- Chaetothyrium hirsutum (Speg.) Theiss. (1919)
- Chaetothyrium indistinctum A. Pande (1979)
- Chaetothyrium jasminicola V.P. Sahni (1966)
- Chaetothyrium javanicum (Zimm.) Boedijn (1931)
- Chaetothyrium mangiferae J.M. Mend. (1925)
- Chaetothyrium muriforme J.M. Mend. (1932)
- Chaetothyrium mysorense Hansf. & Thirum. (1948)
- Chaetothyrium pelliculosum Petr. (1929)
- Chaetothyrium permixtum Syd. (1926)
- Chaetothyrium petchii Hansf. (1947)
- Chaetothyrium pongamiae H.A. Harris (1933)
- Chaetothyrium punctiforme Rick (1906)
- Chaetothyrium rickianum Theiss. (1913)
- Chaetothyrium roseum Hansf. (1944)
- Chaetothyrium sawadae W. Yamam. (1956)
- Chaetothyrium setosum (Zimm.) Hansf. (1954)
- Chaetothyrium sinense Teng (1936)
- Chaetothyrium spinigerum (Höhn.) W. Yamam. (1941)
- Chaetothyrium straussiae J.M. Mend. (1925)
- Chaetothyrium strigosum L.R. Fraser (1935)
- Chaetothyrium stuhlmannianum (Henn.) Theiss. (1919)
- Chaetothyrium syzygii Hansf. (1946)
- Chaetothyrium tapirirae Bat. (1953)
- Chaetothyrium ugandense Hansf. (1946)
- Chaetothyrium womersleyi Hansf. (1956)

Former species;

- C. anacardii (Hansf.) Hansf. (1946) = Ceramothyrium anacardii, Chaetothyriaceae
- C. babingtonii (Berk.) Keissl. (1937) = Dennisiella babingtonii, Coccodiniaceae
- C. biseptatum (Sacc.) Hansf. (1946) = Ceramothyrium biseptatum, Chaetothyriaceae
- C. ceibae Petr. & Cif. (1957) = Phaeosaccardinula ceibae, Chaetothyriaceae
- C. cinereum L.R. Fraser (1935) = Ceramothyrium cinereum, Chaetothyriaceae
- C. citri (Briosi & Pass.) E.E. Fisher (1940) = Capnodium citri, Capnodiaceae
- C. clavatisporum (Syd. & P. Syd.) Hansf. (1946) = Aithaloderma clavatisporum, Capnodiaceae
- C. depressum L.R. Fraser (1935) = Ceramothyrium depressum, Chaetothyriaceae
- C. dictyosporum Petr. (1947) = Phaeosaccardinula dictyospora, Chaetothyriaceae
- C. dominicanum var. longispora A.B. Panwar & M.S. Patil (1990) = Chaetothyrium dominicanum
- C. ekmanii Petr. & Cif. (1932) = Dennisiella ekmanii, Coccodiniaceae
- C. fusisporum L.R. Fraser (1935) = Dennisiella fusispora, Coccodiniaceae
- C. globosum L.R. Fraser (1935) = Ceramothyrium globosum, Chaetothyriaceae
- C. griseolum L.R. Fraser (1935) = Ceramothyrium griseolum, Chaetothyriaceae
- C. musarum Speg. (1898) = Chaetothyrina musarum, Micropeltidaceae
- C. peltatum L.R. Fraser (1935) = Ceramothyrium peltatum, Chaetothyriaceae
- C. pongamiae var. fici A.B. Panwar & M.S. Patil (1990) = Chaetothyrium pongamiae
- C. pulchellum (Starbäck) Theiss. (1913) = Malmeomyces pulchellus, Niessliaceae
- C. variabile Toro (1927) = Phaeochaetia variabilis, Capnodiaceae
- C. vermisporum Hansf. (1946) = Longihyalospora vermisporum, Chaetothyriaceae
- C. vermisporum var. glabrum Hansf. (1957) = Longihyalospora vermisporum, Chaetothyriaceae
