= Ainsworthia =

Scientific classification
- Domain: Eukaryota
- Kingdom: Fungi
- Division: Ascomycota
- Class: Eurotiomycetes
- Order: Chaetothyriales
- Family: Chaetothyriaceae
- Genus: Ainsworthia; Bat. & Cif. 1962

Genus of fungi

Ainsworthia is a genus of fungi in the family Chaetothyriaceae.

The genus was circumscribed by Augusto Chaves Batista and Raffaele Ciferri in Sydowia Beih. vol.3 on page 4 in 1962.

The genus name of Ainsworthia is in honour of Geoffrey Clough Ainsworth (1905–1998), who was a British mycologist and scientific historian.

== Species ==
As accepted by Species Fungorum;

- Ainsworthia lecythidacearum Bat., J.L. Bezerra & Peres (1964)
- Ainsworthia oblongotheca A.A. Silva (1964)
- Ainsworthia psidii Bat., J.L. Bezerra & Poroca (1966)
- Ainsworthia roraimensis Bat. & Cavalc. (1966)
- Ainsworthia smilacina Bat. & A.F. Vital (1962)
- Ainsworthia zanthoxyli Bat. & C.A.A. Costa (1962)

Former species;

- A. morindae (J.M. Mend.) Bat. (1962) = Phaeosaccardinula morindae, Chaetothyriaceae
- A. negeriana (Sacc., Syd. & P. Syd.) Bat. & Cif. (1962) = Teichosporella negeriana, Dothideomycetes family
- A. seaveriana (Toro) Bat. & Cif. (1962) = Phaeosaccardinula seaveriana, Chaetothyriaceae
