= Microtheliopsidaceae =

Scientific classification
- Kingdom: Fungi
- Division: Ascomycota
- Class: Eurotiomycetes
- Order: Chaetothyriales
- Family: Microtheliopsidaceae; O.E. Erikss., 1981

Type genus
- Microtheliopsis Müll. Arg., 1890

Genera
- See text

Family of fungi

Microtheliopsidaceae is a family of fungi in the order Chaetothyriales. It contains four genera: Byrsomyces, Chaetomonodorus, Micropyrenula, and Microtheliopsis.
