= Knufia peltigerae =

Scientific classification
- Kingdom: Fungi
- Division: Ascomycota
- Class: Eurotiomycetes
- Order: Chaetothyriales
- Family: Trichomeriaceae
- Genus: Knufia
- Species: K. peltigerae

Binomial name
- Knufia peltigerae (Fuckel) Réblová & Unter., 2013

Species of fungus

Knufia peltigerae is a species of fungus with unknown classification.

Synonym:

- Trichosphaeria peltigerae (= basionym) Fuckel, 1873
