= Microtheliopsis =

Scientific classification
- Domain: Eukaryota
- Kingdom: Fungi
- Division: Ascomycota
- Class: Eurotiomycetes
- Order: Chaetothyriales
- Family: Microtheliopsidaceae
- Genus: Microtheliopsis; Müll.Arg. (1890)

Type species
- Microtheliopsis uleana Müll.Arg. (1890)

Species
- M. ramazaniana M. uleana M. uniseptata M. winkleri

Synonyms
- Micropyrenula Vain. (1921); Microtheliopsidomyces Cif. & Tomas. (1953); Chaetomonodorus Bat. & H.Maia (1961); Byrsomyces Cavalc. (1972)

Genus of lichens

Microtheliopsis is a genus of lichen-forming fungi in the family Microtheliopsidaceae. It comprises four species of foliicolous (leaf-dwelling) crustose lichens.

== Taxonomy ==
The genus was circumscribed by the Swiss lichenologist Johannes Müller Argoviensis in 1890, with M. uleana assigned as the type, and at the time, only species. The genus remained relatively obscure until a second species, from Costa Rica, was added in 1994.

== Description ==
Microtheliopsis is a genus of lichen-forming fungi that primarily grows on the leaves of understory plants and shrubs (epiphyllous and foliicolous). The thallus, or main body of the lichen, forms a thin, crust-like (crustose) layer on the leaf surface. It lacks a protective outer layer (ecorticate) and has a rounded to irregular shape along its edges. The surface of the thallus can be smooth or sparsely covered with tiny hair-like structures (setose).

The ascomata (sexual reproductive structures) are flask-shaped (perithecial) and small, appearing as solitary, scattered bumps that are easily visible on the leaf surface. These perithecia are dark brown to black, rounded or slightly elongated, and partially embedded in the algal layer of the thallus. They are surrounded by irregular, dark brown fungal filaments (hyphae) and have a small opening at the top (ostiole) for spore release. The wall of the perithecium (peridium) is thin and made of a single layer of large, angular cells.

Inside the perithecia, the spore-producing layer contains no sterile filaments (pseudoparaphyses) but instead has a gelatinous matrix. The asci (spore-bearing structures) are club-shaped (clavate) and have a double-layered wall (bitunicate), containing eight spores each. The spores themselves are spindle-shaped (fusiform), divided into 1–3 sections (septate) or sometimes have a more complex internal structure (submuriform). They have smooth walls and rounded ends. The asexual reproductive form of Microtheliopsis is not yet known.

== Species ==
- Microtheliopsis ramazaniana Van den Broeck, Lücking & Ertz 2014) – Congo
- Microtheliopsis uleana Müll.Arg. (1890) – South America
- Microtheliopsis uniseptata Herrera-Camp. & Lücking (2008) – Mexico
- Microtheliopsis winkleri Lücking (1994) – Costa Rica
