= Geoffrey Clough Ainsworth =

Mycologist, historian (1905-1998)

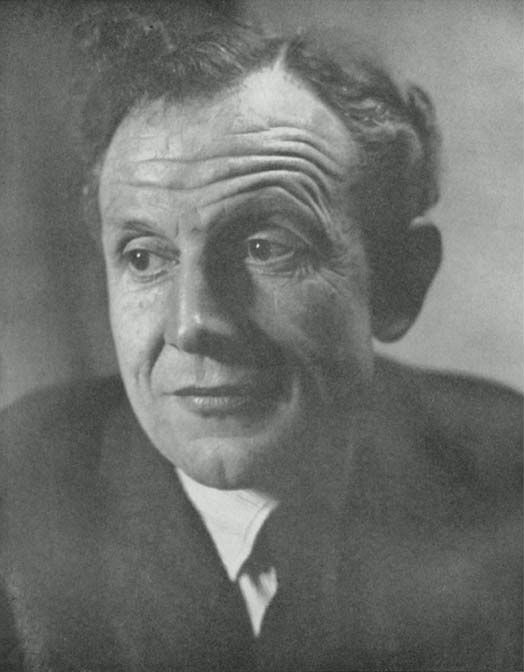
Geoffrey Clough Ainsworth, 1950

Geoffrey Clough Ainsworth (9 October 1905 in Birmingham – 25 October 1998 in Derby) was a British mycologist and scientific historian. He was the older brother of Ruth Ainsworth.

== Education and work ==
Ainsworth received his doctorate in Biology from the University of London in 1934. From the 1930s to 1960s, he studied and wrote on fungi including their medical uses. Later, he wrote on the history of the field with An Introduction to the History of Mycology (1976), An Introduction to the History of Plant Pathology (1981), and An Introduction to the History of Medical and Veterinary Mycology in 1986.

In 1962 botanists Augusto Chaves Batista and Raffaele Ciferri circumscribed a genus of fungi (family Chaetothyriaceae) named Ainsworthia and named in Geoffrey Ainsworth's honour.

== Awards ==
- 1980 Linnean Medal, shared with Roy Crowson

== Bibliography ==
- Ainsworth & Bisby's Dictionary of the Fungi (1st Edition 1943, 2nd 1945, 3rd 1950, 4th 1954, 5th 1961, 6th 1971, 7th 1983, 8th 1995, 9th 2001, 10th Edition 2008)
- The British Smut Fungi (Ustilaginales), (written with Kathleen Sampson, 1950),
- Medical mycology; an introduction to its problems (1952),
- The Fungi: An Advanced Treatise. Vols. 1–5. (1965),
- Fungal Diseases of Animals (Review series of the Commonwealth Bureau of Animal Health, written with P. K. C. Austwick, 1973),
- Introduction to the History of Mycology (1976),
- Nomenclature of fungi pathogenic to man and animals (1977),
- Introduction to the History of Plant Pathology (1981),
- Introduction to the History of Medical and Veterinary Mycology (1986).

== See also ==
- List of mycologists
