= Treubiomyces =

Scientific classification
- Kingdom: Fungi
- Division: Ascomycota
- Class: Eurotiomycetes
- Order: Chaetothyriales
- Family: Chaetothyriaceae
- Genus: Treubiomyces; Höhn

Type species
- Treubiomyces pulcherrimus Höhn.

Genus of fungi

Treubiomyces is a genus of fungi in the family Chaetothyriaceae.

The genus was circumscribed by Franz Xaver Rudolf von Höhnel in Sitzungsber. Kaiserl. Akad. Wiss., Math.-Naturwiss. Cl., Abt. 1, 118: 1180 in 1909.

The genus name, Treubiomyces, is in honour of Melchior Treub (1851–1910), a Dutch botanist. He worked at the Bogor Botanical Gardens in Buitenzorg on the island of Java, south of Batavia, Dutch East Indies, gaining renown for his work on tropical flora.

== Species ==
As accepted by Species Fungorum;

- Treubiomyces celastri Doidge (1927)
- Treubiomyces citri Rodr. Mir. (1975)
- Treubiomyces funtumiae (Hansf.) D.R. Reynolds (1983)
- Treubiomyces japonicus Hara (1931)
- Treubiomyces pacificus D.R. Reynolds (1983)
- Treubiomyces pulcherrimus Höhn. (1909)
- Treubiomyces roseosporus (Höhn.) D.R. Reynolds (1983)
