= Yatesula =

Scientific classification
- Kingdom: Fungi
- Division: Ascomycota
- Class: Eurotiomycetes
- Order: Chaetothyriales
- Family: Chaetothyriaceae
- Genus: Yatesula; Syd. & P. Syd.

Type species
- Yatesula calami Syd. & P. Syd.

Genus of fungi

Yatesula is a genus of fungi in the family Chaetothyriaceae.
