= Limacinula =

Scientific classification
- Kingdom: Fungi
- Division: Ascomycota
- Class: Eurotiomycetes
- Order: Chaetothyriales
- Family: Coccodiniaceae
- Genus: Limacinula; Höhn.

Species
- See main text.

Genus of fungi

Limacinula is a genus of fungi within the Coccodiniaceae family. The genus was first named by Franz Xaver Rudolf von Höhnel in 1907.

== Species ==
- Limacinula anomala
- Limacinula butleri
- Limacinula caucasica
- Limacinula citricola
- Limacinula costaricensis
- Limacinula cupularis
- Limacinula depressa
- Limacinula ficicola
- Limacinula indica
- Limacinula javanica
- Limacinula macrospora
- Limacinula malloti
- Limacinula martinezii
- Limacinula melioloides
- Limacinula meridionalis
- Limacinula musicola
- Limacinula oleae
- Limacinula roseospora
- Limacinula salicis
- Limacinula samoënsis
- Limacinula tahitensis
- Limacinula tenuis
- Limacinula theae
- Limacinula zantedeschiae
