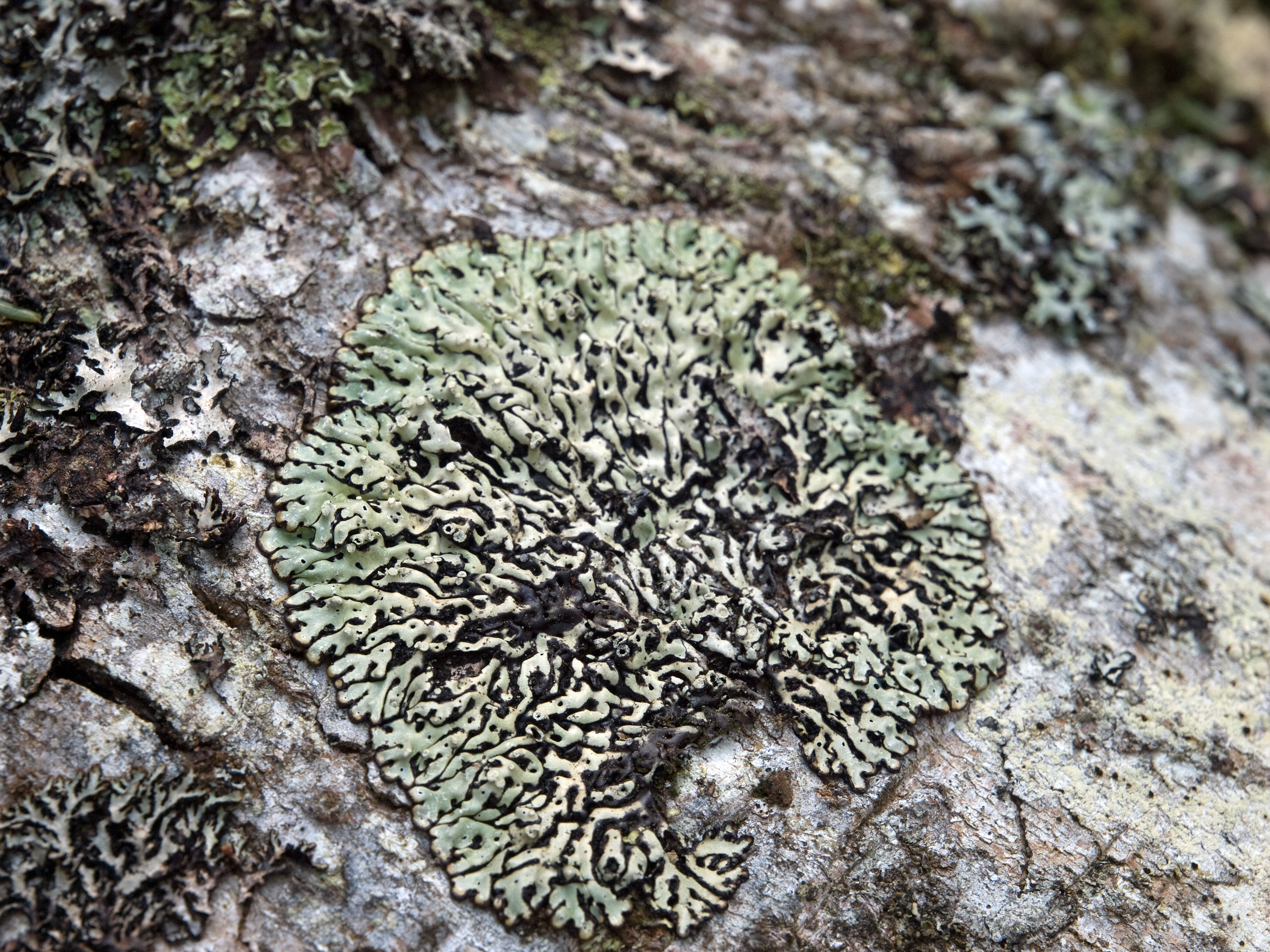
- Menegazzia terebrata, photographed in Bavaria

Conservation status
- Secure (NatureServe)

Scientific classification
- Kingdom: Fungi
- Division: Ascomycota
- Class: Lecanoromycetes
- Order: Lecanorales
- Family: Parmeliaceae
- Genus: Menegazzia
- Species: M. terebrata

Binomial name
- Menegazzia terebrata (Hoffm.) A.Massal. (1854)

Synonyms
- Species synonymy: "Hypogymnia pertusa" (Schaer.) (1896); "Imbricaria diatrypa" (Ach.) (1805); "Imbricaria pertusa" (Schaer.) (1884); "Imbricaria physodes" var. terebrata (Hoffm.) (1863); "Imbricaria terebrata" (Hoffm.) 1846); "Lichen diatrypus" (Ach.) (1799); "Lobaria physodes" var. diatrypa (Ach.) (1839); "Lobaria terebrata" (Hoffm.) (1796); "Menegazzia diatrypa" (Ach.) (1860); "Menegazzia pertusa" (Schaer.) (1879); "Parmelia ceratophylla var. pertusa" (Schaer.) (1845); "Parmelia diatrypa" (Ach.) (1803); "Parmelia diatrypea" (Ach.) (1803); "Parmelia pertusa" (Schaer.) (1840); "Parmelia physodes f. diatrypa" (Ach.) (1853); "Parmelia physodes var. diatrypa" (Ach.) (1830); "Parmelia physodes var. terebrata" (Hoffm.) (1843); "Parmelia terebrata" (Hoffm.) (1817); "Physcia diatrypa" (Ach.) (1821); "Physcia terebrata" (Hoffm.) (1812)

= Menegazzia terebrata =

Species of lichen-forming fungus

Menegazzia terebrata is a species of foliose lichen found scattered across many continents, including North America, South America, Europe, Africa, and Asia.

== Taxonomy ==
This species was first described as Lobaria terebrata by Georg Franz Hoffmann in 1796. In 1854, Italian lichenologist Abramo Bartolommeo Massalongo renamed it Menegazzia terebrata.

== Description ==
Menegazzia terebrata has a glossy blue-grey thallus and a black, wrinkled undersurface. This species does not have any rhizines on the undersurface. The medulla is white. Asci contain eight single-celled ascospores, like most species of Ascomycota. The spores are amyloid positive. The outside edges are different shades of brown. This species is distinguished by small holes in the upper thallus. Apothecia are rarely seen on this species so they mostly reproduce asexually. The lobes of this lichen are rounded and almost tube-like, with soredia on the lobe tips. The holes in its upper surface give the lichen many of its common names, including treeflute lichen, honeycomb lichen, and keyhole lichen. A potassium hydroxide test will produce K+ yellow results on the surface and medulla of this lichen.

== Habitat and distribution ==
Menegazzia terebrata grows on acidic substrates, including trees and rock. It prefers acidic species of tree, including alder, beech, and northern white cedar. It also prefers to grow on more acidic siliceous and siliciferous rock. It is most common in northern wet-mesic forests. It can be an indicator of an old growth forest. This species sometimes grows with moss, and often the moss grows between the lobes of lichen. It is often found growing on coastlines near the ocean. Menegazzia terebrata was found to be an indicator species of clean air in Western Oregon and Washington.

In Nepal, Menegazzia terebrata has been reported from 1,300 to 4,000 m elevation in a compilation of published records.

== Ecology ==
The algae in this lichen are chlorococcoid.

== Chemistry ==
Menegazzia terebrata produces a number of secondary metabolites. The cortex contains atranorin. The medullar layer contains menegazziaic acid, stictic acid and constictic acid. Menegazzia terebrata and another species of lichen in the Menegazzia family were the first two species where menegazziaic acid were found, so it was named after them. Meneggazziaic acid is a 3-hydroxylated 3-deformylstitic acid.

== See also ==
- List of Menegazzia species
