= Coccodinium =

Scientific classification
- Kingdom: Fungi
- Division: Ascomycota
- Class: Eurotiomycetes
- Order: Chaetothyriales
- Family: Coccodiniaceae
- Genus: Coccodinium; A. Massal.

Type species
- Coccodinium bartschii A. Massal.

Species
- C. bartschii C. citricola C. corticola C. aricis C. magnoliae

Genus of fungi

Coccodinium is a genus of five species of fungi within the Coccodiniaceae family.
