= Euceramia =

Scientific classification
- Kingdom: Fungi
- Division: Ascomycota
- Class: Eurotiomycetes
- Order: Chaetothyriales
- Family: Chaetothyriaceae
- Genus: Euceramia; Bat. & Cif.

Type species
- Euceramia palmicola Bat. & Cif.

Genus of fungi

Euceramia is a genus of fungi in the family Chaetothyriaceae.
