= Knufia =

Scientific classification
- Kingdom: Fungi
- Division: Ascomycota
- Class: Eurotiomycetes
- Order: Chaetothyriales
- Family: Trichomeriaceae
- Genus: Knufia; L.J.Hutchison & Unter. (1996)

Genus of fungi

Knufia is a genus of fungi in the family Trichomeriaceae.

The genus was circumscribed by Leonard Hutchison and Wendy Untereiner in 1996, with Knufia cryptophialidica assigned as the type species.

== Species ==
As of August 2022, Species Fungorum (in the Catalogue of Life) accepts 13 species of Knufia, although this number does not include some species described in 2020 and 2021.

- Knufia aspidioti F.He & Xing Z.Liu (2013)
- Knufia calcicola L.Su, W.Sun & M.C.Xiang (2020)
- Knufia chersonesos (Bogom. & Minter) Tsuneda, Hambl. & Currah (2011)
- Knufia cryptophialidica L.J.Hutchison & Unter. (1996)
- Knufia endospora Tsuneda & Currah (2006)
- Knufia epidermidis (D.M.Li, de Hoog, Saunte & X.R.Chen) Tsuneda, Hambl. & Currah (2011)
- Knufia karalitana Isola & Onofri (2019)
- Knufia marmoricola Onofri & Zucconi (2019)
- Knufia mediterranea Selbmann & Zucconi (2019)
- Knufia peltigerae (Fuckel) Réblová & Unter. (2013)
- Knufia perfecta Mehrabi, Asgari & Hemmati (2017)
- Knufia perforans (Sterfl.) Tsuneda, Hambl. & Currah (2011)
- Knufia petricola (Wollenz. & de Hoog) Gorbushina & Gueidan (2013)
- Knufia separata L.Su, W.Sun & M.C.Xiang (2020)
- Knufia tsunedae Madrid, Guarro & Crous (2013)
- Knufia walvisbayicola Crous (2021)
