= Oomyces =

Scientific classification
- Kingdom: Fungi
- Division: Ascomycota
- Class: Dothideomycetes
- Order: Acrospermales
- Family: Acrospermaceae
- Genus: Oomyces; Berk. & Broome (1851)

Type species
- Oomyces carneoalbus (Lib.) Berk. & Broome (1851)

Species
- O. albosuccineus O. caespitosus O. carneoalbus O. ichnaspidis O. incanus O. javanicus O. monocarpus

Genus of fungi

Oomyces is a genus of fungi in the family Acrospermaceae.
