= Lincoln Ware Riddle =

American lichenologist (1880–1921)

- Born: 17 October 1880; Jamaica Plain, Massachusetts
- Died: 16 January 1921 (aged 40); Cambridge, Massachusetts
- Scientific career
- Fields: Lichenology
- Author abbrev. (botany): Riddle

Lincoln Ware Riddle (October 17, 1880 – January 16, 1921) was an American botanist who specialized in the study of lichens. Born and educated in Massachusetts, Riddle made significant contributions to lichenology, leveraging extensive scientific collections at Wellesley College and Harvard University. Throughout his career, he held esteemed positions at both institutions and was actively involved in botanical societies and editorial boards. His untimely death at the age of 40 left a notable void in the botanical community, but his impact remains, marked by various publications and honors.

== Early life and education ==
Born in Jamaica Plain, Massachusetts, Riddle was educated at the Roxbury Latin School and a private school in Boston. His fascination with botany began at age 12 when he resolved to pursue it professionally, a decision he never wavered from. With access to the collections of cryptogamic botanist Clara Eaton Cummings at Wellesley and the substantial resources at Harvard University, Riddle aspired to significantly advance the study of lichens. He graduated from Harvard in 1902 and subsequently earned his A.M. in 1904 and Ph.D. in 1906.

== Career ==
Starting his career at Wellesley College as an instructor in botany, Riddle later became a full professor in 1917. During this tenure, he managed the lichen herbarium previously overseen by Clara Eaton Cummings. His proximity and access to both this collection and the remarkable one at Harvard bolstered his reputation among American and European lichenologists.

In 1913, Riddle took a year's leave from Wellesley to study lichen collections and collaborate with botanists in various European cities including London, Paris, Geneva, Uppsala and Helsingfors. He returned to the U.S. and, in 1919, was appointed assistant professor of Cryptogamic Botany and Associate Curator of the Cryptogamic Herbarium at Harvard.

Riddle was actively involved in the New England Botanical Club, serving as its Cryptogamic Curator from 1910 to 1917, and its president from 1917 to 1920. Before falling ill, he was designated as an associate editor of the scientific journal Rhodora, succeeding the late Frank Shipley Collins. He also held the role of associate editor for The Bryologist from 1911. Furthermore, he was a Fellow of the American Academy of Arts and Sciences and a member of the Botanical Society of America.

His publications predominantly centered on systematic lichenology. In his final published work on Acrospermum, Riddle began exploring other areas of mycology.

== Death ==
He died at his Cambridge residence on January 16, 1921, after a prolonged illness, concluding just one year of teaching at Harvard. Riddle's premature demise was deeply felt by the scientific community due to his valuable contributions, expertise, and dedication to botanical research. In an obituary jointly authored by Harvard colleagues Winthrop John Van Leuven Osterhout, Roland Thaxter, and Merritt Lyndon Fernald, they wrote "In the circle which mourns him his careful scholarship was widely esteemed by his professional associates; he was honored by all for his inspiring ideals, and, beyond the lot of most men, he was sincerely beloved".

== Eponyms ==
Riddle had two species named in his honour: Verrucaria riddleana R.C.Harris (1995), and Lichenothrix riddlei Henssen (1964).

== Selected publications ==
Riddle had 24 publications in his short career; a complete list in given in his obituary written by Bruce Fink. A few representative publications–including his first and final–are listed here.

- Riddle, Lincoln Ware (1906). "On the cytology of the Entomophthoraceae". Proceedings of the American Academy of Arts and Sciences. 42: 177–195.
- ————————— (1910). "The North American species of Stereocaulon". Botanical Gazette. 50: 285–304.
- ————————— (1912). "An enumeration of the lichens collected by Clara Eaton Cummings in Jamaica". Mycologia. 4 (3): 125–140.
- ————————— (1916). "The lichens of Bermuda". Bulletin of the Torrey Botanical Club. 43: 145–160.
- ————————— (1917). "Pyrenothrix nigra gen. et sp. nov". Botanical Gazette. 64: 513–515.
- ————————— (1920). "Observations on the genus Acrospermum". Mycologia. 12 (4): 175–181.

== See also ==
- Category:Taxa named by Lincoln Ware Riddle
