= Phaeosaccardinula =

Scientific classification
- Kingdom: Fungi
- Division: Ascomycota
- Class: Eurotiomycetes
- Order: Chaetothyriales
- Family: Chaetothyriaceae
- Genus: Phaeosaccardinula; P. Henn.

Type species
- Phaeosaccardinula diospyricola Henn.

Genus of fungi

Phaeosaccardinula is a genus of fungi in the family Chaetothyriaceae.
