= Cyanoporina =

Scientific classification
- Kingdom: Fungi
- Division: Ascomycota
- Class: incertae sedis
- Order: incertae sedis
- Family: incertae sedis
- Genus: Cyanoporina; Groenh. (1951)
- Species: C. granulosa

Binomial name
- Cyanoporina granulosa Groenh. (1951)

Single-species lichen genus

Cyanoporina is a fungal genus in the division Ascomycota. The relationship of this taxon to other taxa within the division is unknown (incertae sedis), and it has not yet been placed with certainty into any class, order, or family. The genus is monospecific, containing the single species Cyanoporina granulosa, a crustose lichen found in West Java, Indonesia.

== Taxonomy ==
Cyanoporina was circumscribed as a new genus by the Dutch mycologist Pieter Groenhart in 1951. The genus name combines cyano (referring to the blue-green algal photobiont) with -porina (alluding to its similarity to the genus Porina). The specific epithet granulosa alludes to the granular appearance of the thallus.

The type species, Cyanoporina granulosa, was described in the same publication. The genus was provisionally assigned to the family Pyrenotrichaceae based on its Scytonema-like photobiont, although it differs from other members of this family in several respects.

== Description ==
The thallus of Cyanoporina is crustose, homoiomerous (with the photobiont distributed throughout), and granular in appearance. It forms small to large patches growing over mosses, lichens, and detritus on tree bark. The thallus lacks soredia and isidia and is not surrounded by a dark hypothalline line.

The photobiont belongs to the cyanobacterial family Stygonemataceae. The cells are yellowish-green, rounded to angular or crescent-shaped, measuring 8–12 μm wide and 10–15 μm long. One or more cells are enclosed within a gelatinous, colourless to pale citrine sheath 4–6 μm thick.

The fruiting bodies (ascomata) are perithecia, which are almost invisible to the naked eye and often covered by thallus granules. The perithecia are roughly spherical, 110–130 μm in diameter, pale fulvescent to yellowish, with a pseudoparenchymatous wall 10–12 μm thick composed of densely interwoven hyphae. No distinct pore was observed.

The asci are cylindrical, thin-walled, 8-spored, measuring 7–9 μm wide and 90–120 μm long, with a thin, rounded top. Spores are uniseriate, colourless, 3-septate, fusiform, tapering towards the tips, 3–4 μm wide and 16–20 μm long, with cubic cells. Paraphyses are diffluent (dissolving into a liquid) and only fragments were observed. Pycnidia were not found in the type specimen.

== Habitat and distribution ==
Cyanoporina granulosa was originally collected from the bark of Machilus declinata at an altitude of 1,310 m (4,300 ft) on Mount Gegerbentang in West Java, Indonesia. It was found growing over mosses, lichens, and detritus.
