= Arthur Bliss Seymour =

American botanist and mycologist (1859-1933)

Arthur Bliss Seymour (January 3, 1859 – March 29, 1933) was an American botanist and mycologist who specialized in parasitic fungi. He worked at the Harvard University Herbarium.

== Early life ==
Seymour was born in Moline, Illinois on January 3, 1859. Before the age of five he caught scarlet fever, which left him with permanent hearing loss. This condition has been attributed to his early interest in plants and interest in becoming a naturalist. He attended Illinois University and studied botany as an undergraduate from 1878–1881. While working on his degree, he researched under the tutelage of Thomas J. Burrill, assisting in his study of the parasitic fungi of Illinois.

== Early career ==
Seymour spent his first two years following graduation at the Illinois State Laboratory of Natural History which was spent surveying and indexing rusts from Illinois, during which he discovered new rust species. The results of his findings were published in Parasitic Fungi of Illinois. Part I (Uredineae) and Part II (Erysipheae). It was at this time when he met Franklin Sumner Earle, whom he collaborated with over the course of his career. He then relocated to Harvard University working as an assistant to William Gilson Farlow from 1883 until 1885, including a period they spent at Cambridge. During this time he also assisted Burrill and Earle on several mycological field collections. He spent the next year at the University of Wisconsin teaching general botany courses.

== Harvard Cryptogamic Herbarium ==
In 1886 Seymour married Anna Julia Conkling with which he would have four children: Mary Elizabeth, Rosa Margaret, Frank Conkling, and Edith Katharine. He also received his Masters of Science degree from Illinois University and returned to pursue what has been described as his life’s work at the Harvard Cryptogamic Herbarium. Again working with Farlow, he began organizing and detailing the collection from its early stages into the time it became internationally renowned. He also spent a significant amount of his time cataloging American mycological references when the field was in a state of rapid growth. He and Farlow collaborated on A Provisional Host Index of the Fungi of the United States Part I (1888), Part II (1890), and Part III (1891).

Seymour followed other pursuits during this period. He and Franklin Sumner Earle released the exsiccata Economic Fungi, which illustrated horticultural and weedy plants infected with fungi for easier diagnoses, and totalled eleven fascicles between 1890 and 1899. Between 1892 and 1903 he was co-editor of three other exsiccata works called Decades of North American lichens and Lichenes boreali-americani with Clara Eaton Cummings and Thomas Albert Williams. He also had a passion for natural science education, donating specimens and service to both schools and universities. He also continued lecturing on a part-time basis, both a mycology course at Cambridge and a botany course at Radcliffe College.

== Late life and death ==
Seymour’s the Host Index of the Fungi of North America was published in 1929, which contained over 80,000 parasitic fungi and their hosts, almost four times as many as the Provisional Host Index series. He continued working on the Harvard Mycological Indexes until shortly before his death. On March 29, 1933, he succumbed to heart complications after several weeks of illness in Waverley, Massachusetts.

== Notable publications ==
- 1883. Puccinia heterospora, B. & C. Botanical Gazette. 8: 357-358.
- 1884. (With Burrill, TJ) New species of Urediniae. Botanical Gazette. 9: 187-191.
- 1885. Distribution of Puccinia heterospora. Journal of Mycology. 1: 94.
- 1886. Orchard rusts. Transactions of the American Horticultural Society. 4: 152-160.
- 1886. Some fungus diseases of small fruits. Reports of the Minnesota Horticultural Society. 14: 213-221.
- 1887. Smut of Indian corn. Corn rust. U.S. Department of Agriculture Reports. 1887: 380-382.
- 1887. Character of the injuries produced by parasitic fungi upon their host-plants. American Naturalist. 21: 1114-1117
- 1889. List of fungi collected in 1884 along the Northern Pacific Railroad. Proceedings of the Boston Society of Natural History. 24: 182-191.
- 1890. A race of flowerless plants. American Garden. 11: 79-80; 135-137; 215-217; 276-278; 353-355.
- 1900. The fruiting of Riccia natans. Rhodora. 2: 161.
- 1900. A cluster-cup fungus on Lespedeza in New England. Rhodora. 2: 186.
- 1903. Trichomanes petersii found anew. Torreya. 3: 19-21.
- 1903. A series of specimens illustrating North American Ustiligineae. Journal of Mycology. 9: 83-84.

Editor

- 1889. Cryptogamic Botany A-G. The Century Dictionary.
- 1902. Bibliography of American botany. A subject classification for botanical literature arranged after the Dewey system for the A.A.A.S. Public Libraries. 7: 234-235.

Books

- 1888-1891 (With Farlow WG) A Provisional Host Index of the Fungi of the United States. Parts I-III. Cambridge University Press.
- 1890-1899 (with Earle, FS) Economic fungi. A series of specimens designed chiefly to illustrate the fungus diseases of useful and noxious plants. Fasc. I-XI. Cambridge University Press.
- 1929 Host Index of the Fungi of North America. Harvard University Press.

== See also ==
- List of mycologists
