= Lyromma =

Scientific classification
- Kingdom: Fungi
- Division: Ascomycota
- Class: Eurotiomycetes
- Order: Chaetothyriales
- Family: Lyrommataceae; Lücking (2008)
- Genus: Lyromma; Bat. & H.Maia (1965)

Type species
- Lyromma nectandrae Bat. & H.Maia (1965)

Synonyms
- Anconomyces Cavalc. & A.A.Silva (1972); Lyrommotheca Bat. & T.Herrera (1967)

Genus of lichens

Lyromma is a genus of foliicolous (leaf-dwelling) lichens, and the sole member of Lyrommataceae, a family in the order Chaetothyriales. The genus was circumscribed in 1965 by Brazilian mycologists Augusto Chaves Batista and Heraldo da Silva Maia, with Lyromma nectandrae assigned as the type species. The family was proposed by Robert Lücking in 2008. Characteristics of the genus include the spherical to short barrel-shaped perithecia and elongated barrel-shaped pycnidia, and smooth thalli (lacking a cortex) of rounded patches formed by its symbiotic relationship with green algae from the genus Phycopeltis.

== Species ==
- Lyromma confusum Lücking & Sérus. (2008) – Neotropics
- Lyromma coronatum Flakus & Farkas (2013) – Bolivia
- Lyromma dolicobelum Cavalc. (1972)
- Lyromma multisetulatum Flakus & Farkas (2013) – Bolivia; Brazil
- Lyromma nectandrae Bat. & H.Maia (1965)
- Lyromma ornatum Lücking, Kalb & Sérus. (2000) – Neotropics
- Lyromma palmae (Cavalc. & A.A.Silva) Lücking & Sérus. (1998)
- Lyromma pilosum Lücking (2008) – South America
