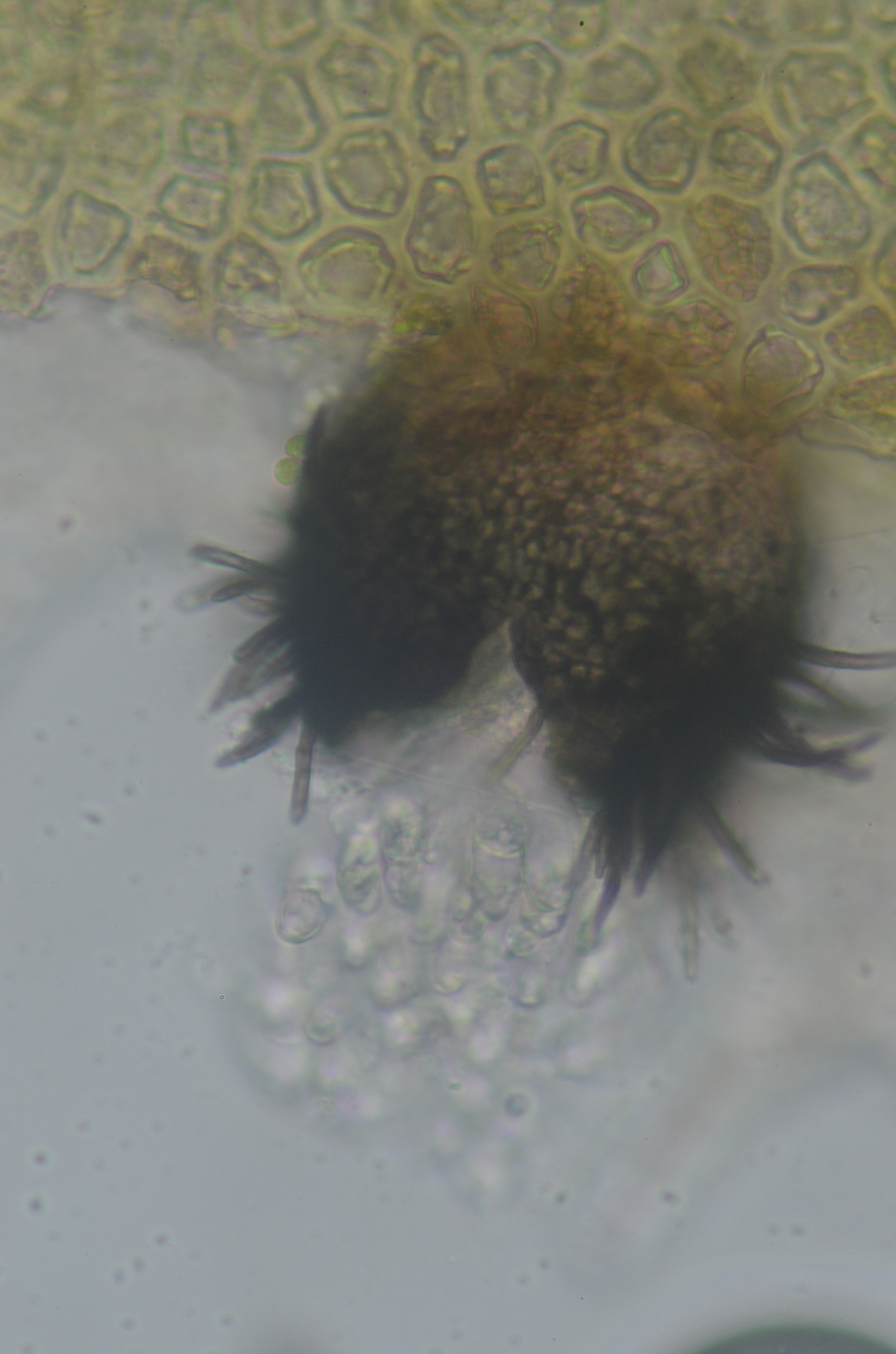
- Epibryon casaresii

Scientific classification
- Kingdom: Fungi
- Division: Ascomycota
- Class: Eurotiomycetes
- Order: Chaetothyriales
- Family: Epibryaceae; S.Stenroos & Gueidan (2014)
- Genus: Epibryon; Döbbeler (1978)

Type species
- Epibryon plagiochilae (Gonz.Frag.) Döbbeler (1978)

= Epibryon =

Genus of fungi

Epibryon is a genus of fungi, and the sole genus in the monogeneric family Epibryaceae. It has about 40 species. Many of the species grow parasitically on bryophytes. The genus was circumscribed by mycologist Peter Döbbeler in 1978; the family by Soili Stenroos and Cécile Gueidan in 2014.

== Species ==
- Epibryon andinum Döbbeler (2006)
- Epibryon arachnoideum Döbbeler (1978)
- Epibryon bryophilum (Fuckel) Döbbeler (1978)
- Epibryon bubakii (Gonz.Frag.) Döbbeler (1978)
- Epibryon casaresii (Bubák & Gonz.Frag.) Döbbeler (1978)
- Epibryon chorisodontii Spooner (1980)
- Epibryon conductrix (Norman ex Th.Fr.) Nik.Hoffm. & Hafellner (2000)
- Epibryon craspedum Döbbeler (1982)
- Epibryon cryptosphaericum Döbbeler (1979)
- Epibryon dawsoniae Döbbeler (1978)
- Epibryon deceptor Döbbeler (1998)
- Epibryon diaphanum Döbbeler (1979)
- Epibryon dicrani (Racov.) Döbbeler (1978)
- Epibryon elegantissimum Döbbeler (1978)
- Epibryon endocarpum Döbbeler (1980)
- Epibryon eremita Döbbeler (1999)
- Epibryon filiforme Döbbeler & Menjívar (1992)
- Epibryon hepaticicola (Racov.) Döbbeler (1978)
- Epibryon hypophyllum Döbbeler (1979)
- Epibryon intercapillare Döbbeler (1979)
- Epibryon intercellulare Döbbeler (1979)
- Epibryon interlamellare (Racov.) Döbbeler (1978)
- Epibryon intracellulare Döbbeler (1978)
- Epibryon kondratyukii Khodos. & Darmostuk (2019)
- Epibryon leucobryi Döbbeler & Poelt (1978)
- Epibryon lichenicola Matzer (1996)
- Epibryon maculosum Döbbeler & Hertel (1983)
- Epibryon marsupidii Döbbeler (1979)
- Epibryon metzgeriae (Racov.) Döbbeler (1978)
- Epibryon muscicola (Racov.) Döbbeler (1978)
- Epibryon notabile Döbbeler (1978)
- Epibryon odontophilum Döbbeler (1981)
- Epibryon parvipunctum (Stein) Diederich (1999)
- Epibryon pedinophylli Döbbeler (1998)
- Epibryon perrumpens Döbbeler (1982)
- Epibryon plagiochilae (Gonz.Frag.) Döbbeler (1978)
- Epibryon platycarpum Döbbeler & T.Franke (2016)
- Epibryon pogonati-urnigeri Döbbeler (1978)
- Epibryon polyphagum Döbbeler (1978)
- Epibryon polysporum Döbbeler (1978)
- Epibryon pulchellum Döbbeler (2003)
- Epibryon scapaniae (Racov.) Döbbeler (1978)
- Epibryon semitectum Döbbeler (2016)
- Epibryon solorinae (Vain.) Nik.Hoffm. & Hafellner (2000)
- Epibryon trichostomi Nav.-Ros., Hladun & Alvaro (2019)
- Epibryon tripartitum Döbbeler (1982)
- Epibryon turfosorum (Mouton) Döbbeler (1978)
- Epibryon ventrale Döbbeler & P.G.Davison (2019)
