= Dennisiella =

Scientific classification
- Domain: Eukaryota
- Kingdom: Fungi
- Division: Ascomycota
- Class: Eurotiomycetes
- Order: Chaetothyriales
- Family: Coccodiniaceae
- Genus: Dennisiella; Bat. & Cif. (1962)

Type species
- Dennisiella babingtonii (Berk.) Bat. & Cif. (1962)

Species
- D. asetosa D. babingtonii D. caucasica D. coussapoae D. ekmanii D. fusispora D. longispora D. setosa D. theae

Synonyms
- Capnodium subgen. Microxiphium Harv. ex Berk. & Desm. (1849); Microxiphium (Harv. ex Berk. & Desm.) Thüm. (1879); Vitalia Cif. & Bat. (1962)

Genus of fungi

Dennisiella is a genus of fungi in the family Coccodiniaceae. It has 9 species. The genus was circumscribed by mycologists Augusto Chaves Batista and Raffaele Ciferri in 1962, with Dennisiella babingtonii designated as the type species. The generic name honours British mycologist R. W. G. Dennis. Fungi in this genus are epifoliar; that is, they live on living plant surfaces, particularly leaves.

== Species ==
- Dennisiella asetosa D.R.Reynolds & G.S.Gilbert (2005) – Australia
- Dennisiella babingtonii (Berk.) Bat. & Cif. (1962)
- Dennisiella caucasica (Woron.) Bat. & Cif. (1962)
- Dennisiella coussapoae F.B.Rocha, J.L.Bezerra & R.W.Barreto (2010) – Brazil (host: Coussapoa floccosa)
- Dennisiella ekmanii (Petr. & Cif.) S.Hughes (1976)
- Dennisiella fusispora (L.R.Fraser) S.Hughes (1976) – Australia
- Dennisiella longispora Mig.Rodr. (1985) – Cuba (host: Zanthoxylum martinicense)
- Dennisiella setosa (Woron.) Bat. & Cif. (1962)
- Dennisiella theae (Sawada) Bat. & Cif. (1962)
