= Actinocymbe =

Scientific classification
- Kingdom: Fungi
- Division: Ascomycota
- Class: Eurotiomycetes
- Order: Chaetothyriales
- Family: Chaetothyriaceae
- Genus: Actinocymbe; Höhn.

Type species
- Actinocymbe separato-setosa (Henn.) Höhn.

Genus of fungi

Actinocymbe is a genus of fungi in the family Chaetothyriaceae.
