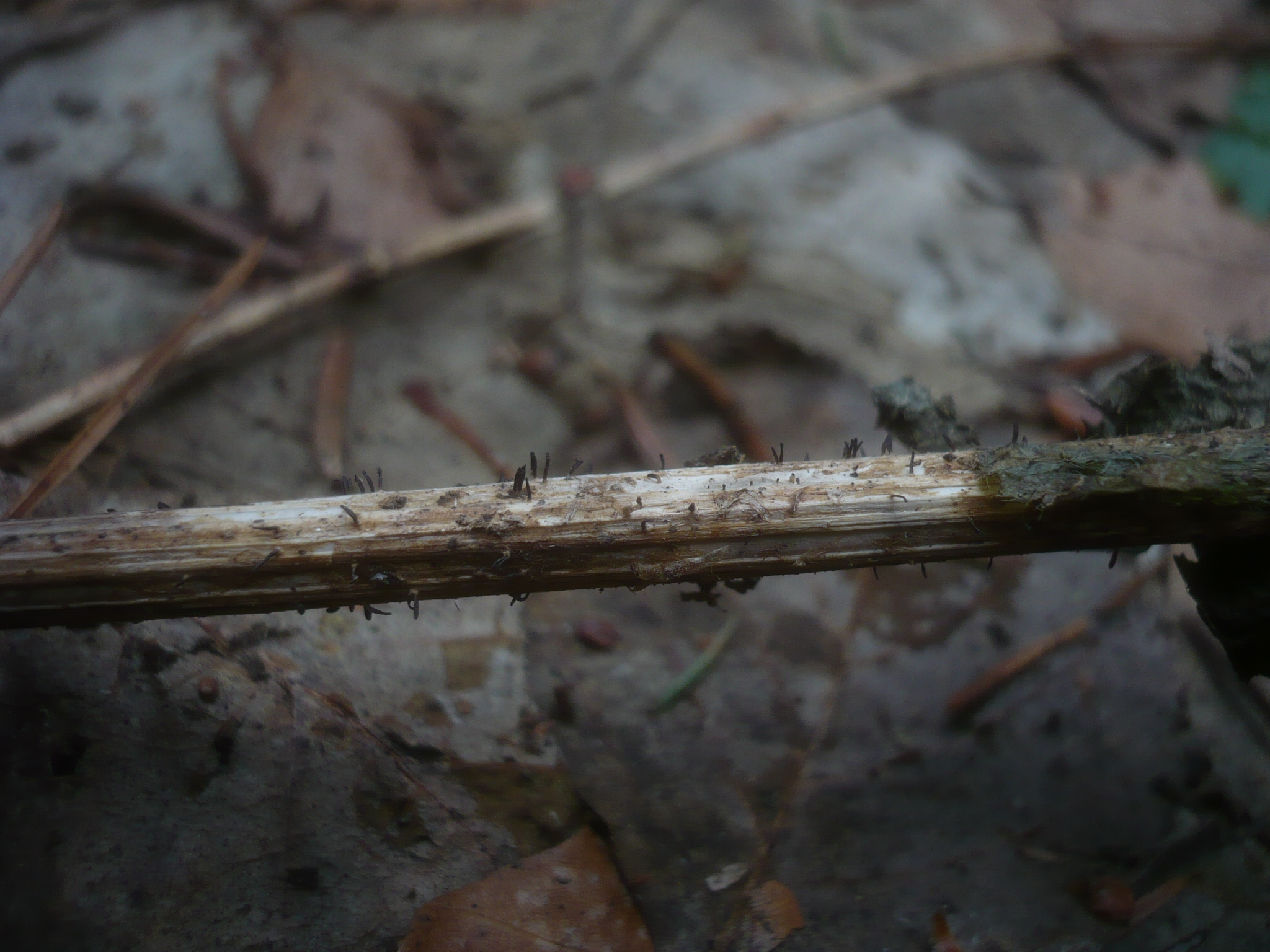
- Acrospermum compressum

Scientific classification
- Kingdom: Fungi
- Division: Ascomycota
- Class: Dothideomycetes
- Order: Acrospermales; Minter, Peredo & A.T. Watson (2007)
- Family: Acrospermaceae; Fuckel (1870)

Type genus
- Acrospermum Tode (1790)

= Acrospermaceae =

Family of fungi

The Acrospermaceae are a family of fungi in the monotypic order Acrospermales.

The family was placed in the monotypic order of Acrospermales in 2007.

== Genera ==
As accepted by Wijayawardene et al. 2020 (with amount of species);

- Acrospermum Tode (12)
- Gonatophragmium Deighton (8)
- Oomyces Berk. & Broome (10)
- Pseudoacrospermum Crous (1)

Note; Genera incertae sedis - Pseudovirgaria H.D. Shin, U. Braun, Arzanlou & Crous (2)
