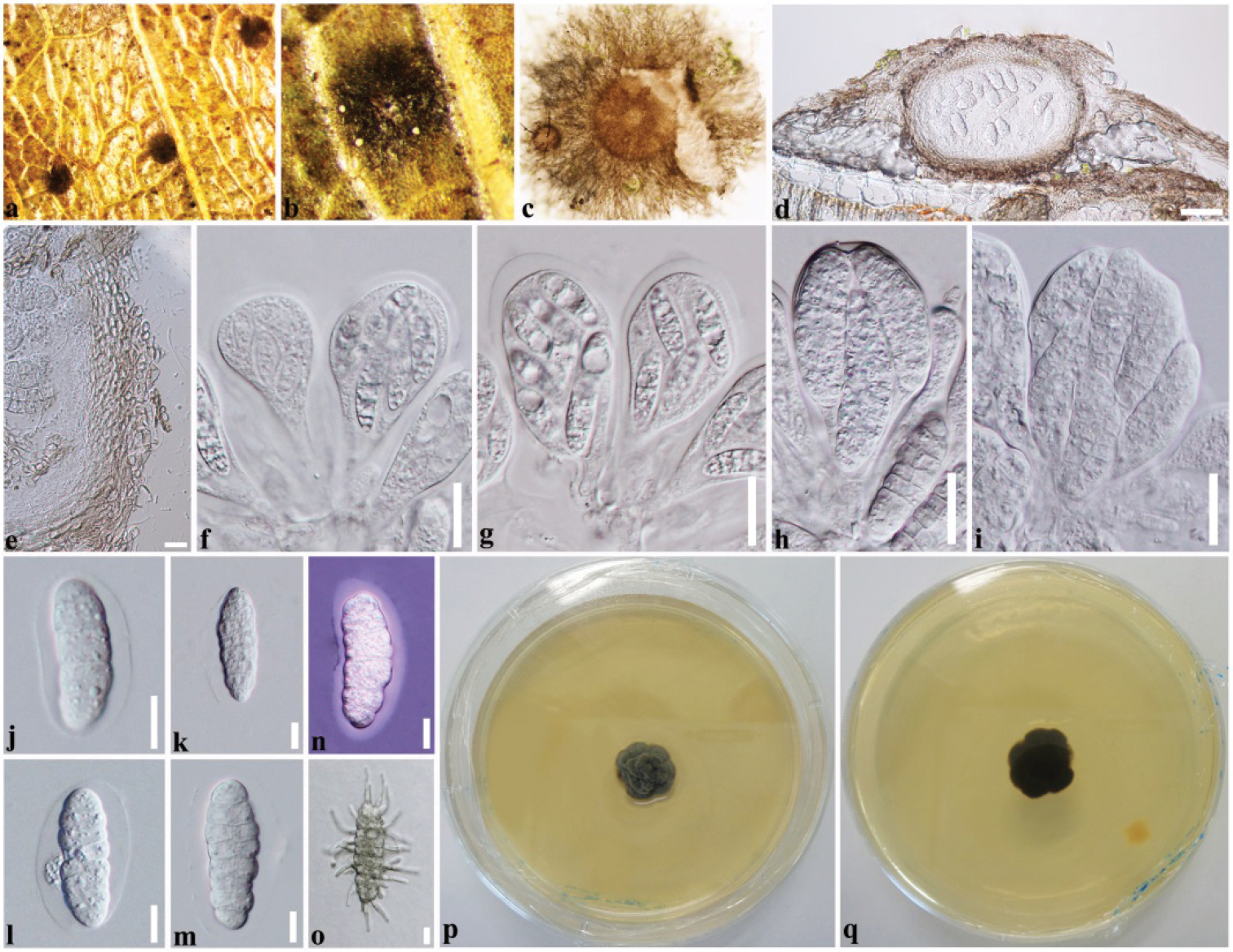
- Ceramothyrium longivolcaniforme

Scientific classification
- Kingdom: Fungi
- Division: Ascomycota
- Class: Eurotiomycetes
- Order: Chaetothyriales
- Family: Chaetothyriaceae
- Genus: Ceramothyrium; Bat. & H.Maia (1956)

Type species
- Ceramothyrium paiveae Bat. & H.Maia (1956)

Species
- C. carniolicum C. linnaeae C. longivolcaniforme C. lycopodii C. ryukyuense

Synonyms
- Stanhughesia Constant. (1989)

= Ceramothyrium =

Genus of fungi

Ceramothyrium is a genus of ascomycete fungi in the family Chaetothyriaceae.

In 2024, Ceramothyrium ryukyuense was described from Okinawa Island, Japan, as the first lichen-forming member of Ceramothyrium – and the first confirmed lichenised lineage in the family Chaetothyriaceae – forming a thin, leaf-dwelling thallus with a Trentepohliales green-algal photobiont partner.
