= Byrsomyces =

Scientific classification
- Kingdom: Fungi
- Division: Ascomycota
- Class: Sordariomycetes
- Informal group: Sordariomycetes incertae sedis
- Genus: Byrsomyces; Cavalc. (1972)

Type species
- Byrsomyces olivaceus Cavalc. (1972)

Genus of fungi

Byrsomyces is a fungal genus in the class Sordariomycetes. The relationship of this taxon to other taxa within the class is unknown (incertae sedis). A monotypic genus, Byrsomyces contains the single species Byrsomyces olivaceus.
