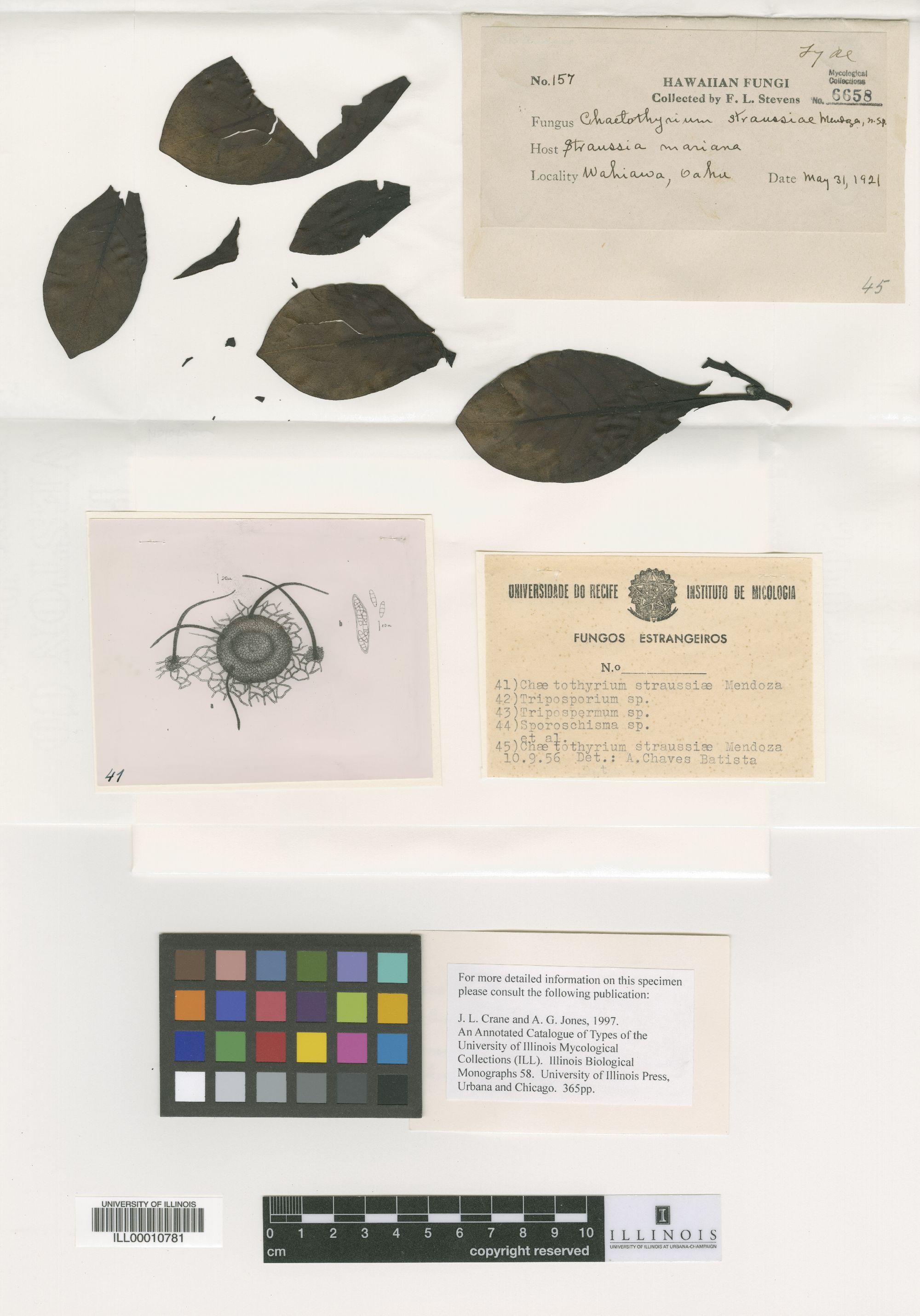
- Chaetothyrium straussiae on Straussia mariniana

Scientific classification
- Kingdom: Fungi
- Division: Ascomycota
- Class: Eurotiomycetes
- Order: Chaetothyriales
- Family: Chaetothyriaceae; Hansf. ex M.E.Barr (1979)

= Chaetothyriaceae =

Family of fungi

The Chaetothyriaceae are a family of ascomycetous fungi within the order Chaetothyriales and within the class Eurotiomycetes. A 2012 molecular analysis of specimens collected from northern Thailand revealed three new species in the family (Ceramothyrium thailandicum, Chaetothyrium brischofiacola and Phaeosaccardinula ficus).

== Lichenization ==
The first known lichen-forming species in Chaetothyriaceae, Ceramothyrium ryukyuense, was described in 2024 from Okinawa Island in southern Japan. It was found growing on a living palm leaf in a subtropical coastal forest. The species is characterized by minute, brown ascomata and small, predominantly one-septate ascospores. It differs from non-lichenized Ceramothyrium species, such as C. paiveae and C. philodendri, in its smaller asci and simpler spore structure. Phylogenetic analyses based on nuclear ribosomal DNA sequences placed C. ryukyuense as a sister species to C. exiguum. The species is associated with a photobiont from the Trentepohliales, marking the first confirmed case of lichenization within the family.

== Genera ==
- Actinocymbe Höhn. (1911)
- Ainsworthia Bat. & Cif. (1962)
- Almeidaea Cif. & Bat. 1962
- Ceramothyrium Bat. & H.Maia (1956)
- Chaetothyrium Speg. (1888)
- Chaetothyriomyces Pereira-Carv., Inácio & Dianese (2009)
- Euceramia Bat. & Cif. (1962)
- Microcallis Syd. (1926)
- Mycostevensonia Bat. & Cif. (1962)
- Phaeosaccardinula Henn. (1905)
- Treubiomyces Höhn. (1909)
- Yatesula Syd. & P.Syd. (1917)
