= Clara Eaton Cummings =

American cryptogamic botanist

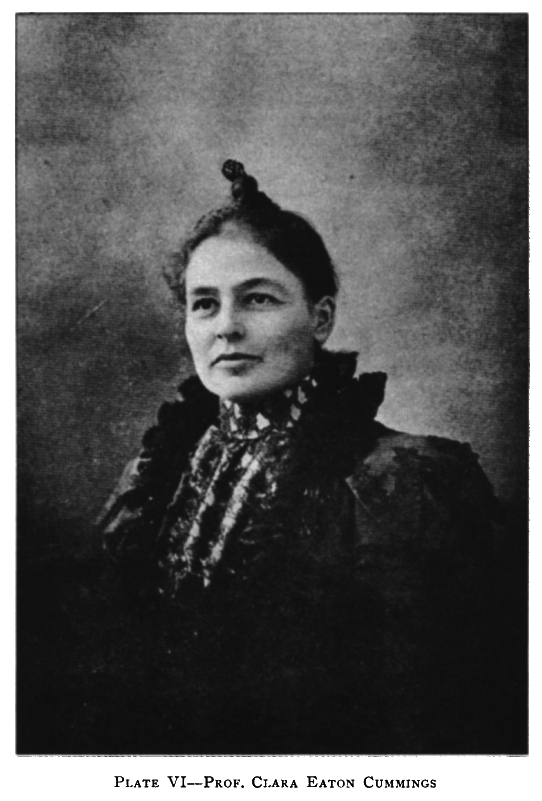
- Born: 13 July 1855; Plymouth, New Hampshire, US
- Died: 28 December 1906 (aged 51); Concord, New Hampshire, US
- Scientific career
- Fields: Botany
- Workplaces: Wellesley College

Clara Eaton Cummings (13 July 1855 – 28 December 1906) was an American cryptogamic botanist and Hunnewell Professor of Cryptogamic Botany at Wellesley College in Massachusetts.

== Life and education ==
Cummings was born in Plymouth, New Hampshire, on July 13, 1855 to Noah Conner and Elmira George Cummings. In 1876, she enrolled at the women's liberal arts college Wellesley, only one year after the opening of the institution.

== Career ==
Cummings primarily studied cryptogamous (spore-reproducing) plants such as mosses and lichens. She characterized hundreds of lichen specimens but was "very conservative" on declaring new species. Much of her work appeared in the books of other botanists, although she did publish a catalog of liverworts and mosses of North America in 1885.

She became a curator at the botanical museum at Wellesley from 1878–79 and was hired at Wellesley as an associate professor of botany for the 1879 school year. In 1886 and 1887 she studied under Dr. Arnold Dodel at the University of Zurich where she did private work and prepared charts for a Cryptogamic Botany illustration. While in Europe, she traveled to various botanical gardens to study some of the great botanists. After returning from Zurich, Cummings became an associate professor of cryptogamic botany at Wellesey. Between 1892 and 1903 she published four exsiccata works called Decades of North American lichens and Lichenes boreali-americani, three of them with Thomas Albert Williams and Arthur Bliss Seymour as co-editors.

In 1904, she published a catalog of 217 species of Alaskan lichens collected during the Harriman Expedition which included 76 species new to Alaska and at least two species new to science.

In February and March 1905, Cummings took a trip to Jamaica where she collected lichens. After her death, her collection was sent to the New York Botanical Garden.

Cummings was an associate editor of Plant World and named in 1899 a fellow of the American Association for the Advancement of Science. She became a member of the Society of Plant Morphology and Physiology and served as Vice President in 1904. She was a member of the Mycological society, the Torrey Botanical Club, the Boston Mycological Club, and the Boston Society of Natural History.

== Partial bibliography ==
- Catalogue of Musci and Hepaticae of North America, North of Mexico (1885)
- The Lichens of Alaska (1904)
