= Santisukia =

Scientific classification
- Kingdom: Plantae
- Clade: Tracheophytes
- Clade: Angiosperms
- Clade: Eudicots
- Clade: Asterids
- Order: Lamiales
- Family: Bignoniaceae
- Genus: Santisukia; Brummitt

Synonyms
- Barnettia Santisuk

Genus of flowering plant

Santisukia is a genus of flowering plants belonging to the family Bignoniaceae.

It is native to Thailand.

The genus name of Santisukia is in honour of Thawatchai Santisuk (b. 1944), a Thai herbarium director in Bangkok. It was first described and published in Kew Bull. Vol.47 on page 436 in 1992.

== Known species ==
According to Kew:

- Santisukia kerrii (Barnett & Sandwith) Brummitt
- Santisukia pagetii (Craib) Brummitt
