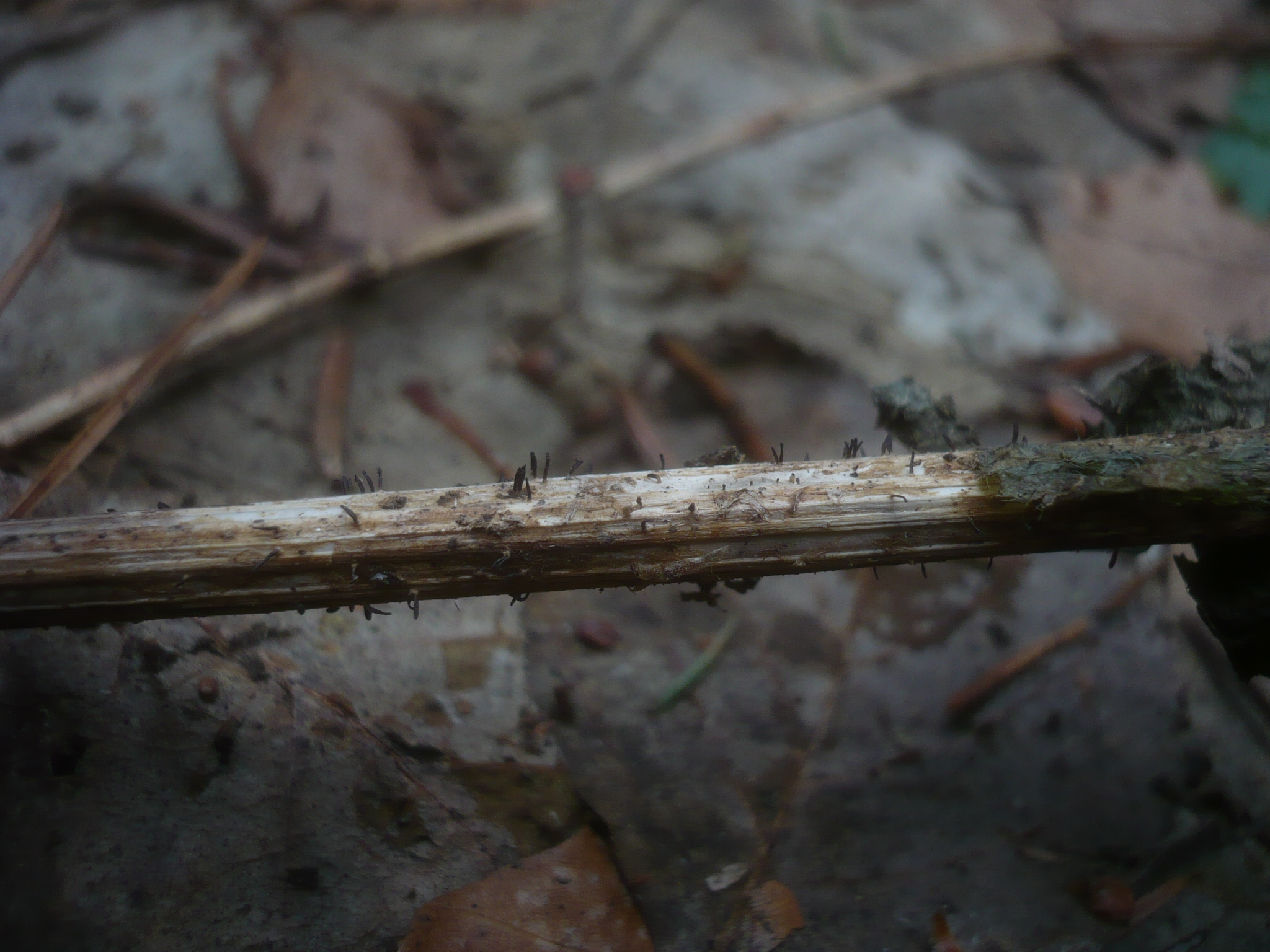
- Acrospermum compressum

Scientific classification
- Kingdom: Fungi
- Division: Ascomycota
- Class: Dothideomycetes
- Order: Acrospermales
- Family: Acrospermaceae
- Genus: Acrospermum; Tode (1790)

Type species
- Acrospermum compressum Tode (1790)

= Acrospermum =

Genus of fungi

Acrospermum is a genus of fungi within the Acrospermaceae family.

== Species ==
- Acrospermum adeanum
- Acrospermum antennariicola
- Acrospermum bromeliacearum
- Acrospermum chilense
- Acrospermum compressum
- Acrospermum coniforme
- Acrospermum cuneolum
- Acrospermum cylindricum
- Acrospermum daphniphylli
- Acrospermum elmeri
- Acrospermum erikssonii
- Acrospermum fluxile
- Acrospermum gaubae
- Acrospermum graminum
- Acrospermum kirulisianum
- Acrospermum latissimum
- Acrospermum maxonii
- Acrospermum ochraceum
- Acrospermum ophioboloides
- Acrospermum pallidulum
- Acrospermum parasiticum
- Acrospermum puiggarii
- Acrospermum savulescui
- Acrospermum syconophilum
- Acrospermum viticola
