= Chaetothyriomycetes =

Chaetothyriomycetidae

Scientific classification
- Kingdom: Fungi
- Division: Ascomycota
- Class: Eurotiomycetes
- Subclass: Chaetothyriomycetes

Orders
- Arthoniales (lichens); Chaetothyriales

Subclass of fungi

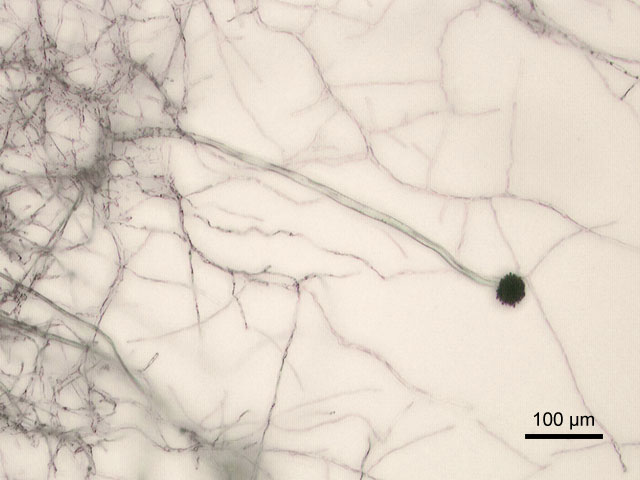
Microscopic image (100x) of Aspergillus Niger

Chaetothyriomycetidae is a subclass of fungi within the Eurotiomycetes. They are collectively termed the black yeasts. The subclass was revised in 2014.
