= Microcallis =

Scientific classification
- Kingdom: Fungi
- Division: Ascomycota
- Class: Eurotiomycetes
- Order: Chaetothyriales
- Family: Chaetothyriaceae
- Genus: Microcallis; Syd.

Type species
- Microcallis phoebes Syd.

Genus of fungi

Microcallis is a genus of fungi in the family Chaetothyriaceae.
