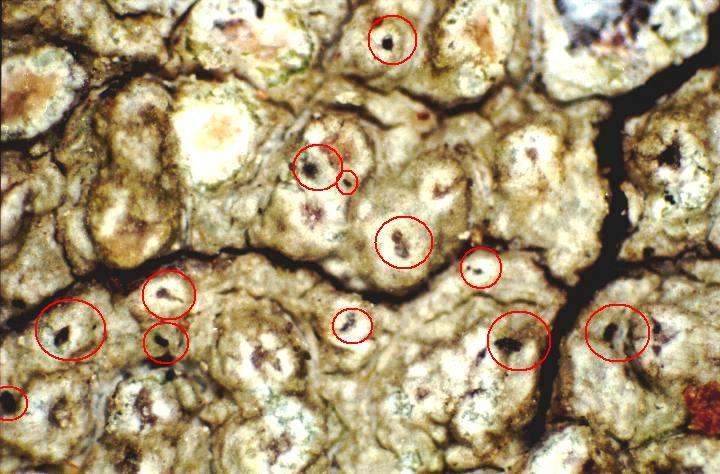
- photograph of an herbarium specimen taken through a dissecting microscope (x40) showing the black apothecia (within the red circles) of Lichenodiplis lecanorae parasitizing the apothecia of Pertusaria xanthodes

Scientific classification
- Kingdom: Fungi
- Division: Ascomycota
- Subdivision: Pezizomycotina
- Class: incertae sedis
- Genus: Lichenodiplis; Dyko & D.Hawksw., 1979

Species
- See text

= Lichenodiplis =

Genus of fungi

Lichenodiplis is a genus of fungi with uncertain classification.

The genus was first described by Dyko and David Leslie Hawksworth in 1979.

The genus has cosmopolitan distribution.

Species:

- Lichenodiplis lecanorae (Vouaux) Dyko & D.Hawksw., 1979
- Lichenodiplis lichenicola Dyko & D.Hawksw., 1979
- Lichenodiplis pertusariicola
