= Coccodiniaceae =

Scientific classification
- Kingdom: Fungi
- Division: Ascomycota
- Class: Eurotiomycetes
- Order: Chaetothyriales
- Family: Coccodiniaceae; Höhn. ex O.E.Erikss. (1981)

Type genus
- Coccodinium A.Massal. (1860)

Genera
- Coccodinium; Dennisiella; Limacinula; Shanoriella

Family of fungi

The Coccodiniaceae are a family of fungi in the order Chaetothyriales. The family was circumscribed in 1918 by Franz Xaver Rudolf von Höhnel as "Coccodiniaceen" (an invalid naming according to the rules of fungal taxonomy), the family was renamed by O.E. Eriksson in 1981. Species in the family have a widespread distribution and typically grow epiphytically or biotrophically on leaves and stems.
