= Ascus =

Spore-bearing cell in ascomycete fungi

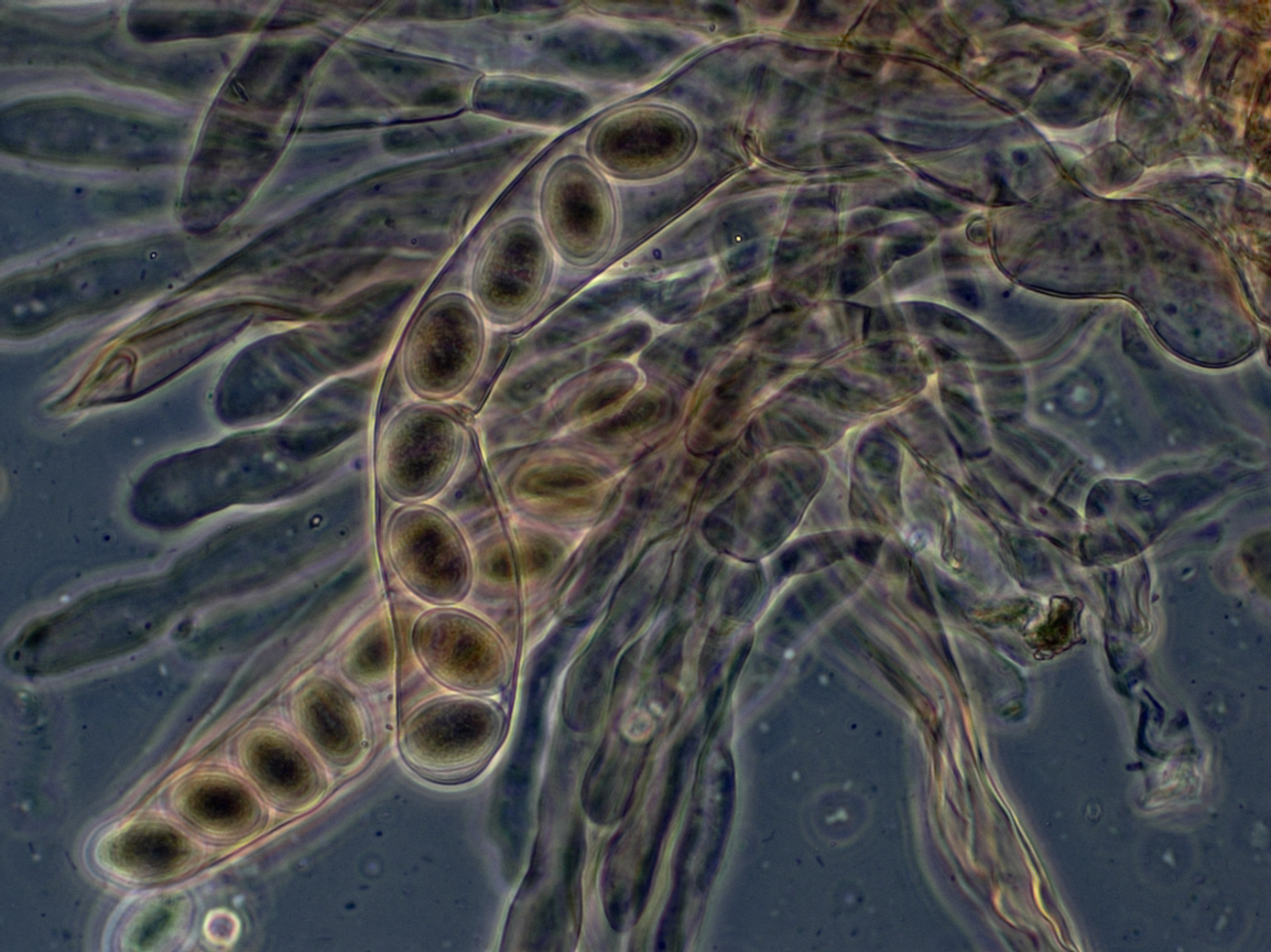
Asci of Morchella elata, Phase contrast image

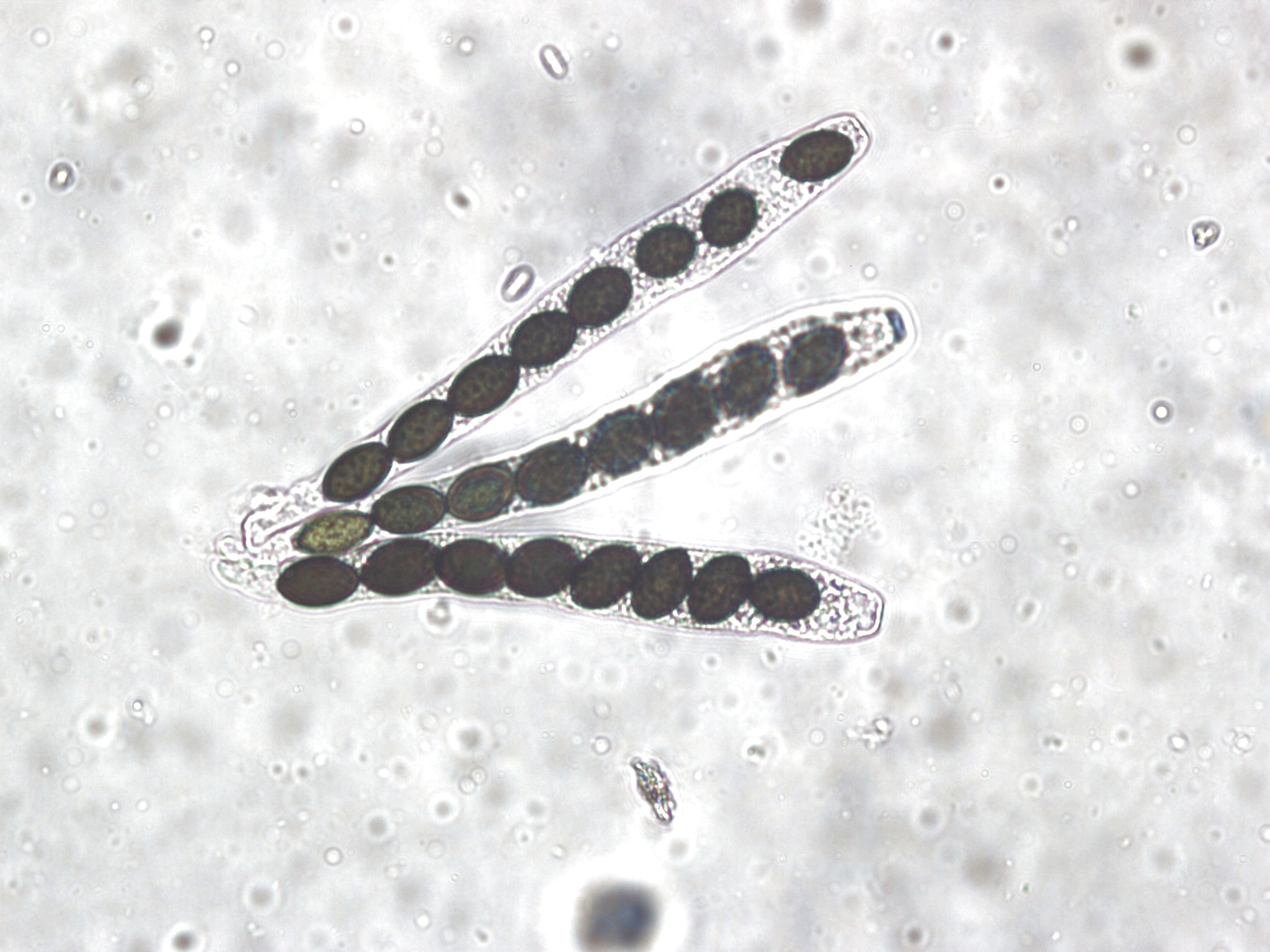
There are eight ascospores in each ascus of Sordaria fimicola.

An ascus (from Ancient Greek ἀσκός (askós) 'skin bag, wineskin'; pl.: asci) is the sexual spore-bearing cell produced in ascomycete fungi. Each ascus usually contains eight ascospores (or octad), produced by meiosis followed, in most species, by a mitotic cell division. However, asci in some genera or species can occur in numbers of one (e.g. Monosporascus cannonballus), two, four, or multiples of four. In a few cases, the ascospores can bud off conidia that may fill the asci (e.g. Tympanis) with hundreds of conidia, or the ascospores may fragment, e.g. some Cordyceps, also filling the asci with smaller cells. Ascospores are nonmotile, usually single celled, but not infrequently may be coenocytic (lacking a septum), and in some cases coenocytic in multiple planes. Mitotic divisions within the developing spores populate each resulting cell in septate ascospores with nuclei. The term ocular chamber, or oculus, refers to the epiplasm (the portion of cytoplasm not used in ascospore formation) that is surrounded by the "bourrelet" (the thickened tissue near the top of the ascus).

Typically, a single ascus will contain eight ascospores (or octad). The eight spores are produced by meiosis followed by a mitotic division. Two meiotic divisions turn the original diploid zygote nucleus into four haploid ones. That is, the single original diploid cell from which the whole process begins contains two complete sets of chromosomes. In preparation for meiosis, all the DNA of both sets is duplicated, to make a total of four sets. The nucleus that contains the four sets divides twice, separating into four new nuclei – each of which has one complete set of chromosomes. Following this process, each of the four new nuclei duplicates its DNA and undergoes a division by mitosis. As a result, the ascus will contain four pairs of spores. Then the ascospores are released from the ascus.

In many cases the asci are formed in a regular layer, the hymenium, in a fruiting body which is visible to the naked eye, here called an ascocarp or ascoma. In other cases, such as single-celled yeasts, no such structures are found. In rare cases asci of some genera can regularly develop inside older discharged asci one after another, e.g. Dipodascus.

Asci normally release their spores by bursting at the tip, but they may also digest themselves, passively releasing the ascospores either in a liquid or as a dry powder. Discharging asci usually have a specially differentiated tip, either a pore or an operculum. In some hymenium forming genera, when one ascus bursts, it can trigger the bursting of many other asci in the ascocarp resulting in a massive discharge visible as a cloud of spores – the phenomenon called "puffing". This is an example of positive feedback. A faint hissing sound can also be heard for species of Peziza and other cup fungi.

Asci, notably those of Neurospora crassa, have been used in laboratories for studying the process of meiosis, because the four cells produced by meiosis line up in regular order. By modifying genes coding for spore color and nutritional requirements, the biologist can study crossing over and other phenomena. The formation of asci and their use in genetic analysis are described in detail in Neurospora crassa.

Asci of most Pezizomycotina develop after the formation of croziers at their base. The croziers help maintain a brief dikaryon. The compatible nuclei of the dikaryon merge forming a diploid nucleus that then undergoes meiosis and ultimately internal ascospore formation. Members of the Taphrinomycotina and Saccharomycotina do not form croziers.

== Classification ==
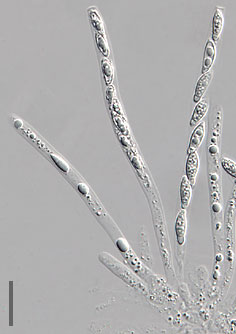
Asci of Hypomyces chrysospermus (they are unitunicate-inoperculate). DIC image.

The form of the ascus, the capsule which contains the sexual spores, is important for classification of the Ascomycota. There are four basic types of ascus.

- A unitunicate-operculate ascus has a "lid", the Operculum, which breaks open when the spores are mature and allows the spores to escape. Unitunicate-operculate asci only occur in those ascocarps which have apothecia, for instance the morels. 'Unitunicate' means 'single-walled'.
- Instead of an operculum, a unitunicate-inoperculate ascus has an elastic ring that functions like a pressure valve. Once mature the elastic ring briefly expands and lets the spores shoot out. This type appears both in apothecia and in perithecia; an example is the illustrated Hypomyces chrysospermus.
- A bitunicate ascus is enclosed in a double wall. This consists of a thin, brittle outer shell and a thick elastic inner wall. When the spores are mature, the shell splits open so that the inner wall can take up water. As a consequence this begins to extend with its spores until it protrudes above the rest of the ascocarp so that the spores can escape into free air without being obstructed by the bulk of the fruiting body. Bitunicate asci occur only in pseudothecia and are found only in the classes Dothideomycetes and Chaetothyriomycetes (which were formerly united in the old class Loculoascomycetes). Examples: Venturia inaequalis (apple scab) and Guignardia aesculi (Brown Leaf Mold of Horse Chestnut).
- Prototunicate asci are mostly spherical in shape and have no mechanism for forcible dispersal. The mature ascus wall dissolves allowing the spores to escape, or it is broken open by other influences, such as animals. Asci of this type can be found both in perithecia and in cleistothecia, for instance with Dutch elm disease (Ophiostoma). This is something of a catch-all term for cases which do not fit into the other three ascus types, and they probably belong to several independent groups which evolved separately from unitunicate asci.
