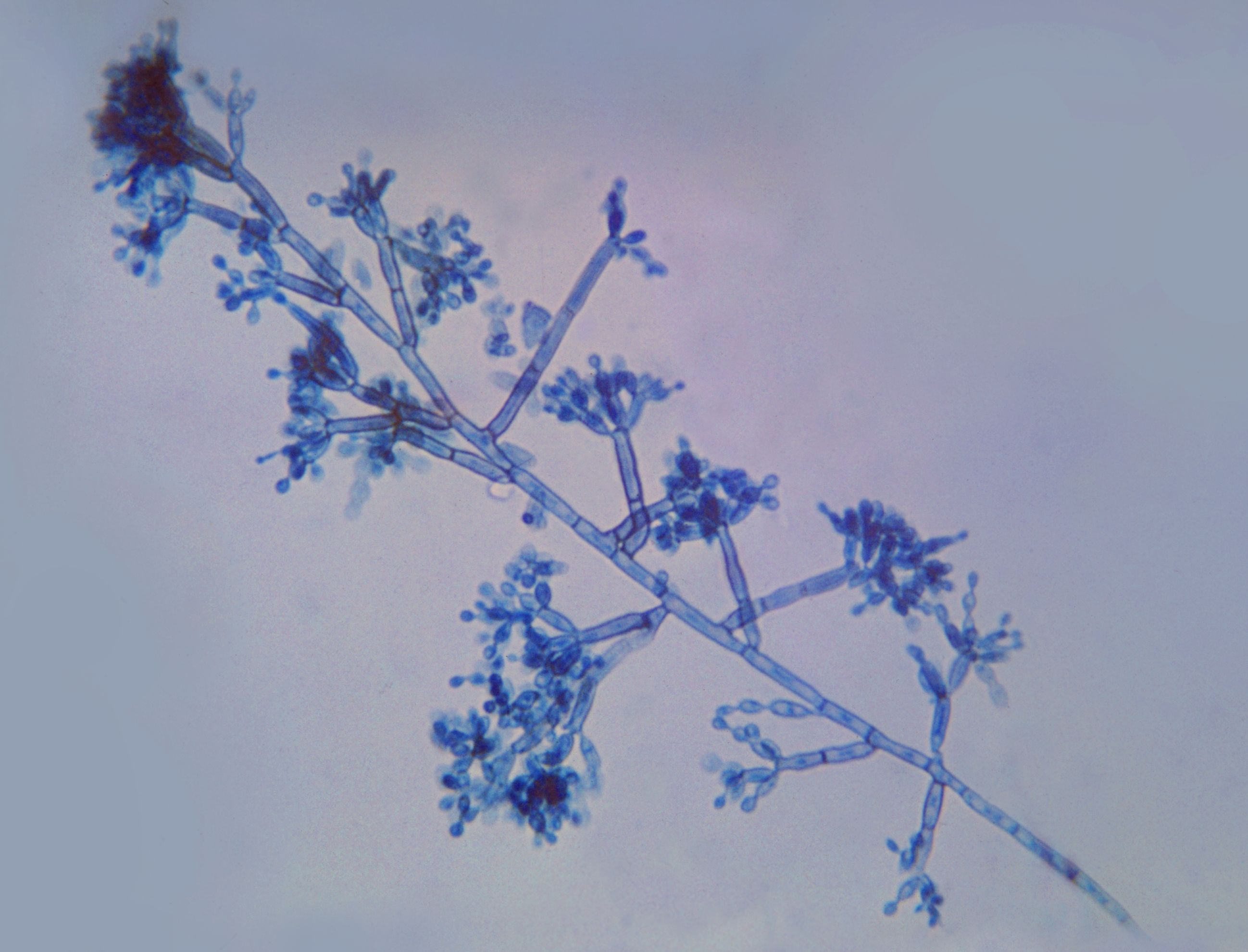
- Fonsecaea pedrosoi

Scientific classification
- Kingdom: Fungi
- Division: Ascomycota
- Class: Eurotiomycetes
- Subclass: Chaetothyriomycetidae
- Order: Chaetothyriales; M.E.Barr (1987)

Families
- Chaetothyriaceae; Coccodiniaceae; Cyphellophoraceae; Epibryaceae; Herpotrichiellaceae; Lyrommataceae; Microtheliopsidaceae; Paracladophialophoraceae; Pyrenotrichaceae; Trichomeriaceae

= Chaetothyriales =

Order of fungi

The Chaetothyriales are an order of ascomycetous fungi in the class Eurotiomycetes and within the subclass Chaetothyriomycetidae. The order was circumscribed in 1987 by mycologist Margaret Elizabeth Barr-Bigelow.

== Families and genera ==
As of October 2021, Species Fungorum includes 9 families, 97 genera, and 691 species in the Chaetothyriales. The following list shows the families, genera, and number of species in the Chaetothyriales, adapted from a recent (2020) taxonomic and nomenclatural review of the order.

- Chaetothyriaceae Hansf. ex M.E.Barr (1979)

Actinocymbe – 3 spp.
Aithaloderma – 12 spp.
Aphanophora – 1 sp.
Arthrophiala – 1 sp.
Camptophora – 2 spp.
Ceramothyrium – 39 spp.
Ceratocarpia – 3 spp.
Chaetothyriomyces – 1 sp.
Chaetothyrium – 67 spp.
Cyphellophoriella – 1 sp.
Euceramia – 3 spp.
Longihyalospora – 2 spp.
Microcallis – 9spp.
Nullicamyces – 1 sp.
Phaeosaccardinula – 41 spp.
Stanhughesia – 4 sp.
Treubiomyces – 7 spp.
Vonarxia – 2 spp.
Yatesula – 2 spp.

- Coccodiniaceae Höhn. ex O.E.Erikss. (1981)

Coccodinium – 4 spp.
Dennisiella – 9 spp.
Limacinula – 17 spp.

- Cyphellophoraceae Réblová & Unter. (2013)

Anthopsis – 3 spp.
Cyphellophora – 25 spp.

- Epibryaceae S.Stenroos & Gueidan (2014)

Epibryon – 47 spp.

- Herpotrichiellaceae Munk (1953)

Aculeata – 1 sp.
Atrokylindriopsis – 1 sp.
Brycekendrickomyces – 1 sp.
Capronia – ca. 81 spp.
Cladophialophora – 41 spp.
Exophiala – 59 spp.
Fonsecaea – 16 spp.
Marinophialophora – 1 sp.
Melanoctona – 1 sp.
Metulocladosporiella – 6 spp.
Minimelanolocus – 34 spp.
Phialophora – 7 spp.
Pleomelogramma – 2 spp.
Rhinocladiella – 21 spp.
Sorocybe – 3 spp.
Thysanorea – 14 spp.
Veronaea – 20 spp.

- Lyrommataceae Lücking (2008)

Lyromma – 7 spp.

- Microtheliopsidaceae O.E.Erikss. (1981)

Microtheliopsis – 4 spp.

- Paracladophialophoraceae Crous (2018)

Paracladophialophora – 2 spp.

- Pyrenotrichaceae Zahlbr (1926)

Pyrenothrix – 2 spp.
Neophaeococcomyces – 4 spp.

- Trichomeriaceae Chomnunti & K.D.Hyde (2013)

Arthrocladium – 4 spp.
Bacillicladium – 1 sp.
Bradymyces – 3 spp.
Knufia – 14 spp.
Lithohypha – 1 sp.
Neostrelitziana – 1 sp.
Strelitziana – 8 spp.
Trichomerium – 36 spp.

== Genera incertae sedis ==
Several genera have been included in the Chaetothyriales although their familial placement is unknown. These include:

- Lichenodiplis Dyko & D.Hawksw. (1979) – 13 spp.
- Lichenodiplisiella S.Y.Kondr. & Kudratov (2002) – 1 sp.
- Melnikomyces Crous & U.Braun – 1 sp.
- Minutoexcipula V.Atienza & D.Hawksw. (1994) – 7 spp.
- Muellerella Hepp ex Müll. Arg. (1862) – 14 spp.
- Pleostigma Kirschst. (1939) – 9 spp.
- Sarcinomyces Lindner (1898) – 5 spp.
- Uncispora R.C.Sinclair & Morgan-Jones (1979) – 3 spp.
