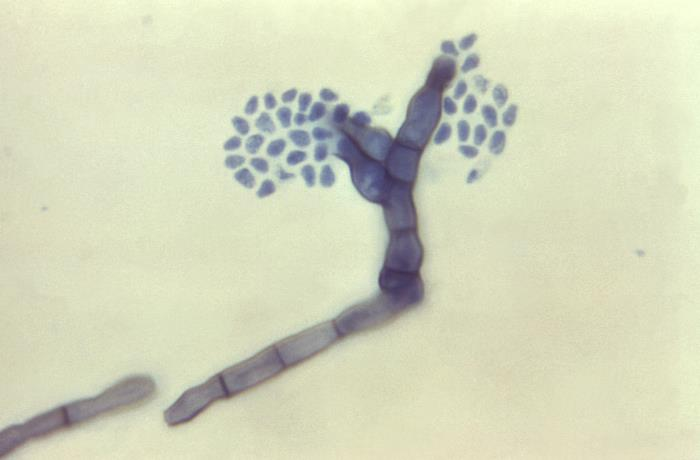
- Microscope image of Fonsecaea compacta at 1000X magnification

Scientific classification
- Kingdom: Fungi
- Division: Ascomycota
- Class: Eurotiomycetes
- Order: Chaetothyriales
- Family: Herpotrichiellaceae
- Genus: Fonsecaea
- Species: F. compacta

Binomial name
- Fonsecaea compacta (Carrion) Carrion (1940)

Synonyms
- Hormodendrum compactum Carrion (1935); Phialoconidiophora compacta Carrion (1936); Fonsecaea compactum (Carrion) Carrion (1940); Phialophora compacta (Carrion) Redaelli & Cif. (1942); Rhinocladiella compacta (Carrion) Schol-Schwarz (1968); Rhinocladiella compacta Carrion ex de Hoog (1977); Hormodendrum pedrosoi Brumpt (1922); Hormodendrum algeriense Montpell (1927); Hormodendrum rossicum Jacz. & Merlin (1929); Phialoconidiophora guggenheimia M. Moore & F. P. Almeida (1936); Fonsecaea pedrosoi var. communis Carrion (1940)

= Fonsecaea compacta =

Species of fungus

Fonsecaea compacta is a saprophytic fungal species found in the family Herpotrichiellaceae. It is a rare etiological agent of chromoblastomycosis, with low rates of correspondence observed from reports. The main active components of F. compacta are glycolipids, yet very little is known about its composition. F. compacta is widely regarded as a dysplastic variety of Fonsecaea pedrosoi, its morphological precursor. The genus Fonsecaea presently contains two species, F. pedrosoi and F. compacta. Over 100 strains of F. pedrosoi have been isolated but only two of F. compacta.

== History ==
Fonsecaea compacta was first proposed by Carrion in 1935. This proposal was considered invalid because a Latin diagnosis was not provided at the time. The name F. compacta was later validated in 1940 when Carrion provided the required Latin diagnosis. Carrion & Emmons reported the presence of phialides in F. compacta, which were described as being typical of those formed by Phialophora verrucosa. Owing to this observation, Redaelli & Ciferri transferred F. compacta to the genus Phialophora in 1942. Given that the generic name Fonsecaea is feminine, the species epithet "compacta" rather than "compactum" is used for gender agreement.

== Classification ==
There is some disagreement concerning the nomenclature, such as whether the genus Fonsecaea is suitable. This is largely due to discrepancy among medical mycologists as to which characteristics should be used to identify them. At one time or another, F. compacta had been placed in other genera, including, Phialophora, Hormodendrum, Acrotheca, Phialoconidiophora, Rhinocladiella or Trichosporium. The two more common ones are Rhinocladiella and Phialophora. Confusion surrounding F. pedrosoi and F. compacta has resulted from their polymorphic nature, in that they may form more than one type of conidia arrangement within a single culture. Evaluation of different isolates confirms the genus Fonsecaea is most logical, as characterized by their complex heads of conidia. In 2004, it was reported that based on sequences of the internal transcribed spacer (ITS) region, 39 strains of Fonsecaea spp. and related species could be classified into three groups: Group A, including F. pedrosoi and F. compacta; Group B, including F. monophora and Group C, a heterogeneous collection containing Fonsecaea sp. and Cladophialophora spp.

=== Taxonomic debate ===
The taxonomic status of F. compacta is uncertain. The debate whether or not F. compacta is a distinct species of Fonsecaea has persisted for years, essentially since it was discovered. Some authors maintain that F. compacta and F. pedrosoi are separate species given small differences in morphology of conidiophores and conidia. F. compacta and F. pedrosoi are readily distinguishable from each other. F. compacta is characterized by its compact conidial heads, blunt scars and subglobose to ovoid conidia, while F. pedrosoi has loose conidial heads, prominent scars, and elongated conidia. It was once thought that the two can not be combined into a single species considering there are base substitutions in 48 positions. The two were also found to have identical D1/D2 sequences, a 600 nucleotide domain in a subunit of rDNA. RAPD and RFLP methods were used to investigate genetic variations between these species, however no variations were found. In 2004, scientists from the University of Chiba in Japan found that there is no difference in subunit ribosomal DNA D1/D2 domain sequence between F. pedrosoi and F. compacta, which may indicate that the latter is merely a morphological variation of the first. More recently, several molecular investigations such as restriction fragment length polymorphism (RFLP) of mitochondrial DNA, ribosomal RNA (rRNA), ITS sequence, random amplified polymorphic DNA (RAPD), large subunit (LSU) rRNA D1/D2 domain sequence, and RFLP of small subunit (SSU) rRNA and ITS regions have revealed that F. pedrosoi and F. compacta have few distinctions at the molecular level. and accordingly F. compacta has been considered a morphological variant of F. pedrosoi.

== Growth and morphology ==
The morphological forms of F. compacta are referred to as RhinocIadiella-like, Cladosporium-Iike, and Phialophora-like. The Rhinocladiella-like and Phialophora-like types of development are best referred to as additional anamorphs of Fonsecaea. Some isolates of Fonsecaea may form phialides with collarettes that are typical of the genus Phialophora. When fungi produce more than one morphologic form in culture, such as the case with F. compacta and F. pedrosoi, the most stable, distinct, and unique form that is produced under standard conditions are used for identifying the fungus. Colonies on potato dextrose agar are slow growing, velvety to woolly, and olive to olivaceous black in color. Isolates of F. compacta may produce up to four different types of conidiophores. The diagnostic form consists of densely clustered, one-celled, pale brown, primary conidia, up to 4 × 8 μm that develop irregularly upon pegs at the terminus of erect, dark, irregularly swollen, club shaped, conidiophores. The primary conidia give rise to one-celled, 3 × 3.5 μm, secondary conidia in a like manner. The secondary conidia may in turn give rise to tertiary conidia. The conidia are rounded and form compact heads. Conidiophores bearing one-celled conidia like those produced by Rhinocladiella, branched chains of one-celled conidia arising from erect conidiophores like those produced by Cladosporium, and flask-shaped phialides having flared collarettes and balls of one-celled conidia like those produced by Phialophora may also be present. On average, sizes range from 5 to 20 μm in diameter.

== Habitat and ecology ==
F. compacta is predominantly found in humid conditions such as Latin America and Asia, although it has also been seen in Europe. A large number of cases have been reported from Madagascar in Africa, Brazil and Japan. Its natural habitat consists of soil and woody plant material. It is a saprotroph, commonly associated with forest litter decomposition.

== Disease in humans ==
Fonsecaea compacta has the ability to cause a disease called Chromoblastomycosis. The five main causal fungi of chromoblastomycosis are F. compacta, F. pedrosoi, Phialophora verrucosa, Exophiala dermatitidis and Cladophialophora carrionii. F. compacta is a rare etiological agent of chromoblastomycosis in humans, as it has only been reported in a few instances. A Puerto Rican case in which the disease was confined to an upper limb and the lesions consisted of extensive, diffuse, even areas of infiltration with some papillomata on the hand and without tumors or nodules was confirmed to be caused by F. compacta.

=== Epidemiology ===
Chromoblastomycosis is distributed worldwide, although it is more common in tropical and subtropical countries. Large numbers of cases have been reported from Madagascar in Africa, Brazil and Japan. Several studies have shown that it is prevalent in several other countries as well like Thailand, Korea, Pakistan. The five types of lesions described by Carrion in chromoblastomycosis are nodules, tumors, plaques, warty lesions. F. compacta is a very rare species, known only from a few clinical collections. A few of these instances include five cases in India from which F. compacta was isolated. One study of F. compacta in India produced an isolation rate of 15%. Another study from Sri Lanka reported isolation of 2 cases of F. compacta. Infection occurs more commonly in males than females, and typically between the ages of 30-50. It is less commonly seen in adolescence, with onset occurring before the age of 20 in 24% of cases.

=== Transmission ===
Infection caused by F. compacta is thought to be acquired through the same mechanisms as other more common agents of chromoblastomycosis, such as through puncture wounds caused by wooden splinters or thorny plants which allow the fungus to gain entry. Increased cases are seen in agricultural workers such as adult male farmers and laborers, whose occupation brings them into close contact with soil, are mainly affected. Poverty and malnutrition in Indian children may be responsible for the early development of clinical infection. The Fonsecaea species have been reported to be recoverable from environmental sources and therefore the disease is considered to be of traumatic origin. Nevertheless, the precise natural niche of both F. compacta has remained uncertain and hence it is unclear where and how symptomatic patients have acquired their infection.

=== Treatment ===
Good hygiene and adequate nutrition may help the individual abort a potential infection. Early stages of treatment for minor chromoblastomycosis cases involve surgical excision, electrodesiccation. cryosurgery, physical therapy, using liquid nitrogen for localized lesions is very effective and can be applied in combination with antifungal therapies. More advanced cases require systemic antifungals treatment for extended periods of time. Severe lesions tend to respond slowly or even become non-responding to antifungal drugs. Presently, the most useful antifungals against chromoblastomycosis include itraconazole and terbinafine, which are highly expensive and often used in combination. Cure rates observed with antifungal drugs vary from 15 to 80%. In severe forms cure rates are particularly low and relapse rates are high. F. compacta and F. pedrosoi are less susceptible to antifungal treatments so cure rates are lower compared to other agents of the disease.
