= Fonsecaea monophora =

Scientific classification
- Kingdom: Fungi
- Division: Ascomycota
- Class: Eurotiomycetes
- Order: Chaetothyriales
- Family: Herpotrichiellaceae
- Genus: Fonsecaea
- Species: F. monophora

Binomial name
- Fonsecaea monophora (Moore and de Almeida(1936)) de Hoog, Vicente, Attili (2004)

Type strain
- CBS 269.37, from a case of human chromoblastomycosis, S. America

Synonyms
- Botrytoides monophora Moore and de Almeida (1936)

Species of fungi

Fonsecaea monophora is a species of ascomycete fungi in the family Herpotrichiellaceae and is a causative agent of chromoblastomycosis. It is recognized by the World Health Organization as a neglected tropical disease.

F. monophora was described as a separate species from F. pedrosoi by de Hoog et al. in 2004.

Fonsecaea spp. are often recovered from environmental sources, including plants such as the babassu coconut. Disease caused by this fungus is usually of traumatic origin.

== Microbiology ==
The colony morphology is described as being restricted, spreading moderately, lanose to velvety, and the top being olivaceous to black with the reverse being black. The hyphae are septate and pale olivaceous. The conidiophores are erect, and can be either unbranched or branched, and are the same color as the hyphae or slightly darker. Conidiogenous cells are short-cylindrical, olivaceous, and arranged in loosely branched systems. The denticles have ellipsoidal, pale olivaceous conidia in short chains. Multi celled, sessile conidial chains similar to those found in the genus Cladophialophora can present.

Morphologically, Fonsecaea pedrosoi and Fonsecaea monophora are very similar. F. monophora typically have slightly longer conidial chains and slightly shorter denticles than F. pedrosoi. The two species cannot be distinguished physiologically, and sequencing of the internal transcribed spacer or D1/D2 region of ribosomal DNA is needed for identification. The absence of growth with inulin as sole carbon source, absence of fermentation, intolerance of 10% NaCl, tolerance of cycloheximide and absence of acid and extracellular DNAse production are traits shared by both species, as well as other melanized fungi belonging to the order Chaetothyriales.

In histopathology, a characteristic feature of chromoblastomycosis is the presence of Medlar bodies (also known as muriform cells), aggregations of spherical, pigmented fungal cells.

== Clinical Relevance ==
F. monophora is a causative agent of human chromoblastomycosis, and it is typically more opportunistic and neurotropic than F. pedrosoi. F. monophora has been isolated from brain abscesses, cervical lymph nodes, and bile, while F. pedrosoi appears to be associated strictly with chromoblastomycosis. Because of the similarities between the two species and the inability to distinguish them phenotypically, some cases attributed to F. pedrosoi may actually have been caused by F. monophora. Molecular methods are necessary for definite species identification.

The most common symptom experienced in CNS infection by F. monophora were headaches, which were typically accompanied by focal neurologic deficits and symptoms of increased intracranial pressure in several cases. In chromoblastomycosis, disease is usually characterized by polymorphic skin lesions and muriform cells in granulomatous and suppurative tissue.

For treatment, a combined approach with both early surgical intervention and combination treatment with antifungals vastly improves patient outcome. Therapy for F. monophora infection is challenging because there is no consensus regarding a treatment of choice. Outcomes are greatly variable and are dependent on the site of infection, lesion size, the etiological agent, and the patient's health status. In cases of chromoblastomycosis, F. monophora has been demonstrated to be sensitive to voriconazole, itraconazole, ketoconazole and terbinafine, but resistant to fluconazole and amphotericin B. Voriconazole has been used to successfully treat a case of CNS infection by F. monophora.

In a study involving 137 F. monophora isolates, the epidemiological cutoff values were; 2 μg/mL for itraconazole, 0.25 μg/mL for voriconazole and isavuconazole,1 μg/mL for posaconazole, and 0.5 μg/mL for terbinafine. Amphotericin B and flucytosine did not have epidemiological cutoff values set due to bimodal distribution.
