= Rhinocladiella aquaspersa =

Scientific classification
- Kingdom: Fungi
- Division: Ascomycota
- Class: Eurotiomycetes
- Order: Chaetothyriales
- Family: Herpotrichiellaceae
- Genus: Rhinocladiella
- Species: R. aquaspersa

Binomial name
- Rhinocladiella aquaspersa Schell et al., 1983

Species of fungi

Rhinocladiella aquaspersa is a species of fungus from the order Chaetothyriales. R. aquaspersa can cause a serious subcutaneous infection in humans known as chromoblastomycosis. The species was first described in 1983.

== Pathogenicity ==
R. aquaspersa is an rare cause of chromoblastomycosis, a chronic and subcutaneous mycosis characterized by slowly progressive granulomatous lesions. A hallmark of chromoblastomycosis is the formation of multicellular clusters of pigmented fungal cells known as medlar bodies, muriform cells, or sclerotic bodies.

== Clinical significance ==
Human infections due to R. aquaspersa are rare compared with those caused by other chromoblastomycosis agents such as Fonsecaea pedrosoi and Cladophialophora carrionii. Reported cases have originated primarily from the Americas.

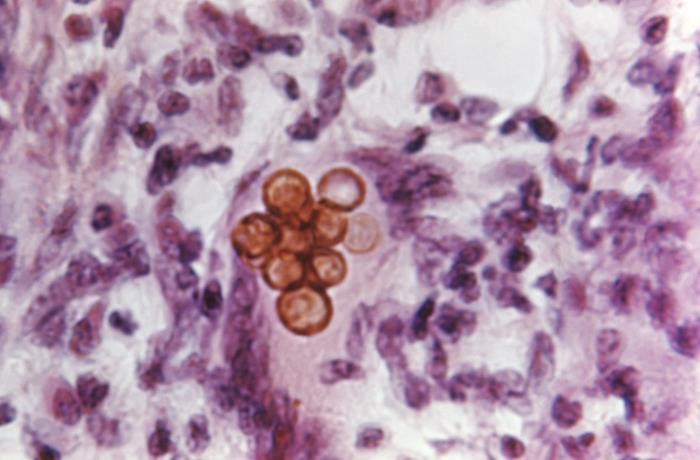
Characteristic sclerotic bodies seen in chromoblastomycosis

=== Diagnosis ===
Diagnosis is involves direct microscopic examination and histology. Histological examination commonly shows granulomatous inflammation containing clusters of pigmented fungal cells called sclerotic bodies, muriform cells, or medlar bodies. These fungal clusters are often pigmented due to fungal melanin and can resemble copper pennies.

Fungal culture and molecular assays can also aid in diagnostics.
