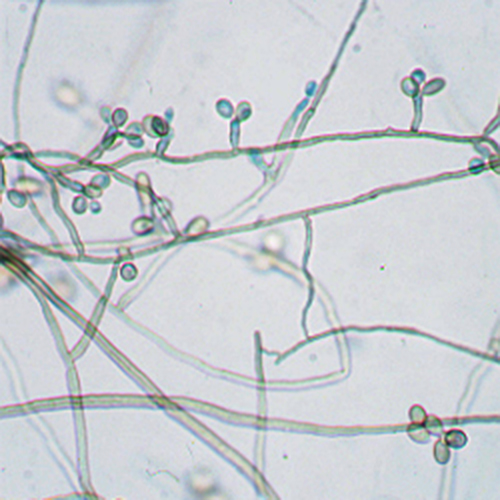

Scientific classification
- Kingdom: Fungi
- Division: Ascomycota
- Class: Eurotiomycetes
- Order: Chaetothyriales
- Family: Herpotrichiellaceae
- Genus: Rhinocladiella
- Species: R. mackenziei

Binomial name
- Rhinocladiella mackenziei (C.K.Campbell & Al-Hedaithy) Arzanlou & Crous (2007)

Synonyms
- Ramichloridium mackenziei C.K.Campb. & Al-Hedaithy (1993)

= Rhinocladiella mackenziei =

Species of fungus

Rhinocladiella mackenziei is a deeply pigmented ascomycete that is a common cause of human cerebral phaeohyphomycosis. Rhinocladiella mackenziei was believed to be endemic solely to the Middle East, due to the first cases of infection being limited to the region. However, cases of R. mackenziei infection are increasingly reported from regions outside the Middle East. This pathogen is unique in that the majority of infectious have been reported from seemingly healthy people.

== History ==
Rhinocladiella mackenziei was first identified in 1993 as Ramichloridium mackenziei by C.K. Campbell & Al-Hedaithy when it was identified as the cause of eight cases of human cerebral phaeohyphomycosis. All eight patients had brain abscess containing large amounts of pus. Campbell and Al-Hedaithy considered different genera for the un-named fungus, including Zasmidium, Leptodontidium, Ramichloridium, and Rhinocladiella. They elected to place it in the genus Ramichloridium based on morphological similarity. In previous publications, Naim-Ur-Rahman misidentified the fungus as an unknown species of Cladosporium, while Al-Hedaithy et al (1988) misidentified the fungus as Fonsecaea pedrosoi.

The genus Ramichloridium encompasses asexually propagating species that produce upright, darkly pigmented, apically elongating, zig-zag-shaped conidiophores that produce single-celled conidiospores. It was first described in 1937 by Stahel as containing the single species Ramichloridium musae but the genus was considered invalid as Stahel's publication lacked a Latin diagnosis. The genus Ramichloridium was re-introduced by de Hoog in 1977 typified by R. apiculatum.

Rhinocladiella mackenziei was known as Ramichloridium mackenziei until Arzanlou and coworkers explored the phylogeny of Ramichloridium and related genera through fungal DNA barcoding. The fungus was found to cluster in the Chaetothyriales clade along with Rhinocladiella species and was subsequently transferred to the genus Rhinocladiella. One of the main features that helped distinguish Ramichloridium and Rhinocladiella is the presence of Exophiala-like budding cells in Rhinocladiella, which were also seen in R. mackenziei. Additionally, the conidiophores of R. mackenziei are undifferentiated from the vegetative hyphae in contrast to those in Ramichloridium that are differentiated.

== Habitat and ecology ==
Rhinocladiella mackenziei is found in the hot and arid climates of temperate and tropical regions. It is considered endemic throughout the Middle East, specifically Saudi Arabia, Kuwait, and Qatar, and infections by this species have been observed in individuals from Afghanistan, Iran, and India. It is known less commonly to inhabit temperate and tropical regions. The environmental niche of R. mackenziei remains unknown. Another fungal brain pathogen; Cladophialophora bantiana, has been isolated in one occasion from sawdust, which could also be a possible source of R. mackenziei. Due to the lack of human knowledge about this organism, it has been difficult to isolate and culture R. mackenziei; and techniques such as the use of high temperatures, mouse vectors, and customized growth media are required.

Adding volatile aromatic hydrocarbons to culture media increases fungal growth, suggesting a possible natural association of this organism with terrestrial petroleum seeps.

== Morphology and reproduction ==
Rhinocladiella mackenziei is a black pignented fungus with holoblastic conidia (conidia that are produced by simple budding) that are broadly oval and more than 2μm wide. In vitro at 30 °C, R. mackenziei has smooth, pigmented, septate hyphae and narrower, pale brown aerial hyphae. Its conidiophores are undifferentiated or only slightly differentiated from vegetative hyphae, and produce brown, smooth-walled, oval conidia. Rhinocladiella mackenziei grows slowly in culture media. Colonies grown for a week at 30 °C on glucose peptone agar develop a dark grey-brown to black appearance with a black reverse, elevated center, and densely cottony texture. Rhinocladiella mackenziei grows poorly at 25 °C

This organism does not reproduce sexually in vitro.

== Disease in humans ==
Rhinocladiella mackenziei is highly neurotropic and one of the three main causative agents of cerebral phaeohyphomycosis. R. mackenziei is a unique pathogen capable of causing fatal infections in both seemingly healthy and immunocompromised persons. Infection by this agent is associated with extremely high mortality despite aggressive antifungal treatment and surgery. Symptoms may include headaches, fevers, neurological deficits, seizures, hemiparesis and even psychotic behavior. Infection is thought to result from exposure to spores through inhalation, ingestion or through skin lesions. Diagnosis of cerebral phaeohyphomycosis by R. mackenziei is confirmed by the microscopic observation of pigmented fungal elements in affected tissues combined with the identification of the pathogen by fungal DNA barcoding. Central nervous system colonization is thought to be secondary to spread through blood and lymph tissue. The basis for the affinity of R. mackenziei for brain tissue is completely unknown but has been hypothesized to involve specialized versions of the biological pigment melanin which act as virulence factors by allowing fungal cells to evade a human host's immune system and cross the blood–brain barrier. Melanin also protects the fungal cell wall from destruction by scavenging the hypochlorite produced by the immune system as well as helping to prevent antifungal drugs from entering the fungal pathogen.

== Treatment ==
Untreated cerebral phaeohyphomycosis caused by Rhinocladiella mackenziei has a mortality rate of nearly 100%, although some case reports exist of documented survival of patients. Rhinocladiella mackenziei has been shown to be resistant to Amphotericin B, an antifungal drug commonly used to treat fungal infections, both in vivo and in vitro. Susceptibility to triazoles such as itraconazole, posaconazole and isavuconazole has been seen in R. mackenziei, though a mixture of amphotericin B, itraconazole and 5-flucytosine has been associated with poor outcome in animal and clinical studies. Disease management typically involves multiple antifungal drugs, surgical debridement and immunotherapy.
