= Cladophialophora arxii =

Scientific classification
- Kingdom: Fungi
- Division: Ascomycota
- Class: Eurotiomycetes
- Order: Chaetothyriales
- Family: Herpotrichiellaceae
- Genus: Cladophialophora
- Species: C. arxii

Binomial name
- Cladophialophora arxii K. Tintelnot, P. von Hunnius, G.S. de Hoog, A. Polak-Wyss, E. Guého & F.Masclaux (1995)

Species of fungus

Cladophialophora arxii is a black yeast shaped dematiaceous fungus that is able to cause serious phaeohyphomycotic infections. C. arxii was first discovered in 1995 in Germany from a 22-year-old female patient suffering multiple granulomatous tracheal tumours. It is a clinical strain that is typically found in humans and is also capable of acting as an opportunistic fungus of other vertebrates Human cases caused by C. arxii have been reported from all parts of the world such as Germany and Australia.

The genus Cladophialophora comprises four different lineages, one of the main lineages belongs to the family of Herpotrichiellaceae. Within this lineage there are two major clades of the two one is called the bantiana clade in which C. arxii can be found. C.arxii is typically slow growing and is capable of growing at higher temperatures compared to other fungi with its maximal growth temperature reaching 42°.

== History and taxonomy ==
Cladophialophora arxii was first discovered in a tracheal granulomatous tumour of a 22-year-old female in Berlin, Germany in 1995. It was originally considered to be C. borelli due to the similarity in structural appearance to C. arxii. The fungus was considered to be of the genus Cladosporium. The genus Cladosporium was first discovered in 1816, several human pathogenic species belonging to Cladosporium are now classified as the genus Cladophialophora. The genus Cladophialophora mainly consists of species of melanized hyphomycetes that are found within human hosts. C. arxii within the genus Cladophialophora was named after Dr. J.A von Arx, a Dutch mycologist, for his efforts in classify the genus Cladosporium.

== Phylogeny ==
The genus Cladophialophora currently contains seven different species that are capable of causing disease in humans, C.arxii included. Cladophialophora consists of four different lineages: one lineage belonging to the family Herpotrichiellaceae and the other pertaining to a group of rock-dwelling strains. The majority of the human opportunistic fungi of Cladophialophora can be found within Herpotrichiellaceae which forms two major clades. The first clade, is known as the C. carrionii-clade and contains the species C. carrionii and C. boppii. The second clade, the C. bantiana clade includes the species C. bantiana, C. devriesii, C. mycetomatis, C. immunda, C. emmonsii, C. saturnica and C. arxii. It has been found that the environmental strain C. minourae is a sister strain to C. arxii

== Habitat ==
Cladophialophora is a genus of black yeast fungi whose natural habitat consists of soil and rotting plant material. Several of the species pertaining to the Cladophialophora have been reported in both tropical and subtropical regions of the world. Cladophialophora arxii is a clinical strain that has generally been found in humans C. arxii is also capable of acting as an opportunistic fungus of other vertebrates.

== Growth and morphology ==
C. arxii is a slow growing fungus that grows to about 36–40 mm in size when cultured on a growth medium of SDA agar and PDA agar at 25 °C over a span of 35 days. The colonies formed contained dark grey aerial hyphae and black-brown coloured hyphae located on the margins of the SDA agar. On the PDA the colonies were dark black-brown with felty radial furrows. The fungus contained olive brown septated hyphae with both lateral and terminal acropetal conidial chains with branching. The overall morphology of the conidia of C.arxii are very similar to Cladophialophora devriesii the conidial chains of C.arxii are longer. Additionally, the conidial chains are fragile and borne on denticles. The conidia of C.arxii are pale brown, smooth, thick walled with a lemon-spindle shaped morphology. Initially the fungus contained muriform cells from tissue samples but following corticosteroid therapy the cells changed their shape and become irregularly shaped hyphae.

== Physiology ==
The optimal growth temperature of the Cladophialophora species is from 27 to 30 °C but are capable of growing anywhere between 9-37 °C. C. arxii grows optimally at 37 °C with the maximum temperature it can grow at being 42 °C. C. arxii has an optimal production of non-septate swollen cells at a pH of 4–5. C. arxii is meso-erythritol and galactitol assimilated but is unable to assimilate on ethanol. Furthermore, it is not able to assimilate methyl-alpha-glucoside, soluble starch, glycerol, meso-erythritol, myoinositol or succinate.

== Clinical relevance ==
Is a dematiaceous fungus that causes severe phaeohyphomycotic infections. It is fungus that is rarely seen, was the cause of granulomatous tumours in the trachea of the first patient that was diagnosed with this fungus in 1995. The fungus was treated with 5-FC, amphotericin B, and itraconazole.C. arxii was assumed to be the cause of subcutaneous phaeohyphomycosis of an ulcer in a 68-year-old woman, however, these results were not definitive Shortly after in 2001, it was believed that C. arxii was responsible for causing both cerebral and lung phaeohyphomycosis in a 30-year-old African women following a heart transplant. Additionally, it was the cause of femoral osteomyelitis in a 20-year-old man. Treatment of the osteomyelitis included surgical debridement, itraconazole, and interferon gamma treatment. Finally, the most recently reported case of C. arxii was seen in Australia with the patient suffering from a pulmonary chromoblastomycosis.

== Treatment ==
Several anti fungal drugs have been shown to be successful in treating C. arxii such 5-FC, amphotericin B, itraconazole, and interferon gamma treatment. Additionally, most of these antifungal drugs are usually accompanied by surgical procedures such as surgical debridement. Furthermore, in vitro studies have shown that combination therapy with amphotericin B and terbinafine have synergistic effects against C. arxii. 5-FC and itraconazole have also shown synergistic effects when targeting infections caused by C. arxii.
