= Capronia cogtii =

Scientific classification
- Domain: Eukaryota
- Kingdom: Fungi
- Division: Ascomycota
- Class: Eurotiomycetes
- Order: Chaetothyriales
- Family: Herpotrichiellaceae
- Genus: Capronia
- Species: C. cogtii

Binomial name
- Capronia cogtii Zhurb. (2019)

Species of fungus

Capronia cogtii is a rare species of lichenicolous (lichen-dwelling) fungus in the family Herpotrichiellaceae. Found in northern Mongolia, it was described as a new species in 2019.

== Taxonomy ==
Capronia cogtii belongs to the fungal family Herpotrichiellaceae and is characterized by its hyaline ascospores, which distinguish it from most other Capronia species that have pigmented ascospores. The new species is most similar to C. amylacea, C. hypotrachynae, C. normandinae, and C. pseudonormandinae, but can be distinguished by its smaller ascomata, longer hyaline ascospores, and different host genus, Vahliella (Vahliellaceae), compared to Peltigera (Peltigeraceae). The species epithet cogtii was given in honor of the late Professor Ulzii Cogt, who was a prominent figure in Mongolian lichenology.

== Description ==
The vegetative hyphae of Capronia cogtii are pale brown, 2–3.5 μm wide, septate, and ramify from the lower parts of the exciple. The ascomata are perithecial, blackish, more or less glossy, roughly spherical to ovoid, and occasionally shortly papillate at the apex. They are setose above, ostiolate, 90–150 μm in diameter, and have a rough surface. The setae are dark brown, straight, not branched, 15–60 μm tall, 4–5 μm wide at base, and arise from a discrete dark foot-cell. The exciple is made of medium to dark brown pseudoparenchymatous cells outwardly, and somewhat hyaline, strongly elongated, radially compressed cells inwardly. The periphyses are hyaline, measure 10–20 by 2–3 μm, septate, and are not branched. The ascospores are hyaline, clavate to very narrowly obovoid, and typically have 3 transverse septa (sometimes as few as 1 or as many or 5). They are usually constricted at the septa, smooth-walled, and overlappingly crowded in the ascus.

== Habitat and distribution ==
Capronia cogtii is known only from the holotype, which was collected on the thallus of Vahliella leucophaea and occasionally on adjacent decaying mosses in sparse Larix sibirica mountain forest in northern Mongolia. The host lichen, Vahliella leucophaea, is morphologically similar to some species of Pannariaceae and has long been placed in this family. This is the first species of Capronia known to grow on members of Vahliellaceae. Two Capronia species are known to grow on Pannariaceae hosts, C. magellanica, growing on species of Fuscopannaria, and C. paranectrioides, growing on species of Erioderma. Capronia cogtii is also similar to C. andina and C. solitaria but can be distinguished by its hyaline ascospores and larger ascomata, respectively.
