= Capronia harrisiana =

Scientific classification
- Domain: Eukaryota
- Kingdom: Fungi
- Division: Ascomycota
- Class: Eurotiomycetes
- Order: Chaetothyriales
- Family: Herpotrichiellaceae
- Genus: Capronia
- Species: C. harrisiana

Binomial name
- Capronia harrisiana Hollinger & Lendemer (2021)

Species of lichen

Capronia harrisiana is a lichenicolous fungus on the tripartite foliose lichen Crocodia aurata. Although the host species is widespread in many areas of the world, no species of Capronia has previously been reported from Crocodia aurata, and Capronia harrisiana appears to be endemic to the southern Appalachian Mountains in southeastern North America. The new species is characterized by 50–120 μm wide ascomata, 40–95 μm long setae, (1–)3-septate, pale brown, 11.9–15.7 × 4.4–5.8 μm ascospores, and an I+ red hymenium.
