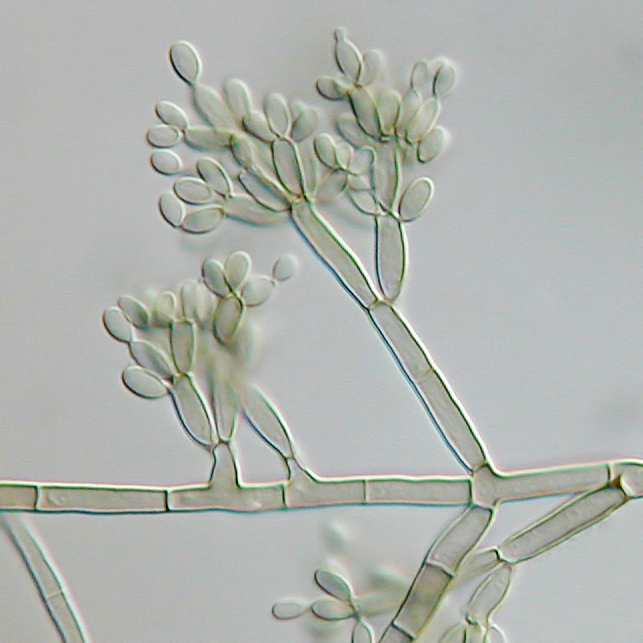
- Conidiophores of Fonsecaea pedrosoi

Scientific classification
- Domain: Eukaryota
- Kingdom: Fungi
- Division: Ascomycota
- Class: Eurotiomycetes
- Order: Chaetothyriales
- Family: Herpotrichiellaceae
- Genus: Fonsecaea

Type species
- Fonsecaea pedrosoi (Brumpt) Negroni (1936)

Species
- F. brasiliensis F. compacta F. monophora F. multimorphosa F. nubica F. pedrosoi

= Fonsecaea =

Genus of fungi

Fonsecaea is a genus of fungi in the family Herpotrichiellaceae. The type species, Fonsecaea pedrosoi, is associated with the disease chromoblastomycosis.
