= Capronia mansonii =

Scientific classification
- Kingdom: Fungi
- Division: Ascomycota
- Class: Eurotiomycetes
- Order: Chaetothyriales
- Family: Herpotrichiellaceae
- Genus: Capronia
- Species: C. mansonii

Binomial name
- Capronia mansonii (Schol-Schwarz) E.Müll., Petrini, P.J.Fisher, Samuels & Rossman (1987)

Synonyms
- Dictyotrichieila mansonii Schol-Schwarz (1968); Berlesiella mansonii (Schol-Schwarz) Lar.N.Vassiljeva (1998)

Species of fungus

Capronia mansonii is a mesophilic black yeast that is a part of the Herpotrichiellaceae. The species is uncommon in nature but is saprotrophic in nature and been discovered on decaying plant matter, particularly wood. This fungus is naturally found in the Netherlands and has successfully been cultured in lab. It is a teleomorph of the ascomycota division and possesses brown spores.

== History and taxonomy ==
Capronia mansonii is a type of black yeast that was first discovered from an isolated strain in 1968. The fungus was originally described from a strain in vitro found in Norway by Marie Beatrice Schol-Schwarz on an aspen tree, and it has not yet been described in situ. This fungus was the first species in Herpotrichiellaceae discovered to create ascomata in an isolated culture. It is one of the only five species out of thirty Capronia species that has successfully produced ascomata in vitro. The basionym for this species is Dictyotrichiella mansonii. Its anamorph is thought to be Exophiala mansonii but uncertainty and discourse remains. The original anamorph was first thought to be Rhinocladiella atrovirens and then Exophiala castellanii An analysis of rRNA gene sequences concluded that C. mansonii is the same biological species as E. castellanii. Capronia mansonii is often misidentified as its sister species Capronia munkii but can be differentiated by its larger and thicker cell walls and more frequent ascospores that transversely septate. It is also differentiated from its anamorph because it lacks conidia, slimy colonies, and aerial hyphae.

== Growth and morphology ==
This fungus is a teleomorph or sexual form that is formed in vitro. This species has yet to be described in situ. The fungus is thought to be closely related to Exophiala dermatitidis, and is often hypothesized in literature to be the teleomorph of E. dermatitidis. The fungus is a part of the ascomycota phylum, also commonly defined as sac fungi. This phylum is often defined by its possession of asci, a microscope sexual structure that produces non-motile spores called ascospores. The asci of C. mansonii produce 8 ascospores upon germination. These ascospores begin with a glassy transparent appearance and then progress to a more grey-yellow, olive, and finally brown colour. These ascospores have 4–5 transverse thick-walled septa and 1 incomplete longitudinal septum. The spores have been described in literature as not tight at the septa. Juvenile asci have thicker, longer, and more lightly coloured ascus walls, whereas fully matured asci form thinner dark brown walls that are filled with ascospores. The ascomatal wall itself can range from a brown-yellow to a light brown colour which is commonly seen in other black yeasts.

== Physiology and reproduction ==
This mesophilic fungus has been successfully cultured by Untereiner at room temperature ranging from 20–25 °C. C. mansonii has also been observed in a yeast budding form. This fungus has a homothallic breeding system indicating that it does not need a partner to sexually reproduce. The ascospores of this fungus have been described to germinate within 12 hours on Oatmeal Agar. They appear slimy and resemble yeast within 48 hours, reaching full maturity at 16 weeks. The ascomata that have been grown in lab have been shown to fully mature and develop septae but are unable to produce asci and ascospores. Artificial daylight is thought to be the limiting factor that prevents the production of asci. Further replications of the above experiments revealed that the structure formed may actually be a pseudothecium, an ascocarp that resembles a ascocarp but whose asci do not organize into a hymenium. The pseudothecia grew in abundance and also failed to produce ascospores.

== Habitat and ecology ==
Members of the Capronia family are described as saprotrophic meaning they get their nutrients from decaying matter. Strains of this fungus have been found on various plant hosts, particularly on their leaves. They are regularly found on other decaying ascomycota and basidiomycota in the Netherlands, particularly on the wood of Populus tremula. The holotype was discovered on the stems of a Lupinus polyphyllus by Schol-Schwarz in 1968. This fungus has occasionally been found on fresh sausages consisting of pork, beef, or mixed meats. They remain unstable on meat and are unable to persist for more than three days in the presence of other lactic acid bacteria.
