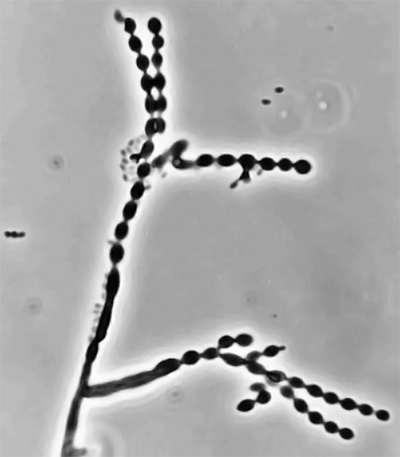

Scientific classification
- Kingdom: Fungi
- Division: Ascomycota
- Class: Eurotiomycetes
- Order: Chaetothyriales
- Family: Herpotrichiellaceae
- Genus: Cladophialophora
- Species: C. carrionii

Binomial name
- Cladophialophora carrionii (Trejos) de Hoog, Kwon-Chung & McGinnis (1995)

Synonyms
- Cladosporium carrionii Trejos (1954); Cladophialophora ajelloi Borelli (1980)

= Cladophialophora carrionii =

Species of fungus

Cladophialophora carrionii is a melanized fungus in the genus Cladophialophora that is associated with decaying plant material like cacti and wood. It is one of the most frequent species of Cladophialophora implicated in human disease. Cladophialophora carrionii is a causative agent of chromoblastomycosis, a subcutaneous infection that occurs in sub-tropical areas such as Madagascar, Australia and northwestern Venezuela. Transmission occurs through traumatic implantation of plant material colonized by C. carrionii, mainly infecting rural workers. When C. carrionii infects its host, it transforms from a mycelial state to a muriform state to better tolerate the extreme conditions in the host's body.

== Habitat and ecology ==
Infections by C. carrionii typically arise following traumatic inoculation of material colonized by the fungus. Most infections are reported from dry rural agricultural regions. Cladophialophora carrionii is saprotrophic, occurring mainly on decaying plant material such as wood where it produces enzymes that allow it to utilize lignin as a nutrient source. Cladophialophora carrionii is also found in pine trees, eucalyptus fence posts (which are often used in farming to protect crops), soil and dead cactus spines where it derives its nutrition from carbohydrates, minerals and vitamins in the plant tissue.

== Morphology ==
Cladophialophora carrionii is part of a group of melanized fungi, also known as "black yeasts", because its mycelial form has a dark green colour and its conidia have brown pigment. Colonies grow at a modest rate on Sabouraud dextrose agar. The conidia of C. carrionii are unicellular oval-shaped spores that are distinguishable due to the presence of two lightly pigmented scars. Conidia vary in length (1.5-3.0 × 2.0-7.5 μm). Its long conidiophores are similar to the genus Cladosporium, which comes from the Latin word "clado", meaning branched. The genus Cladophialophora is distinguished from Cladosporium because in addition to chains of conidia, members of the genus Cladophialophora also produce phialides. Cladophialophora carrionii is a dimorphic pathogen that changes states from a mycelial form to a muriform, yeast-like state once it invades its host. Muriform cells are golden-brown in colour due to melanin deposition and have thick cell walls.

== Growth and reproduction ==
Like many other black yeasts, C. carrionii is sensitive to temperatures above 37 °C. It can be distinguished in culture by the presence of its urease enzyme hydrolyzing urea and its inability to liquefy gelatin. Altering temperatures or micronutrient levels such as calcium and phosphate affects whether C. carrionii is in the mycelial or muriform state. The fungus transforms to muriform cells under conditions of temperature between 25 °C to 37 °C, 0.1 mM Ca^{2+}, and a pH of 2.5. It produces multiple conidia in long, straight chains that bud off the hyphae, with the youngest conidia farthest from the hyphae. There is no sexual state known for C. carrionii.

== Disease in humans ==
Cladophialophora carrionii can cause a disease called chromoblastomycosis in individuals with a normal functioning immune system, unlike many other pathogenic fungi that can only cause disease in immunocompromised individuals. It is one of the most common agents of chromoblastomycosis. The fungus changes states once it invades the animal host from the mycelial state to muriform cells that spread outward radially. This dimorphism has been suggested to increase the tolerance of C. carrionii to extreme conditions, such as the high temperature and acidity in the human body. Muriform cells increase cell number by septum formation within the hyphae, rather than by budding.

Chromoblastomycosis results in subcutaneous, crusty lesions that can spread over large areas on different parts of the body such as the legs, arms and face. If not treated, the lesions continue to increase in size over the body, but do not usually pose a risk of mortality. As the lesions grow, they can take on multiple forms that resemble nodes, tumours (resemble cauliflowers), and plaques. Infection causes inflammation of the leg or foot tissue, resulting in granulomas.

=== Epidemiology ===
Chromoblastomycosis is found worldwide, most prominently in tropical and sub-tropical regions such as Mexico, Madagascar, Brazil, China, and Malaysia but some cases have been reported in the United States and Europe. Cladophialophora carrionii causes only a minor subset of chromoblastomycosis cases, most notably in drier locations such as Madagascar, Australia and northwestern Venezuela, which are rife with plants inhabited by the fungus. Many cases of chromoblastomycosis cases target males over the age of thirty because they are predominant in the agricultural industry in rural areas, where deforestation must be carried out to provide agricultural land and they directly work with the plants that are commonly colonized by C. carrionii.

=== Pathogenesis and treatment ===
Chromoblastomycosis infection occurs by subcutaneous puncture by a thorn or splinter that is infected with C. carrionii, such as decaying cacti and wood. Scratching at the lesions worsens the infection by spreading the fungus over larger and distal areas of the body. Field workers who work without foot protection or clothing covering legs and arms are at greater risk for inoculation by material colonized by C. carrionii. Immunocompromised individuals are also at risk, because the ability to produce antibodies against fungal proteins is critical in minimizing fungal pathogenicity and C. carrionii may penetrate deeper into muscle and bone layers if the patient is immunosuppressed. Even if an individual is immunocompetent, they may be at risk if they carry the HLA-A29 antigen, since its presence may increase an individual's susceptibility to contracting chromoblastomycosis. Histology tests from a skin biopsy can identify muriform cells that are commonly found in chromoblastomycosis. Identifying the specific agent that caused chromoblastomycosis can be done by PCR assays or culturing the fungus by growing it on an agar plate and observing the colony morphology and sporulation characteristics. However, C. carrionii grows quite slowly in culture, so significant results cannot be obtained until after 4–6 weeks of incubation.

During infection, the immune system of the host attempts to eliminate the fungus via engulfment and degradation by macrophages and neutrophils, which function in the innate immune system. The adaptive immune system also plays a role by activating cells such as interleukin-6 (IL-6), the type of IL specifically produced with C. carrionii infection, but it may have negative consequences for eradicating the fungus. It is postulated that the presence of melanin in black yeasts like C. carrionii contributes to pathogenicity because it strengthens the fungal cell wall and can neutralize the enzymes produced in macrophages that normally function to break down targeted cells.

Minor cases of chromoblastomycosis can be resolved by surgery or antifungal medications. Cold therapy (cryosurgery) by applying cool liquid nitrogen onto lesions can be effective if combined with antifungal therapy and chemotherapy. More serious cases must be treated for a prolonged period of time (6 to 12 months) with the antifungals itraconazole and terbinafine. Antifungals have a wide range of effectiveness, curing between 15-80% of cases. However, C. carrionii is sensitive to commonly used antifungals so cure rates are higher than seen in chromoblastomycosis infections caused by Fonsecaea pedrosoi. Treatments less effective if the infection is chronic, resulting in high relapse rates.

== Etymology ==
The term Cladophialophora is derived from the Greek words klados (branch) and phiala (flask or bottle) and the suffix phora, which means bearing or carrying, emphasizing that these structures produce and harbor the fungal spores. The specific epithet carrionii is in honor of the charismatic Puerto Rican mycologist Prof. Dr. Arturo I. Carrión, renowned for his contributions to medical mycology, particularly in the taxonomy and clinical understanding of dematiaceous fungal pathogens. Therefore, the full name Cladophialophora carrionii means a black flask-shaped fungus with branched conidia chains, named in honor of Dr. Carrión.
