= Phialophora cinerescens =

Scientific classification
- Kingdom: Fungi
- Division: Ascomycota
- Class: Eurotiomycetes
- Order: Chaetothyriales
- Family: Herpotrichiellaceae
- Genus: Phialophora
- Species: P. cinerescens

Binomial name
- Phialophora cinerescens (Wollenw.) J.F.H.Beyma (1940)

Synonyms
- Verticillium cinerescens Wollenw. [as 'cinerascens'] (1930)

Species of fungus

Phialophora cinerescens is an ascomycete fungus that is a plant pathogen infecting carnations.
