= Rhinocladiella basitona =

Scientific classification
- Kingdom: Fungi
- Division: Ascomycota
- Class: Eurotiomycetes
- Order: Chaetothyriales
- Family: Herpotrichiellaceae
- Genus: Rhinocladiella
- Species: R. basitona

Binomial name
- Rhinocladiella basitona Arzanlou et al., 2007

Species of fungi

Rhinocladiella basitona is a species of fungi from the genus Rhinocladiella. This yeast-like fungus belongs to a group of fungi known as dematiaceous molds, which are characterized by dark pigmentation due to melanin production. R. basitona is an infrequent cause of infections in humans. A case of subcutaneous infection, known as phaeohyphomycosis, has been reported in an immunocompetent individual. R. basitona has also been implicated in endophthalmitis following traumatic inoculation.
