= Phialophora asteris =

Scientific classification
- Kingdom: Fungi
- Division: Ascomycota
- Class: Eurotiomycetes
- Order: Chaetothyriales
- Family: Herpotrichiellaceae
- Genus: Phialophora
- Species: P. asteris

Binomial name
- Phialophora asteris (Dowson) Burge & I.Isaac (1974)

Synonyms
- Cephalosporium asteris Dowson (1923)

Species of fungus

Phialophora asteris is an ascomycete fungus that is a plant pathogen infecting sunflowers.
