= Capronia suijae =

Scientific classification
- Kingdom: Fungi
- Division: Ascomycota
- Class: Eurotiomycetes
- Order: Chaetothyriales
- Family: Herpotrichiellaceae
- Genus: Capronia
- Species: C. suijae

Binomial name
- Capronia suijae Tsurykau & Etayo (2017)
- Holotype: Ostrozhanka Village, Belarus

Species of lichen

Capronia suijae is a little-known species of lichenicolous (lichen-dwelling) fungus in the family Herpotrichiellaceae. Found in Belarus, it was formally described as a new species in 2017 by Andrei Tsurykau and Javier Etayo. The type specimen was found growing on the thallus of the bark-dwelling, crustose lichen Xanthoria parietina. Capronia suijae is only known to occur at its original collection location.

== Taxonomy ==
Capronia suijae is a lichen-dwelling member of the family Herpotrichiellaceae (class Eurotiomycetes). It was introduced in 2017 from material growing on the common yellow lichen Xanthoria parietina collected in the Gomel region of Belarus (Ostrozhanka Village). The species is recognised by its very small, setose perithecia (40–80 μm in diameter) and by the colourless to pale-brown ascospores, usually with three or fewer cross-walls, measuring about 9.5–11.5 × 4–5 μm. The species epithet suijae honours the Estonian lichenologist Ave Suija, "in recognition of her important contribution to the knowledge of lichenicolous fungi".

== Description ==
The fungus grows immersed inside the host thallus as flexuous, septate brown hyphae 1.5–4 μm wide. Its fruit bodies are perithecioid (flask-shaped) and initially half-buried in the lichen before becoming almost superficial; they are spherical or nearly so, black, and densely bristled with dark, unbranched setae (spines) 20–38 × 2–3 μm. The perithecial wall consists of thick-walled angular cells, and the internal tissue (hamathecium) is gelatinised and lacks pseudoparaphyses.

Asci are club-shaped, bitunicate (having a double wall) and eight-spored, 28.5–38 × 6–11.5 μm. The ascospores are ellipsoid to fusiform with obtuse ends; they start hyaline and turn pale brown, have 0–3 transverse septa, are often constricted at the septa, and typically measure 9.9–11.2 × 4.2–4.6 μm. No longitudinal septa are formed, but each cell may contain an oil droplet. Asexual structures are unknown.

== Habitat and distribution ==
Capronia suijae has been recorded only from its type locality in south-eastern Belarus, where it develops on the darkened lobes of healthy-looking, bark-dwelling Xanthoria parietina. The lesions were also colonised by Muellerella lichenicola, so the pathogenicity of C. suijae towards its host remains unconfirmed.
