= Pleomelogramma =

Scientific classification
- Kingdom: Fungi
- Division: Ascomycota
- Class: Eurotiomycetes
- Order: Chaetothyriales
- Family: Herpotrichiellaceae
- Genus: Pleomelogramma; Speg.

Type species
- Pleomelogramma argentinense Speg.

Species
- P. argentinensis P. rugosa

Genus of fungi

Pleomelogramma is a genus of fungi in the family Herpotrichiellaceae; according to the 2007 Outline of Ascomycota, the placement in this family is uncertain.
