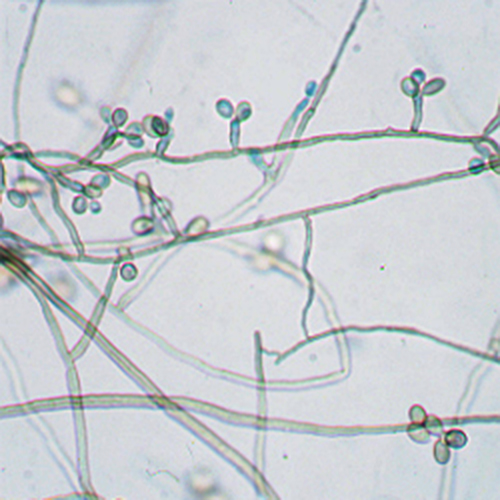
- Rhinocladiella mackenziei

Scientific classification
- Kingdom: Fungi
- Division: Ascomycota
- Class: Eurotiomycetes
- Order: Chaetothyriales
- Family: Herpotrichiellaceae
- Genus: Rhinocladiella; Nannf. (1934)

Type species
- Rhinocladiella atrovirens Nannf. (1934)

Synonyms
- Ardhachandra Subram. & Sudha (1978); Carrionia Bric.-Irag., Rev.Clin.Luiz Razetti (1938); Hormodendroides M.Moore & F.P.Almeida (1937); Phialoconidiophora M.Moore & F.P.Almeida (1937); Racodium Pers. (1794); Rhacodiopsis Donk (1975)

= Rhinocladiella =

Genus of fungi

Rhinocladiella is a genus of yeast-like fungi in the family Herpotrichiellaceae. It has 17 species. The genus was circumscribed by Swedish botanist John Axel Nannfeldt in 1934 with R. atrovirens as the type species. Two species (R. aquaspersa and R. mackenziei) are known to cause severe infections in humans.

== Species ==
- Rhinocladiella amoena Hern.-Restr., Madrid, Gené, Cano & Guarro (2016)
- Rhinocladiella aquaspersa (Borelli) Schell, McGinnis & Borelli (1983)
- Rhinocladiella atrovirens Nannf. (1934)
- Rhinocladiella basitona (de Hoog) Arzanlou & Crous (2007)
- Rhinocladiella compacta (Carrión) Schol-Schwarz (1968)
- Rhinocladiella coryli Crous & R.K.Schumach. (2016)
- Rhinocladiella cristaspora Matsush. (1971)
- Rhinocladiella fasciculata (V.Rao & de Hoog) Arzanlou & Crous (2007)
- Rhinocladiella indica S.C.Agarwal (1969)
- Rhinocladiella mackenziei (C.K.Campb. & Al-Hedaithy) Arzanlou & Crous (2007)
- Rhinocladiella phaeophora Veerkamp & W.Gams (1983) – Colombia
- Rhinocladiella pyriformis Pagano & Zucconi (1995)
- Rhinocladiella quercus Crous & R.K.Schumach. (2016)
- Rhinocladiella selenoides (de Hoog) Onofri & Castagn. (1983)
- Rhinocladiella similis de Hoog & Calig. (2003)
- Rhinocladiella tibetensis Y.M.Wu & T.Y.Zhang (2013) – China
- Rhinocladiella vesiculosa Kamyschko (1960)
