= Medlar bodies =

Pathologic finding in chromoblastomycosis

Medlar bodies, also known as sclerotic or muriform cells, are thick-walled cells (5–12 microns) with multiple internal transverse septa or chambers that resemble copper pennies. When present in skin or subcutaneous tissue, the cells are indicative of chromoblastomycosis.
