= Veronaea =

Scientific classification
- Kingdom: Fungi
- Division: Ascomycota
- Class: Eurotiomycetes
- Order: Chaetothyriales
- Family: Herpotrichiellaceae
- Genus: Veronaea; Cif. & Montemartini.

Type species
- Veronaea botryosa Cif. & Montemartini.

Genus of fungi

Veronaea is a genus of ascomycete fungi, classified in the family Herpotrichiellaceae. The genus was defined by R. Ciferri and A. Montemartini in 1958.

Species of Veronaea grow relatively well in culture, producing sparingly branched, brownish conidiophores with geniculate, sympodial conidiogenous cells with flat, unthickened scars, each producing single 1–septate conidia. The cosmopolitan V. botryosa has 2(–4) celled conidia and although found in soil and other organic matter, it frequently causes skin infections in immunocompromised humans.
