= Capronia normandinae =

Scientific classification
- Kingdom: Fungi
- Division: Ascomycota
- Class: Eurotiomycetes
- Order: Chaetothyriales
- Family: Herpotrichiellaceae
- Genus: Capronia
- Species: C. normandinae

Binomial name
- Capronia normandinae R.Sant. & D.Hawksw. (1990)

Species of lichen

Capronia normandinae is a species of lichenicolous (lichen-dwelling) fungus in the family Herpotrichiellaceae. The fungus was first formally described in 1990 by Rolf Santesson and David Hawksworth. The fungus has been recorded from Papua New Guinea, the Atlantic Ocean (Portugal, Madeira), Australasia (New Zealand), Europe (France, Ireland, Norway, Portugal, Spain, UK), and South America (Argentina, Chile, Colombia, Ecuador). The fungus parasitises the host lichen Normandina pulchella, after which it is named.

A characteristic feature of Capronia normandinae is the black, hair-like structures on its surface called setose perithecia. The fungus produces light olive-brown ascospores typically measuring 15–21 by 7.5–9.0 μm. These spores look like they have many internal divisions because they contain tiny fat droplets (guttules) and special cell walls (distosepta). Around the fungus's opening (the ostiole), there are simple (unbranched), unsegmented hair-like growths (setae).
