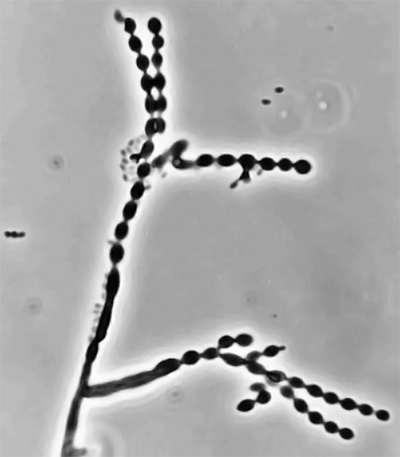
- Cladophialophora carrionii

Scientific classification
- Domain: Eukaryota
- Kingdom: Fungi
- Division: Ascomycota
- Class: Eurotiomycetes
- Order: Chaetothyriales
- Family: Herpotrichiellaceae
- Genus: Cladophialophora; Borelli (1980)

Type species
- Cladophialophora ajelloi Borelli (1980)

= Cladophialophora =

Genus of fungi

Cladophialophora is a genus of fungi in the family Herpotrichiellaceae. It has 35 species. The genus contains black yeast-like fungi, some of which are species of important medical significance. Cladophialophora bantiana causes the rare brain disease cerebral phaeohyphomycosis. Cladophialophora carrionii is a common cause of chromoblastomycosis in semi-arid climates. Some of the species are endophytes–associating with plants. For example, Cladophialophora yegresii is a cactus endophyte, which is sometimes introduced into humans via cactus spines.

== Taxonomy ==
The genus was proposed in 1980 by Italian-born Venezuelan microbiologist and mycologist Dante Borelli. The type species was assigned to Cladophialophora ajelloi, which was isolated from a Ugandan case of chromomycosis.

== Species ==
- Cladophialophora abundans P.Feng, V.A.Vicente, Najafz., van den Ende, Stielow, Badali, Boeger & de Hoog (2013)
- Cladophialophora arxii Tintelnot (1995)
- Cladophialophora australiensis Crous & A.D.Hocking (2007)
- Cladophialophora bantiana (Sacc.) de Hoog, Kwon-Chung & McGinnis (1995)
- Cladophialophora boppii (Borelli) de Hoog, Kwon-Chung & McGinnis (1995)
- Cladophialophora cabanerensis Maciá-Vicente (2020)
- Cladophialophora carrionii (Trejos) de Hoog, Kwon-Chung & McGinnis (1995)
- Cladophialophora chaetospira (Grove) Crous & Arzanlou (2007)
- Cladophialophora cladoniae (Diederich) Diederich (2012)
- Cladophialophora devriesii (A.A.Padhye & Ajello) de Hoog, Kwon-Chung & McGinnis (1995)
- Cladophialophora emmonsii (A.A.Padhye, McGinnis & Ajello) de Hoog & A.A.Padhye (1999)
- Cladophialophora eucalypti Crous & Carnegie (2019)
- Cladophialophora exuberans M.M.F.Nascim., V.A.Vicente & de Hoog (2017)
- Cladophialophora floridana Obase, Douhan, Yos.Matsuda & M.E.Sm. (2015)
- Cladophialophora hawksworthii (Etayo & Diederich) Diederich (2012)
- Cladophialophora hostae Crous, U.Braun & H.D.Shin (2007)
- Cladophialophora humicola Crous & U.Braun (2007)
- Cladophialophora immunda Badali, M.M.Satow, Prenaf.-Boldú & de Hoog (2008)
- Cladophialophora matsushimae Koukol (2010)
- Cladophialophora megalosporae Diederich (2012)
- Cladophialophora minutissima M.L.Davey & Currah (2007)
- Cladophialophora modesta McGinnis, de Hoog & Haase (1999)
- Cladophialophora multiseptata Madrid, Cano, Najafz., de Hoog, Silvera & Crous (2013)
- Cladophialophora mycetomatis Badali, de Hoog & Bonifaz (2008)
- Cladophialophora normandinae (Diederich & Etayo) Diederich (2012)
- Cladophialophora parmeliae (Etayo & Diederich) Diederich & Unter. (2012)
- Cladophialophora potulentorum Crous & A.D.Hocking (2007)
- Cladophialophora psammophila Badali, Prenaf.-Boldú, Guarro & de Hoog (2011)
- Cladophialophora pseudocarrionii Madrid, Hern.-Restr., Gené, Cano & Guarro (2016)
- Cladophialophora pucciniophila M.J.Park & H.D.Shin (2011)
- Cladophialophora samoensis Badali, de Hoog & A.A. Padhye (2008)
- Cladophialophora saturnica Badali, V.O.Carvalho, V.A.Vicente, Attili-Angelis, Kwiatk., van den Ende & de Hoog (2009)
- Cladophialophora scillae (Deighton) Crous, U.Braun & K. Schub. (2007)
- Cladophialophora subtilis Badali & de Hoog (2008)
- Cladophialophora sylvestris Crous & de Hoog (2007)
- Cladophialophora tortuosa Obase, Douhan, Yos.Matsuda & M.E.Sm. (2015)
- Cladophialophora tumbae Kiyuna, K.D.An, R. Kigawa & Sugiy. (2017)
- Cladophialophora tumulicola Kiyuna, K.D.An, R.Kigawa & Sugiy. (2017)
- Cladophialophora yegresii de Hoog (2007)
