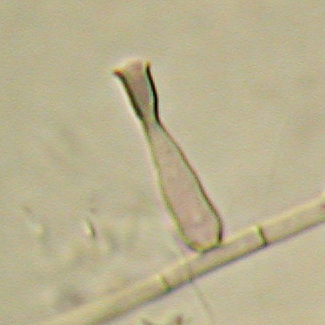
- Phialide with darker collarette

Scientific classification
- Kingdom: Fungi
- Division: Ascomycota
- Class: Eurotiomycetes
- Order: Chaetothyriales
- Family: Herpotrichiellaceae
- Genus: Phialophora
- Species: P. verrucosa

Binomial name
- Phialophora verrucosa Medlar (1915)

Synonyms
- Cadophora americana Nannfeldt (1934); Phialophora americana (Nannf.) S.Hughes (1958); Fonsecaea pedrosoi var. phialophora Carrión

= Phialophora verrucosa =

Species of fungus

Phialophora verrucosa is a pathogenic, dematiaceous fungus that is a common cause of chromoblastomycosis. It has also been reported to cause subcutaneous phaeohyphomycosis and mycetoma in very rare cases. In the natural environment, it can be found in rotting wood, soil, wasp nests, and plant debris. P. verrucosa is sometimes referred to as Phialophora americana, a closely related environmental species which, along with P. verrucosa, is also categorized in the P. carrionii clade.

== History ==
The fungus was first isolated by Edgar Mathias Medlar in 1915 from a chronic skin lesion on the buttock of a 22-year-old man in Boston, Massachusetts who presented with verrucous lesions on the buttocks and feet. In consultation with Roland Thaxter, Medlar considered the fungus to represent a previously undescribed genus because the successive separation of the conidia and their maintained attachment to the cup-shaped portion of the sporogenous cells were unique characteristics not seen in any other genus. He named the genus Phialophora, meaning "shallow cup bearer" to represent the characteristic shape and the species epithet verrucosa, in reference to the resemblance of the lesion to "verrucous tuberculosis". Thaxter suggested that P. verrucosa should be classified under the subdivision, 'Chalarae' of Saccardo's classification system.

== Morphology and physiology ==
Phialophora verrucosa produces vase-shaped phialides with dark brown, cup-shaped collarettes. Each phialide is typically 3–4 μm wide and 4–7 μm long. Teardrop-shaped, smooth-walled conidia are formed at the apices of the collarettes and accumulate in clusters. Conidia are typically 2.5–4 μm by 1.5 3 μm in size. Hyphae are brown, cylindrical, and septate and are composed of thick-walled cells. The hyphae do not produce conidia.P. verrucosa grows well over a range of temperatures, 21–37 °C (70–99 °F) with an optimal growth temperature of 30 °C (86 °F). Colonies grow slowly on oxalic acid and malt extract agar. Grown on Sabouraud's agar at 3 °C (37 °F), the colony attains a diameter of 3–4 cm after 2 weeks incubation.

== Ecology ==
Although P. verrucosa was originally discovered in human tissue, it is known to occur naturally in soil, plant debris, wasp nests, and rotting wood. In a study where multiple strains of P. verrucosa were found growing in rotting wood, soil, and the bark and log of pine trees in Japan, it was found that these isolates from the natural environment had no distinct differences from P. verrucosa isolated from human tissue. P. verrucosa is widespread and can be found in Africa, Asia, Australia, North and South America, and Europe. Most strains of P. verrucosa available in culture collections are derived from human mycoses.

== Pathology ==
Phialophora verrucosa is a common cause of chromoblastomycosis, and a much rarer cause of subcutaneous phaeohyphomycosis and mycetoma. All three diseases have the potential to become chronic. P. verrucosa has also been reported to cause cutaneous infections, prosthetic valve endocarditis, and mycotic keratitis. However, due to its low pathogenicity, P. verrucosa does not often cause infection. Infections caused by P. verrucosa can occur in both immunocompromised individuals, such as individuals who are undergoing immunosuppressive therapies or who have AIDS, as well as in healthy individuals. A healthy individual who became infected with P. verrucosa gained initial exposure through direct contact of the skin with soil containing the fungus. Cases of chromoblastomycosis, subcutaneous phaehyphomycosis, and cutaneous infections caused by P. verrucosa have been reported to present with crusted, warty lesions found on the face, hands, shin, and sole of the foot. Lesions are rarely observed on the back and upper limbs.

== Treatment ==
Antifungal drugs like itraconazole and terbinafine are typically used to treat infections caused by P. verrucosa. Amphotericin B, another antifungal drug, is only used occasionally, as it is cardiotoxic and is unsuitable for long-term therapy. While the spread of chromoblastomycosis to the muscle and bone is usually rare, in cases where antifungal drugs alone are insufficient in controlling the dissemination of the infection, limb amputation is required. Topical heat therapy, such as the use of disposable pocket warmers that sustain a temperature of 40 °C or greater for a period of 12 hours, as well as localized cryotherapy, may be effective in preventing the growth of P. verrucosa and treating lesions. P. verrucosa exhibits some resistance to antifungal drugs, and prescribed treatments often require a combination of antifungal drugs. The use of fluconazole, followed by the combined use of oral itraconazole and the topical application of copper sulphate solution, was reportedly successful in treating a phaehyphomycotic ulcer caused by P. verrucosa. In vitro, different isolates of P. verrucosa respond differently to the same combinations of antifungal drugs. The combination of amphotericin B and terbinafine was observed to cause a synergistic effect for some isolates but cause no effect in others.
