= Fonsecaea nubica =

Scientific classification
- Kingdom: Fungi
- Division: Ascomycota
- Class: Eurotiomycetes
- Order: Chaetothyriales
- Family: Herpotrichiellaceae
- Genus: Fonsecaea
- Species: F. nubica

Binomial name
- Fonsecaea nubica Najafzadeh et al., 2010

Species of fungus

Fonsecaea nubica is a species of fungi from the family Herpotrichiellaceae. F. nubica is known to cause a serious subcutaneous infection known as chromoblastomycosis. F. nubica was identified as a distinct species in 2010 using multilocus molecular data.

== Characteristics ==
Fonsecaea nubica produces dark, velvety colonies with Cladiosporium-type conidia. F. nubica possesses dark brown septate hyphae with conidiophores that are highly branched at the tips.

Fonsecaea nubica is classified as a dematiaceous mold, a group of fungi that possess melanin in their cell walls. The presence of melanin in this fungi's cell wall causes their hyphal structures to appear brown under microscopy.

== Human disease ==
Fonsecaea nubica is an prominent causative agent of chromoblastomycosis, a chronic fungal infection of the skin and subcutaneous tissue. Infection typically occurs following traumatic inoculation of the pathogen into the wound. This species is more predominantly encountered in tropical regions. Symptoms of chromoblastomycosis include cauliflower-like lesions.

=== Treatment ===
Chromoblastomycosis is difficult to treat. Itraconazole is usually the first-line therapy for chromoblastomycosis, with cure rates ranging from 15-80%.
