= Capronia =

Scientific classification
- Domain: Eukaryota
- Kingdom: Fungi
- Division: Ascomycota
- Class: Eurotiomycetes
- Order: Chaetothyriales
- Family: Herpotrichiellaceae
- Genus: Capronia; Sacc. (1883)

Type species
- Capronia sexdecimspora (Cooke) Sacc. (1883)

Genus of fungi

Capronia is a genus of fungi in the family Herpotrichiellaceae. It has about 80 species.

== Species ==
- Capronia acutiseta Samuels (1987)
- Capronia albimontana (M.E.Barr) E.Müll., Petrini, P.J.Fisher, Samuels & Rossman (1987)
- Capronia amylacea Etayo (2017)
- Capronia andina Etayo (2003)
- Capronia apiculata M.E.Barr (1991)
- Capronia arctica M.E.Barr (1991)
- Capronia austrocedri R.M.Sánchez, A.N.Mill. & Bianchin. (2019)
- Capronia baeomycetis Diederich (1997)
- Capronia borealis M.E.Barr (1991)
- Capronia brabeji Marinc., M.J.Wingf. & Crous (2008)
- Capronia camelliae-yunnanensis M.Raza, Z.F.Zhang & L.Cai (2019)
- Capronia capucina R.M. Sánchez, A.N.Mill. & Bianchin. (2019)
- Capronia castlerockii (Subhedar & V.G.Rao) Friebes (2011)
- Capronia chlorospora (Ellis & Everh.) M.E.Barr (1991)
- Capronia ciliomaris (Kohlm.) E.Müll., Petrini, P.J.Fisher, Samuels & Rossman (1987)
- Capronia cogtii Zhurb. (2019)
- Capronia collapsa (Math.) M.E.Barr (1991)
- Capronia commonsii (Ellis & Everh.) M.E.Barr (1991)
- Capronia coronata Samuels (1987)
- Capronia dactylotricha Unter., Cand. & Samuels (1995)
- Capronia dryadis M.E.Barr (1991)
- Capronia epilobarina S.Y.Kondr. & D.J. Galloway (1995)
- Capronia epimyces M.E.Barr (1991)
- Capronia etayoi Flakus & Kukwa (2012)
- Capronia exigua M.E.Barr (1991)
- Capronia fungicola (Samuels & E.Müll.) Unter. (1994)
- Capronia fusispora (M.E. Barr) E.Müll., Petrini, P.J.Fisher, Samuels & Rossman (1987)
- Capronia glabra W.H. Hsieh, Chi Y. Chen & Sivan. (1997)
- Capronia guatemalensis Etayo & van den Boom (2006)
- Capronia hafellneri Nograsek (1990)
- Capronia holmiorum Friebes (2012)
- Capronia hypotrachynae Etayo & Diederich (1998)
- Capronia inconspicua (Munk) E.Müll., Petrini, P.J.Fisher, Samuels & Rossman (1987)
- Capronia irregularis M.E.Barr (1972)
- Capronia josefhafellneri Zhurb. & Etayo (2016)
- Capronia juniperina (K.Holm & L.Holm) O.E.Erikss. (1992)
- Capronia kleinmondensis Marinc., M.J.Wingf. & Crous (2008)
- Capronia leopoldiana Etayo (2008)
- Capronia leptogii Etayo & Diederich (2002)
- Capronia leucadendri Marinc., M.J.Wingf. & Crous (2008)
- Capronia longispora (M.E.Barr) E.Müll., Petrini, P.J.Fisher, Samuels & Rossman (1987)
- Capronia longonigra (Norman) M.B.Aguirre (1991)
- Capronia magellanica Etayo (2008)
- Capronia mansonii (Schol-Schwarz) E.Müll., Petrini, P.J.Fisher, Samuels & Rossman (1987)
- Capronia minima (Ellis & Everh.) M.E.Barr (1991)
- Capronia minutosetosa Halıcı, D.Hawksw., A.Ö.Türk & Candan (2010)
- Capronia montana M.E.Barr (1991)
- Capronia moravica (Petr.) E.Müll., Petrini, P.J.Fisher, Samuels & Rossman (1987)
- Capronia muellerelloides Etayo & Sipman (2017)
- Capronia munkii Unter. (1995)
- Capronia muriformis Friebes (2011)
- Capronia mycophila Schmid-Heckel (1988)
- Capronia nigerrima (R.R.Bloxam) M.E.Barr (1991)
- Capronia normandinae R.Sant. & D.Hawksw. (1990)
- Capronia obesispora Réblová (1998)
- Capronia paranectrioides Etayo, Flakus & Kukwa (2013)
- Capronia parasitica (Ellis & Everh.) E.Müll., Petrini, P.J.Fisher, Samuels & Rossman (1987)
- Capronia perpusilla Réblová (1996)
- Capronia pilosella (P.Karst.) E.Müll., Petrini, P.J.Fisher, Samuels & Rossman (1987)
- Capronia pleiospora (Mouton) Sacc. (1891)
- Capronia polyspora (M.E.Barr) E.Müll., Petrini, P.J.Fisher, Samuels & Rossman (1987)
- Capronia populicola M.E.Barr (1991)
- Capronia porothelia (Berk. & M.A.Curtis) M.E.Barr (1991)
- Capronia potentillae (E.Müll.) E.Müll., Petrini, P.J.Fisher, Samuels & Rossman (1987)
- Capronia proteae Marinc., M.J.Wingf. & Crous (2008)
- Capronia pseudonormandinae Diederich (1997)
- Capronia pulcherrima (Munk) E.Müll., Petrini, P.J.Fisher, Samuels & Rossman (1987)
- Capronia rubiginosa R.M.Sánchez, A.N.Mill. & Bianchin. (2019)
- Capronia santessoniana Etayo (2010)
- Capronia semiimmersa (Cand. & Sulmont) Unter. & F.A.Naveau (1999)
- Capronia setosa (M.E. Barr) E. Müll., Petrini, P.J.Fisher, Samuels & Rossman (1987)
- Capronia sexdecimspora (Cooke) Sacc. (1883)
- Capronia solitaria Etayo (2017)
- Capronia suijae Tsurykau & Etayo (2017)
- Capronia svrcekiana Réblová (1996)
- Capronia thamnoliae Zhurb. (2012)
- Capronia triseptata (Diederich) Etayo (1996)
- Capronia vaga (Rehm) Friebes (2011)
- Capronia villosa Samuels (1987)
