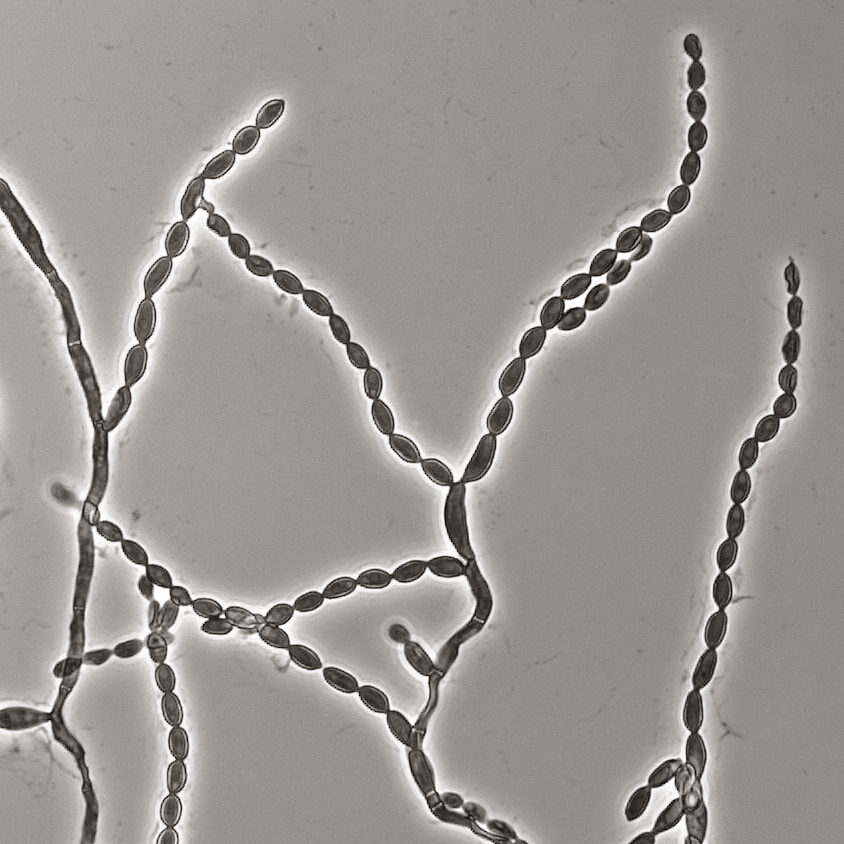

Scientific classification
- Kingdom: Fungi
- Division: Ascomycota
- Class: Eurotiomycetes
- Order: Chaetothyriales
- Family: Herpotrichiellaceae
- Genus: Cladophialophora
- Species: C. bantiana

Binomial name
- Cladophialophora bantiana de Hoog, Kwon-Chung & McGinnis, (1995)

Synonyms
- Torula bantiana Sacc., in Saccardo, (1912); Cladosporium bantianum (Sacc.) Borelli, (1960); Xylohypha bantiana (Sacc.) McGinnis, Borelli, Padhye & Ajello, (1986); Cladosporium trichoides C.W. Emmons Binford, Thompson & Gorham, (1952); Cladosporium trichoides C.W. Emmons var. trichoides Binford, Thompson & Gorham, (1952); Cladosporium trichoides var. chlamydosporum Kwon-Chung, (1978)

= Cladophialophora bantiana =

Species of fungus

Cladophialophora bantiana (C. bantiana) is a melanin-producing mold known to cause brain abscesses in humans. It is one of the most common causes of systemic phaeohyphomycosis in mammals. Cladophialophora bantiana is a member of the ascomycota and has been isolated from soil samples from around the world.

== Etymology ==
Cladophialophora bantiana was first isolated from a brain abscess in 1911 by Guido Banti and was described by Pier Andrea Saccardo in 1912 as Torula bantiana. In 1960, the fungus was reclassified by Borelli as Cladosporium bantianum. A morphologically similar species, Cladosporium trichodes was described by Emmons et al. in 1952. Cladosporium trichodes was widely believed to be a different species until 1995 when de Hoog et al. showed it to identical to C. bantiana based on phylogenetic analysis.

== Morphology ==
Cladophialophora bantiana exhibits predominantly hyphal growth both in vivo and in vitro. The normal morphology consists of dark coloured largely unbranched, wavy chains of conidia, individually 5–10 μm in length. The dark colour is due to the presence of the dark pigment melanin. Hyphae are septate, as is the case for species belonging to the phylum ascomycota.

In culture, the colony is black with a velvety texture or dark grey in color, depending on the type of agar medium it is grown on. It grows on routine fungal culture media, including potato dextrose agar, oatmeal agar, and malt agar. Cladophialophora bantiana has been reported to grow in culture under temperatures ranging from 14-42 °C with optimal growth around 30 °C. Cladophialophora bantiana grows slowly in vitro, taking ~15 days to mature when grown at 25–30 °C. Cladophialophora bantiana can be distinguished from other species of the genus Cladophialophora by the presence of secreted urease enzyme.

In samples isolated from cerebral tissue compared to cultured samples, a predominance of unbranched conidial chains and absence of conidiophores has been reported. For visualization of hyphal elements in brain abscesses, Fontana-Masson or lactophenol cotton blue staining can be used.

== Infection ==
Cladophialophora bantiana can cause infection in several species of mammals including cats, dogs, and humans. In one case in a dog, C. bantiana was identified as the causative agent of eumycetoma. It has been known to cause systemic phaeohyphomycosis in both cats and dogs.

Cladophialophora bantiana is known to cause a cerebral phaeohyphomycosis affecting the central nervous system in humans. It is unique in that it causes primary cerebral infection where the first symptoms of disease are of neurological nature, rather than disseminated. It is hypothesized that predilection of this species for the central nervous system is due to the presence of a specialized melanin, which may allow fungi to cross the blood–brain barrier. However, this is unlikely since fungal melanin is structurally and biochemically different from human melanin and other species of highly pigmented pathogenic fungi such as Madurella do not show neurotropism. It has also been suggested that the presence of introns in the 18S rDNA subunit of Cladophialophora may be related to the preference of C. bantiana for the CNS, however more research is required to determine the mechanism of this.

Radiologically, the disease caused by C. bantiana may be difficult to distinguish from cancers such as glioblastoma, as contrast-enhanced images show irregular heterogeneous lesions with significant surrounding edema.

In a review of 101 cases of phaeohyphomycosis by Revankar et al., C. bantiana was the causal agent responsible for 48% of cases. It most often manifests as brain abscesses in immunocompetent people, however meningitis and myelitis were observed in a limited number of cases. Although the majority of the patients were immunocompetent (73%), infection is also commonly seen in immunocompromised patients. Clinical symptoms of infection are varied and can include headache, seizure, arm pain, and ataxia. The mortality rate is about 70%, with better outcomes observed in patients who underwent complete excision of the abscess. Since the majority of patients infected were seemingly healthy, the means of exposure to the fungi is still unclear. However, inhalation is the likely route of entrance.

Cases of infection are most commonly found in subtropical regions with high average humidity although cases have also been identified in the US, Canada and the UK. Cases from regions with hot, arid climate are rare. It has also been suggested that doing tasks with a high level of exposure to soil such as farming and gardening are associated with higher risk of infection.

== Treatment ==
Since infection is very rare, there is no standard treatment for invasive C. bantiana infection.

In 2021, the European Confederation of Medical Mycology, the International Society for Human and Animal Mycology, and the American Society for Microbiology created guidelines for rare mold infections, which includes C. bantiana. Current recommendations conclude that liposomal amphotericin B alone or in combination with an azole and/or echinocandin or voriconazole monotherapy is supported as first-line therapy. 5-Fluorocytosine can be used in combination with the other recommend antifungals, however, it has little supportive data. In addition, surgical resection of the fungal abscess is often necessary. Treatments utilizing only one of these approaches have had higher fatality rates, and the best outcomes are reported in cases utilizing both surgical and antifungal therapy; however, even with this approach, mortality remains high.
