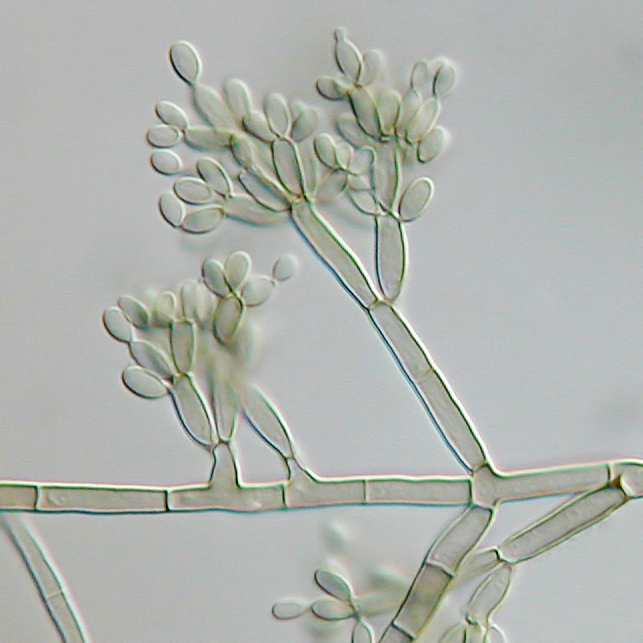
- Conidiophores of Fonsecaea pedrosoi from slide culture on Modified Leonian's agar

Scientific classification
- Domain: Eukaryota
- Kingdom: Fungi
- Division: Ascomycota
- Class: Eurotiomycetes
- Order: Chaetothyriales
- Family: Herpotrichiellaceae
- Genus: Fonsecaea
- Species: F. pedrosoi

Binomial name
- Fonsecaea pedrosoi (Brumpt) Negroni (1936)

Synonyms
- Hormodendrum pedrosoi Brumpt (1922); Phialophora pedrosoi (Brumpt) Redaelli & Cif. (1941); Fonsecaea compactum (Carrion) Carrion (1940); Rhinocladiella pedrosoi (Brumpt) Schol-Schwarz (1968)

= Fonsecaea pedrosoi =

Species of fungus

Fonsecaea pedrosoi is a fungal species in the family Herpotrichiellaceae, and the major causative agent of chromoblastomycosis. This species is commonly found in tropical and sub-tropical regions, especially in South America, where it grows as a soil saprotroph. Farming activities in the endemic zone are a risk factor for the development of chromoblastomycosis.

== Taxonomy ==
Fonsecaea is a genus of ascomycetous fungi affiliated with the family Herpotrichiellaceae. The genus comprises three sibling species, all with pathogenic potential: F. pedrosoi, F. monophora and F. nubica. The species was first formally described in 1922 as Hormodendrum pedrosoi by French parasitologist Émile Brumpt. Pablo Negroni transferred it to the genus Fonsecaea in 1936.

Sparingly branched, brownish conidiophores produce clusters of one-celled, club-shaped conidia in short, dry, unbranched chains. A Phialophora-like asexual state sometimes appears along with yeast cells at low pH.

== Ecology and distribution ==
Fonsecaea pedrosoi occurs in soil and on plants and trees where it grows as a saprotroph. It is found predominantly in tropical regions especially South- and Central America. All three recognized species of Fonsecaea exhibit geographically patterned genetic variation. The closely related species F. monophora and F. nubica are distributed worldwide and show the greater population-level genetic diversity than the geographically restricted F. pedrosoi. Environmental surveys have documented the recovery of F. pedrosoi on rotting wood of the Cambara tree (Gochnatia polymorpha) from the Brazilian Corporation of Agricultural Research forest in Colombo, Paraná, Brazil. It has also been isolated from living trees, stumps, woodpiles and fence posts in central Nigeria.

== Physiology ==
Clinical isolates of grow consistently at temperatures up to 35 °C (95 °F). In contrast, environmental isolates of F. pedrosoi exhibit growth consistently up to 35 °C, and irregularly up to 37 °C (99 °F) Physiological studies have shown the degradation of urea and tyrosine, and the lack of growth on the proteins gelatin, casein and the purines xanthine and hypoxanthine. Likewise, lipase activity was demonstrated, but phospholipase, collagenase and amylase were not expressed.

== Human disease ==
Fonsecaea pedrosoi is one of several main causative agents of human chromoblastomycosis, a chronic fungal infection localized to skin and subcutaneous tissue. The disease was first described by Alexandrino Pedroso in 1911. The fungus infects the host through the traumatic implantation of sexual spores known as conidia or hyphal fragments. Once introduced in the subcutaneous tissues, the propagules germinate to establish an invasive mycelium associated with sclerotic cells. This proliferation manifests as a well-defined, chronically progressive, crusted ulceration of the skin known as chromoblastomycosis. Clinically it is often misdiagnosed as squamous cell carcinoma.

=== Histology ===
The disease is characterized by the appearance of spherical, brownish yellow cells with thick, darkly pigmented walls. The presence of the agent is associated with host cell proliferation and enlargement known as hyperplasia localized to the stratified squamous epithelium and the formation of mycotic granulomas. Sclerotic bodies are present both extracellularly and intracellularly throughout the affected tissue and are a defining feature of chromoblastomycosis. The melanin content of sclerotic bodies may be important in the establishment of host immune responses.

=== Risk factors for infection ===
Farmers in Central and South America are most susceptible to chromoblastomycosis due to F. pedrosoi. Infection often occurs in the upper body and legs of agricultural laborers since these areas are more prone to exposure to infected soil, plant debris or other fomites. The sex ratio of disease is globally variable. In Brazil, the agent has shown a 4:1 proclivity for men, likely as a function of exposure differences relating to work and lifestyle, while Japanese infections have shown evenly distributed infection rates between the sexes.

=== Treatment ===
Infections by F. pedrosoi are more difficult to treat than those of F. monophora. In severe cases, treatment is quite complex and involves a combination of antifungal drug therapy and surgical excision. Antifungal agents like itraconazole and terbinafine are commonly used. Surgery is often used to treat small, localized infections, although cryotherapy has been suggested an alternative approach. Topical application of amphotericin B followed by long-term administration of oral antifungal therapy has been shown to be effective in the treatment of corneal chromoblastomycosis from F. pedrosoi. The diagnosis and treatment of chromoblastomycosis by F. pedrosoi remains clinically challenging due to the relative rarity of the disease, its slow, chronic nature, the absence of clinical features readily differentiating it from other more common diseases such as squamous cell carcinoma, the restricted nature of therapies, and the lack of literature.
