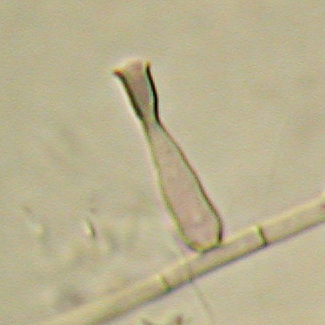

Scientific classification
- Domain: Eukaryota
- Kingdom: Fungi
- Division: Ascomycota
- Class: Eurotiomycetes
- Order: Chaetothyriales
- Family: Herpotrichiellaceae
- Genus: Phialophora; Medlar (1915)

Species
- Phialophora americana; Phialophora asteris; Phialophora avicenniae; Phialophora bubakii; Phialophora cinerescens; Phialophora europaea; Phialophora parasitica; Phialophora reptans; Phialophora repens; Phialophora verrucosa

= Phialophora =

Genus of fungi

Phialophora is a form genus of fungus with short conidiophores, sometimes reduced to phialides; their conidia are unicellular. They may be parasites (including on humans), or saprophytic (including on apples).

Genetic analysis of Phialophora shows that it is a paraphyletic grouping.

The conidia are produced from a flask shaped phialide. Mature, spherical, to oval conidia are extruded from phialides and usually accumulate around it.

Some members of Phialophora are involved in symbiotic relationships with leafcutter ants where they grow on the cuticle of the ants and fulfill a saprophytic role that aids in the fungal gardening on which the ants rely.
