= Chromoblastomycosis =

- Other names: Chromomycosis, Cladosporiosis, Fonseca's disease, Pedroso's disease, Phaeosporotrichosis, or Verrucous dermatitis
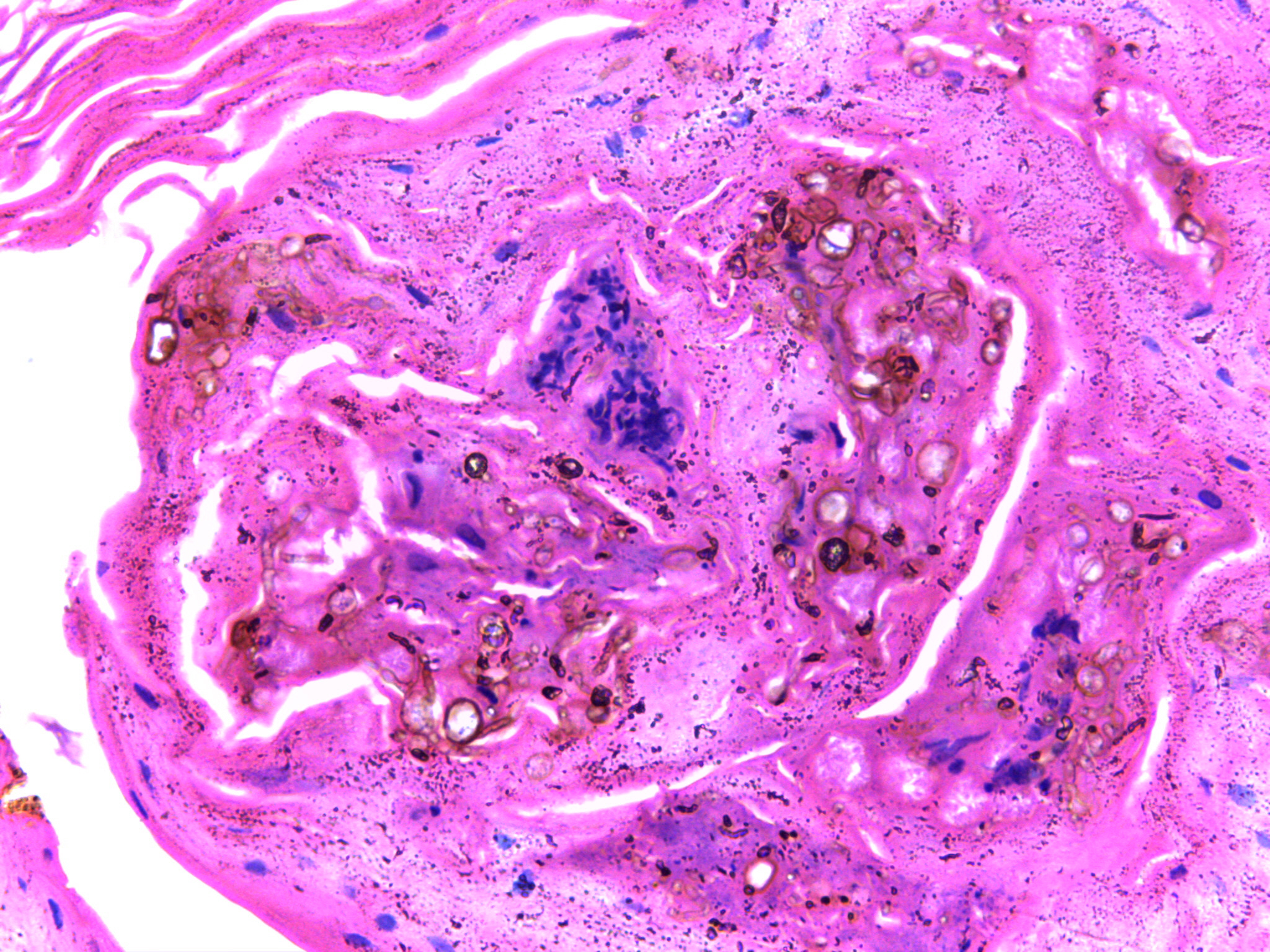
- Micrograph of chromoblastomycosis showing sclerotic bodies
- Specialty: Infectious disease, Dermatology

Chromoblastomycosis is a long-term fungal infection of the skin and subcutaneous tissue (a chronic subcutaneous mycosis).

It can be caused by many different types of fungi which become implanted under the skin, often by thorns or splinters. Chromoblastomycosis spreads very slowly.

It is rarely fatal and usually has a good prognosis, but it can be very difficult to cure. Several treatment options exist, including medication and surgery.

The infection occurs most commonly in tropical or subtropical climates, often in rural areas.

== Signs and symptoms ==
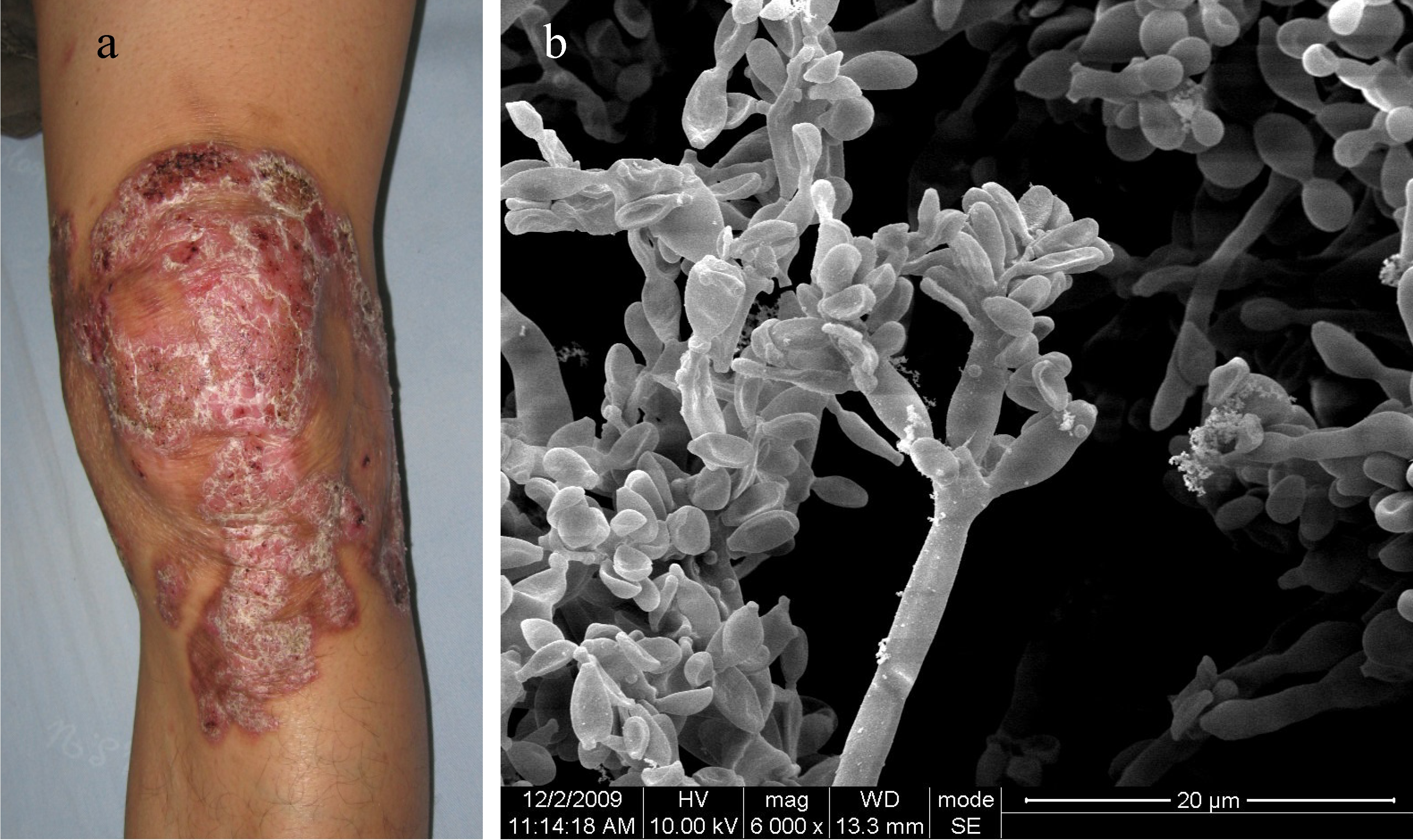
A 34-year-old man with a 12-year history of chromoblastomycosis and electron micrograph of his skin showing Fonsecaea pedrosoi spores.

The initial trauma causing the infection is often forgotten or not noticed. The infection builds at the site over the years, and a small red papule (skin elevation) appears. The lesion is usually not painful, with few, if any, symptoms. Patients rarely seek medical care at this point.

Several complications may occur. Usually, the infection slowly spreads to the surrounding tissue while remaining localized to the area around the original wound. However, sometimes the fungi may spread through the blood vessels or lymph vessels, producing metastatic lesions at distant sites. Another possibility is secondary infection with bacteria. This may lead to lymph stasis (obstruction of the lymph vessels) and elephantiasis. The nodules may become ulcerated, or multiple nodules may grow and coalesce, affecting a large area of a limb.

== Cause ==
Chromoblastomycosis is believed to originate in minor trauma to the skin, usually from vegetative material such as thorns or splinters; this trauma implants the fungus in the subcutaneous tissue. In many cases, the patient will not notice or remember the initial trauma, as symptoms often do not appear for years. Prominent species of fungi that cause chromoblastomycosis are:

- Cladophialophora bantiana causes both cutaneous chromoblastomycosis and systemic phaeohyphomycosis
- Cladophialophora carrionii
- Fonsecaea compacta
- Fonsecaea nubica
- Fonsecaea pedrosoi
- Phialophora verrucosa
- Rhinocladiella aquaspersa

== Mechanism ==
Over months to years, an erythematous papule appears at the site of inoculation. Although the mycosis slowly spreads, it usually remains localized to the skin and subcutaneous tissue. Hematogenous and/or lymphatic spread may occur. Multiple nodules may appear on the same limb, sometimes coalescing into a large plaque. Secondary bacterial infection may occur, sometimes inducing lymphatic obstruction. The central portion of the lesion may heal, producing a scar, or it may ulcerate.

== Diagnosis ==
The most informative test is to scrape the lesion and add potassium hydroxide (KOH), then examine it under a microscope. (KOH scrapings are commonly used to examine fungal infections.) The pathognomonic finding is observing medlar bodies (also called muriform bodies or sclerotic cells). Scrapings from the lesion can also be cultured to identify the organism involved. Blood tests and imaging studies are not commonly used. On histology, chromoblastomycosis manifests as pigmented yeasts resembling "copper pennies". Special stains, such as periodic acid Schiff and Gömöri methenamine silver, can be used to demonstrate the fungal organisms if needed.

== Prevention ==
No preventive measure is known. At least one study found a correlation between walking barefoot in endemic areas and the occurrence of chromoblastomycosis on the foot.

== Treatment ==
Chromoblastomycosis is very difficult to cure. Treatment may include surgical excision for mild cases and long-term antifungal therapy for severe cases. Intraconazole is considered the first line therapy and cure rates range from 15–80%.

The primary treatments of choice are:

- Itraconazole, an antifungal azole, is given orally, with or without flucytosine.
- Alternatively, cryosurgery with liquid nitrogen has also been shown to be effective.

Other treatment options are the antifungal drugs voriconazole, terbinafine, another antifungal azole posaconazole, and heat therapy.

Antibiotics may be used to treat bacterial superinfections.

Amphotericin B has also been used.

Photodynamic therapy is a newer type of therapy used to treat chromoblastomycosis.

== Prognosis ==
The prognosis for chromoblastomycosis is very good for small lesions. Severe cases are difficult to cure, although the prognosis is still good. The primary complications are ulceration, lymphedema, and secondary bacterial infection. A few cases of malignant transformation to squamous cell carcinoma have been reported. Chromoblastomycosis is very rarely fatal.

== Epidemiology ==
Chromoblastomycosis occurs globally, most commonly in rural areas in tropical or subtropical climates.

It is most common in rural areas between approximately 30°N and 30°S latitude. Over two-thirds of patients are male, usually between the ages of 30 and 50. A correlation with HLA-A29 suggests genetic factors may play a role, as well.

== Social and cultural ==
Chromoblastomycosis is considered a neglected tropical disease, affects mainly people living in poverty, and causes considerable morbidity, stigma, and discrimination.

== See also ==
- List of cutaneous conditions
