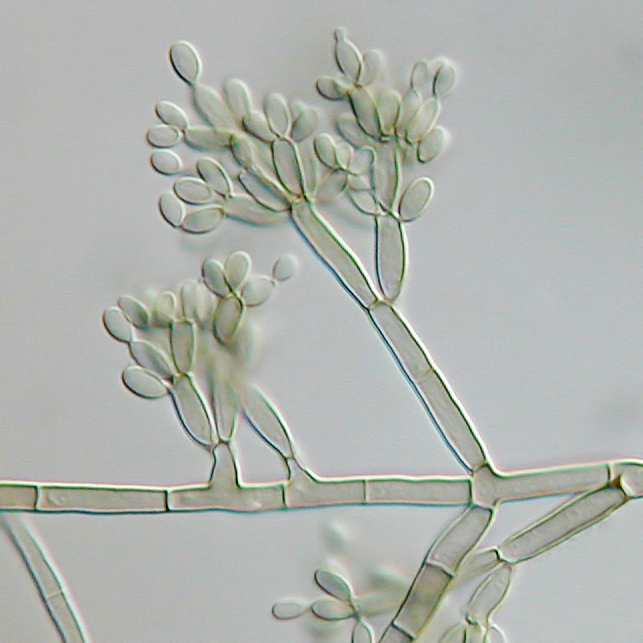
- Conidiophores of Fonsecaea pedrosoi

Scientific classification
- Kingdom: Fungi
- Division: Ascomycota
- Class: Eurotiomycetes
- Order: Chaetothyriales
- Family: Herpotrichiellaceae; Munk (1953)

Type genus
- Herpotrichiella Petr. (1914)

Genera
- See text

= Herpotrichiellaceae =

Family of fungi

Herpotrichiellaceae is a family of ascomycetous fungi within the order Chaetothyriales and within the class Eurotiomycetes. It contains 16 genera and about 270 species. The type genus of the family, Herpotrichiella, is now synonymous with Capronia.

It contains human–pathogenic species.

== Genera ==
This is a list of the genera in the Herpotrichiellaceae, based on a 2020 review and summary of fungal classification by Wijayawardene and colleagues. Following the genus name is the taxonomic authority (those who first circumscribed the genus; standardized author abbreviations are used), year of publication, and the number of species:

- Aculeata W.Dong, H.Zhang & K.D.Hyde – 1 sp.
- Brycekendrickomyces Crous & M.J.Wingf. – 1 sp.
- Capronia Sacc. – ca. 81 spp.
- Cladophialophora Borelli – 35 spp.
- Exophiala J.W. Carmich. – 51 spp.
- Fonsecaea Negroni – 8 spp.
- Marinophialophora J.F.Li, Phook. & K.D.Hyde – 1 sp.
- Melanoctona Qing Tian, Doilom & K.D.Hyde – 1 sp.
- Metulocladosporiella Crous, Schroers, J.Z.Groenew., U.Braun & K.Schub. – 6 spp.
- Minimelanolocus R.F.Castañeda & Heredia – 33 spp.
- Phialophora Medlar – 7 spp.
- Pleomelogramma Speg. – 2 spp.
- Rhinocladiella Nannf. – 17 spp.
- Sorocybe Fr. – 3 spp.
- Thysanorea Arzanlou, W.Gams & Crous – 2 spp.
- Veronaea Cif. & Montemart. – 20 spp.
