= Exophiala hongkongensis =

Scientific classification
- Kingdom: Fungi
- Division: Ascomycota
- Class: Eurotiomycetes
- Order: Chaetothyriales
- Family: Herpotrichiellaceae
- Genus: Exophiala
- Species: E. hongkongensis

Binomial name
- Exophiala hongkongensis Woo, Ngan, Tsang, Ling, Chan, Leung, Yuen, Lau (2013)

Species of fungus

Exophiala hongkongensis is an ascomycete fungus species. Described as new to science in 2013, it was discovered on the toenail clipping of a patient with the fungal disease onychomycosis.

== Taxonomy ==
The fungus strain, originally named HKU32^{T}, was isolated from a toenail clipping of a 68-year-old female patient with onychomycosis at the Queen Mary Hospital in Hong Kong. The overall morphology of the fungus aligned it with Exophiala, but it had phenotypic characteristics that were not consistent with any other species of that genus. Molecular analysis of four independent DNA regions (ITS, Rpb1, beta-tubulin, and beta-actin) confirmed that it was a new species. It is most closely related to Exophiala nishimurae, with which it forms a clade that is sister to the species E. xenobiotica.

== Description ==
When grown on Sabouraud dextrose agar culture media, the fungus grows slowly as black, slimy, yeast-like colonies that reach a diameter of 2 mm after 14 days at 25 °C (77 °F). Then the colony centers develop a velvety texture and become greenish-gray and dome-shaped, while retaining a slimy and yeast-like margin. After 14 days, the ellipsoidal yeast-like cells are brown when stained with lactophenol cotton blue, and measure 6 by 3.5 μm. They have ringed zones that pinch off to create budding cells. The mycelia of the fungus are swollen and form torulose hyphae (swollen and constricted at intervals) that are pinched at their ends. When the colonies become velvety, the mycelia are not swollen, and conidia are formed in clusters. The average length of the conidiophores is about 10 μm. The conidia are oval to roughly spherical, and typically measure 3 by 2 μm.

== Pathogenesis ==
Exophiala hongkongensis is known only from Hong Kong. Known cases of onychomycosis caused by Exophiala are rare, although this genus commonly causes related skin infections such as phaeohyphomycosis, chromoblastomycosis, and eumycetoma. Previous instances of onychomycosis had been previously traced to E. dermatiditis and E. jeanselmei. In addition to Exophiala hongkongensis, Woo and colleagues identified additional cases caused by E. oligosperma and E. bergeri. All known cases are associated with an underlying disease that causes an immunosuppressive state; in the case of E. hongkonensis, the patient had hypertension.
