= Exophiala pisciphila =

Scientific classification
- Kingdom: Fungi
- Division: Ascomycota
- Class: Eurotiomycetes
- Order: Chaetothyriales
- Family: Herpotrichiellaceae
- Genus: Exophiala
- Species: E. pisciphila

Binomial name
- Exophiala pisciphila McGinnis & Ajello (1974)

Species of fungus

Exophiala pisciphila is a mesophilic black yeast and member of the dark septate endophytes. This saprotrophic fungus is found commonly in marine and soil environments. It is abundant in harsh environments like soil contaminated with heavy metals. E. pisciphila forms symbiotic relationships with various plants by colonizing on roots, conferring resistance to drought and heavy metal stress. It is an opportunistic pathogen that commonly causes infections in captive fish and amphibians, while rarely causing disease in humans. Secondary metabolites produced by this species have potential clinical antibiotic and antiretroviral applications.

== History and taxonomy ==
In 1969, Nikola Fijan first described a systemic mycosis outbreak in channel catfish from a pond in Alabama and identified it as Exophiala salmonis. In 1974, Michael McGinnis and Libero Ajello reevaluated the fungus and identified it as a new species Exophiala pisciphila. The specific epithet pisciphila is a linguistic barbarism, combining the Latin word piscis meaning "fish" with the Greek suffix -philos (φίλος) meaning "loving".

== Habitat and ecology ==
Exophiala pisciphila is commonly found in soil, plants and water in North America, Netherlands, United Kingdom, and Australia. E. pisciphila occurs as a colonist or pathogen in cold-blooded vertebrates such as various commercially cultivated fish and amphibians. It has low host specificity. Captive fish are especially susceptible due to the confined space of aquariums and accumulation of fungal particles. Decorative pieces, stones or contaminated food in aquariums can all be reservoirs of E. pisciphila. This fungus has a high tolerance to certain metals ions and has been encountered in harsh environments such as heavy metal polluted soils. When this fungus colonizes plant roots, it enhances plant tolerance to heavy metal ions. Symbiotic relationships with host plants also allow for improved growth performance and plant survival rate in drought conditions.

== Growth and morphology ==
Exophiala pisciphila is an exclusively asexual fungus that exhibits both filamentous and yeast-like growth. Due to its variable growth forms and the dark pigmentation of its cell walls, it is considered a member of the descriptive grouping of similar fungi known as the black yeasts. E. pisciphila forms slow growing colonies approximately 20–35 millimetres (0.79–1.38 in) in size which is similar to other species in the genus, E. salmonis and E. brunnea. The texture of the colony is dry and fluffy due to the formation on aerial hyphae in mature colonies. The upper surface is grey to green black in colour while the reverse surface tends to be black.

Growth occurs on various media including malt extract agar (MA), oatmeal agar (OA), Sabourand's dextrose agar (SA), corn meal agar (CMA), Czapeck's solution agar, potato dextrose agar (PDA) and nutrient agar (NA). Optimal growth occurs on PDA and MA with the most aerial hyphae forming dome shaped colonies. Media interpreted to be associated with less optimal growth result in the formation of flat colonies. A distinguishing feature of this fungus from others in the genus is its ability to grow on L-arabinitol.

Ideal growth conditions for E. pisciphila occur between 20–30 °C (68–86 °F), where maximum growth occurs at 37 °C (99 °F). This differentiates it from E. jeanselmei which has similar physiology otherwise.

Reproduction for this species occurs asexually by conidiation which was observed to occur through various means in developing colonies. The conidia are produced either by (1) pre-existing conidia, (2) mature hyphae or (3) the differentiation of the cell into a specialized conidium-producing cell called an annellide. E. pisciphila have smooth-walled conidia with yellow-brown walls that characteristically differentiate into annelides. Annelides are bottle-shaped cells that give rise to conidia from a point at the tip of the bottle-neck, as it were. In this way, annelides are similar to phialides but differ in that their necks incrementally elongate as each successive conidium is borne. The cell walls of this species contain the brown pigment melanin which is both a pathogenicity factor and a mechanism of enhancing cell survival during periods of stress. The developing colonies also produce aerial hyphae that appear as hyphal strands that intertwine in a rope-like fashion. The formation of aerial hyphae has been suggested as a means of enhancing survival during harsh growth conditions. E. salmonis has single-celled conidia that are smaller than those of the otherwise morphologically the similar species, E. brunnea.

== Pathology ==
Unlike closely related species such as E. jeanselmei and E. dermatitidis, E. pisciphila rarely causes disease in humans primarily due to its inability to tolerate human body temperature. One case of human disease was reported in Brazil where a person undergoing immunosuppressive therapy for a liver transplant developed a skin infection. The infection did not disseminate and resolved with therapy within a month. Uncontrolled asthmatics may manifest hypersensitivity to E. pisciphila antigens. This fungus is pathogenic to an array of aquatic animals most notably freshwater and seawater fish in which infection is associated with the development of skin lesions and nodules on visceral organs. It can cause deadly infections in Atlantic salmon where the hyphae invade the brain causing chronic inflammation. These infections are associated with abnormal swimming behaviours, depression and darkening of skin. Non-salmonid fish such as smooth dogfish, channel catfish, American sole, Cardinal tetra, cod, triggerfish, Japanese flounder, King George whiting, American plaice are also susceptible. Systemic, lethal infections have been described in captive sharks including the zebra, bonnethead and hammerhead sharks. Infections of sharks, rays and skates are typically associated with severe tissue damage especially necrosis of the spleen and gills. Other cold-blooded animals such as turtles, crabs, sea horses and frogs can be affected. E. pisciphila has been implicated as a minor egg pathogen due to its ability to infect a small number of nematode larvae. Isolates have been identified from tongue ulcers of various terrestrial animals such as horses and dogs.

== Uses ==
E. pisciphila produces Exophilin A, a secondary metabolite identified as a new antibiotic against Gram-positive bacteria. Another secondary metabolite produced by this species is a newly discovered polyketide compound 1-(3,5-dihydroxyphenyl)-4-hydroxypentan-2-one which may have antimicrobial activity. A novel fungal metabolite, Exophilic acid, has been isolated which acts as an inhibitor of HIV-1 integrase, an enzyme critical for replication and spread of HIV virus. This demonstrates its potential to be used for antiretroviral therapy.
