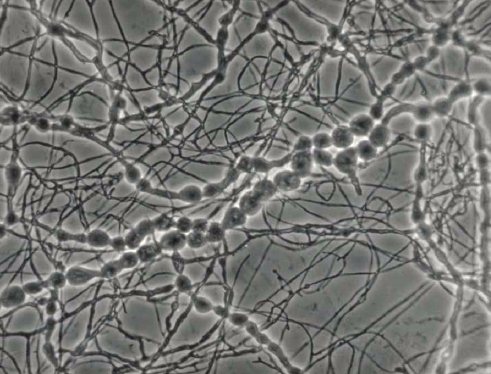

Scientific classification
- Kingdom: Fungi
- Division: Ascomycota
- Class: Sordariomycetes
- Order: Sordariales
- Family: incertae sedis
- Genus: Madurella
- Species: M. mycetomatis

Binomial name
- Madurella mycetomatis Brumpt (1905)

Synonyms
- Streptothrix mycetomi Laveran (1902); Glenospora khartoumensis Chalmerrs & Archibald (1902); Oospora tozeuri Nicolle & Pinoy (1908); Madurella tozeuri Pinoy (1919); M. tabarkae Blanc & Brun (1919); M. Americana Gammel (1926); M. ikedae Gammel (1927); M. Lackawanna Hanan & Zurett (1938); M. virido brunnea Redaelli & Ciferri (1942)

= Madurella mycetomatis =

Species of fungus

Madurella mycetomatis is a fungus primarily reported in Central Africa as a cause of mycetoma in humans. It has been misclassified for many years, but with the improvement of molecular techniques, its phylogenetic classification has been established. Many methods exist to identify M. mycetomatis, both in lesions and in culture. Histological examination is especially useful, as it has many unique morphological features. Strain-level differences in response to antifungal agents is informative for treatment and laboratory isolation of cultures.

== History ==
Madurella mycetomatis underwent many name changes. In 1901, Brumpt described the first recorded case of mycosis caused by M. mycetomatis, identifying black granules in association with mycetoma. In 1902, Laveran named the fungus Strepthothrix mycetomi, which he had identified from a mycetoma grain. In 1905, Brumpt corrected its genus to Madurella, in turn changing its name to Madurella mycetomii. The fungus was grown by Brault in 1912, so it could be studied in culture. In 1977, the British Medical Research Council changed the name to the currently accepted name, Madurella mycetomatis. With the binomial name determined, M. mycetomatis still remained incorrectly classified in the Pleosporales. This error was corrected in 2015 when M. mycetomatis was placed in the order Sordariales. Maduramycosis, or Madura foot, was first described from Madurai, South India, in 1842 by John Gill.

== Phylogeny ==
The genus Madurella contains only two well defined species: M. mycetomatis and M. grisea. Roughly a dozen other species of uncertain validity have been described as genus Madurella based on in vivo similarities and cultural sterility. Although similar, there were important physiological and morphological differences between the two well defined species, leading scientists to doubt their phylogeny. The development of ribosomal sequencing and other molecular techniques, led to the discovery that M. mycetomatis did not share a common ancestor with M. grisea and that M. mycetomatis belonged in the order Sordariales, further confirmed by genomic comparison against Chaetomium thermophilum, another member of the Sordariales.

Genotypic variation can help explain geographical distribution of fungi and differences in host symptoms. Restriction endonuclease assay (REA) and random amplification of polymorphic DNA (RAPD) helped characterize the different genotypes of M. mycetomatis, namely two genotypic clusters in Africa, and seven different genotypes from other continents. Further testing with amplified fragment length polymorphism (AFLP) found three clusters in Sudan, in contrast to the two clusters identified by RAPD, proving AFLP to be a more sensitive method. This showed that M. mycetomatis is not genetically homogenous, and explained the variability in host symptoms affected by the same etiological agent.

== Physiology and ecology ==
Madurella mycetomatis has been identified in both soil and anthill samples, growing optimally at 37 ˚C, however can viably grow at up to 40 ˚C. This ability to grow at high temperatures is a feature that can be useful in identifying the fungus in culture. The fungus's ability, an inability, to break down various molecules can also be used to confirm its identity. Madurella mycetomatis is amylolytic yet is only weakly proteolytic, and has the ability to assimilate glucose, galactose, lactose and maltose, while unable to assimilate sucrose. Potassium nitrate, ammonium sulfate, asparagine and urea can also be used by the fungus. Madurella mycetomatis produces 1,8-dihydroxynapthalene a precursor to melanin – a protein extracellularly attached to proteins. Both molecules are responsible for the characteristic dark grain color. The melanin produced by the fungus has also been identified as a defense mechanism against processes such as hydrolytic enzymes, free radicals, redox buffering, antibodies and complement. The fungus also produces pyomelanin, a brown diffusible pigment.

== Growth and morphology ==
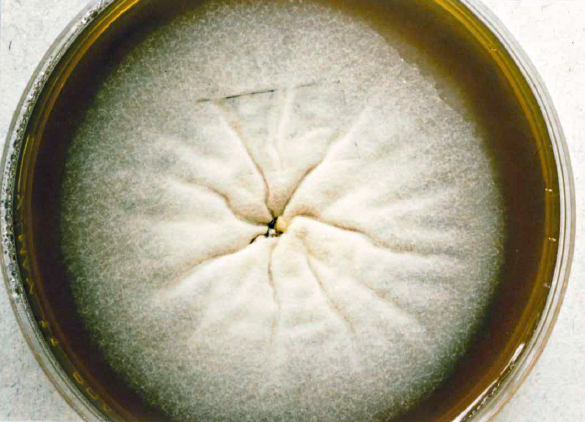
Colony of Madurella mycetomatis (UAMH 9528) on potato dextrose agar incubated for 12 days at 37 °C

The growth of M. mycetomatis is very slow and can be broken down into three stages. Initially the colony is dome shaped white-yellow or olivaceous brown in color. The mycelium is covered in grey down, giving it a woolly texture. Following the initial stage, brownish aerial mycelia (1 to 5 μm) form and the colony starts producing a diffusible pigment called pyomelanin, and becomes smooth in texture. Older colonies form masses of hyphae called sclerotia or grains. In nutritionally deficient or potato-carrot media, black grains (0.75 to 1 mm in diameter) with undifferentiated polygonal cells can be observed.

Grains of M. mycetomatis are hard and brittle, ranging between 0.5 and 1 mm (maximum being 2 mm), with masses from 2 to 4 mm. The grains are oval and often multi-lobed. They are reddish brown to black in color and texturally smooth or ridged. The grains are made up of an internal mass of hyphae, 2 to 5 μm in diameter, with terminal cells swelling from 12 – 15 μm (maximum being 30 μm) in diameter. Overall two main types of grains are observed. The most common type is compact or filamentous, where a dark brown cement like amorphous, electron rich substance fills the voids surrounding the hyphal network. The hyphal network differs in growth between the cortical and medullar region, with radial versus multidirectional growth respectively. When stained with hematoxylin and eosin it appears rust-brown in color. In contrast, the second type, vesicular, has a light colored medulla and a brown cortical region filled with hyphae and vesicles 6 to 14 μm in diameter. Often it is difficult to determine the transition point from cortex to medulla. Lesions can have both the filamentous and vesicular type grains at the same time.

Although conidiation, a form of asexual reproduction, in M. mycetomatis is rare, two main types can be described in-vitro. In the first type, oval to pyriform conidia, 3 to 5 μm can be observed. The conidia have truncated bases and are on the tips of simple or branched conidiophores. In-vitro, this type of conidiation can be observed in 50% of cultures on soil extract, hay infusion or water agar. When grown on potato carrot agar or cornmeal agar the second type of conidiation is observed. This type is characterized by small spherical conidia (3 μm in diameter) on tapered tips of flask shaped phialides and collarettes. On SDA media M. mycetomatis is sterile. No sexual stage has been identified for M. mycetomatis.

== Mycosis ==
Madurella mycetomatis is the most common fungus with respect to causing mycetoma in humans, a chronic localized inflammatory disease. Madurella mycetomatis accounts for 70% of mycetoma cases in central Africa, especially common in Sudan. Cases of mycetoma caused by this fungus have also been reported in West Africa, India, Venezuela, Curaçao, Brazil, Peru and Argentina. The mode of entry for etiological agents of mycetoma, such as M. mycetomatis, is trauma, such as; snake bites, knives, splinters, thorns and insect bites. Thus having identified M. mycetomatis in soil and anthill samples substantiates its involvement in mycetoma. Infected hosts from samples in Sudan show variability in clinical symptoms, this corroborates the heterogeneity of M. mycetomatis genotypes.

== Detection ==
There are various methods available for the purpose of differentiating fungal species. Histological examination allows for the exploitation of unique morphological features of M. mycetomatis, including but not limited to the unique cement like substance and multi-lobed morphology of the grains. Molecular analysis allows for a more sensitive technique to discriminate between morphologically similar species. An internal transcribed spacer (ITS) is amplified by polymerase chain reaction (PCR). Followed by restriction fragment length polymorphism (RFLP) digestion or gene sequencing to obtain the results. The highly variable nature of the ITS sequence between species not only allows for diagnosis, but also the identification of M. mycetomatis in soil samples. ITS has also been cited as the recommended method for isolation of M. mycetomatis. Additionally, molecular analysis lead to the determination that M. mycetomatis did not share a common ancestor with M. grisea, and belonged in the Sordariales class.

== Anti-fungal susceptibility ==
Understanding how a fungus might react to various anti-fungal agents in-vitro can be beneficial when wanting to study or isolate particular organisms in culture. The Clinical & Laboratory Standards Institute (CLSI) M38A methods indicate that conidial suspensions are to be used when testing anti-fungal susceptibility of filamentous fungi. When following these methods for M. mycetomatis, alternative suspensions of hyphal fragments are required, as conidial forms are exceedingly rare. Table 1 summarizes the minimal inhibitory concentrations at 90% (MIC_{90}) for various anti-fungal agents, with specific relation to M. mycetomatis.

In vitro susceptibility of Madurella mycetomatis to various drugs
Anti-fungal drug	MIC90 (μg/mL)	MIC50 (μg/mL)	MIC range (μg/mL)
Ketoconazole	0.25	0.06	≤0.031–1
Ravuconazole	0.016	0.004	≤0.002–0.031
Posaconazole	0.06	0.03	≤0.03–0.125
Terbinafine	16	8	1–>16
Voriconazole	0.125	–	0.016–1
Isavuconazole	0.063	0.031	≤0.016–0.125
Itraconazole	0.25	0.063	≤0.016–0.5

== See also ==
- Eumycetoma
