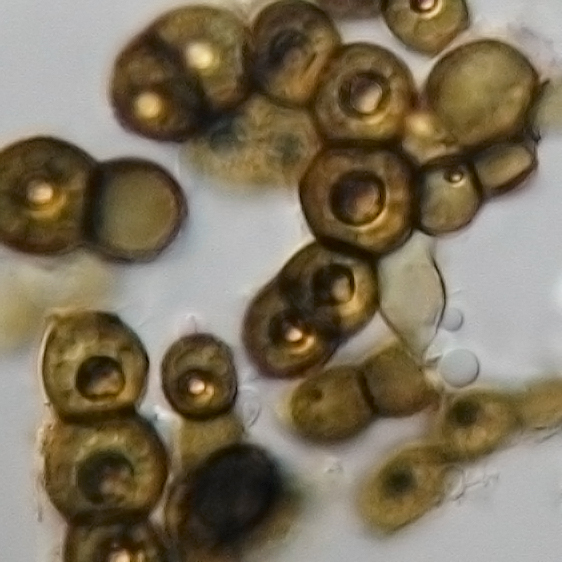

Scientific classification
- Kingdom: Fungi
- Division: Ascomycota
- Class: Eurotiomycetes
- Order: Chaetothyriales
- Family: Herpotrichiellaceae
- Genus: Exophiala
- Species: E. phaeomuriformis

Binomial name
- Exophiala phaeomuriformis Matos (2003)

Synonyms
- Sarcinomyces phaeomuriformis T. Matsumoto (1986)

= Exophiala phaeomuriformis =

Species of fungus

Exophiala phaeomuriformis is thermophilic fungus belonging to the genus Exophiala and the family Herpotrichiellaceae. it is a member of the group of fungi known as black yeasts, and is typically found in hot and humid locations, such as saunas, bathrooms, and dishwashers. This species can cause skin infections and is typically classified as a Biosafety Risk Group 2 agent.

== History ==
Exophiala phaeomuriformis is a member of the genus Exophiala, described in 1952 based on E. jeanselmei. Thirty species of Exophiala are currently recognized amongst which Exophiala (Wangiella) dermatitidis is the most common. When studying samples of E. dermatitidis, Tadahiko Matsumoto and colleagues observed strains with a granular colonial form and distinctive microscopic morphology. Based on the resemblance of these strains to the genus Sarcinomyces, they proposed the new name, S. phaeomuriformis. This taxon was transferred to the genus Exophiala by Tiago Matos and co-workers in 2003 because of its yeast-like morphology (rather than the meristematic form characteristic to members of the genus Sarcinomyces), and its closer DNA homology to the genus Exophiala.

Exophiala phaeomuriformis is a dematiaceous (darkly pigmented) fungus and member of the group of fungi known as the black yeasts. Black yeasts are an unrelated category of fungi that share yeast-like morphology and possess darkly melanized cell walls. Although their DNA sequences are distinctive, E. phaeomuriformis and E. dermatitidis are so closely related that the two cannot be reliably differentiated morphologically or physiologically. Antigenic cross-reactivity suggests that E. phaeomuriformis may have originated as multicellular variant of E. dematitidis.

== Growth and morphology ==
Like many other black yeasts, Exophiala phaeomuriformis is known only by its asexual form and no sexual form has been found. It is a thermophilic fungus preferring temperatures between 37–42 °C (99–108 °F) but growing at any temperature between 15–42 °C (59–108 °F). Exophilala phaeomuriformis is more sensitive than other black yeasts to salt, incapable of growth at concentrations of sodium chloride exceeding 17%. Like other members of the genus Exophiala, it is able to tolerate a wide range of pH (2.5–12.5).

Colonies of E. phaeomuriformis are hyaline, mycoid, and smooth when young but become black, dry, crumbly, raised, and mulberry-like in texture with age. Some strains fail to undergo this morphological switch and remain yeast-like in age. By contrast, many strains of E. dermatitidis become mycelial with age. Hyphal growth has not been observed in E. phaeomuriformis. Instead, colonies develop from loosely packed, single, and rounded budding yeast cells that are either scattered or aggregated in groups. Vegetative cells can either be unicellular or muriform (septate in all planes) or become divided by transverse septa only. Yeast cells are thick-walled and spherical or near-spherical in shape. Budding cells can have broad bases, occur in chains, and be multilateral, budding in different directions.

== Physiology ==
Like other member of the genus Exophiala, E. phaeomuriformis is saprotrophic, obtaining its energy exclusively from non-living organic materials. When inoculated on a suitable growth medium under optimal conditions, the growth of E. phaeomuriformis is initiated in roughly 3 days; however, when subject to competition, the cells may remain in a stationary state for many weeks prior to the development of visible growth. Similar to E. dematitidis, E. phaeomuriformis is unable to assimilate nitrate, nitrite and melibiose; however it differs in it that some strains are unable to metabolize D-gluconate, D-glucuronate, D-galacturonate and glucono-δ-lactone.

== Habitat and ecology ==
Exophiala phaeomuriformis has a proclivity for environments rich in mono- and polyaromatic compounds, such as hydrocarbons, where it uses these compounds as sources of energy. The species is plurivorous, occurring on a wide range of materials from contaminated soils and toluene rich environments to wild berries and animal feces. It is also found in environments containing the preservative creosote, such as railroad ties where it is an important agent of biodeterioration. In indoor environments, E. phaeomuriformis occurs in warm and moist environments such as toilets, saunas, or dishwashers. This species is found world-wide.

== Human disease ==
Exophiala phaeomuriformis is a rare causative agent of phaeohyphomycosis in cutaneous, subcutaneous and deep tissues, and is responsible for 6.4% of infections caused by black yeasts. Infection usually occurs following skin abrasion or penetrating injuries. Exophiala phaeomuriformis can also cause corneal infection following eye exposure to contaminated water. People with cystic fibrosis (CF) are considered abnormally susceptible to Exophiala infections, including E. phaeomuriformis. It has been suggested that differences in the microbiota profiles of CF patients may be responsible for this predisposition. Treatment of E. phaeomuriformis involves a combination of surgical debridement and antifungal therapy. A range of antifungal agents including caspofungin, voriconazole, itraconazole, posaconazole, and amphotericin B are active against this species. Due to its pathogenic potential, E. phaeomuriformis is regarded as a Biosafety Risk Group 2 agent in the laboratory.
