= C22H17F2N5OS =

The molecular formula C_{22}H_{17}F_{2}N_{5}OS (molar mass: 437.465 g/mol, exact mass: 437.1122 u) may refer to:

- Isavuconazonium
- Ravuconazole
