= Actinomycetoma =

Bacterial infection of the skin

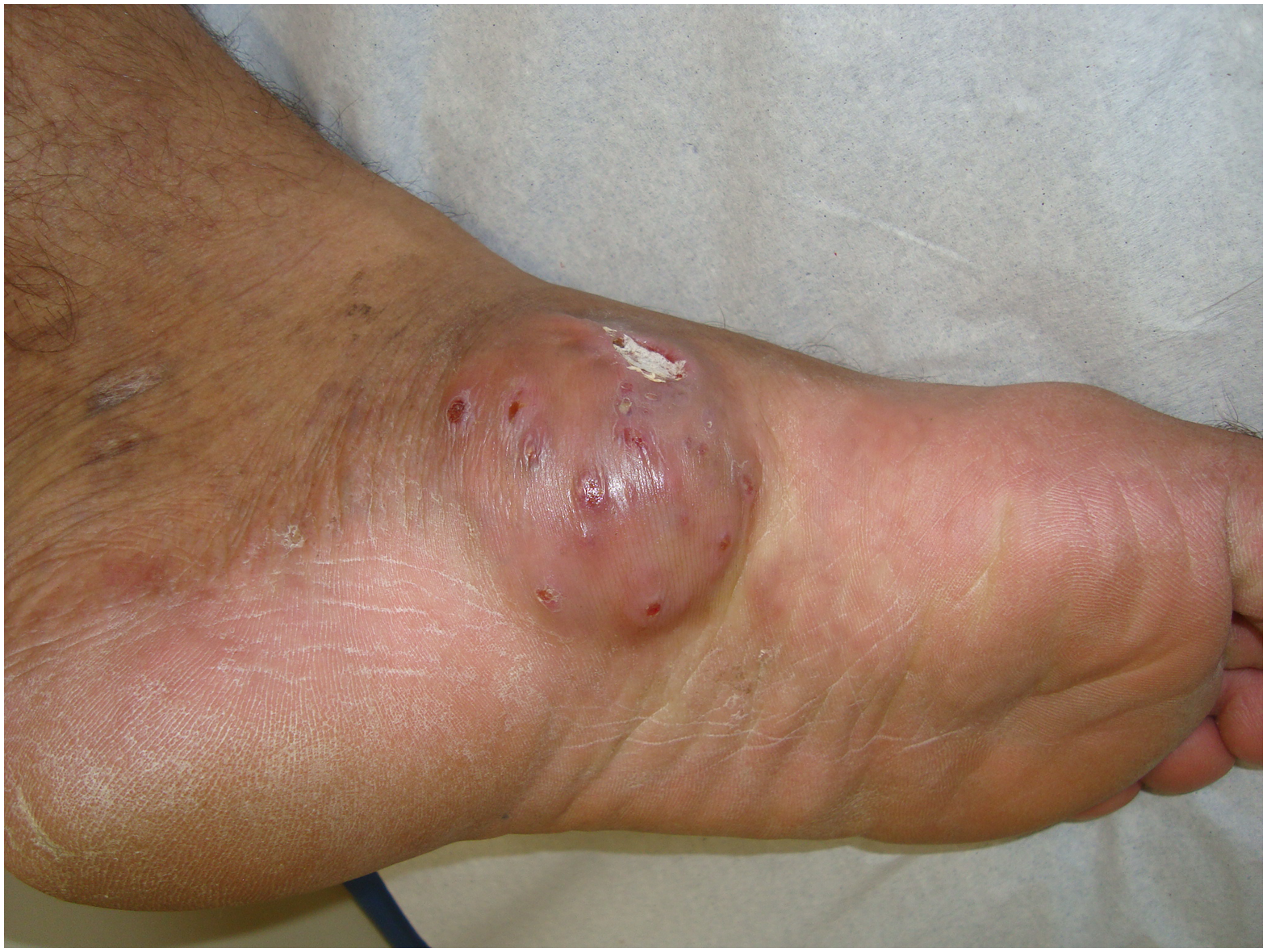
- HIV patient with actinomycetoma before treatment
- Specialty: Dermatology, Infectious diseases

Actinomycetoma is a chronic bacterial subcutaneous infection caused by aerobic actinomycetes that affect the skin and connective tissue . Its clinical features are firm tumefaction of the affected site and the presence of abscesses, nodules, and sinuses that drain a seropurulent exudate containing granules characteristic of the disease, formed by the causative agent and defensive response cells of the host. The disease is caused by inoculation of the infectious agent through minor trauma in susceptible individuals.

Actinomycetoma is caused by members of the order Actinomycetales, particularly Nocardia brasiliensis, Actinomadura madurae, Streptomyces somaliensis, and Actinomadura pelletieri. However, some cases have also been reported due to Actinomadura latina and other Nocardia species such as: Nocardia aobensis, Nocardia farcinica, Nocardia harenae, Nocardia otitidiscaviarum, Nocardia mexicana, Nocardia transvalensis, Nocardia veterana, Nocardiopsis yamanashiensis, and Nocardia dassonvillei and other actinobacteria such as Cellulosimicrobium cellulans.

It is, therefore, a form of actinomycosis. Mycetoma is a broad term which includes actinomycetoma and eumycetoma under it. However, eumycetoma is caused by fungal infection in contrast to actinomycetoma that is caused by mostly anaerobic bacteria.
