= Eumycetoma =

Human and animal fungal infection

- Other names: Madura foot
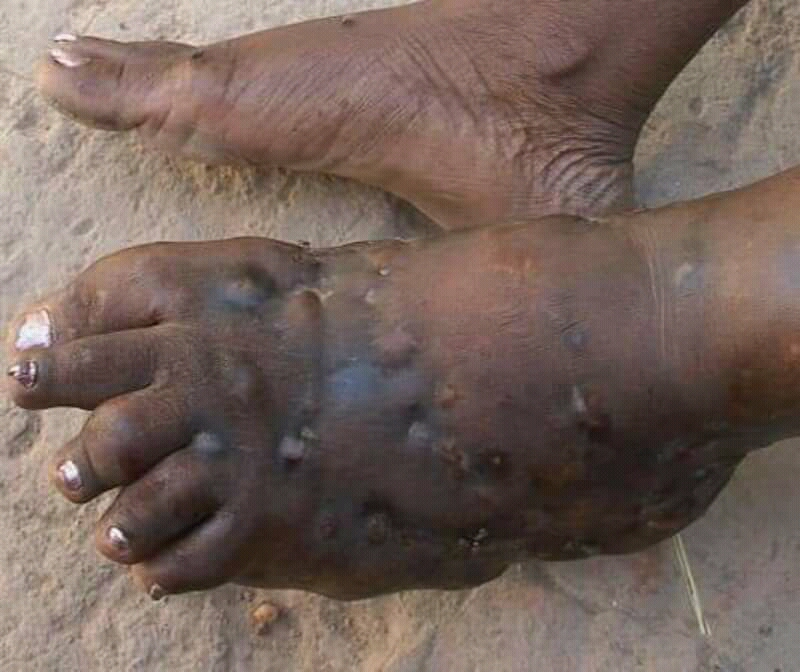
- An infected foot
- Specialty: Infectious disease
- Symptoms: Swelling, weeping pus filled sinuses, deformity.
- Complications: Amputation, potentially fatal secondary infections
- Causes: Many different species of fungi such as: Madurella spp., Falciformispora senegalensis, Curvularia lunata, Pseudallescheria spp., Neotestudina spp., Acremonium spp., Scedosporium spp. and Fusarium spp.
- Diagnostic method: Microscopy, biopsy, culture, medical imaging, ELISA, immunodiffusion, Fungal DNA barcoding
- Differential diagnosis: Actinomycosis (Actinomycetoma)
- Treatment: Surgical debridement, antifungal medicines
- Medication: Itraconazole, posaconazole, voriconazole
- Prognosis: Recurrence is common
- Frequency: Endemic in Africa, India and South America

Eumycetoma, also known as Madura foot, is a persistent fungal infection of the skin and the tissues just under the skin, affecting most commonly the feet, although it can occur within other body parts. It starts as a painless wet nodule, which may be present for years before ulceration, swelling, bone degradation, and grainy discharge from sinuses and fistulae set in.

Many different species of fungi can cause eumycetoma, some examples include: Madurella mycetomatis, Falciformispora senegalensis, Curvularia lunata, Scedosporium species, Acremonium and Fusarium species. Diagnosis is normally done by histopathology and culture. Medical imaging may reveal extent of bone involvement. Other tests include ELISA, immunodiffusion, and Fungal DNA barcoding

Treatment includes surgical removal of affected tissue and antifungal medicines. After treatment, recurrence is common. Sometimes limb amputation is required.

The infection occurs generally in the tropics, and is endemic in Sub-Saharan Africa, especially Sudan, India, parts of South America and Mexico. Few cases have been reported across North Africa. Mycetoma is probably low-endemic to Egypt with predilection for eumycetoma. In 2016, the World Health Organization recognised eumycetoma as a neglected tropical disease.

== Signs and symptoms ==
The initial lesion is a small swelling under the skin following minor penetrating trauma (e.g. stepping on broken glass) It appears as a painless wet nodule, which may be present for years before ulceration, swelling and weeping from sinuses, followed by bone deformity. The sinuses discharge a grainy liquid of fungal colonies. These grains are usually black or white. Destruction of deeper tissues, and deformity and loss of function in the affected limbs may occur in later stages. It tends to occur in one foot. Mycetoma due to bacteria has similar clinical features.

== Causes ==
Eumycetoma is a type of mycetoma caused by fungi, distinct from mycetoma caused by bacteria from the phylum Actinomycetes; both have similar clinical features.

The most common fungi causing white discharge is Scedosporium (ex. Pseudoalleschia) boydii. Other causative agents of non-black grain eumycetoma include Acremonium and Fusarium species.

Black discharge tends to be caused by species from the genera Madurella, Pyrenochaeta, Exophiala, Leptosphaeria and Curvularia. The most common species are Madurella mycetomatis and Trematospheria grisea (previously called Madurella grisea).

Other fungal causative agents include:

- Acremonium falciform
- Acremonium kiliense
- Acremonium recifei
- Aspergillus flavus
- Aspergillus nidulans
- Cladophialophora bantiana
- Cladophialophora mycetomatis
- Curvularia geniculata
- Curvularia lunata
- Cylindrocarpon cyanescens
- Exophiala jeanselmei
- Falciformispora senegalensis
- Fusarium moniliforme
- Fusarium solani
- Glenospora clapieri
- Leptosphaeria senegalensis
- Leptosphaeria tompkinsii
- Madurella grisea
- Madurella mycetomatis
- Microsporum audouinii
- Microsporum canis
- Neotestudina rosatii
- Phaeoacremonium parasiticum
- Phialophora cyanescens
- Phialophora verrucosa
- Scedosporium (ex. Pseudoalleschia) boydii
- Pyrenochaeta mackinonii
- Megasporoporia setulosa (a tropical species of mushroom)
- Pyrenochaeta romeroi
- Trichophyton rubrum
- Zopfia rosatii

== Mechanism ==
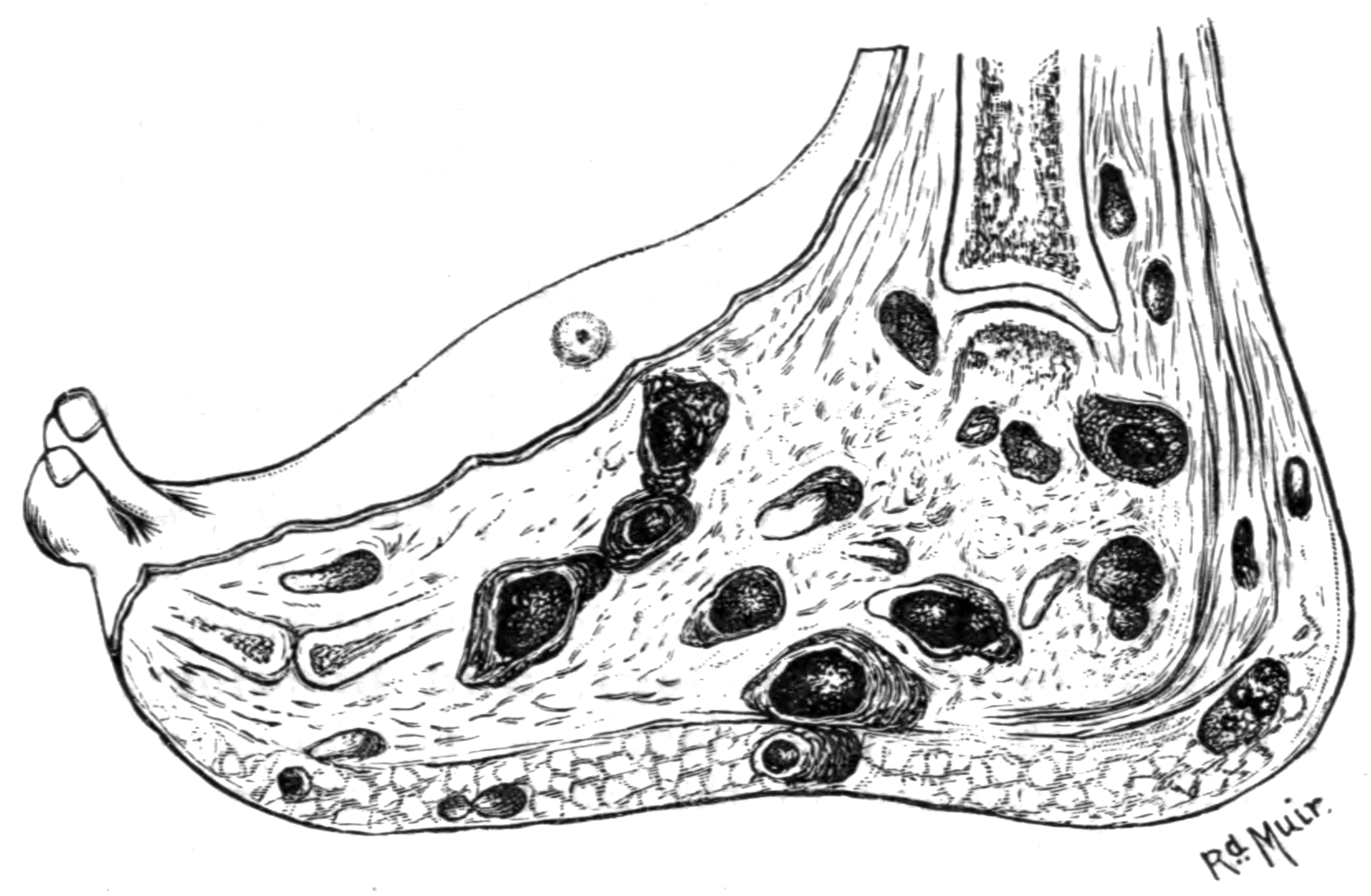
Madura foot section

The disease is acquired by entry of the fungal spores from the soil through a breach in the skin produced by minor trauma like a thorn prick. The disease then spreads to deeper tissues and also forms sinus tracts leading to skin surface. Mature lesions are characterised by a grainy discharge from these sinuses. These discharges contain fungal colonies and are infective. Spread of infection internally through blood or lymph is uncommon.

Infections that produce a black discharge mainly spread subcutaneously. In the red and yellow varieties deep spread occurs early, infiltrating muscles and bones but sparing nerves and tendons, which are highly resistant to the invasion.

Botryomycosis, also known as bacterial pseudomycosis, produces a similar clinical picture and is caused usually by Staphylococcus aureus. Other bacteria may also cause botryomycosis.

== Diagnosis ==
Diagnosis is by biopsy, visualising the fungi under the microscope and culture, which show characteristic fungal filaments and vesicles characteristic of the fungi. Other tests include ELISA, immunodiffusion, and PCR with DNA sequencing (so-called DNA barcoding).

X rays and ultrasonography may be carried out to assess the extent of the disease. X rays findings are extremely variable. The disease is most often observed at an advanced stage that exhibits extensive destruction of all bones of the foot. Rarely, a single lesion may be seen in the tibia where the picture is identical with chronic osteomyelitis. Cytology of fine needle aspirate or pus from the lesion, and tissue biopsy may be undertaken sometimes. Some publications have claimed a "dot in a circle sign" as a characteristic MRI feature for this condition (this feature has also been described on ultrasound).

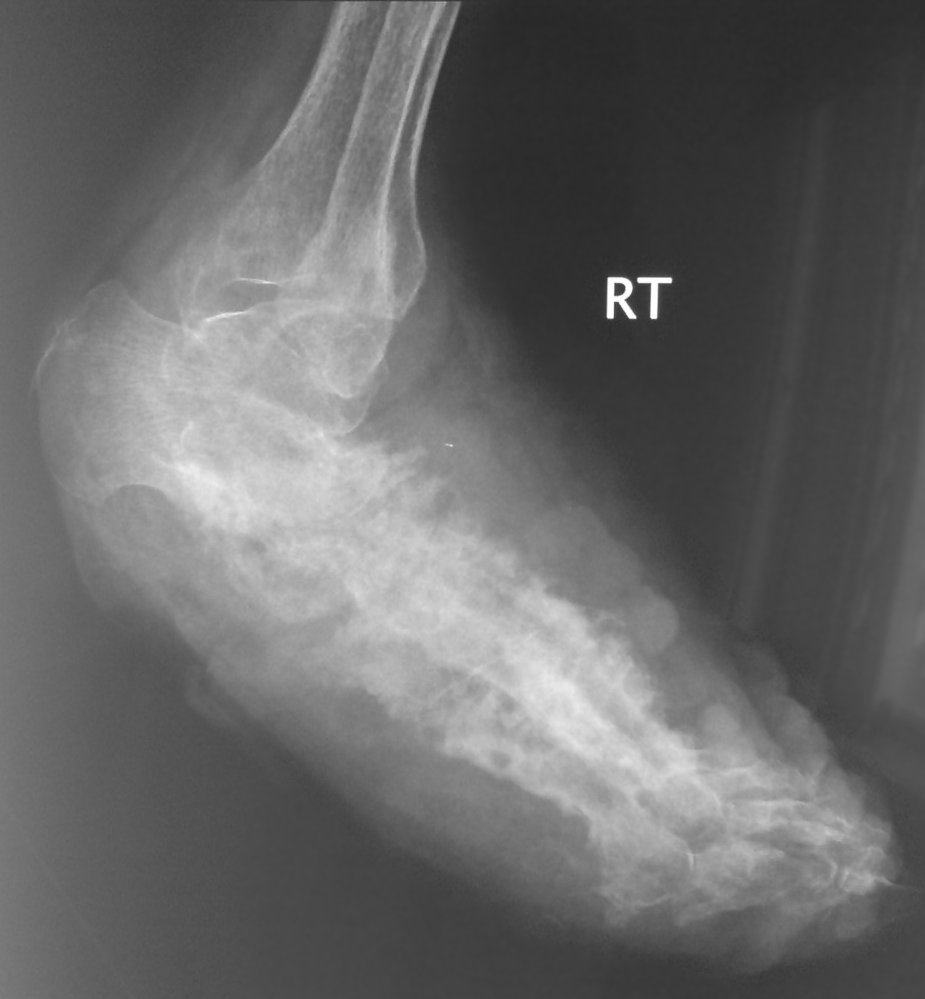
X-ray of Madura foot

=== Differential diagnosis ===
The following clinical conditions may be considered before diagnosing a patient with mycetoma:

1. Tuberculous ulcer
2. Kaposi's sarcoma, a vascular tumour of skin usually seen in AIDS.
3. Leprosy
4. Syphilis
5. Malignant neoplasm
6. Tropical ulcer
7. Botryomycosis, a skin infection usually caused by the bacterium Staphylococcus aureus.

== Prevention ==
No vaccine is available. Simple hygienic precautions like wearing shoes or sandals while working in fields, and washing hands and feet at regular intervals, may help prevent the disease.

== Treatment ==
Surgery combined with itraconazole may be given for up to year when the grains are black. Posaconazole is another option. Voriconazole can be used for infections caused by Fusarium species.

Ketoconazole has been used to treat eumycetoma but has many side effects. Actinomycetes usually respond well to medical treatment, but eukaryotic infections are generally resistant and may require surgical interventions including salvage procedures as bone resection or even the more radical amputation.

Oral fosravuconazole, which is much cheaper than itraconazole, an important factor as eumycetoma mainly affects young adults in poorer, rural areas, was found in 2023 in Phase II clinical trials to be safe, patient-friendly, and effective in treating eumycetoma.

== Epidemiology ==
The disease is more common in males aged 20–40 years who work as labourers, farmers and herders, and in travellers to tropical regions, where the condition is endemic.

== History ==
Madura foot or maduromycosis or maduramycosis is described in ancient writings of India as Padavalmika, which, translated means Foot anthill. The first modern description of Madura foot was made in 1842 from Madurai (the city after which the disease was named Madura-mycosis) in India, by Gill. The fungal cause of the disease was established in 1860 by Carter.

== Society and culture ==
In 2016, the World Health Organization recognised eumycetoma as a neglected tropical disease. Traditionally occurring in regions where resources are scarce, medicines may be expensive and diagnosis is frequently made late, when more invasive treatment may be required.
