= Ulospora =

Scientific classification
- Kingdom: Fungi
- Division: Ascomycota
- Class: Dothideomycetes
- Order: Pleosporales
- Family: Testudinaceae
- Genus: Ulospora; D. Hawksw., Malloch & Sivan.

Type species
- Ulospora bilgramii (D. Hawksw., C. Booth & Morgan-Jones) D. Hawksw., Malloch & Sivan.

Genus of fungi

Ulospora is a genus of fungi in the family Testudinaceae. This is a monotypic genus, containing the single species Ulospora bilgramii.
