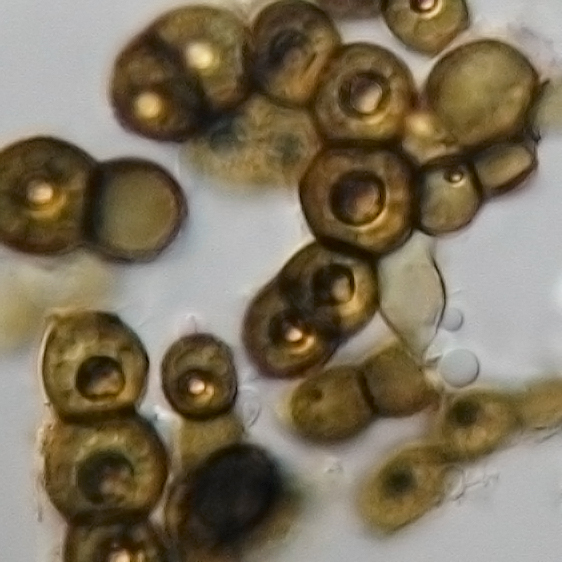
- Exophiala phaeomuriformis

Scientific classification
- Kingdom: Fungi
- Division: Ascomycota
- Class: Eurotiomycetes
- Order: Chaetothyriales
- Family: Herpotrichiellaceae
- Genus: Exophiala; J.W.Carmich. (1966)

Type species
- Exophiala salmonis J.W.Carmich. (1966)

Synonyms
- Foxia Castell. (1908); Wangiella McGinnis (1977)

= Exophiala =

Genus of fungi

Exophiala is a genus of anamorphic fungi in the Herpotrichiellaceae family. The widespread genus was said to contain 28 species in a 2008 publication. There are now 91 current names listed on Index Fungorum. The genus was formally described by J. W. Carmichael in 1966.

Exophiala has been implicated in causing 'saxophone lung' or hypersensitivity pneumonitis, a disease that can be contracted by woodwind instrumentalists (saxophonists, clarinettists, oboists, etc.). A case study presented at the annual meeting of the American College of Allergy, Asthma and Immunology highlighted that it is possible to develop this allergic pulmonary disease through improper cleaning of instruments.

Exophiala werneckii is the organism responsible for tinea nigra.

Some sources equate Hortaea werneckii, Cladosporium werneckii, Exophiala werneckii, and Phaeoannellomyces werneckii.

Exophiala jeanselmei causes maduromycosis. This is usually an asymptomatic disease with black or brown macular lesions which enlarge by peripheral extension. The lesion is darkest at the periphery and has very distinct margins. Lab diagnosis- using a KOH mount. Typically seen are brown septate branching hyphae or dark brown budding cells. Treatment is topical antifungal: miconazole or econazole.

There are also species of Exophiala that are dark septate endophytes, a type of fungus that grows in association with plant roots. Studies with both Exophiala salmonis and Exophiala pisciphila have found beneficial effects of innoculation with the fungus on plant health when grown under heavy metal stress.

== Species ==
- Exophiala alcalophila
- Exophiala angulospora
- Exophiala attenuata
- Exophiala calicioides
- Exophiala castellanii
- Exophiala dermatitidis
- Exophiala dopicola
- Exophiala exophialae
- Exophiala heteromorpha
- Exophiala hongkongensis
- Exophiala jeanselmei
- Exophiala lecanii-corni
- Exophiala mansonii
- Exophiala mesophila
- Exophiala moniliae
- Exophiala negronii
- Exophiala phaeomuriformis
- Exophiala pisciphila
- Exophiala psychrophila
- Exophiala salmonis
- Exophiala spinifera
- Exophiala viscosa
- Exophiala werneckii
