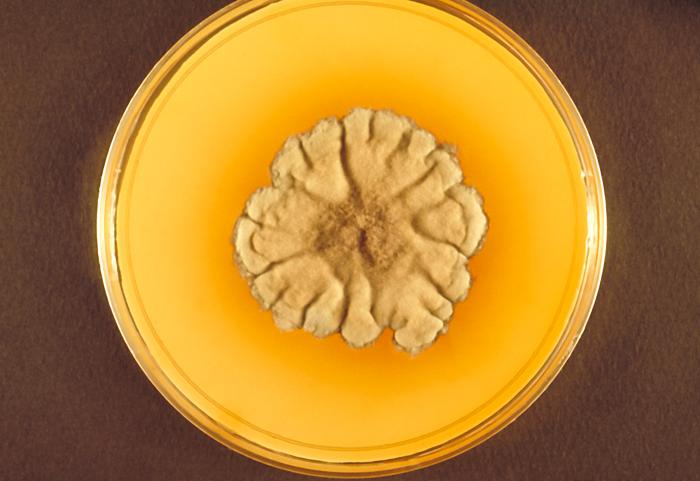
- Madurella grisea on agar plate

Scientific classification
- Kingdom: Fungi
- Division: Ascomycota
- Class: Sordariomycetes
- Order: Sordariales
- Family: incertae sedis
- Genus: Madurella; M.E. Brumpt, 1905

Species
- (see text)

Synonyms
- Indiella Brumpt, 1906; Rubromadurella R. Talice, 1935

= Madurella =

Genus of fungi

Madurella is a fungal genus of uncertain position in the Sordariales, and sometimes classified as Mitosporic Ascomycota.

It includes the following species:

- Madurella algiris C. W. Dodge, 1935
- Madurella americana Gammel, 1927
- Madurella bouffardii Vuill, 1931
- Madurella brumptii Cif. & Redaelli, 1941
- Madurella clapieri Cif. & Redaelli, 1941
- Madurella grisea Abd. Ahmed et al., 2014
- Madurella fahalii de Hoog et al., 2012
- Madurella ikedae Gemmel, 1927
- Madurella lackawanna Hanan, 1938
- Madurella langeronii Cif. & Redaelli, 1941
- Madurella mansonii Vuill, 1931
- Madurella mycetomatis Brumpt, 1905
- Madurella oswaldoi Horta, 1919
- Madurella ramiroi Pirajá, 1918
- Madurella reynieri Vuill, 1931
- Madurella tropicana de Hoog et al., 2012

Madurella mycetomatis is a main cause of eumycetoma, an infection of human extremities and rarely the nervous system, in arid regions of east Africa and Asia. The origin is soil and its dark agar colonies are often sterile, although sclerotia are often produced, and short chains of 1-celled conidia sometimes occur. A molecular assay distinguishes the four species based on rolling circle amplification of the internal transcribed spacer of the ribosomal DNA (ITS).
