= Testudina =

Scientific classification
- Kingdom: Fungi
- Division: Ascomycota
- Class: Dothideomycetes
- Order: Tubeufiales
- Family: Tubeufiaceae
- Genus: Testudina; Bizz.

Type species
- Testudina terrestris Bizz.

Genus of fungi

Testudina is a genus of fungi in the family Testudinaceae. This is a monotypic genus, containing the single species Testudina terrestris.
