= Fosravuconazole =

Chemical compound

Clinical data
- Trade names: Nailin
- Other names: BMS-379224; BFE-1224; E-1224
- ATC code: D01BA03 (WHO)

Legal status
- Legal status: In general: ℞ (Prescription only)

Identifiers
- IUPAC name: [(2R,3R)-3-[4-(4-Cyanophenyl)-1,3-thiazol-2-yl]-2-(2,4-difluorophenyl)-1-(1,2,4-triazol-1-yl)butan-2-yl]oxymethyl dihydrogen phosphate
- CAS Number: 351227-64-0
- PubChem CID: 9807507
- DrugBank: DB15204
- ChemSpider: 7983266
- UNII: L4Q6O5430L
- KEGG: D10762
- ChEBI: CHEBI:34549
- ChEMBL: ChEMBL333325
- CompTox Dashboard (EPA): DTXSID70188627

Chemical and physical data
- Formula: C_{23}H_{20}F_{2}N_{5}O_{5}PS
- Molar mass: 547.47 g·mol^{−1}
- 3D model (JSmol): Interactive image
- SMILES: C[C@@H](c1nc(-c2ccc(C#N)cc2)cs1)[C@@](Cn1cncn1)(OCOP(=O)(O)O)c1ccc(F)cc1F
- InChI: InChI=1S/C23H20F2N5O5PS/c1-15(22-29-21(10-37-22)17-4-2-16(9-26)3-5-17)23(11-30-13-27-12-28-30,34-14-35-36(31,32)33)19-7-6-18(24)8-20(19)25/h2-8,10,12-13,15H,11,14H2,1H3,(H2,31,32,33)/t15-,23+/m0/s1; Key:SYTNEMZCCLUTNX-NPMXOYFQSA-N

Fosravuconazole (trade name Nailin) is a triazole antifungal agent. In Japan, it is approved for the treatment of onychomycosis, a fungal infection of the nail. It is a prodrug that is converted into ravuconazole.

Drugs for Neglected Diseases Initiative (DNDi) and the Japanese pharmaceutical company Eisai found that fosravuconazole works as a treatment for mycetoma, a serious condition. The Phase II clinical trial found that oral fosravuconazole was safe, patient-friendly, and effective in treating eumycetoma. Eumycetoma mainly affects young adults in poorer, rural areas; the standard treatment is itraconazole, which is much more expensive at about US$2,000 for a year than fosravuconazole and unaffordable, and not available in all endemic countries.
