= Otto Bollinger =

German pathologist (1843–1909)

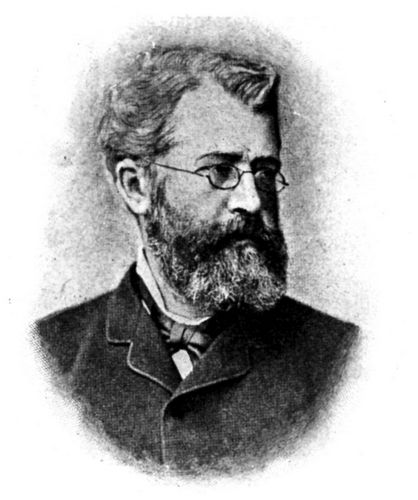
Otto Bollinger (1843-1909)

Otto Bollinger (2 April 1843 – 13 August 1909) was a German pathologist born in Altenkirchen, Kusel, Rhineland-Palatinate.

In 1868, he obtained his doctorate at the Friedrich Wilhelm University of Berlin and two years later received his habilitation. He taught classes at the Tierärtzliche Hochschule in Zürich and in 1874 became an associate professor at the Tierarzneischule in Munich. In 1880, he succeeded Ludwig von Buhl (1816-1880) as professor of general pathology and pathological anatomy at the Ludwig-Maximilians-Universität München.

Bollinger had an extensive background in veterinary medicine and was known for his studies of rabies in the days before the discovery of an anti-rabies vaccine.

In 1877, he described the etiologic agent of bovine actinomycosis ("lumpy jaw"), an organism that is now referred to as Actinomyces bovis. He is credited with describing the inclusion bodies found in tissue cells in fowlpox. These bodies contain the fowlpox virus and are now referred to as Bollinger bodies. His name is also associated with "Bollinger granules", defined as small yellowish-white granules that cluster, contain micrococci, and are seen in the granulation tissue of botryomycosis.

In 1891, Bollinger provided an early description of a delayed traumatic apoplexy he called "traumatische Spät-Apoplexie". Today, this condition is called "delayed traumatic intracerebral hematoma" or (DTICH). His research was based on four patients who suffered a head injury, in which death occurred days to weeks later from an apoplectic event.
