= Lepidosphaeria =

Scientific classification
- Kingdom: Fungi
- Division: Ascomycota
- Class: Dothideomycetes
- Order: Pleosporales
- Family: Testudinaceae
- Genus: Lepidosphaeria; Parg.-Leduc

Type species
- Lepidosphaeria nicotiae Parg.-Leduc

Genus of fungi

Lepidosphaeria is a genus of fungi in the family Testudinaceae. This is a monotypic genus, containing the single species Lepidosphaeria nicotiae.
