= Testudinaceae =

Scientific classification
- Kingdom: Fungi
- Division: Ascomycota
- Class: Dothideomycetes
- Order: Pleosporales
- Family: Testudinaceae; Arx (1971)

Genera
- Lepidosphaeria; Neotestudina; Testudina; Ulospora

Family of fungi

The Testudinaceae are a family of fungi in the order Pleosporales. Taxa have a widespread distribution, especially in xeric habitats, and are mostly saprobic.
