= Neotestudina =

Scientific classification
- Kingdom: Fungi
- Division: Ascomycota
- Class: Dothideomycetes
- Order: Pleosporales
- Family: Testudinaceae
- Genus: Neotestudina; Segretain & Destombes

Type species
- Neotestudina rosatii Segretain & Destombes

Genus of fungi

Neotestudina is a genus of fungi in the family Testudinaceae.
