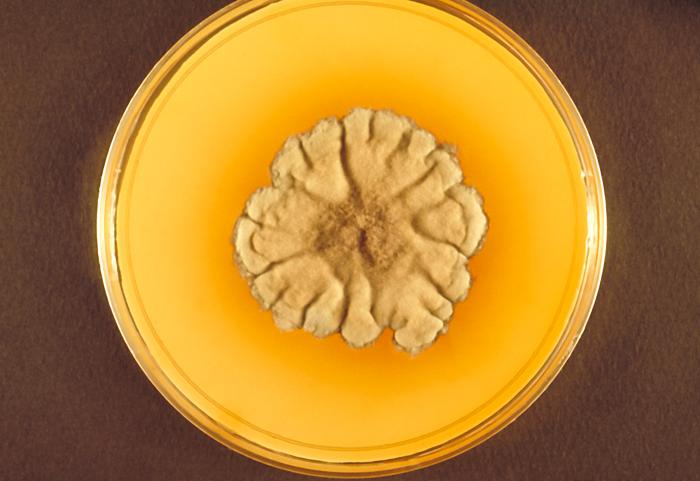

Scientific classification
- Kingdom: Fungi
- Division: Ascomycota
- Class: Sordariomycetes
- Order: Sordariales
- Family: incertae sedis
- Genus: Madurella
- Species: M. grisea

Binomial name
- Madurella grisea J.E. Mackinnon, Ferrada & Montem.

= Madurella grisea =

Species of human pathogenic fungus

Madurella grisea is a fungal species of the genus Madurella. Madurella species are the most common pathogens associated with eumycetoma.

== Laboratory characteristics ==
Colonies of Madurella grisea are slow growing, dark, leathery, and folded with radial grooves and with a light brown to greyish surface mycelium. With age, colonies become dark- to reddish-brown and acquire a brownish-black reverse. Microscopically, cultures are sterile, although hyphae of two widths have been described: thin at 1 to 3 um in width, and broad at 3 to 5 um in width. The optimum temperature of growth for M. grisea is 30C, it does not grow at 37C. RG-2 organism.

Grains of Madurella grisea (tissue microcolonies) are black, round to lobed, soft to firm, up to 1.0 mm, with two distinctive zones, a hyaline to weakly pigmented central zone and a deeply pigmented periphery.

M. grisea can be distinguished from Madurella mycetomatis by the inability to grow at 37C or assimilate lactose.

MIC data for Madurella grisea is limited. Antifungal susceptibility testing of individual strains is recommended.

Antifungal MIC ug/mL Antifungal MIC ug/mL Antifungal MIC ug/mL Range Range Range Amphotericin B 0.25 Itraconazole 0.5 Voriconazole 0.5

== Clinical significance ==
Both M. mycetomatis and M. grisea have been isolated from soil and are some of the major causative agents of mycetoma.
