= Falciformispora =

Scientific classification
- Kingdom: Fungi
- Division: Ascomycota
- Class: Dothideomycetes
- Order: Pleosporales
- Family: Pleosporaceae
- Genus: Falciformispora; K.D. Hyde

Type species
- Falciformispora lignatilis K.D. Hyde

Genus of fungi

Falciformispora is a genus of fungi in the family Pleosporaceae. This is a monotypic genus, containing the single species Falciformispora lignatilis.
