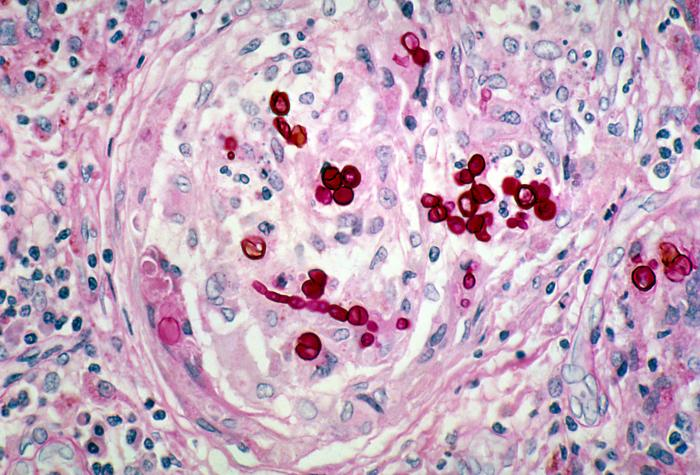
- histopathologic changes in phaeohyphomycosis due to Exophiala dermatitidis, formerly Wangiella dermatitidis using PAS stain

Scientific classification
- Kingdom: Fungi
- Division: Ascomycota
- Class: Eurotiomycetes
- Order: Chaetothyriales
- Family: Herpotrichiellaceae
- Genus: Exophiala
- Species: E. dermatitidis

Binomial name
- Exophiala dermatitidis (Kano) de Hoog (1977)

Synonyms
- Hormiscium dermatitidis Kano (1934); Fonsecaea dermatitidis (Kano) Carrion (1950); Hormodendrum dermatitidis (Kano) Conant (1954); Phialophora dermatitidis (Kano) C.W.Emmons (1963); Rhinocladiella dermatitidis Schol-Schwarz (1968); Wangiella dermatitidis (Kano) McGinnis (1977)

= Exophiala dermatitidis =

Species of fungus

Exophiala dermatitidis is a thermophilic black yeast, and a member of the Herpotrichiellaceae. While the species is only found at low abundance in nature, metabolically active strains are commonly isolated in saunas, steam baths, and dish washers. Exophiala dermatitidis only rarely causes infection in humans, however cases have been reported around the world. In East Asia, the species has caused lethal brain infections in young and otherwise healthy individuals. The fungus has been known to cause cutaneous and subcutaneous phaeohyphomycosis, and as a lung colonist in people with cystic fibrosis in Europe. In 2002, an outbreak of systemic E. dermatitidis infection occurred in women who had received contaminated steroid injections at North Carolina hospitals.

== Appearance and general description ==
Exophiala dermatitidis forms slow growing, brown or black colonies. As is common amongst black yeasts, E. dermatitidis is an anamorphic fungus with multiple conidial forms. This morphological plasticity has complicated taxonomic determination based solely on physical appearance. Young colonies are described as waxy, mucoid, smooth, and yeastlike. Over time pigmented aerial hyphae develop, and older colonies are described as appearing filamentous and velvety. Conidia are between globular and elliptical in shape, and form at the mouth of short annellidic conidiogenous cells. Annellations can only be observed by electron microscopy. Prior to analysis by scanning electron microscope, the conidiogenous cells were observed to form from non-annelated phialides and phialides without collarettes. These observations caused the species to be erroneously provided with its own monotypic genus, Wangiella. The species name Wangiella dermatitidis is still commonly used in the scientific literature.

The black fungus also takes on diverse morphologies in vivo. Infected tissues contain mixtures of ovoid yeast-like cells, short septate hyphae that may be branched or unbranched, toruloid hyphae, as well as isotopically enlarged sclerotic (muriform-like) cells that resemble those found in chromoblastomycosis. The muriform-like cells isolated from E. dermatitidis infections have thinner walls than those found in chromoblastomycosis, and cells are divided along a single plane.

A sexual form of E. dermatitidis has not been observed. However, the occurrence of two mating type idiomorphs in approximately equal numbers among clinical and environmental isolates suggests that E. dermatitidis reproduces sexually. Sequencing of rDNA has shown that clinical isolates of E. dermatitidis are very closely related to Capronia mansonii, and It has been predicted that the ascospores and ascomata of an E. dermatitidis teleomorph would therefore resemble those of C. mansonii.

Ideal growth conditions for E. dermatitidis occur between 40 °C (104 °F) and 42 °C (108 °F), however E. dermatitidis can tolerate temperatures as high as 47 °C (117 °F). Metabolically active fungus is highly abundant in Turkish steam baths that routinely reach temperatures of over 60 °C (140 °F), but is typically not found in more hot and dry sauna facilities, or in cool environments surrounding steam baths. It is thought that extracellular polysaccharides may protect the species from stress in hot and moist environments, as this feature is typical of strains isolated from steam baths. Exophiala dermatitidis has carotenoid pigments in its cell wall that may serve a role in protecting E. dermatitidis from UV damage.

Thermophilicity, negative potassium nitrate assimilation, negative melezitose assimilation, and an ability to decompose tyrosine are used to distinguish E. dermatitidis from other black yeasts. An exoantigen test is useful in species determination, and DNA analysis can also be performed. The fungus has been selectively isolated using high temperature incubation (at 40 °C) on media containing cycloheximide.

Studies suggest that colonies of E. dermatitidis and related fungi growing within the ruins of the Chernobyl Nuclear Power Plant may be able to metabolize ionizing radiation.

== Geographic distribution ==
Exophiala dermatitidis has been isolated around the world in low abundance from a variety of environmental sources, including soil, decaying timber, and wasp nests. The thermophilicity and acid tolerance of E. dermatitidis suggests passage through warm-blooded animals, and it is hypothesized that its ecological niche might be associated with tropical, frugivorous bird and bat species. An ability to utilize nutrients in diverse environments, to adhere to fruit surfaces, and progress through different morphological phases are considered to provide further evidence for this theory. Clinical isolates tend to harbor strains that are found only rarely in nature. It may be the case that traits linked to halotolerance have predisposed these strains towards infecting humans.

While E. dermatitidis has been found only in low abundance in nature, the species is well suited to survive in a number of warm and wet man made niches. Metabolically active strains are isolated in high abundance from surfaces inside saunas, steam baths and humidifiers. E. dermatitidis is one of the most common fungal species to inhabit dishwashers, and has been found in dishwashers around the world.

== Pathophysiology ==
Exophiala dermatitidis is typically considered a human opportunistic pathogen, as those affected by E. dermatitidis often have underlying health conditions. An exception to this is the neurotropic clinical presentation, which is typically found in young and otherwise healthy individuals.

While over 100 fungal species can cause phaeohyphomycosis, E. dermatitidis is one of the two fungi most frequently implicated, along with another Exophiala species, E. jeanselmei. Exophiala dermatitidis is considered to be one of the most pathogenic fungi in the genus Exophiala, and is highly deadly, with a fatality rate of over 40%. The high fatality rate is primarily due to an ability to form systemic and neurotropic infections, which represent approximately half of reported E. dermatitidis cases.

=== Local and superficial infections ===
Exophiala dermatitidis forms cutaneous and subcutaneous phaeohyphomycosis, which most commonly affect the face and neck. Indeed, the fungus was originally isolated from the skin of a patient with lesions on their cheek, neck, and ear. Cells isolated from cutaneous infections are often spherical, and may form toruloid or moniliform chains. Exophiala dermatitidis has been implicated various superficial infections including onychomycosis, otitis externa, and eye infections causing keratitis.

In Europe E. dermatitidis tends to be associated with cystic fibrosis, and is frequently found to have colonized the lungs of CF patients. In one study, E. dermatitidis could be isolated from 6.2% of cystic fibrosis patients using erythritol-chloramphenicol agar culture dishes. Exophiala dermatitidis has also been reported as the etiological agent of lung infections causing pneumonia.

=== Systemic infections ===
Exophiala dermatitidis forms neurotrophic infections, and is the black yeast that most commonly causes life-threatening phaeohyphomycosis. Conditions that might predispose people towards an invasive opportunistic infection include diabetes mellitus, lymphocytic leukemia, bronchiectasis, rheumatoid arthritis, and catheterization. Systemic infections are often reported to be without cutaneous or subcutaneous involvement.

Systemic E. dermatitidis infections can include cerebral metastases. The fatality rate for such infections is reported to be over 90%. Central nervous system phaeohyphomycosis is rare, and for unknown reasons primarily arise in East Asia, despite a cosmopolitan distribution of the fungus. Within East Asian populations, young and otherwise healthy people have developed cerebral infections. Lung infections in European CF patients and neurotropic mycosis in East Asia are caused by E. dermatitidis strains that are genetically similar, and host factors such as immunological differences may be responsible for the different infection patterns. Exophiala dermatitidis occurs at very high frequency in both Asian and European saunas, and absence of neurotrophic mycosis in Europe isn't explained by reduced exposure to the fungus.

In 2002 a small outbreak of systemic E. dermatitidis infection occurred in North Carolina hospitals, involving five women who received steroid injections for pain management. In one of women the infection wasn't evident until 152 days after injection of the contaminated solution. Isolates from these patients were found by the FDA to be susceptible to all of voriconazole, itraconazole, and amphotericin B. In one patient the infection caused sacroiliitis, while the remaining four developed meningitis. Meningitis eventually caused death in one patient, while voriconazole was successful in treating infection in the four other patients. The outbreak was traced back to a single compounding pharmacy, which was found by the FDA to have inadequately controlled for sterility of its products.

=== Immune response ===
Exophiala dermatitidis typically causes a non-specific and granulomatous inflammatory response. Lymphocytes, histiocytes, multinucleated giant cells and neutrophils are recruited. The host responses are highly variable, often include cyst formation, and vary from weak reaction to an intense inflammatory response that results in tissue necrosis.

As with other black yeasts that cause phaeohyphomycosis, melanin appears to have defensive purpose, and helps protect E. dermatitidis from death within human neutrophils. Pathogenic strains of E. dermatitidis contain five times more melanin than saprophytic E. dermatitidis, while melanin deficient mutants of pathogenic strains have dramatically reduced virulence.

=== Treatment ===
A diagnosis of E. dermatitidis infection of the CNS can only be reliably achieved following biopsy. For systemic infections there are few treatment options, and E. dermatitidis is described as "notoriously resistant" to antifungal drugs. During the North Carolina outbreak, treatment with voriconazole was effective in four out of the five patients, and all of voriconazole, itraconazole, and amphotericin B were found to be effective in vitro. Terbinafine has also been found to be effective in vitro, and combinations of antifungal drugs can have a synergistic effect against E. dermatitidis. A 2012 article found that of reported cases, 44% of patients responded to amphotericin B treatment, 50% responded to voriconazole treatment, and 71.4% responded to itraconazole therapy.

For small and local infections surgery may be an option. As E. dermatitidis infections are believed to be caused by traumatic implantation of the fungus, surgeons must be exceedingly careful to not re-introduce infection during operation. Despite the high heat tolerance of E. dermatitidis, heat treatment of cutaneous lesions have been effective.
