= Botryomycosis =

- Other names: Bacterial pseudomycosis
- Specialty: Infectious disease
- Frequency: Uncommon

Botryomycosis is a bacterial skin infection that typically presents with crusted, purulent large bumps. Sulphur granules generally discharge via sinuses, which heal leaving thin-skinned scars.

== Presentation ==
=== Associated conditions ===
There are only a handful of documented cases of botryomycosis in humans, and its pathogenesis is not completely understood. However, it is usually described in individuals with impaired immunity, or with an underlying disease such as diabetes mellitus, cystic fibrosis or HIV infection.

== Causes ==
It is most frequently caused by Staphylococcus aureus, and less frequently by Pseudomonas aeruginosa, E. coli, Proteus, and Streptococcus, Bacteroides. Risk factors include weak immune system, HIV, alcoholism, and Job syndrome.

== Diagnosis ==
Diagnosis is by culture of the discharge.

== History ==
The disease was originally discovered by Otto Bollinger (1843–1909) in 1870, and its name was coined by Sebastiano Rivolta (1832–1893) in 1884. The name refers to its grape-like granules (Gr. botryo = grapes) and the mistakenly implied fungal etiology (Gr. mykes = fungus). In 1919 the bacterial origin of the infection was discovered.
