= Ravuconazole =

Chemical compound

Clinical data
- ATC code: None

Identifiers
- IUPAC name: 4-[2-[(2R,3R)-3-(2,4-Difluorophenyl)-3-hydroxy-4-(1,2,4-triazol-1-yl)butan-2-yl]-1,3-thiazol-4-yl]benzonitrile
- CAS Number: 182760-06-1
- PubChem CID: 467825
- ChemSpider: 411041
- UNII: 95YH599JWV
- ChEBI: CHEBI:143825
- ChEMBL: ChEMBL294029
- NIAID ChemDB: 057176
- CompTox Dashboard (EPA): DTXSID40171329

Chemical and physical data
- Formula: C_{22}H_{17}F_{2}N_{5}OS
- Molar mass: 437.47 g·mol^{−1}
- 3D model (JSmol): Interactive image
- SMILES: C[C@@H](c1nc(-c2ccc(C#N)cc2)cs1)[C@](O)(Cn1cncn1)c1ccc(F)cc1F
- InChI: InChI=1S/C22H17F2N5OS/c1-14(21-28-20(10-31-21)16-4-2-15(9-25)3-5-16)22(30,11-29-13-26-12-27-29)18-7-6-17(23)8-19(18)24/h2-8,10,12-14,30H,11H2,1H3/t14-,22+/m0/s1; Key:OPAHEYNNJWPQPX-RCDICMHDSA-N

Ravuconazole (codenamed BMS-207147 and ER-30346) is a potent triazole antifungal, the development of which was discontinued in 2007. The drug has shown to have a similar spectrum of activity to voriconazole, with an increased half-life. However, ravuconazole has limited activity against species of Fusarium, Scedosporium, and Zygomycetes.

== See also ==
- Albaconazole
- Fosravuconazole, a prodrug of ravuconazole
- Isavuconazole
