= Black yeast =

Group of fungi

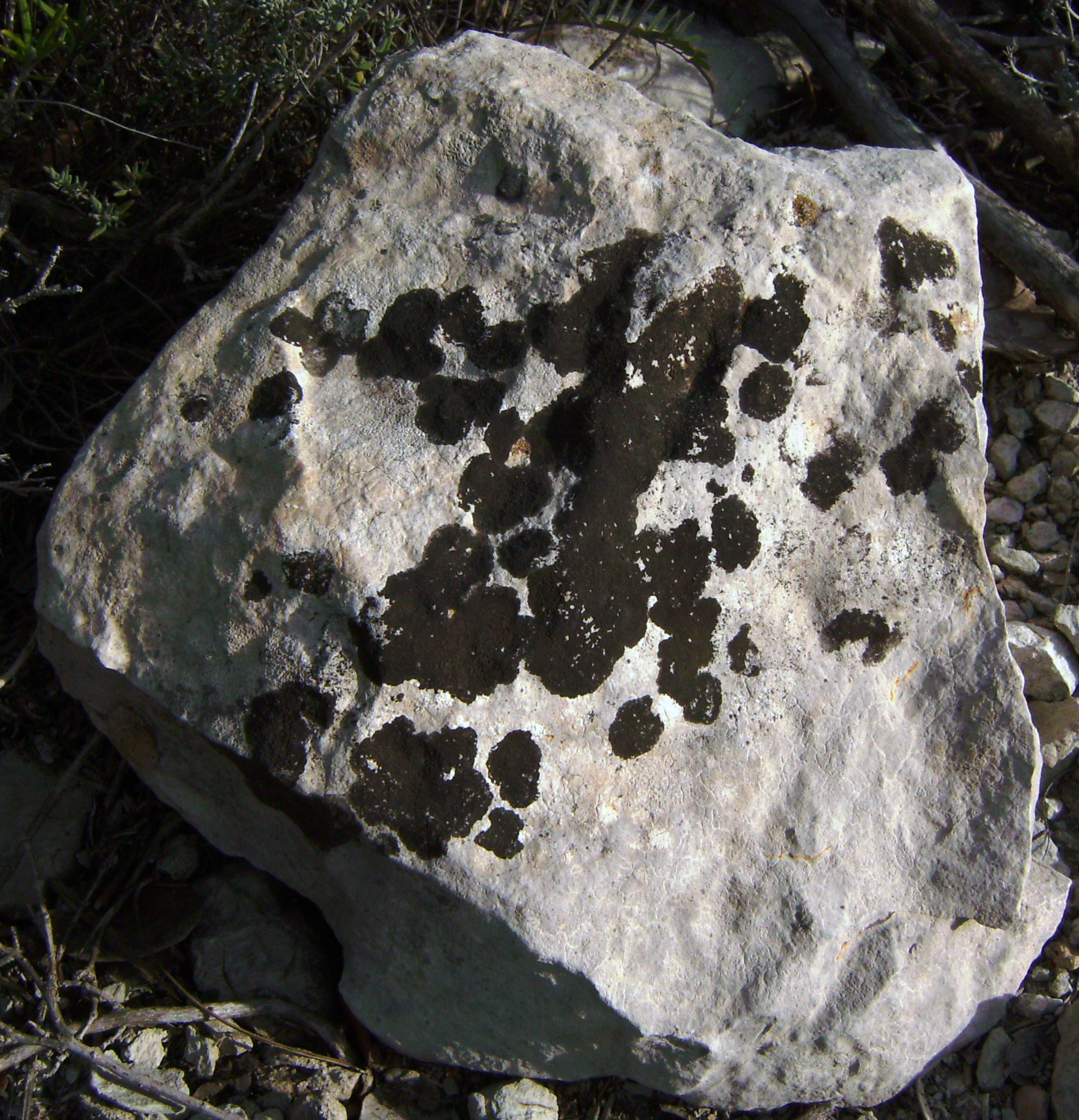
Black yeast growing on a limestone, Castelltallat, Spain

Black yeasts, sometimes also black fungi, dematiaceous fungi, microcolonial fungi or meristematic fungi is a diverse group of slow-growing microfungi which reproduce mostly asexually (fungi imperfecti). Only few genera reproduce by budding cells, while in others hyphal or meristematic (isodiametric) reproduction is preponderant. Black yeasts share some distinctive characteristics, in particular a dark colouration (melanisation) of their cell wall. Morphological plasticity, incrustation of the cell wall with melanins and presence of other protective substances like carotenoids and mycosporines represent passive physiological adaptations which enable black fungi to be highly resistant against environmental stresses. The term "polyextremotolerance" has been introduced to describe this phenotype, an example of which is the species Aureobasidium pullulans. Presence of 1,8-dihydroxynaphthalene melanin in the cell wall confers to the microfungi their characteristic olivaceous to dark brown/black colour.

The consortium comprises two phylogenetically very different fungal groups. Many are found in the orders Capnodiales, Dothideales, and Pleosporales (class Dothideomycetes). These black fungi mostly have an extremotolerant life style. Many representatives of this group can colonize bare rocks, e.g. in the Mediterranean basin or in hot and cold dry deserts, and are therefore referred to as rock-inhabiting fungi, or occur in salterns. These black yeasts are believed to be the most resistant eukaryotic organisms known to-date. They were firstly described in the early 80s by three almost concomitant seminal research articles. Members of Chaetothyriales (class Eurotiomycetes) are found in hydrocarbon-rich environments or in nutrient-poor, moist indoor environments, and may occur as opportunistic pathogens of vertebrate hosts, such as Exophiala (Wangiella) dermatitidis. Several species are associated with lichens as well as other phototrophs and sometimes with ants in specific ant-fungi associations.

In recent years, black fungi such as E. dermatitidis or Hortaea werneckii have attracted increasingly attention as model microorganisms in studies on astrobiology, bioremediation of polluted ecosystems by biofiltration, effect of ionizing radiation in contaminated areas, biodeterioration of materials, and mechanisms of adaptation to high salt concentrations. A collaborative effort coordinated by the Broad Institute is currently ongoing to sequence the genomes of several black fungi to shed light into their ecology, phylogeny and pathogenicity.

Certain dematiaceous fungi cause phaeohyphomycosis, in which melanin is a virulence factor, as well as chromoblastomycosis and eumycetoma. Sporothrix schenckii, the causal agent of sporothricosis, is also a dematiaceous fungus.

In 2011, a research paper about occurrence of potentially pathogenic black fungi in household dishwashers was partially misreported by the media and went viral.

Black yeasts are not related to the edible cloud ear fungus Auricularia polytricha.
