= Exophiala jeanselmei =

Scientific classification
- Kingdom: Fungi
- Division: Ascomycota
- Class: Eurotiomycetes
- Order: Chaetothyriales
- Family: Herpotrichiellaceae
- Genus: Exophiala
- Species: E. jeanselmei

Binomial name
- Exophiala jeanselmei (Langeron) McGinnis & A.A.Padhye (1977)

Synonyms
- Torula jeanselmei Langeron (1928); Pullularia jeanselmei (Langeron) C.W.Dodge (1935); Phialophora jeanselmei (Langeron) C.W.Emmons (1945)

Species of fungus

Exophiala jeanselmei is a saprotrophic fungus in the family Herpotrichiellaceae. Four varieties have been discovered: Exophiala jeanselmei var. heteromorpha, E. jeanselmei var. lecanii-corni, E. jeanselmei var. jeanselmei, and E. jeanselmei var. castellanii. Other species in the genus Exophiala such as E. dermatitidis and E. spinifera have been reported to have similar annellidic conidiogenesis and may therefore be difficult to differentiate.

== History ==
Exophiala jeanselmei was first isolated in 1928 by Jeanselme from a case of black mycetoma on the foot. The nomenclature was based on the fungus' morphological characteristics, hence, it was originally classified as Torula jeanselmei because of its yeast like shape when grown in culture. It was later reclassified by McGinnis and Padhye in 1977 as Exophiala jeanselmei after further research on conidiogenesis.

== Morphology ==
In culture, E. jeanselmei produces slow growing colonies that are green black in color. Cultures manifest a combination of mycelial and yeast-like growth forms, however the yeast-like typically predominates. Black aerial mycelium develops on the colony surface that consists of hyphae with swellings at regular intervals. Conidia are variable in size and are often formed in clusters at the tip of annellidic conidiogenous cells. The conidia are narrowly ellipsoidal in shape and 2.6–5.9 μm × 1.2–2.5 μm in size. Immature sexual fruiting bodies called ascomata have been reported but their rare occurrence are thought to be due to the lack of mating compatibility. Exophiala jeanselmei is affiliated with the ascomycete genus Capronia.

== Ecology ==
Exophiala jeanselmei is commonly found in soil, plants, water, and can also be isolated from decaying wood as this fungus is a saprotroph in nature. This species has world-wide occurrence but are particularly noted in Asia and more commonly in tropical and subtropical regions. The genus Exophiala has been isolated from hydrocarbon rich environments as well as from hot, humid, and oligotrophic environments such as dishwashers, steam bath facilities and bathrooms that only provide low levels of nutrients. It has been proposed that the conditions usually found within dishwashers such as high temperature, moisture and alkaline pH can provide an alternative habitat for human pathogenic species. The fungus has optimal growth at 30 °C but growth is inhibited at 40 °C. Most strains isolated from soil cannot grow at temperatures higher than 30 °C while strains isolated from humans can grow at higher temperatures such as 37 °C of the human body. This adaptation of E. jeanselmei had developed evolutionarily in order to survive on their human hosts. This is a distinguishing factor that helps in determining the pathogenicity of a particular strain. A feature that distinguishes E. jeanselmei from Cladosporium which forms very similar colonies is that E. jeanselmei is not proteolytic. This species is able to assimilate glucose, galactose, maltose, and sucrose, but not lactose.

== Pathogenesis ==
Exophiala jeanselmei has versatile adaptability and acts as an opportunistic pathogen. Infections are more common in immunocompromised people and can also have manifestations in healthy people with wounded skin via traumatic implantation. Chronic steroid use has been found to increase the severity of inflammation. There were also cases where infections by E. jeanselmei occurred during solid organ transplants. Infections frequently cause inflammation in the cutaneous and subcutaneous tissues of the skin, causing phaeomycotic cyst, chromoblastomycosis and can occasionally cause eumycetoma which is a chronic granulomatous disease in the form of black grains. Mycetoma, a common form of clinical manifestation of E. jeanselmei, is a chronic granulomatous inflammatory disease that forms abscess and draining sinuses in more advanced stages. In mycotic mycetoma, vesicles of cyst like structures are formed. Dissemination, endocarditis and arthritis could arise from an opportunistic infection by E. jeanselmei, and it was also isolated from phaeohyphomycosis with sclerotic round bodies. There have been several cases of E. jeanselmei being the etiological agent of phaeohyphomycosis in domesticated cats where diagnoses were confirmed by sequencing the fungus' ribosomal RNA. The grains of this fungus are small, black in color and have soft centers. Rare cases of keratitis, infection of the cornea, have also identified E. jeanselmei as the etiological agent.

== In vitro susceptibility and treatment ==
The minimum inhibitory concentration (MIC) of fluconazole for E. jeanselmei is very high, flucytosine and miconazole also have relatively high MICs which indicate that the fungus is fairly resistant to these drugs. Amphotericin B, ketoconazole, and voriconazole have lower MICs, and E. jeanselmei is most susceptible to itraconazole and terbinafine. Novel drugs such as echinocandin and caspofungin also have favorable antifungal activity against Exophiala jeanselmei isolates. However, in vitro susceptibility in comparison to the efficacy of antifungal agents in clinical manifestations of this fungus is currently unknown, that in vitro success may or may not directly correlate clinically.

Previous cases of black grain mycetoma caused by E. jeanselmei were clinically treated and cases of phaeohyphomycosis caused by this fungus were completely cured where both cases were remedied by administering itraconazole. E. jeanselmei also showed some susceptibility to being treated with antifungal agents such as amphotericin B, voriconazole and posaconazole. Amphotericin B used to be the most potent antifungal treatment for severe fungal infections, but due to its strong association with severe side effects such as nephrotoxicity, its use is now often replaced with azoles and echinocandins. The use of combinations of surgical excision and pharmacological treatments for severe infections is usually the preferred way to treat diseases caused by this fungus.
