= Phaeohyphomycosis =

- Specialty: Infectious diseases
- Symptoms: Skin: subcutaneous nodule or cyst; Brain: neurological symptoms
- Causes: Breathing in or entry via a cut in the skin of dark filamentous fungi
- Diagnostic method: Histology, culture, PCR
- Differential diagnosis: Aspergillosis, chromoblastomycosis, cryptococcosis, mycetoma
- Treatment: Surgical debridement/drainage, antifungals
- Medication: Itraconazole, amphotericin B
- Frequency: Rare

Phaeohyphomycosis is a diverse group of fungal infections, caused by dematiaceous fungi whose morphologic characteristics in tissue include hyphae, yeast-like cells, or a combination of these. It can be associated with an array of melanistic filamentous fungi including Alternaria species, Exophiala jeanselmei, and Rhinocladiella mackenziei.

The term "phaeohyphomycosis" was introduced to determine infections caused by dematiaceous (pigmented) filamentous fungi which contain melanin in their cell walls. Phaeohyphomycosis is an uncommon infection, but the number of cases reported has been increasing in recent years. Fungal melanin is thought to be a virulence factor. The outcome of antifungal treatment is poor, and mortality is almost 80%. Phaeohyphomycosis has been attributed to more than 100 species and 60 genera of fungi over the past several decades. The pathogens are considered opportunistic. Almost all cases of widely disseminated infection have occurred in immunosuppressed people.

== Clinical signs of phaeohyphomycosis ==
=== Wildlife ===
Phaeohyphomycosis is found throughout the animal kingdom. From molluscs to humans, different strains of this fungus affect animals differently, based on how severely the fungus has infected the animal. The clinical signs depend on the species of animal that is infected as well as the strain of fungus it is infected with. This disease is usually found more often in stressed animals after removal from their habitat.

=== Invertebrates ===
Invertebrates, such as crabs and mollusks, show a variety of clinical signs.

Crabs had increasingly weak motor control, especially in legs and claws, and were lethargic. They had poor balance and tetany, or muscle spasms, in the claws. Finally, they had tissue necrosis, which caused deterioration of the epidermis, connective tissue, heart, hepatopancreas, nervous system, and gills. In severe cases, there was congestion of hemal sinuses, two principal empty areas along the digestive tube and vessels. Mass amounts of yeast-like cells compressed nerve fibers and the gill lamellae were destroyed.

Mollusks clinical signs vary from scattered spots of brownish discoloration on the mantle tissues to general deterioration of mussel condition. In severe cases, there were black-bodied mussels with a distinct odor and black yeast cells infected the connective tissues around the gonads and the digestive tract.

=== Cold-blooded vertebrates ===
Cold-blooded vertebrates can exhibit an assortment of clinical signs.

Amphibians may show signs of anorexia. Ulcers or nodules in the skin can be found, as well as swelling and lesions of internal organs, including the spleen, liver, and kidney. In extreme cases, neurological disorders and multifocal dermatitis (swelling caused by irritation of the fungus) can occur.

Fish demonstrate signs of lethargy and disoriented swimming. Ulcerative lesions, multiple dark foci in the gills, and non-ulcerative dermal masses may be found. In critical cases, some fish show a variety of inflammatory responses including the formation of microabscesses. Lesions in the brain and kidneys may be present. These fish have abnormal swimming behavior, bulging eyes, and abdominal swelling.

=== Warm-blooded vertebrates ===
From birds to equines, phaeohyphomycosis persists and has a massive range of clinical signs throughout differing species. Infected poultry and wild birds can develop neurological disorders and a loss of movement control. They may experience severe torticollis, which are severe muscle spasms that compromise the bird's ability to hold up its head. Birds can exhibit a loss of balance due to the rigidity of their legs.

Cats can exhibit signs of breathing difficulty due to excessive swelling of the nose. Lesions may occur throughout the body, including the brain. Common lesions include ulcerated cutaneous nodules of the digits, pinnae, nasal planum, and nasal/paranasal tissues.

In extreme cases dogs exhibit vision impairment and have deep infections in the nasal cavity, kidneys, and the cerebellum. In dogs, brain infections similar to infections found in humans may occur. Other clinical signs are lesions, abscesses, and severe inflammation throughout the dog's body.

Ruminants and equines are affected the same way from phaeohyphomycosis. They can exhibit respiratory distress with constant coughing and a fever. They demonstrate signs of anorexia, lethargy, and hypothermia. There may be inflammation, hair loss, scaling, and damage to the cerebellum.

=== Humans ===
Humans' clinical signs consist of swelling and eye infections. Nodules underneath the skin, abscesses or cysts may be present. and lesions can run throughout the body, including papules, plaques and granulomatous damage. In extreme cases there can be deep infections within the eyes, bones, heart and central nervous system.

== Treatment ==
Extensive treatments have been used on domestic animals more than on wild animals, probably because infected domestic animals are easier to identify and treat than infected wildlife. Treatment plans and management vary across taxa because this disease tends to affect each species differently. Antifungal drugs are the first line of defense to kill the agents causing phaeohyphomycosis, but despite the significant progress made in the last two decades and a 30% increase in available antifungal drugs since 2000, many drugs are not effective against black fungi. Diseases caused by black fungi are hard to treat because the fungi are very difficult to kill. This high resilience may be contributed to the presence of melanin in their cell walls, as well as the greater similarity to host cells which are both eukaryotes than other pathogens such as bacteria or viruses. Current antifungal agents the fungi are not resistant to are posaconazole, voriconazole, and azole isavuconazole.

In 2006, a free-living eastern box turtle, Terrapene carolina carolina, was found with a form of phaeohyphomycosis and was brought in the Wildlife Center of Virginia. Its symptom was swelling of the right hindfoot; it was diagnosed as having chromomycosis by histopathology. The center provided a series of antimicrobial treatments and a one-month course of 1 mg itraconazole, administered orally once a day. The eastern box turtle was euthanized due to extent of lesional involvement and the caretakers' belief that the turtle would not be able to survive if placed back in the wild. At necropsy, Exophiala jeanselmei was cultured from a swab of the lesion.

A recent case of a form of phaeohyphomycosis infection was found in a dog in 2011. The Journal of the American Veterinary Medical Association published a case study in which researchers successfully managed an intracranial phaeohyphomycotic fungal granuloma in a one-year-old male Boxer dog. Veterinarians of the Department of Veterinary Clinical Sciences at Tufts University surgically removed the granuloma in the right cerebral hemisphere. The patient was treated with fluconazole for 4 months, followed by voriconazole for 10 months. Based on magnetic resonance imaging and cerebrospinal fluid (CSF) analysis 8 months after the surgery, the male Boxer's outcome was considered excellent.

Emphasis has been placed on how to manage this disease through careful management practices including: proper handling, preventing crowding situation with animals, and transportation. Both the animals and the environment should be treated thoroughly to hinder the spread and control the fungal infection. This is especially important since humans can also contract this disease.

== Research projects and implications ==
Phaeohyphomycosis is a disease caused by fungi. If given the opportunity, the disease can involve the brain and cause a painful death. There have been multiple reports of this host of fungi, but by the time the disease is recognized, it is usually too late for the animal to be successfully treated. Recent searches of databases show that there are no current projects studying the spread of this fungus in wild animals, though there are documented cases of its occurrence.

In 2005, a five-month-old snow leopard (Uncia uncia) in Europe was diagnosed with phaeohyphomycosis due to Cladophialophora bantiana. This fungus caused spastic paralysis as well as the inability to defecate or urinate. Because of this finding, more researchers are aware of this disease and the fact that it does not just infect the brain, as previously thought, but also other organs and other parts of the nervous system. A Purdue University study in 2011 showed a Huacaya alpaca (Vicugna pacos) with the same fungus affected by cerebral phaeohyphomycosis. The eight-year-old animal was the first report of this disease in a camelid ruminant.

In conclusion, phaeohyphomycosis is a highly prolific disease that is caused by multiple genera of fungi. The disease is transmissible through several mediums, including air, wind, and water. Both individual animals and whole populations can be affected by it. Although it does not seem to be an epidemic, it is nonetheless an area of concern and requires much more active research rather than simply reports of terminal or already-dead animals.

== See also ==
- Skin lesion
