= Deacetoxycephalosporin-C hydroxylase =

Class of enzymes

Identifiers
- EC no.: 1.14.11.26

Databases
- IntEnz: IntEnz view
- BRENDA: BRENDA entry
- ExPASy: NiceZyme view
- KEGG: KEGG entry
- MetaCyc: metabolic pathway
- PRIAM: profile
- PDB structures: RCSB PDB PDBe PDBsum
Search
- PMC: articles
- PubMed: articles
- NCBI: proteins

Deacetoxycephalosporin-C hydroxylase (EC 1.14.11.26) is an enzyme that catalyzes the chemical reaction

deacetoxycephalosporin C
Fe(IV)=O
Fe(II)
deacetylcephalosporin C

The two substrates of this enzyme are deacetoxycephalosporin C and oxygen. Its product is deacetylcephalosporin C.

This enzyme is an oxidoreductase with systematic name deacetoxycephalosporin-C,2-oxoglutarate:oxygen oxidoreductase (3-hydroxylating). Other names in common use include deacetylcephalosporin C synthase, 3'-methylcephem hydroxylase, DACS, DAOC hydroxylase, and deacetoxycephalosporin C hydroxylase. This non-heme iron protein generates a ferryl group at its active site; Fe(IV)=O is the species that transfers its oxygen to the substrate.

The mechanism used by these 2-oxoglutarate-dependent oxygenases requires 2-oxoglutaric acid to activate the iron oxygen complex, and this gives succinic acid and carbon dioxide when the second atom of the molecular oxygen is removed.

2-oxoglutaric acid
[O]
CO_{2}
succinic acid

== Biological role ==
This enzyme is involved in the biosynthesis of cephalosporin C in Acremonium chrysogenum, which is used for the industrial production of that antibiotic.
