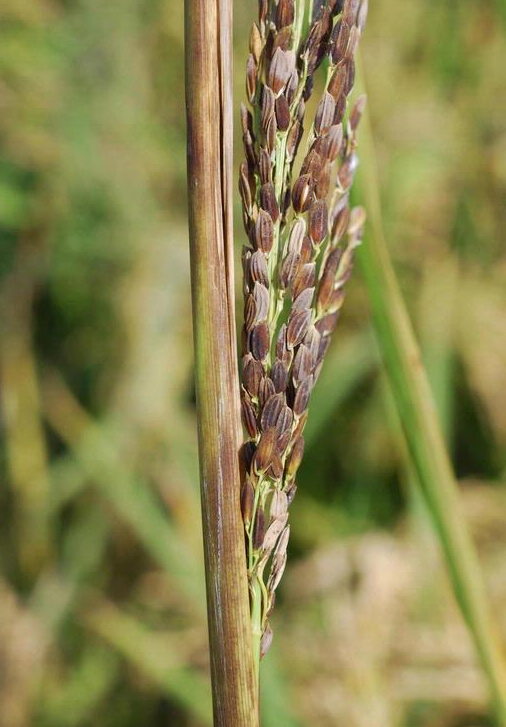
- Sheath rot of rice

Scientific classification
- Kingdom: Fungi
- Division: Ascomycota
- Class: Sordariomycetes
- Order: Hypocreales
- Family: Sarocladiaceae
- Genus: Sarocladium; W.Gams & D. Hawksw. (1976)

Type species
- Sarocladium oryzae (Sawada) W.Gams & D. Hawksw. (1976)

= Sarocladium =

Genus of fungi

Sarocladium is a genus of saprotrophic fungi found in crops, soil, plant debris, and rotting mushrooms. It was created by Walter Gams and David Leslie Hawksworth for the species of rice fungus, Sarocladium oryzae, in 1976. The species are most notable as a causative pathogens of sheath rot of rice and blight in bamboo. Species like S. strictum can cause infection in humans called hyalohyphomycosis (skin, nail and tissue infection) that can lead to fatal disease if improperly treated.

== Taxonomy ==
The first species of Sarocladium identified was S. oryzae. It was discovered by Japanese biologist Kaneyoshi (Kenkichi) Sawada from the rice field in Taiwan and described it in 1922 as Acrocylindrium oryzae. But other fungi of the genus was already discovered in the early 19th century that was not identified as such. In 1839, Czech botanist August Carl Joseph Corda identified the causative pathogen of skin and tissue infections as a fungus that he named Cephalosporium acremonium. Although the fungi were morphologically similar, the relationship between the plant and human pathogenic species could not be understood until the development of DNA sequencing.

In 1971, Walter Gams discovered saprophytic fungus from maize kernel and gave the name Acremonium strictum. Gams's specimen was found to be identical with Corda's C. acremonium, and both names became commonly used. All related species were simply assigned under the genus Acremonium. The problem arose when the number of species increased to over 150, thereby making classification chaotic. In 2011, Canadian mycologist Richard Summerbell and his European collaborators reanalysed the fungal group, and using DNA sequencing, concluded that C. acremonium/A. strictum and related fungi formed a genetically distinct group, and therefore reassigned in a separate genus, Sarocladium. The genus Sarocladium was already established by Gams and David Leslie Hawksworth for the revision of Sawada's A. oryzae as Sarocladium oryzae in 1976.

== Species ==
Sarocladium contains the following species:

- Sarocladium agarici L.W. Hou, L. Cai & Crous 2023
- Sarocladium alniphilum Lin Zhao & Crous 2026
- Sarocladium bacillisporum (Onions & G.L. Barron) Summerb. 2011
- Sarocladium bactrocephalum (W. Gams) Summerb. 2011
- Sarocladium bambusicola L.L. Liu, K. Habib & Q.R. Li 2025
- Sarocladium bidentis Htet, Mapook, Chethana & K.D. Hyde 2025
- Sarocladium bifurcatum A. Giraldo, Gené & Deanna A. Sutton 2014
- Sarocladium brachiariae X.B. Liu, G.X. Huang & Z.K. Guo 2017
- Sarocladium breskovskae Y.P. Tan, Valter, Marney & E. Lacey 2025
- Sarocladium caricicola Crous & Osieck 2024
- Sarocladium catenulatum Lin Zhao & Crous 2026
- Sarocladium citri L.W. Hou, L. Cai & Crous 2023
- Sarocladium clematidis Phukhams., Ertz, Gerstmans & K.D. Hyde 2020
- Sarocladium dejongiae L. Lombard 2018
- Sarocladium ferrugineum L.W. Hou, L. Cai & Crous 2023
- Sarocladium formosanum K.W. Cheng & H.A. Ariy. 2025
- Sarocladium fuscum L.W. Hou, L. Cai & Crous 2023
- Sarocladium gamsii A. Giraldo, Gené & Guarro 2014
- Sarocladium glaucum (W. Gams) Summerb. 2011
- Sarocladium graminicola R.M. Anjos, S.I. Moreira, S.S. Costa & P.G. Cardoso 2020
- Sarocladium guizhouense X. Li Tian, Wan H. Chen & J.Hong Zhao 2025
- Sarocladium hirsutum Lin Zhao & Crous 2026
- Sarocladium hominis A. Giraldo, Gené & Deanna A. Sutton 2014
- Sarocladium humicola Lin Zhao & Crous 2026
- Sarocladium hyalosporum C.G. Lin, K.D. Hyde & Jian K. Liu 2025
- Sarocladium implicatum (J.C. Gilman & E.V. Abbott) A. Giraldo, Gené & Guarro 2014
- Sarocladium junci Crous & Osieck 2021
- Sarocladium kiliense (Grütz) Summerb. 2011
- Sarocladium krotoszynense Patejuk, Piątek & Czachura 2026
- Sarocladium limosialveum Lin Zhao, O.A. Grum-Grzhim. & Crous 2026
- Sarocladium liquanense G.Y. Sun & Y.M. Hou 2019
- Sarocladium mali G.Y. Sun & Y.M. Hou 2019
- Sarocladium menglaense L.H. Zhu, L. Zhou bis & D.W. Li 2025
- Sarocladium mycophilum Helfer 1991
- Sarocladium nubiaquae Lin Zhao & Crous 2026
- Sarocladium ochraceum (Onions & G.L. Barron) Summerb. 2011
- Sarocladium oryzae (Sawada) W. Gams & D. Hawksw. 1976
- Sarocladium pseudokiliense Rezakhani, Khodap., Masigol & Grossart 2022
- Sarocladium pseudostrictum A. Giraldo, Gené & Deanna A. Sutton 2014
- Sarocladium sasijaorum Hern.-Restr. 2021
- Sarocladium serpentinicola K.W. Cheng & H.A. Ariy. 2025
- Sarocladium sinense J.D. Chen, Guo C. Zhang & X.H. Fu 1987
- Sarocladium solani H.Z. Du & Jian K. Liu 2025
- Sarocladium sparsum J.H. Ou, G.C. Lin & Chi Y. Chen 2020
- Sarocladium spinificis Y.H. Yeh & R. Kirschner 2014
- Sarocladium spirale J.H. Ou, G.C. Lin & Chi Y. Chen 2020
- Sarocladium strictum (W. Gams) Summerb. 2011
- Sarocladium subulatum A. Giraldo, Gené & Guarro 2014
- Sarocladium summerbellii A. Giraldo, Gené & Guarro 2014
- Sarocladium terricola (J.H. Mill., Giddens & A.A. Foster) A. Giraldo, Gené & Guarro 2014
- Sarocladium theobromae L.W. Hou, L. Cai & Crous 2023
- Sarocladium yunnanense L.H. Zhu, L. Zhou bis & D.W. Li 2025
- Sarocladium zeae (W. Gams & D.R. Sumner) Summerb. 2011
