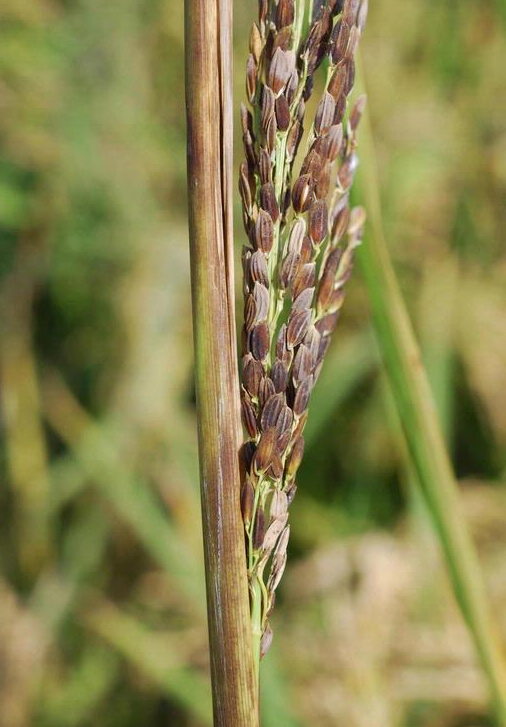
- Rice flag leaf sheath and head infection symptoms of sheath rot

Scientific classification
- Kingdom: Fungi
- Division: Ascomycota
- Class: Sordariomycetes
- Order: Hypocreales
- Family: Sarocladiaceae
- Genus: Sarocladium
- Species: S. oryzae

Binomial name
- Sarocladium oryzae (Sawada) W.Gams & D. Hawksw., (1976)

Synonyms
- Acrocylindrium oryzae Sawada, (1922); Sarocladium attenuatum W. Gams & D. Hawksw., (1976)

= Sarocladium oryzae =

Species of fungus

Sarocladium oryzae is a plant pathogen causing the sheath rot disease of rice and bamboo blight of Bambusoideae spp. in Asia.

== Taxonomy and morphology ==
Sarocladium oryzae has conidiophores which are irregularly penicillate and slimy, 1-celled conidia.

It was previously known as Acrocylindrium oryzae. For forty years prior to 2005, the industrial strain used to manufacture the antibiotic cerulenin was known under the invalidly published name "Cephalosporium caerulens", but a subculture of the original C. caerulens strain KF-140 was subsequently shown to be conspecific with S. oryzae.

== Physiology and metabolites ==
In axenic culture, S. oryzae produces 0.3–0.627 micrograms of helvolic acid and 0.9–4.8 micrograms of cerulenin per milliliter of culture medium. The level of helvolic acid correlated with a higher incidence of sheath rot disease. Rice grains from infected plants were found to contain 2.2 micrograms helvolic acid and 1.75 micrograms of cerulein per gram of infected seeds, which induce chlorosis and reduce the seed viability and seedling health.

== Plant disease symptoms ==
The disease is found in rice plants usually injured by insects or other diseases. Hot (20–28 °C (68–82 °F)) and humid (wet) weather favour the disease. It is also associated with virus-infected plants. Early symptoms are oblong to irregular spots, with gray centers and brown margins. Spots or rotting occur on the leaf sheath that encloses the young panicles. There is discoloration in the sheath. In severe infection, all or part of the young panicles do not emerge and remain within the sheath. Unemerged panicles will soon rot and produce powdery fungus growth inside the leaf sheath.

Infection occurs on the uppermost leaf sheath at all stages, but is most damaging when it occurs at late booting stage.

== Management ==
Partners of the CABI-led programme, Plantwise including the General Directorate of Agriculture in Cambodia have suggested reducing the density of planted crops to 25 by 25 centimetres (10 in × 10 in) and removing infected stubble and weeds from the field. They also recommend application of fertilisers including potassium, calcium sulphate and zinc sulphate during the tillering stage to strengthen the stem and leaf tissues.

The Bureau of Rice Research and Development, Rice Department, of Thailand recommends using disease-free seeds and plants, avoiding monocropping with any one variety of rice (planting at least two varieties in the same field), and regular monitoring of fields.

== Sources ==
This article incorporates text from a free content work. Licensed under CC-BY-SA (license statement/permission). Text taken from Plantwise Factsheets for Farmers: Rice Sheath Rot -Cambodia, General Directorate of Agriculture (Cambodia), CABI. Plantwise Knowledge Bank.

This article incorporates text from a free content work. Licensed under CC-BY-SA (license statement/permission). Text taken from PMDG: Rice Sheath Rot - Cambodia, GDA, Phnom Penh, Cambodia, CABI. Plantwise Knowledge Bank.

This article incorporates text from a free content work. Licensed under CC-BY-SA (license statement/permission). Text taken from PMDG: Dirty Panicle on rice - Thailand, Bureau of rice research and development, Rice Department (Thailand), CABI. Plantwise Knowledge Bank.
