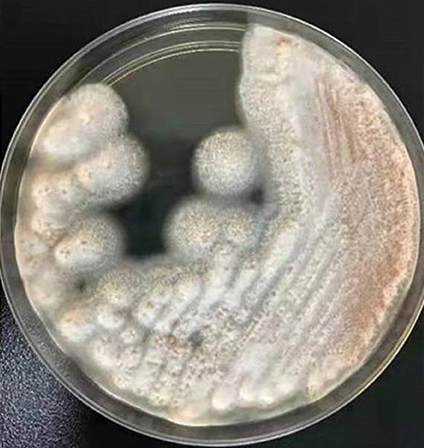
- Colony of Sarocladium strictum grown on Sabouraud's agar plates after 2 days at 28°C

Scientific classification
- Kingdom: Fungi
- Division: Ascomycota
- Class: Sordariomycetes
- Order: Hypocreales
- Family: Sarocladiaceae
- Genus: Sarocladium
- Species: S. strictum

Binomial name
- Sarocladium strictum (W.Gams) Summerb. (2011)

Synonyms
- Cephalosporium acremonium Corda (1839); Haplotrichum acremonium (Corda) Pound & Clem. (1896); Hyalopus acremonium (Corda) M.A.J.Barbosa (1941); Acremonium strictum W.Gams (1971)

= Sarocladium strictum =

Species of fungus

Sarocladium strictum (previously called Acremonium strictum or Cephalosporium acremonium) is an environmentally widespread saprotrophic fungi found in soil, plant debris, and rotting mushrooms. Isolates have been collected in North and Central America, Asia, Europe and Egypt. S. strictum is an agent of hyalohyphomycosis (skin, nail and tissue infection) and has been identified as an increasingly frequent human pathogen in immunosuppressed individuals, causing localized, disseminated and invasive infections. Although extremely rare, S. strictum can infect immunocompetent individuals, as well as newborns. Due to the growing number of infections caused by S. strictum in the past few years, the need for new medical techniques in the identification of the fungus as well as for the treatment of human infections has risen considerably.

S. strictum has been shown to be involved in some myoparasitic relationships, as well as a wide range of plant endophytic and parasitic relationships, and further studies are required to determine S. strictum's use as a biological control agent and role as a parasite that reduces crop yields. S. strictum exhibits metabolism of many products that imply future agricultural and pharmaceutical significance.

== Taxonomy ==
S. strictum was first discovered from a tissue infection by August Carl Joseph Corda, who identified the causative fungi as Cephalosporium acremonium. In 1971, Walter Gams discovered saprophytic fungus from maize kernel and gave the name Acremonium strictum in 1971. The genus Acremonium was created by Johann Heinrich Friedrich Link in 1809 for a new species he discovered, Acremonium alternatum. Gams's specimen was identified as the same species with C. acremonium, and both names became commonly used.

Discoveries of many new species led to the realization that the genus Acremonium was highly diverse. In 2011, Richard Summerbell and his European collaborators reanalysed the fungal group, and using DNA sequencing, concluded that Cephalosporium acremonium/Acremonium strictum and related fungi could be grouped into a different genus, Sarocladium. The genus Sarocladium was established by Gams and David Leslie Hawksworth for the species of rice fungus, Sarocladium oryzae, in 1976. The rice fungus was originally discovered by Kaneyoshi (Kenkichi) Sawada in 1922 as Acrocylindrium oryzae. Thus, the fungal species became accepted as S. strictum.

== General description ==
Species of Sarocladium are morphologically similar to those of Acremonium, a large polyphyletic genus of approximately 150 species, many of which are derived from a closely related families in the Sordariomycetes. Hence, they were recognized as Acremonium species for several years. However, their genetic distinction makes them identifiable into a distinct genus. The genus includes many slow growing, simply structured, anamorphic filamentous fungi, typically encountered in wet, cellulose-based building materials suffering form chronic wet conditions. Characteristic morphology in this genus is septate hyphae giving rise to thin, tapered aculeate phialides that are usually unicellular, or weakly branched conidiophores. Human infections, though rare, usually occur in severely immunodeficient individuals. S. strictum is mostly known to be involved with myparasitic relationships, as well as being a plant parasite and endophyte.

=== Morphological identification ===
==== Colonial appearance ====
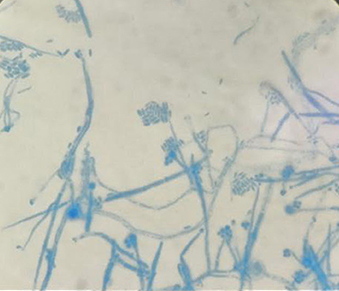
Morphology of a colony of Sarocladium strictum (lactophenol cotton blue preparation, ×100)

S. strictum grows readily at 30 °C on glucose peptone agar, showing mycelium of approximately 50mm in size in 7 days. Colonies are flat, with smooth, wet, velvety or floccose texture, sometimes resembling thin cottony mounds. The colour of mycelia ranges widely from light pink to orange, and sometimes yellow, white or green. S. strictum filaments are sometimes bound together into ropes several cells in diameter. Conidia grow as wet clusters or dry chains, and grains produced are white to pale-yellow, soft and variable in shape. Subcultures of the fungus can also be grow within seven days into smooth, moist, pink mycelia that resemble thin cotton.

==== Microscopic appearance ====
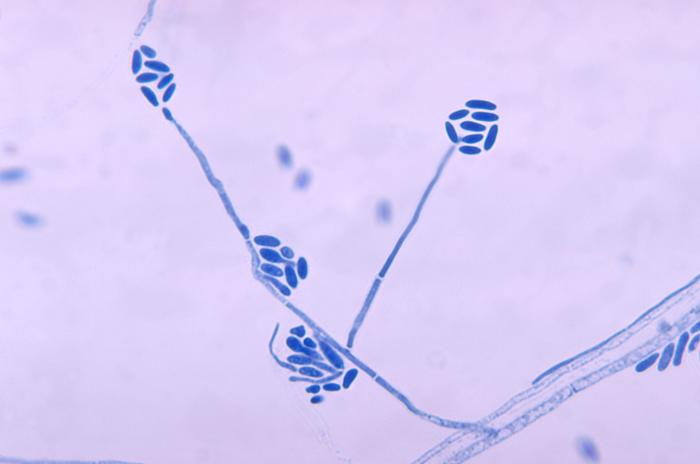
Conidia and conidiophores of the fungus Acremonium falciforme PHIL 4168 lores

Under the microscope at 30 °C, S. strictum shows long slender phialides, and conidia are cylindrical or ellipsoidal, formed in slimy bundles at the tips of the phialides. Lower microscopy shows pin-head spore ball formation.

Species of Sarocladium and Acremonium are morphologically very similar, making identification difficult. Shown in the image is a microscopic image of A. falciforme, an example showing the morphological similarities to S. strictum. Cases involving different species of Sarocladium are often reported as simply as an Acremonium species, which reduces the amount of accurate information on the clinical presentation of S. strictum. Isolates of phylogenetically remote species of Sarocladium show considerable convergence. As a human pathogen, diagnosis is made in isolation and identification of the fungus from granules in tissue and the presence of hyphae in microscopic examination of cutaneous biopsy and discharge.

Genera that are morphologically similar to Sarocladium include Fusarium, Phaeoacremonium, Verticillium, Phialemonium, and Lecanicillium.

=== Genetic identification ===
Identification of S. strictum isolates has shown that this fungus is phenotypically diverse and may vary genetically. Due to phylogenetic ambiguities, an unknown proportion of the literature on S. strictum is based on studies of Acremonium sclerotigenum. The fungus can generally be successfully identified by the nuclear ITS region sequence analysis. Analysis of the genes for ribosomal large subunit (LSU) and whole small subunit (SSU) also help to elucidate phylogenetic relationships, since these genes are more conserved and less subject to evolutionary changes. The species S. strictum is separated into three genogroups. Genogroup I is represented by type strain CBS 346.70, genogroup II by UW836 and genogroup III by UWFP940. These genogroups were determined based on GenBank entries for S. strictum.

== Pathophysiology ==
Human infections of S. strictum are very rare, and usually develop after traumatic inoculation of the fungus. Hyalophomycosis may occur in immunodeficient individuals, presented in the infected tissue by hyaline or colourless hyphae. Peritonitis and pleuritis have resulted from S. strictum infections, but cutaneous and subcutaneous infections of S. strictum are rarely reported.

- Most human infections have been reported to occur in immunocompromised patients and have been presented as localized or disseminated, fungemia, mycetoma or ocular infections, and often result in fatal cases. S. strictum may result in invasive infections such as pneumonia, arthritis, osteomyelitis, endocarditis, meningitis and sepsis in immunodeficient patients.
- Infections in immunocompetent individuals usually follows inoculation during penetration of the extremities and cornea, resulting in localized infections. The fungus can also cause onychomycosis, otomycosis and burn wound infection in immunocompetent individuals. Patients with prosthetic valves who are infected with S. strictum in the region of the valve may suffer from severe inflammation, resulting in sepsis and multi-organ failure.
- Infections in neonates, although rare, can occur and be fatal.

Many environmental factors such as the density of fungi in soil, rainfall, temperature, humidity and types of vegetation in close contact are relevant in determining the likelihood of acquiring hyalohypjomycosis infection by S. strictum. Frequent exposure to contaminated water along with high temperature and humid environments increases the risk of infection.

== Clinical presentation and treatments ==
Clinical presentation of an infection is ill-defined, but most individuals may present a skin rash and flu like symptoms, such as elevated body temperature and fatigue. In more severe infections, such as in immunodeficient individuals, peritonitis and pleuritis, and may lead to multi-organ failure. In the case of invasive infections, surgical intervention may be required to remove fungal mass from body tissues. Due to limited, ill-defined cases and the variance in clinical presentation and species identification, no optimal treatments are available. S. strictum and Acremonium species are generally resistant to most antifungals, but antifungal susceptibility testing is recommended to select the most appropriate treatment for the strain of S. strictum that is the infection agent. Amphotericin B therapy coupled with ketoconazole is usually recommended as the best available treatment.

== Fungal interactions ==
=== Helminthosporium solani ===
S. strictum is generally known as a mycoparasite, as shown in its antagonistic relationship with Helminthosporium solani. H. solani is a potato (Solanum tuberosum) associated fungus, that has caused extreme and widespread losses in all market classes of potatoes since emerging in the United States. Commonly referred to as silver scurf, H. solani causes blemishes that decreases the quality of the crop, making it unfit for marketing. In more severe cases, H. solani causes weight loss in potatoes and creates lesions in the periderm, creating entry points for other tuber pathogens. In pure cultures of H. solani, isolates show white sectoring and rings, differential coloration and reduced sporulation in culture. Upon infection of S. strictum, cultures of H. solani were uniformly black, without white sectors or rings. S. strictum was able to significantly reduce sporulation of H. solani by 30%, spore germination by 20%, and mycelial growth 8% in culture. This evidence suggests that S. strictum may be used as a biological control agent against H. solani, which would greatly increase potato crop yields.

== Plant interactions ==
=== Stalk rot ===
S. strictum is pathogenic to many monocotyledonous and dicotyledonous crops, causing leaf desiccation on one side of the midrib of these plants, plant wilt and abnormal, discoloured vasculature of the stalk near the soil line. Vasculature of the plant forms orange, red and brown bundles, usually resulting in death. Infection of S. strictum is systemic, and the fungus can be isolated from all tissues of the plant. Isolates have been found in plant seeds, which is probably the route of dissemination of the fungus. Crops affected by S. strictum include Acacia, Alnus, Ficus, Glycine, Gossypium, Triticum and Zea. Because of its ubiquitous presence in soils, S. strictum negatively impacts many agricultural plants, although more research is needed to investigate the parasitic interactions and develop strategies for its biological control.

=== Root knot nematode ===
Meloidogyne incognita is a polyphagous nematode that severely damages tomato crops by causing lesions in the roots by using a stylet, which allows other soil-dwelling fungal parasites to infect the host plant and cause complex disease interactions. S. strictum is reported to be a nematode egg parasite, as the eggs of M. incognita infested plants were found to be empty under S. strictum treatment. This treatment of S. strictum coupled with Trichoderma harzianum was found to be a very promising combination in the control of M. incognita in tomato plants.

=== Fragaria ananassa ===
It demonstrates a complicated relationship with strawberry host Fragaria ananassa, in which the fungus may cause lesions and small necrotic, light-brown spots in leaves and petioles which increase as the disease progresses, adversely affecting strawberry crop. Eventually the necrotic regions expand and cause the plant to wilt, but crown rot is not observed at any stage of the infection. Although it appears to have a parasitic relationship with Fragaria ananassa, it also produces an elicitor protein, AsES, which provides systemic protection against anthracnose disease in strawberry host Fragaria ananassa, which shows a symbiotic relationship between the strawberry plant and S. strictum.

=== Atractylodes lancea ===
Atractylodes lancea is a medicinal herb that grows in central China. S. strictum acts as a fungal endophyte and interacts with A. lancea in drought conditions and confers tolerance in moderate drought. Under mild drought conditions, S. strictum enhanced leaf soluble sugars, proteins, proline and antioxidant enzyme activity, which decreased the degree of plasmalemma oxidation. This increased A. lancea abscisic acid level and root:shoot ratio. While S. strictum may alleviate the effects of a mild to moderate drought, benefits of this endophytic relationship are constrained by drought degree, as there were no significant effects of S. strictum on A. lancea during periods of regular watering or severe drought.

=== Maclura cochinchinensis ===
In Maclura cochinchinensis, S. strictum acts as an endophytic fungi that infects primarily the leaves of the plant. In this relationship, S. strictum was found to provide and mediate a protective response against herbivorous insects.

== Natural metabolites ==
=== Acremostrictin ===
Acremostrictin can be isolated from certain strains of S. strictum and is characterized as a highly oxygenated, tricyclic lactone metabolite. This compound exhibits weak antibacterial properties against the bacterium Micrococcus luteus, Salmonella typhimurium and Proteus vulgaris. However, it had no effect on Bacillus subtilis, Staphylococcus aureus and Escherichia coli. Acremostrictin has been shown to have concentration-dependent antioxidant activity, which conferred protection against oxidative stress induced cell death. Acremostrictin was shown to inhibit H_{2}O_{2}-induced death of human keratinocyte HaCaT cells. When extracted and isolated by filtration, acremostrictin presents as a colorless crystal solid.

=== AsES ===
AsES (S. strictum elicitor subtilisin; R4IR27) protein is an extracellular elicitor protein produced by S. strictum that provides complete systemic protection against anthracnose, cause by the fungal species Colletotrichum, in the natural host Fragaria ananassa as well as the non-natural host Arabidopsis thaliana. Anthracnose can affect all plant tissues, and appears as irregular and black leaf spot, flower blight, and fruit and crown rot, which results in serious losses in plant and fruit production. AsES has proteolytic activity that appears to elicit an immune response in these species that results in the accumulation of reactive oxygen species and the expression of defence related genes like PR1 and Chi2-1. Because it has been shown to provide the same systemic protection in non-natural hosts, this natural metabolite of S. strictum may be considered as a possible strategy for controlling anthracnose disease in plants.

=== Cephalosporins ===
S. strictum produces some types of cephalosporins a group of antibiotics.

== Industrial uses ==
=== BMOs ===
Biogenic Mn oxides (BMOs) are naturally occurring Mn oxides that have the ability to oxidize various redox-sensitive elements. S. strictum is a Mn(II)-oxidizing fungus that forms BMOs through the action of Mn(II) oxidase. In the presence of BMOs in buffer solutions with no additional nutrients, S. strictum is capable of sequestering high Mn(II) concentrations for at least 8 days, in which the amount of dissolved Mn(II) decreases rapidly in several hours and is converted to oxidized Mn(II). Deaeration of the buffer solution with N_{2} gas purging suppressed Mn(II) conversion, but this suppression is easily rescued by aeration, implying that dissolved oxygen is required for the Mn(II) sequestration and oxidation process. Adding NaN_{3}, a toxic substance, also significantly reduces the sequestration rates of the fungal BMOs. Heat treatments revealed that temperatures below 85 °C do not alter the conformation of the Mn(II) oxidase in the BMOs. Freezing the fungal BMOs at −80 °C for 4 weeks did not affect the Mn(II) ability, and the reducible Mn was still dominated in solution. This makes fungal BMOs an effective Mn(II) sequestering material if needed. For example, it can be used for the continuous removal of Mn(II) from Mn(II) contaminated water without the need for any additives other than dissolved oxygen. The product is an oxide phase Mn(II) that would provide additional affinity for other toxic elements and thus prove as an effective method of water cleansing. Enzymatically active fungal BMOs can be harvested under specific cultivation conditions and remain active even under circumstances that would be unfavourable for fungal growth.

=== Ginsenoside analogs ===
Fermentation of ginsenoside Rb(1) with S. strictum yields three new compounds — 12β-hydroxydammar-3-one-20 (S)-O-β-D-glucopyranoside, 12β, 25-dihydroxydammar-(E)-20(22)-ene-3-O-β-D -glucopyranosyl-(1→2)-β-D -glucopyranoside, and 12β, 20 (R), 25-trihydroxydammar-3-O-β-D -glucopyranosyl-(1→2)-β-D -glucopyranoside — as well as five known compounds — ginsenoside Rd, gypenoside XVII, ginsenoside Rg, ginsenoside F, and compound K. Many of these compounds are metabolites of ginsenoside Rb(1) in mammals, suggesting that fermentation of ginsenoside Rb(1) in S. strictum may be similar to mammalian metabolism and may be a useful agent for generating specific metabolites or related ginsenoside analogs, which can be later isolated for structural elucidation and use in pharmaceutical research.
