= Sarocladium kiliense =

Scientific classification
- Kingdom: Fungi
- Division: Ascomycota
- Class: Sordariomycetes
- Order: Hypocreales
- Family: Sarocladiaceae
- Genus: Sarocladium
- Species: S. kiliense

Binomial name
- Sarocladium kiliense (Grütz) Summerbell (2011)

Synonyms
- Acremonium kiliense Grütz (1925); Cephalosporium kiliense E. Hartman (1926)

Species of fungus

Sarocladium kiliense is a saprobic fungus that is occasionally encountered as an opportunistic pathogen of humans, particularly in immunocompromised individuals. The fungus is frequently found in soil and has been linked with skin and systemic infections. This species is also known to cause disease in the green alga, Cladophora glomerata as well as various fruit and vegetable crops grown in warmer climates.

== History and taxonomy ==
Sarocladium kiliense was renamed from Acremonium kiliense by Grütz in 1925, and it is particularly known as Cephalosporium acremonium in medical mycology. The name Cephalosporium was used to describe colorless molds with simple unbranched conidiophores and condiogenous cells bearing at the tip or head of the unicellular conidia. For all such molds that had these characteristics, many authors have been using the name C. acremonium. However, in 1971, Walter Gams kept the name A. kiliense to describe the fungus that were frequently found in soil and were associated with skin infections. Other similar fungus were put to a new species called A. strictum.

Gams divided Acremonium into three major sections: Acremonium, Gliomastix, and Nectriodea. Acremonium comprises four major clades: A. sclerotigenum, Sarocladium, A. curvulum, and A. breve. The genus Sarocladium contains multiple species previously treated in Acremonium and those that belong to the A. strictum and A. bacillisporum clades. Sarocladium species are noted for melanogenesis, a pathogenic factor in fungal disease, which is seen in S. kiliense.

== Morphology ==
Colonies of S. kiliense have distinct characteristics, such as its colour, when grown on different medium. When the colonies are grown on glucose peptone agar at a temperature of 30 °C (86 °F), colonies can reach a diameter of 50 mm in one week. The colonies have a flat topography with a grey to an orange coloration. At the microscopic level, predominant features include balls of ellipsoidal conidia accumulated at the ends of long slender phialides and have oval chlamydospores. The conidiophores are long, straight, slightly tapering phialides, arising as side-branches on hyphae. At the end of the phialides are accumulated balls of slimy conidia with an ellipsoidall shape measuring 3-6 x 1.5 mm.

Colonies that are grown on sabouraud dextrose agar have a white coloration that later becomes pink during further incubation. Microscopically, the growth mostly has fasciculate mycelium giving rise to slender phialides. When the colonies are grown on oatmeal agar at a temperature of 2 °C (36 °F) for 10 days, the isolates form poorly differentiated phialides, and single-cells, thick-walled uncoloured chlamydospores with chromophilic walls measuring 4-8 μm in diameter on the ends of hyphae and intervening in filaments. After 7 days of incubation, the chlamydospores become apparent although sclerotia remain absent.

== Ecology and growth conditions ==
Sarocladium kiliense is a fungus that can be found throughout the world and have been seen in various European countries and warmer countries such as Egypt, India, and Nigeria. It is commonly isolated from the soil and seen in cereal fields, hay, apples, endosperm of rye grains, tomatoes, ground nuts, pineapples, and the soils of grass lands. In addition, Sarocladium kiliense have also been found to be an aerial contaminant. Isolates that are grown at higher temperatures have larger colonies than isolates grown at lower temperatures. When colonies are grown on glucose peptone agar at a temperature of 30 °C (86 °F), colonies can reach a diameter of 50 mm in one week. Colonies that are grown at 20 °C (68 °F) on malt extract agar (MEA) form smaller colonies measuring 1.8-2.3 cm in diameter.

== Pathogenicity ==
S. kiliense has been mainly known to be a human opportunistic pathogen and infections have been found to be more frequent in tropical countries. However, in individuals who are immunocompetent, the pathogenicity of S. kiliense is very low. Infection from the fungus usually occurs through a penetrating injury or open wounds that are exposed to the fungus. Since the fungi has the ability to go through the process of melanogenesis, one of the resulting infections is mycetoma. In patients who are immunocompetent, some of the local infections that may be seen are keratitis, endophthalmitis, onychomycosis, granuloma formation, or cutaneous skin infections. On the other hand, individuals who are immunocompromised and are infected by the fungus can face severe systemic infections and may develop peritonitis. In one study, it was found that S. kiliense was reported to invade the lungs. During the study, they were able to look at the blood and see narrow septate hyphae, cylindrical conidia, and other characteristics of S. kiliense. In addition to the lungs, it has also been known to invade the upper respiratory tract mucosa, sinuses, and conjunctiva.

Despite S. kiliense being mainly known as a human and animal pathogen, it also plays a role in plant diseases. It has been noted that they are pathogenic to the green algae, Cladophora glomerata, and isolated in plants such as apples, ground nuts, pineapple, lettuce and fennels. In 2016, in India, it was reported that S. kiliense was responsible for causing fruit rots in pears. When infected pears were examined, they displayed watery discolouration if the interior tissues without any browning. This was the first case that the fungi was known to cause the rotting in pears.

== Diagnosis and treatment ==
Individuals who are infected by S. kiliense, diagnosis can be established by isolating the fungus from the infected region, culturing it, and identifying the fungus’ typical characteristics. Additionally, diagnosis can also be performed through the sequencing of the internal transcribed spacer (ITS) regions of the ribosomal RNA gene (rDNA). Currently, there is no optimal treatment for infections caused S. kiliense since it is resistant to almost all antifungal drugs. S. kiliense infections are difficult to treat and the outcomes are usually fatal. However, there have been successful reports of amphotericin B (AMB) during the treatment of the infection while other cases were unsuccessful. Moreover, the drug voriconazole has also been shown to have success in treating life threatening S. kiliense infections within immunocompromised patients.

== Metabolism ==
In biotechnology, S. kiliense, which use to belong to the genus Cephalosporium produces cephalosporin C, an antibiotic similar to that of penicillin. Moreover, since S. kiliense use to belong to the genus Acremonium, it was noted that species from this genus can degrade polysaccharides, pectin, Carboxymethyl cellulose, xylans, and with S. kiliense mainly degrading starch. Furthermore, the fungus is also known to oxidize manganese in the soil and produce alkaline proteases and amylases.
