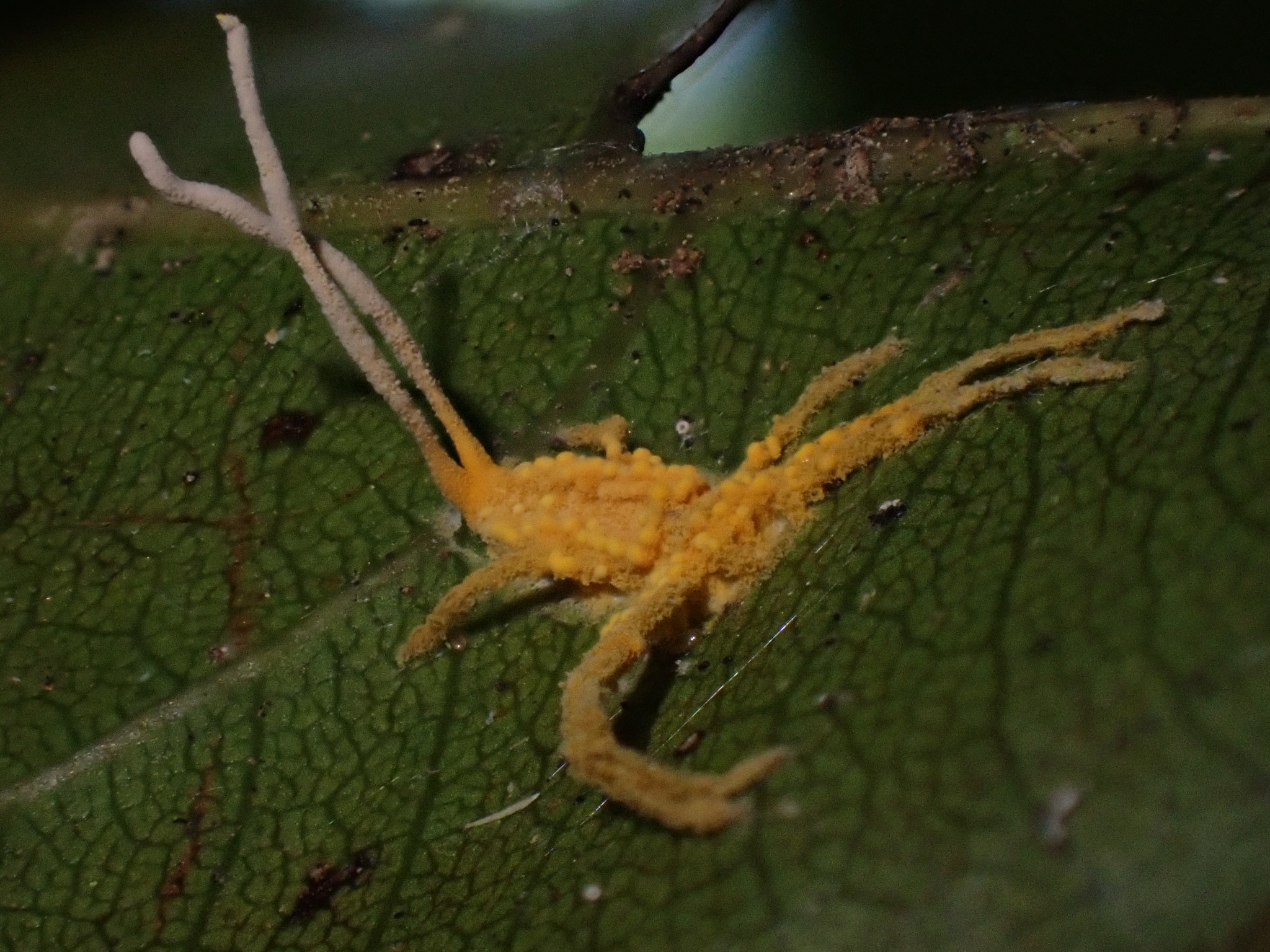
- The sample that Acremonium isabellae was isolated from. It is a spider being consumed by a different fungi to Acremonium isabellae, under a leaf at Rowlands Creek in NSW.
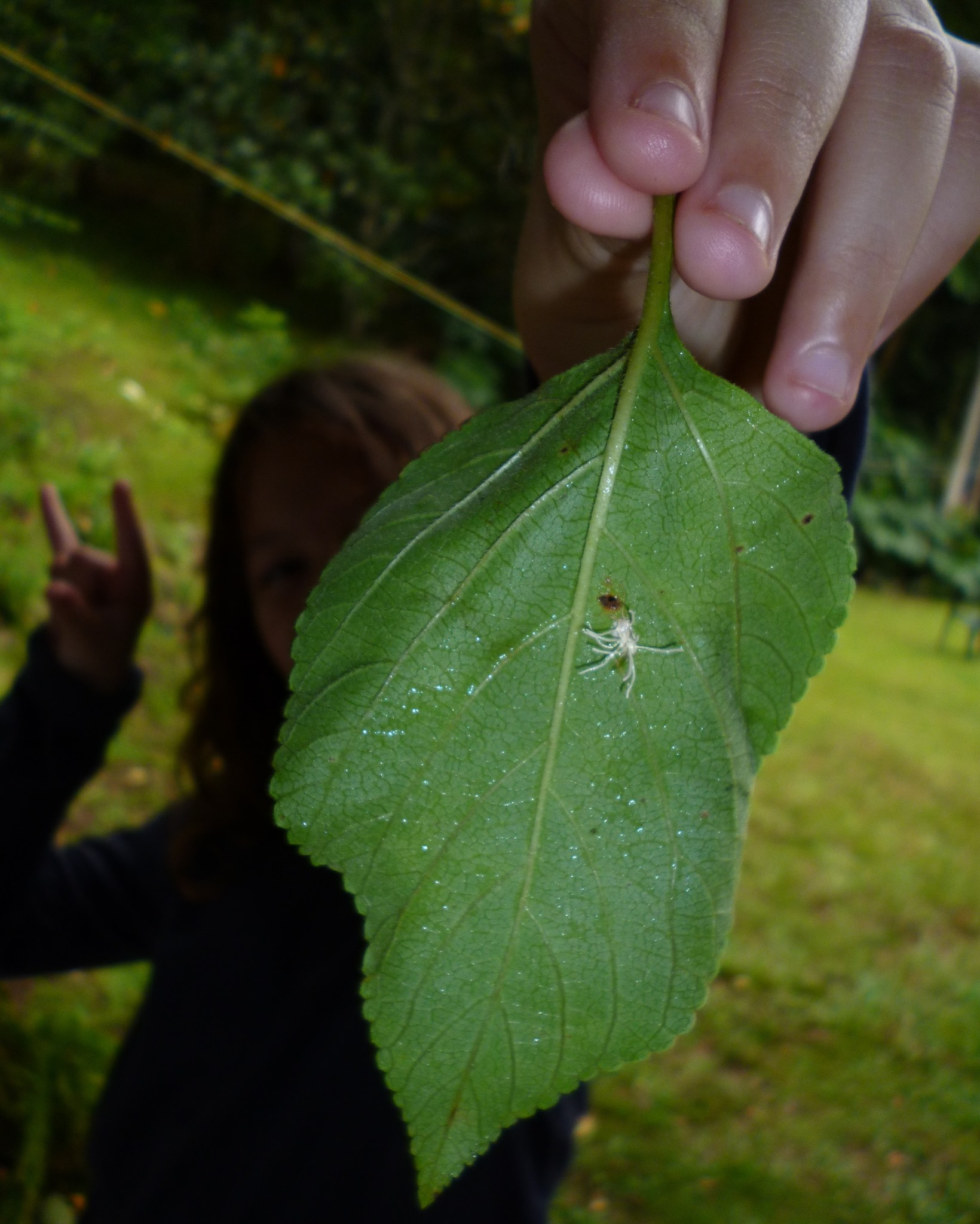

Scientific classification
- Domain: Eukaryota
- Kingdom: Fungi
- Division: Ascomycota
- Class: Sordariomycetes
- Order: Hypocreales
- Family: Hypocreaceae
- Genus: Acremonium
- Species: A. isabellae

Binomial name
- Acremonium isabellae Y.P. Tan, Bishop-Hurley & R.G. Shivas (2023)
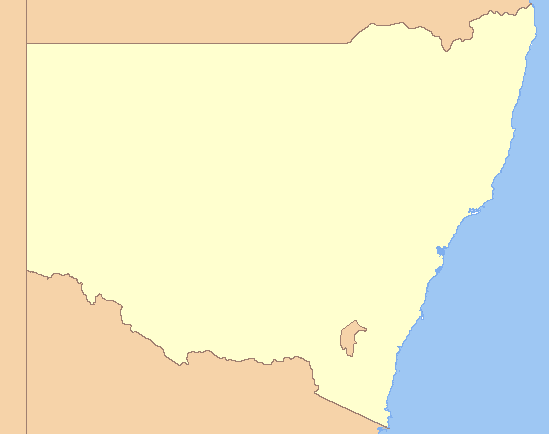

= Acremonium isabellae =

Species of fungus

Acremonium isabellae is a species of fungus in the genus Acremonium. It was discovered at Rowlands Creek near Uki in NE New South Wales in 2023 on the body of a dead spider being consumed by an entomopathogenic fungi. Citizen scientist Isabella Teal discovered the fungus while collecting samples of spider-eating fungi with her father and it was subsequently named after her. It was first described along with other microfungi in the 11 September 2023, Index of Australian Fungi. The sample on which this fungus was identified can be seen arriving at the lab in the 2024 documentary Follow the Rain.

Current Name: Waltergamsia isabellae, Index of Australian Fungi 47: 13 (2024) Synonymy: Acremonium isabellae, Index of Australian Fungi 15: 5 (2023)
