= Tolypocladium inflatum =

Scientific classification
- Kingdom: Fungi
- Division: Ascomycota
- Class: Sordariomycetes
- Order: Hypocreales
- Family: Ophiocordycipitaceae
- Genus: Tolypocladium
- Species: T. inflatum

Binomial name
- Tolypocladium inflatum W.Gams (1971)

Synonyms
- Pachybasium niveum O. Rostr. (1916); Tolypocladium niveum (O. Rostr.) Bissett (1983); Beauveria nivea (O. Rostr.) Arx (1986); Cordyceps subsessilis Petch (1937); Elaphocordyceps subsessilis (Petch) G.H. Sung, J.M. Sung & Spatafora (2007)

Species of fungus

Tolypocladium inflatum is an ascomycete fungus originally isolated from a Norwegian soil sample that, under certain conditions, produces the immunosuppressant drug ciclosporin. In its sexual stage (teleomorph) it is a parasite on scarab beetles. It forms a small, compound ascocarp that arises from the cadaver of its host beetle. In its asexual stage (anamorph) it is a white mold that grows on soil. It is much more commonly found in its asexual stage and this is the stage that was originally given the name Tolypocladium inflatum.

== History ==
In 1969, a soil sample containing microfungi from Norway found by Hans Peter Frey was brought to Switzerland, from which a fungus misidentified as Trichoderma polysporum was isolated. In 1971 the Austrian mycologist Walter Gams re-identified the isolate as a previously unknown microfungus affiliated with the order Hypocreales. He erected the genus Tolypocladium to accommodate the isolate, which he named T. inflatum Gams. The taxon is characterized by swollen phialides, sparingly branched conidiophores, and small, unicellular conidia borne in slimy heads. Canadian mycologist John Bissett re-examined the strain in 1983, finding it to match the species Pachybasium niveum, a fungus described prior to the work of Gams. According to the rules of publication priority for botanical nomenclature, Bissett proposed the combination Tolypocladium niveum. However due to the economic importance of the fungus to the pharmaceutical industry and the fact that the incorrect name had already become well-entrenched, a proposal to formally conserve the name T. inflatum against earlier names was made and accepted, establishing the correct name of the mold that produces ciclosporin as Tolypocladium inflatum.

== Growth and morphology ==
Tolypocladium inflatum occurs most commonly in soil or leaf litter, particularly at high latitudes in cold soils. The species is characterized by spherically swollen phialides that are terminated with narrow necks bearing subglobose conidia. T. inflatum is highly tolerant of lead and has been found to dominate the mycota of lead-contaminated soils. A study conducted by Baath et al. found that 35% of the fungal isolates recovered from lead-laden soil were T. inflatum.

In 1996, Kathie Hodge of Cornell University and colleagues determined that the mold T. inflatum was the asexual state of what was then known as Cordyceps subsessilis. Cordyceps subsessilis was later moved to the genus Elaphocordyceps. However, under the ICN's 2011 "one fungus, one name" principle, fungi can not have different names for their anamorphic and teleomorphic stages if they are found to be the same species so Elaphocordyceps subsessilis was made a synonym of Tolypocladium inflatum.

The genome of the T. inflatum strain/isolate NRRL 8044 (ATCC 34921) was sequenced and published in 2013 by Bushley and colleagues. This was the same strain from which the ciclosporin was first isolated.

== Metabolite production ==
Tolypocladium inflatum is similar to other fungi in the order Hypocreales in generating a variety of biologically active secondary metabolites. Two significant groups of metabolites are produced from T. inflatum: ciclosporins and efrapeptins. Ciclosporin exhibits insecticidal and antifungal properties and is a key immunosuppressant drug used to prevent the rejection of transplanted organs. Ciclosporin A also has the potential use in the treatment of autoimmune diseases. The genome of filamentous T. inflatum contains a 12-gene cluster associated with a repetitive element. Efrapeptins are mitochondrial and prokaryotic ATPase inhibitors that also have insecticidal and antifungal properties. Little is known about the role of these metabolites in the ecology of the fungus. In 2011, Linn and co-workers studied crude extracts of T. inflatum and found that the fungus produced six new secondary metabolites and four other chlamydosporol derivatives.

== Pathogenicity ==
Although Tolypocladium inflatum is chiefly as a soil fungus its sexual state has been encountered as a pathogen of insects and mite pests, specifically beetle larvae and Two-spotted spider mite. Hodge and co-workers suggested that the fungus may have originated as an insect pathogen but evolved over time survive asexually as a facultative soil saprobe. Although T. inflatum has not been shown to affect nematodes, researchers Samson and Soares hypothesized that the Tolypocladium species may have a nematode alternate host. Tolypocladium inflatum has also shown to produce substances that inhibit the in vitro growth of a number of fungal species. Some suggest that T. inflatum may also have the ability to inhibit certain fungal plant pathogens from colonizing their hosts. For example, T. inflatum had a small but significant effect on inhibiting mycorrhiza formation. Furthermore, secondary metabolites isolated from the crude extract of T. inflatum have shown modest cytotoxicity against eight human tumour cell lines including A549 (human lung adenocarcinoma), A375 (human malignant melanoma), and MCF-7 (human breast cancer).

== Medical uses ==
Tolypocladium inflatum has long been of interest in biotechnology due to its production of a relatively non-cytotoxic, natural 11 amino acid cyclic peptide named Ciclosporin A. Ciclosporin is an immunosuppressant drug used in the management of autoimmune diseases and the prevention of rejection in organ transplantation. Ciclosporin A works by targeting and binding with human ciclophilin A. This ciclosporine-ciclophilin binding inhibits calcineurin and effectively inhibits the human immune system. Without calcineurin, the activity of nuclear factor of activated T-cells and transcription regulators of IL-2 in T-lymphocytes is blocked. Ciclosporin A considerably alters the nuclear morphology of in vitro human peripheral blood mononuclear leukocytes from ovoid to a radially splayed lobulated structure. The expression levels of alanine racemase affects the level of cyclosporine production by T. inflatum. Ciclosporin A was first introduced in medical use in the 1970s after an organ transplant to reduce graft rejection. This use was based on cyclosporin's ability to interfere with lymphokine biosynthesis. Ciclosporin A also has anti-inflammatory, antifungal, and antiparasitic abilities. It has been recommended for autoimmune diseases as well as potential treatment for rheumatoid arthritis, type I diabetes, and HIV-1. Despite its use in medicine, cyclosporine A exhibits significant nephrotoxicity, cardiotoxicity, and hepathotoxicity. Drugs containing T. inflatum-produced cyclosporin A are a major product of the pharmaceutical company, Novartis.
