= Thymine dioxygenase =

Identifiers
- EC no.: 1.14.11.6
- CAS no.: 37256-67-0

Databases
- IntEnz: IntEnz view
- BRENDA: BRENDA entry
- ExPASy: NiceZyme view
- KEGG: KEGG entry
- MetaCyc: metabolic pathway
- PRIAM: profile
- PDB structures: RCSB PDB PDBe PDBsum
- Gene Ontology: AmiGO / QuickGO
Search
- PMC: articles
- PubMed: articles
- NCBI: proteins

Thymine dioxygenase (EC 1.14.11.6) is an enzyme that catalyzes the chemical reaction

thymine
Fe(IV)=O
Fe(II)
5-hydroxymethyluracil

The enzyme oxidises thymine to give 5-hydroxymethyluracil.

The enzyme is an alpha-ketoglutarate-dependent hydroxylase with systematic name thymine,2-oxoglutarate:oxygen oxidoreductase (7-hydroxylating). Other names in common use include thymine 7-hydroxylase, 5-hydroxy-methyluracil dioxygenase, and 5-hydroxymethyluracil oxygenase.

== Mechanism ==
The enzyme is a non-heme iron protein with ferryl active site where Fe(IV)=O is the species that transfers its oxygen to the substrate.

The mechanism requires 2-oxoglutaric acid to activate the iron oxygen complex, and this gives succinic acid and carbon dioxide when the second atom of the molecular oxygen is removed. Ascorbic acid is also required to increase the turnover number of the enzyme by reducing any iron converted to Fe(III) back to the required Fe(II).

2-oxoglutaric acid
[O]
CO_{2}
succinic acid
