= Deacetylcephalosporin-C acetyltransferase =

Identifiers
- EC no.: 2.3.1.175

Databases
- IntEnz: IntEnz view
- BRENDA: BRENDA entry
- ExPASy: NiceZyme view
- KEGG: KEGG entry
- MetaCyc: metabolic pathway
- PRIAM: profile
- PDB structures: RCSB PDB PDBe PDBsum
Search
- PMC: articles
- PubMed: articles
- NCBI: proteins

Deacetylcephalosporin-C acetyltransferase (EC 2.3.1.175) is an enzyme that catalyzes the chemical reaction

deacetylcephalosporin C
+ acetyl-CoA
cephalosporin C
+ coenzyme A

The two substrates of this enzyme are deacetylcephalosporin C and acetyl coenzyme A. Its products are cephalosporin C and coenzyme A.

This enzyme belongs to the family of transferases, specifically those acyltransferases transferring groups other than aminoacyl groups. The systematic name of this enzyme class is acetyl-CoA:deacetylcephalosporin-C O-acetyltransferase. Other names in common use include acetyl-CoA:deacetylcephalosporin-C acetyltransferase, DAC acetyltransferase, cefG, deacetylcephalosporin C acetyltransferase, acetyl coenzyme A:DAC acetyltransferase, acetyl-CoA:DAC acetyltransferase, CPC acetylhydrolase, acetyl-CoA:DAC O-acetyltransferase, and DAC-AT. This enzyme catalyses the final step in the conversion of penicillin N to cephalosporin C. The industrial production of cephalosporin C in Acremonium chrysogenum has led to optimisation of this enzyme pathway.
