= N,N-dimethylformamidase =

Class of enzymes

Identifiers
- EC no.: 3.5.1.56
- CAS no.: 104645-73-0

Databases
- BRENDA: enzyme data
- ExPASy: NiceZyme view
- KEGG: enzyme entry
- MetaCyc: metabolic pathway
- Rhea: reactions
- PDB structures: RCSB PDB PDBe PDBsum
- Gene Ontology: AmiGO / QuickGO
Search
- PMC: articles
- PubMed: articles
- NCBI: proteins

N,N-dimethylformamidase (EC 3.5.1.56) is an enzyme characterised from a Pseudomonas species that catalyzes the hydrolysis of dimethylformide to formic acid and ammonia:

dimethylformamide
H_{2}O
HCO_{2}H + (CH_{3})_{2}NH

It has been suggested that this enzyme could be a component of a biological system to remove dimethylformamide from industrial waste water.

This enzyme is a hydrolase, one acting on carbon-nitrogen bonds other than peptide bonds, specifically in linear amides. The systematic name of this enzyme class is N,N-dimethylformamide amidohydrolase. Other names in use include dimethylformamidase, and DMFase. It is a non-heme iron protein.
