= Cerulenin =

Names
- Preferred IUPAC name (2R,3S)-3-[(4E,7E)-Nona-4,7-dienoyl]oxirane-2-carboxamide

Identifiers
CAS Number	17397-89-6
3D model (JSmol)	Interactive image
ChEBI	CHEBI:171741
ChEMBL	ChEMBL45627
ChemSpider	4445281
DrugBank	DB01034
ECHA InfoCard	100.037.643
KEGG	C12058
PubChem CID	5282054
UNII	MF286Y830Q
CompTox Dashboard (EPA)	DTXSID2040995
- InChI: InChI=1S/C12H17NO3/c1-2-3-4-5-6-7-8-9(14)10-11(16-10)12(13)15/h2-3,5-6,10-11H,4,7-8H2,1H3,(H2,13,15)/b3-2+,6-5+/t10-,11-/m1/s1 Key: GVEZIHKRYBHEFX-NQQPLRFYSA-N; InChI=1/C12H17NO3/c1-2-3-4-5-6-7-8-9(14)10-11(16-10)12(13)15/h2-3,5-6,10-11H,4,7-8H2,1H3,(H2,13,15)/b3-2+,6-5+/t10-,11-/m1/s1 Key: GVEZIHKRYBHEFX-NQQPLRFYBP
- SMILES: O=C(CC/C=C/C/C=C/C)[C@H]1O[C@H]1C(=O)N

Properties
Chemical formula	C_{12}H_{17}NO_{3}
Molar mass	223.2695
Density	1.135 g/mL
Boiling point	456.14 °C (853.05 °F; 729.29 K)
- Except where otherwise noted, data are given for materials in their standard state (at 25 °C [77 °F], 100 kPa). verify (what is ?) Infobox references

Cerulenin is an antifungal antibiotic that inhibits fatty acid and steroid biosynthesis. It was the first natural product antibiotic known to inhibit lipid synthesis. In fatty acid synthesis, it has been reported to bind in equimolar ratio to b-keto-acyl-ACP synthase, one of the seven moieties of fatty acid synthase, blocking the interaction of malonyl-CoA. It also has the related activity of stimulating fatty acid oxidation through the activation of CPT1, another enzyme normally inhibited by malonyl-CoA. Inhibition involves covalent thioacylation that permanently inactivates the enzymes. These two behaviors may increase the availability of energy in the form of ATP, perhaps sensed by AMPK, in the hypothalamus.

In sterol synthesis, cerulenin inhibits HMG-CoA synthetase activity. It was also reported that cerulenin specifically inhibited fatty acid biosynthesis in Saccharomyces cerevisiae without having an effect on sterol formation. But in general conclusion, cerulenin has inhibitory effects on sterol synthesis.

Cerulenin causes a dose-dependent decrease in HER2/neu protein levels in breast cancer cells, from 14% at 1.25 to 78% at 10 milligrams per liter, and targeting of fatty acid synthase by related drugs has been suggested as a possible treatment. Antiproliferative and pro-apoptotic effects have been shown in colon cells as well. At an intraperitoneal dose of 30 milligrams per kilogram, it has been shown to inhibit feeding and induce dramatic weight loss in mice by a mechanism similar to, but independent or downstream of, leptin signaling. It is found naturally in the industrial strain Cephalosporium caerulens (Sarocladium oryzae, the sheath rot pathogen of rice).

== See also ==
- Satoshi Ōmura
