= Helmut Gams =

Helmut Gams (1893–1976) was a central European botanist. Born in Brno, he moved to Zürich as a child. He studied at the University of Zurich, being awarded a PhD in 1918. During his career, he worked at the Ludwig-Maximilians-Universität München and the University of Innsbruck. His research saw him pursue fieldwork around Europe and Asia. He was a geobotanist who specialized in the associations of different species of mosses and lichens with each other and the environment. Gams coined the terms 'biocoenology' and 'phytocoenology' in his 1918 PhD thesis.

Two species named after Gams are Phacus gamsii and Rumex gamsii.

Gams's son, Walter Gams (1934–2017), was a mycologist and taxonomist.
