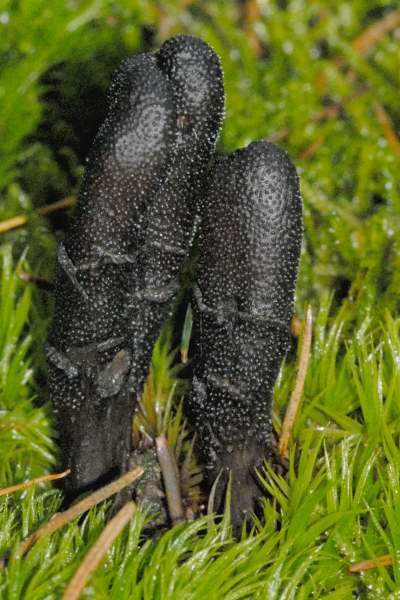
- Tolypocladium ophioglossoides

Scientific classification
- Kingdom: Fungi
- Division: Ascomycota
- Class: Sordariomycetes
- Order: Hypocreales
- Family: Ophiocordycipitaceae
- Genus: Tolypocladium; W. Gams (1971)

Type species
- Tolypocladium inflatum W. Gams (1971)

Species
- See text

Synonyms
- Chaunopycnis W. Gams (1980); Elaphocordyceps G.H. Sung & Spatafora (2007)

= Tolypocladium =

Genus of fungi

Tolypocladium is a genus of fungi within the family Ophiocordycipitaceae. It includes species that are parasites of other fungi, insect pathogens, rotifer pathogens and soil inhabiting species with uncertain ecological roles.

Tolypocladium was originally circumscribed as a genus containing anamorphic fungi. It was later determined that some Cordyceps-like teleomorphic fungi were the teleomorphs of Tolypocladium species. These species were considered to belong in the genus Cordyceps until molecular phylogenetics studies found these species to be more closely related to Ophiocordyceps and were considered to belong in that genus before they were transferred to the new genus Elaphocordyceps by Sung and colleagues in 2007. However, under the ICN's 2011 "one fungus, one name" principle, fungi can not have different names for their anamorphic and teleomorphic stages if they are found to be the same taxon. Quandt and colleagues formally synonymized Tolypocladium and Elaphocordyceps in 2014. Quandt and colleagues also synonymized the anamorphic genus Chaunopycnis with Tolypocladium. The immunosuppressant drug ciclosporin was originally isolated from T. inflatum, and has since been found in other species of Tolypocladium, some of which were formerly placed in Chaunopycnis.

== Species ==
- Tolypocladium album
- Tolypocladium capitatum
- Tolypocladium cylindrosporum
- Tolypocladium delicatistipitatum
- Tolypocladium extinguens
- Tolypocladium fractum
- Tolypocladium geodes
- Tolypocladium inegoense
- Tolypocladium inflatum (alsoTolypocladium niveum)
- Tolypocladium intermedium
- Tolypocladium japonicum
- Tolypocladium jezoense
- Tolypocladium lignicola
- Tolypocladium longicolleum
- Tolypocladium longisegmentum
- Tolypocladium minazukiense
- Tolypocladium miomoteanum
- Tolypocladium nubicola
- Tolypocladium ophioglossoides
- Tolypocladium ovalisporum
- Tolypocladium paradoxum
- Tolypocladium pustulatum
- Tolypocladium ramosum
- Tolypocladium rouxii
- Tolypocladium sinense
- Tolypocladium szemaoense
- Tolypocladium tenuisporum
- Tolypocladium terricola
- Tolypocladium toriharamontanum
- Tolypocladium trigonosporum
- Tolypocladium tundrense
- Tolypocladium valliforme
- Tolypocladium valvatistipitatum
