= Deacetoxycephalosporin-C synthase =

Class of enzymes

deacetoxycephalosporin-C synthase

Identifiers
- EC no.: 1.14.20.1
- CAS no.: 85746-10-7

Databases
- IntEnz: IntEnz view
- BRENDA: BRENDA entry
- ExPASy: NiceZyme view
- KEGG: KEGG entry
- MetaCyc: metabolic pathway
- PRIAM: profile
- PDB structures: RCSB PDB PDBe PDBsum
- Gene Ontology: AmiGO / QuickGO
Search
- PMC: articles
- PubMed: articles
- NCBI: proteins

In enzymology, a deacetoxycephalosporin-C synthase (EC 1.14.20.1) is an enzyme that catalyzes the chemical reaction

penicillin N + 2-oxoglutarate + O_{2} $\rightleftharpoons$ deacetoxycephalosporin C + succinate + CO_{2} + H_{2}O

The 3 substrates of this enzyme are penicillin N, 2-oxoglutarate, and O_{2}, whereas its 4 products are deacetoxycephalosporin C, succinate, CO_{2}, and H_{2}O.

== Classification ==
This enzyme belongs to the family of oxidoreductases, specifically those acting on paired donors, with O2 as oxidant and incorporation or reduction of oxygen. The oxygen incorporated need not be derived from O2 with 2-oxoglutarate as one donor, and the other dehydrogenated.

== Nomenclature ==
The systematic name of this enzyme class is penicillin-N,2-oxoglutarate:oxygen oxidoreductase (ring-expanding). Other names in common use include DAOCS, penicillin N expandase, and DAOC synthase.

== Biological role ==
This enzyme is involved in the biosynthesis of cephalosporin C in Acremonium chrysogenum, which is used for the industrial production of that antibiotic.

== Structural studies ==
As of late 2007, 7 structures have been solved for this class of enzymes, with PDB accession codes 1UNB, 1UO9, 1UOB, 1UOF, 1UOG, 1W28, and 1W2A.
