= Cerebritis =

Inflammation of the cerebrum

Cerebritis is the inflammation of the cerebrum, which performs a number of important functions, such as memory and speech. It is also defined as a purulent nonencapsulated parenchymal infection of the brain which is characterized by nonspecific features on CT scans (ill-defined low density area with peripheral enhancement) and cannot reliably be distinguished from neoplasms.

Cerebritis usually occurs as a result of an underlying condition, which causes the inflammation of the brain tissue. It is commonly found in patients with lupus. Lupus cerebritis may occur in adults and children. The duration of the central nervous system involvement may vary from a few minutes, as in classic migraine or a transient ischemic attack, to years, as in dementia. Resulting neurological deficits may be transient or permanent, occasionally resulting in death.

== Symptoms ==
The symptoms of cerebritis may range from mild to severe.

The severity of the symptoms varies based on the degree of swelling and on how elevated is the intracranial pressure. Mild symptoms include headaches, depression, anxiety and in some cases, memory loss. In some cases, inflammation of the brain can be seen if the brain or the nervous system is attacked as a result of problems with the immune system. The serious problems caused because of inflammation include headaches, seizures, vision problems, dizziness, behavior changes and even stroke.

Severe lupus cerebritis symptoms include psychosis, dementia, peripheral neuropathy, cerebellar ataxia (failure of muscular coordination, usually on one side of the body), and chorea (jerky, involuntary movements). Stroke incidence is 3–20% in systemic lupus patients, and is highest in the first five years of the disease. Peripheral neuropathy (carpal tunnel syndrome, for example) occurs in more than 20% of systemic lupus patients and cranial nerve palsies occur in 10–15%.

== Causes ==
Systemic lupus erythematosus (SLE) is one of the most common causes of cerebritis as it is believed that more than half of the patients with lupus from the United States suffer from a degree or another of lupus cerebritis.

The exact pathophysiological process of lupus cerebritis is unknown. The proposed mechanisms are likely due to the assault of several autoimmune system changes, including the following:

- Circulating immune complexes. The immune complexes, which consist of DNA and anti-DNA, cause an inflammatory response as well as a disruption of the blood–brain barrier. These circulating complexes have been found trapped in the highly vascular choroid plexus of SLE patients upon autopsy. True vasculitis, however, is found only in about 10% of patients with cerebral lupus.
- Anti-neuronal antibodies. The three identified anti-neuronal antibodies postulated in CNS involvement are the lympho-cytotoxic antibodies (LCAs), which somehow react with brain tissue and interfere with the neuron's ability to respond. LCAs have a specific role and are found in both the serum and cerebrospinal fluid (CSF) of lupus patients with cerebritis. These antibodies also correlate with cognitive and visual spatial defects. Second, the anti-neuronal membrane antibodies are targeted directly to neuronal antigens. They, too, are found in the serum of SLE patients with cerebritis. And third, the intracytoplasmic antibodies target the constituents of the neuron cells and they are found in the CSF and serum. These antibodies are seen in 90% of SLE patients with psychosis.
- Antiphospholipid antibodies. The two antibodies implicated are anti-cardiolipin and lupus anticoagulant. Anti-cardiolipin antibodies attach to the endothelial lining of cells, causing endothelial damage, platelet aggregation, inflammation, and fibrosis.
- Cytokine release. The final mechanism of lupus cerebritis involves the cytokines. The cytokines trigger edema, endothelial thickening, and infiltration of neutrophils in brain tissue. Two cytokines, interferon alpha and interleukin-6, have been found in the CSF of SLE patients with psychosis.

However, it is not clear which mechanism is the actual cause of cerebritis in lupus patients. Specialists believe that all mechanisms may be present at the same time or they may act independently.

In very rare cases, cerebritis may occur as a result of a Klebsiella pneumoniae infection.

One other reason to develop cerebritis is an infection caused by bacteria, viruses, or other organisms. Infections can occur when infectious agents enter the brain through the sinuses or as a result of trauma. Some pathogens are also capable of passing over the blood–brain barrier and entering the brain through the bloodstream, despite the fact that the body has evolved defenses which are specifically designed to prevent this.

== Diagnosis ==
Lumbar puncture to establish the cause.

== Treatment ==
Lupus is a condition with no known cure. Lupus cerebritis, however, is treated by suppressing the autoimmune activity.

When it is caused by infections, treatment consists of medication that will primarily cure the infection. For inflammation, steroids can be used to bring down the swelling. If the swelling appears to have increased to a dangerous level, surgery may be needed to relieve pressure on the brain. The formation of an abscess also calls for surgery, as it will be necessary to drain the abscess.
