= Rowlands Creek, New South Wales =

Rowlands Creek New South Wales
- Coordinates: 28°27′44″S 153°20′35″E
- Population: 84 (2021 census)
- Postcode(s): 2484
- LGA(s): Tweed Shire
- State electorate(s): Tweed
- Federal division(s): Richmond

Rowlands Creek is a locality in the Tweed Shire of New South Wales, Australia. It had a population of 84 as of the 2021 census.

== Demographics ==
As of the 2021 Australian census, 84 people resided in Rowlands Creek, up from 74 in the 2016 census. The median age of persons in Rowlands Creek was 59 years. There were fewer males than females, with 49.4% of the population male and 50.6% female. The average household size was 1.8 people per household.
