= Walter Gams =

Austrian mycologist (1934–2017)

Konrad Walter Gams
- Born: 9 August 1934; Zurich
- Died: 9 April 2017 (aged 82)
- Resting place: Bomarzo, Italy
- Citizenship: Austrian
- Education: University of Zurich (MSc); University of Innsbruck
- Spouse: Sophia Aaltine Luinge
- Children: Two daughters
- Awards: Mycologist Award of the Mycological Society of America (2005); Anton de Bary medal of the Deutschen Phytomedizinischen Gesellschaft (2012)
- Scientific career
- Fields: Mycology
- Workplaces: Westerdijk Fungal Biodiversity Institute
- Author abbrev. (botany): W.Gams

Konrad Walter Gams (9 August 1934 – 9 April 2017) was an Austrian mycologist. He worked as a scientist for his entire career at the Centraalbureau voor Schimmelcultures (Westerdijk Fungal Biodiversity Institute) in the Netherlands. He served in the international authority on classification of fungi, the Special Committee on Fungi and Lichens (renamed Nomenclatural Committee for Fungi), from which he contributed to the development of the International Code of Nomenclature for algae, fungi and plants. Some species of fungi he identified became sources of pharmaceutical drugs such as cephalosporin C (antibiotic) from Sarocladium strictum and Acremonium chrysogenum, and ciclosporin (immunosuppressant) from Tolypocladium inflatum.

== Biography ==
Gams was born in Zurich, Switzerland, to Helmut Gams and Margarete Gams-Schima. His father, originally from Brünn (now Brno in the Czech Republic), was a botanist and a professor at the Ludwig-Maximilians-Universität München, Germany, and then at the University of Innsbruck, Austria. He studied botany in his father's department for his bacherlor's degree. He went to the University of Zurich to study under his uncle Emil Schmid for his master's degree. He returned to Innsbruck and obtained a PhD in 1960. With a post-doctoral scholarship, he went to UK to work with Dennis Parkinson, a microbiologist at the University of Liverpool.

In 1961, Gams was recruited as a research associate by Klaus Heinz Domsch at the research institute, Biologischen Bundesanstalt für Land-und Forstwirtschaft (Federal Biological Research Centre for Agriculture and Forestry) in Kiel-Kitzeberg, Germany. His works with Domsch on fungal diversity was documented in several books and research articles, including two monumental monographs, Fungi in Agricultural Soils (1971, original in German in 1970) and Compendium of Soil Fungi (in two volumes, first published in 1980). Together they discovered novel fungal species such as Paraphaeosphaeria sporulosa and Podila (Mortierella) epigama. Gams left Biologischen Bundesanstalt to join the Centraalbureau voor Schimmelcultures at Baarn (renamed as Westerdijk Fungal Biodiversity Institute and relocated at Utrecht) in the Netherlands. He worked there until his retirement in 1999.

Since 1984, Gams became a permanent member of the Nomenclature Committee for Fungi (a part of the International Botanical Congress) that maintains the International Code of Nomenclature for algae, fungi and plants. He served as the committee's secretary for several years. He published over 300 publications, including six books, created one new order, 10 new families, 57 generic names, and 622 species epithets. Three genera and 39 species were named after him.

Among Gams's discoveries of fungal species, Acremonium chrysogenum, Sarocladium strictum, and Tolypocladium inflatum become important in pharmceutical science and industry as they are sources of clinical drugs. Acremonium chrysogenum and Sarocladium strictum produced cephalosporin C, one of the most widely used antibiotics, and which in turn is the source several related cephalosporins. Tolypocladium inflatum is the source of ciclosporin A, which is used as immunosuppressant and is approved for use in atopic dermatitis in dogs and allergic dermatitis in cats.

== Personal life ==
Gams never used his first name and even shunned it as his initial. Although he spent most of his lifetime in the Netherlands, he remained an Austrian citizen throughout life. In 1972, he married Sophia Aaltine Luinge with whom he had two daughters, Hedi (Hedwig) and Hilde (Mechthilde). He and Sophia were passionate musicians, playing and composing several classical and folk music at different occasions.

Gams founded a charity programme called "Studienstiftung mykologische Systematik und Ökologie" in 1995 for educational funding of young mycologists, particularly from poor backgrounds. The foundation is now administered by the Deutschsprachige Mykologische Gesellschaft (German Mycological Society).

== Awards and honours ==
- Honorary members of British Mycological Society, Iranian Mycological Society, and Mycological Society of America
- Distinguished Mycologist Award of the Mycological Society of America (2005)
- Anton de Bary medal of the Deutschen Phytomedizinischen Gesellschaft (2012)
