= Non-heme iron protein =

In biochemistry, non-heme iron proteins describe families of enzymes that utilize iron at the active site but lack heme cofactors. Iron-sulfur proteins, including those that are enzymes, are not included in this definition. By tradition, non-heme iron enzymes refers to those involved in oxygen activation, such as those described below.

Some non-heme iron proteins contain one Fe at their active sites, others have pairs of Fe centers:

- Many mono-Fe proteins are alpha-ketoglutarate-dependent hydroxylases. Major examples are the lipoxygenases, isopenicillin N synthase, protocatechuate 3,4-dioxygenase, deacetoxycephalosporin-C synthase, and aromatic amino acid hydroxylases.

Illustrative transformation catalyzed by a non-heme iron protein.

- Diiron enzymes include hemerythrin, some ribonucleotide reductases, and some methane monooxygenases, Some of these active sites are mixed valence (Fe(II)Fe(III)) and some are diferrous (Fe(II)Fe(II)).

Oxygenation of hemerythrin, a non-heme diiron protein.

== Other non-heme iron proteins ==
- purple acid phosphatases
- ferritin.
- Iron-binding proteins
