= Hyalohyphomycosis =

Type of fungal infections

- Specialty: Infectious diseases

Hyalohyphomycosis is a group of opportunistic mycotic infections caused by nondematiaceous molds, and may be contrasted with phaeohyphomycosis. A hyalohyphomycetes example is Fusarium.

== See also ==
- Acremonium
- List of cutaneous conditions
