= Cephalosporin C =

Names
- IUPAC name 3-[(Acetyloxy)methyl]-7β-(N^{6}-L-homoglutamino)-3,4-didehydrocepham-4-carboxylic acid
- Systematic IUPAC name (6R,7R)-3-[(Acetyloxy)methyl]-7-[(5R)-5-amino-5-carboxypentanamido]-8-oxo-5-thia-1-azabicyclo[4.2.0]oct-2-ene-2-carboxylic acid
- Other names 7-(5-Amino-5-carboxyvaleramido)cephalosporanic acid

Identifiers
CAS Number	61-24-5
3D model (JSmol)	Interactive image
ChEBI	CHEBI:15776
ChEMBL	ChEMBL482858
ChemSpider	58980
ECHA InfoCard	100.000.456
KEGG	C00916
PubChem CID	65536
UNII	3XIY7HJT5L
CompTox Dashboard (EPA)	DTXSID90960427
- InChI: InChI=1S/C16H21N3O8S/c1-7(20)27-5-8-6-28-14-11(13(22)19(14)12(8)16(25)26)18-10(21)4-2-3-9(17)15(23)24/h9,11,14H,2-6,17H2,1H3,(H,18,21)(H,23,24)(H,25,26)/t9-,11-,14-/m1/s1 Key: HOKIDJSKDBPKTQ-GLXFQSAKSA-N; InChI=1/C16H21N3O8S/c1-7(20)27-5-8-6-28-14-11(13(22)19(14)12(8)16(25)26)18-10(21)4-2-3-9(17)15(23)24/h9,11,14H,2-6,17H2,1H3,(H,18,21)(H,23,24)(H,25,26)/t9-,11-,14-/m1/s1 Key: HOKIDJSKDBPKTQ-GLXFQSAKBW
- SMILES: O=C2N1/C(=C(\CS[C@@H]1[C@@H]2NC(=O)CCC[C@H](C(=O)O)N)COC(=O)C)C(=O)O

Properties
Chemical formula	C_{16}H_{21}N_{3}O_{8}S
Molar mass	415.42 g·mol^{−1}
- Except where otherwise noted, data are given for materials in their standard state (at 25 °C [77 °F], 100 kPa). Infobox references

Cephalosporin C is an antibiotic of the cephalosporin class. It was isolated from a fungus of the genus Acremonium and first characterized in 1961. Although not a very active antibiotic itself, synthetic analogs of cephalosporin C, such as cefalotin, became some of the first marketed cephalosporin antibiotic drugs.

Cephalosporin C strongly absorbs ultraviolet light, is stable to acid, is non-toxic and has in vivo activity in mice. Cephalosporin C, which has a similar structure to penicillin N, was never commercialized.

Cephalosporin C was a lead compound for the discovery and production of many other cephalosporins. Cephalosporins are drugs used for some people who are allergic to penicillin.

== Uses ==
Cephalosporins are used to treat bacterial infections such as respiratory tract infections, skin infections and urinary tract infections. When a cephalosporin or any other antibiotic is given as a treatment, the medication should be taken for the fully prescribed time even if symptoms disappear.

== Mechanism of action ==
Cephalosporin C acts by inhibiting penicillin binding proteins.

== Side effects ==
These are allergic reactions to the drug and require medical attention:

- itching
- swelling
- dizziness
- rash
- trouble breathing
- vomiting
- severe stomach cramps
- bloody diarrhea
- fever
- weakness
- fast heartbeat

== Chemistry ==
Cephalosporin C has weak activity to the staphylococci infection, which was 0.1% activity. This decrease in activity was due to the replacement of the D-α-aminoadipic acid side chain with phenylacetic acid.

== Biochemistry ==
Cephalosporin C is the product of a natural biosynthesis pathway that starts with penicillin N (also called adicillin).

penicillin N
DAOCS
deacetoxycephalosporin C
DACS
deacetylcephalosporin C
DAC-AT
cephalosporin C

Industrial production uses a strain of the fungus Acremonium chrysogenum which has been optimised by molecular biology techniques to give a high yield of cephalosporin C. The enzymes involved are deacetoxycephalosporin-C synthase (DAOCS), deacetoxycephalosporin-C hydroxylase (DACS) and deacetylcephalosporin-C acetyltransferase (DAC-AT).
