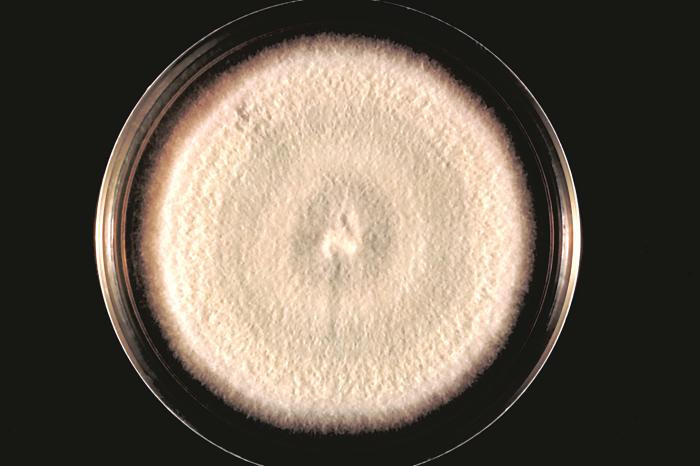
- Plate culture of Acremonium falciforme

Scientific classification
- Kingdom: Fungi
- Division: Ascomycota
- Class: Sordariomycetes
- Order: Hypocreales
- Family: Hypocreaceae
- Genus: Acremonium; Link (1809)

Type species
- Acremonium alternatum Link (1809)

Synonyms
- Cephalosporium

= Acremonium =

Genus of fungi

Acremonium is a genus of fungi in the family Hypocreaceae. It used to be known as Cephalosporium.

== Description ==
Acremonium species are usually slow-growing and are initially compact and moist. Their hyphae are fine and hyaline, and produce mostly simple phialides. Their conidia are usually one-celled (i.e. ameroconidia), hyaline or pigmented, globose to cylindrical, and mostly aggregated in slimy heads at the apex of each phialide.

Epichloë species are closely related and were once included in Acremonium, but were later split off into a new genus Neotyphodium, which has now been restructured within the genus Epichloë.

== Clinical significance ==
The genus Acremonium contains about 100 species, of which most are saprophytic, being isolated from dead plant material and soil. Many species are recognized as opportunistic pathogens of human and animals, causing eumycetoma, onychomycosis, and hyalohyphomycosis. Infections of humans by fungi of this genus are rare, but clinical manifestations of hyalohyphomycosis caused by Acremonium may include arthritis, osteomyelitis, peritonitis, endocarditis, pneumonia, cerebritis, and subcutaneous infection.

The cephalosporins, a class of β-lactam antibiotics, were first discovered in Acremonium by the Italian pharmacologist Giuseppe Brotzu in 1948.

Some species in the genus Acremonium, such as Acremonium egyptiacum, can produce the meroterpenoids Ascofuranone and Ascochlorin, which have promising capabilities as antibiotics.

== Species ==
- Acremonium acutatum
- Acremonium alabamense
- Acremonium alcalophilum
- Acremonium alternatum
- Acremonium antarcticum
- Acremonium apii
- Acremonium arxii
- Acremonium atrogriseum
- Acremonium bacillisporum
- Acremonium bactrocephalum
- Acremonium biseptum
- Acremonium blochii
- Acremonium borodinense
- Acremonium brachypenium
- Acremonium breve
- Acremonium brunnescens
- Acremonium byssoides
- Acremonium camptosporum
- Acremonium cavaraeanum
- Acremonium charticola
- Acremonium chilense
- Acremonium chrysogenum
- Acremonium crotocinigenum
- Acremonium cucurbitacearum
- Acremonium curvulum
- Acremonium cymosum
- Acremonium dichromosporum
- Acremonium diospyri
- Acremonium domschii
- Acremonium egyptiacum
- Acremonium exiguum
- Acremonium falciforme
- Acremonium flavum
- Acremonium furcatum
- Acremonium fusidioides
- Acremonium fusisporum
- Acremonium gamsii
- Acremonium glaucum
- Acremonium guillematii
- Acremonium hansfordii
- Acremonium hennebertii
- Acremonium hyalinulum
- Acremonium hypholomatis
- Acremonium implicatum
- Acremonium incoloratum
- Acremonium incrustatum
- Acremonium isabellae
- Acremonium kiliense
- Acremonium lichenicola
- Acremonium lindtneri
- Acremonium lolii
- Acremonium longisporum
- Acremonium masseei
- Acremonium minutisporum
- Acremonium nectrioidea
- Acremonium nepalense
- Acremonium nigrosclerotium
- Acremonium ochraceum
- Acremonium olidum
- Acremonium persicinum
- Acremonium pinkertoniae
- Acremonium polychromum
- Acremonium potronii
- Acremonium psammosporum
- Acremonium pseudozeylanicum
- Acremonium psychrophilum
- Acremonium pteridii
- Acremonium radiatum
- Acremonium recifei
- Acremonium restrictum
- Acremonium rhabdosporum
- Acremonium roseogriseum
- Acremonium roseolum
- Acremonium rutilum
- Acremonium salmoneum
- Acremonium sclerotigenum
- Acremonium sordidulum
- Acremonium spicatum
- Acremonium spinosum
- Acremonium strictum
- Acremonium stromaticum
- Acremonium tectonae
- Acremonium thermophilum
- Acremonium tsugae
- Acremonium tubakii
- Acremonium typhinum
- Acremonium uncinatum
- Acremonium verruculosum
- Acremonium vitellinum
- Acremonium zeae
- Acremonium zeylanicum
- Acremonium zonatum

== See also ==
- Chaetomium
- Epichloë
