= Phialide =

Flask-shaped projection from the vesicle of certain fungi

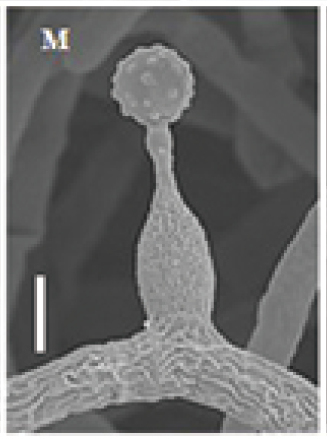
phialide of Ophiocordyceps termiticola

The phialide (/ˈfaɪəlaɪd/ FY-ə-lyde; Greek: phialis, diminutive of phiale, a broad, flat vessel) is a flask-shaped projection from the vesicle (dilated part of the top of conidiophore) of certain fungi. It projects from the mycelium without increasing in length unless a subsequent increase in the formation of conidia occurs.

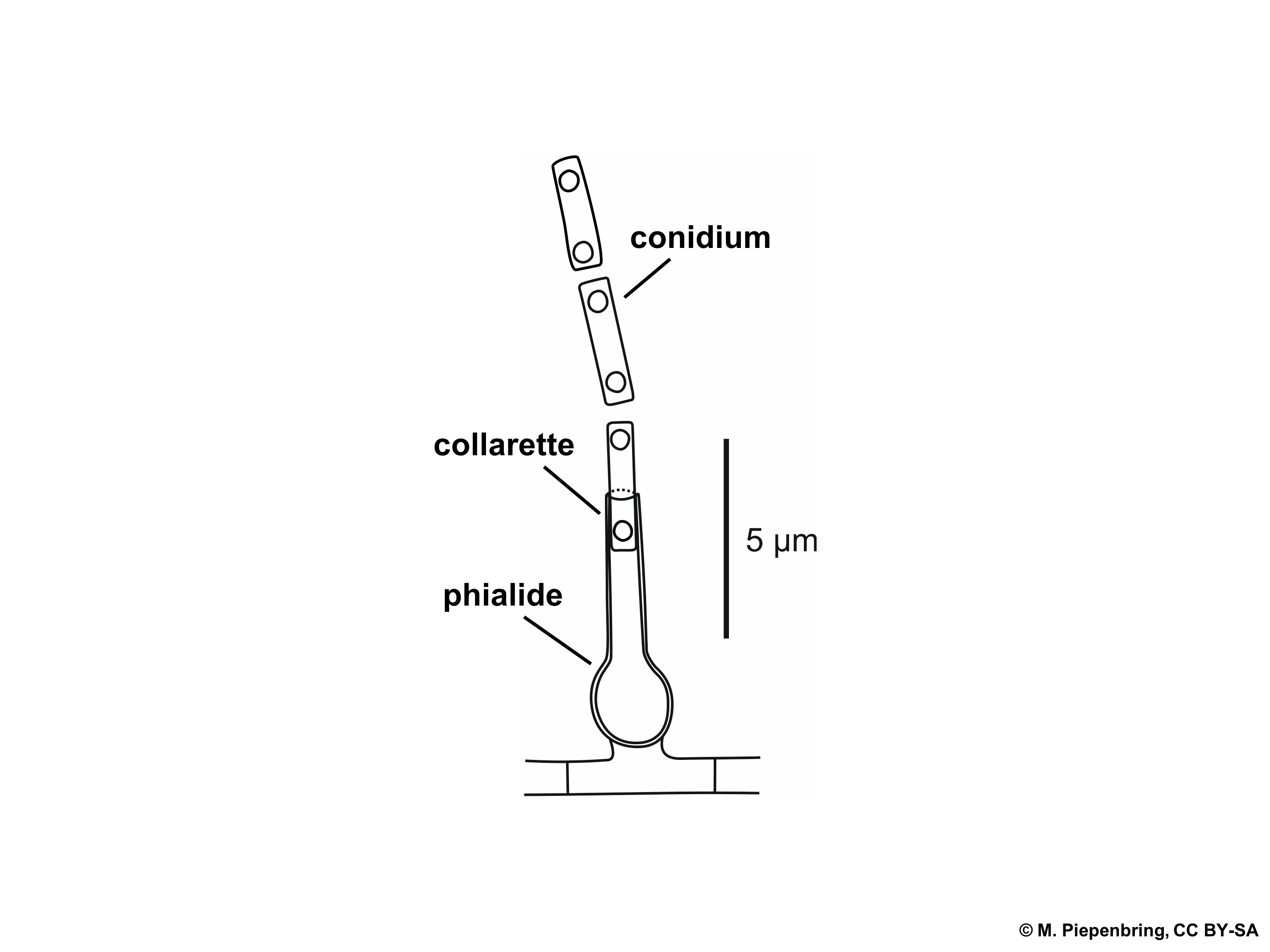
Diagram showing the phialide with other structures

It is the end cell of a phialosphore.

== See also ==
- Ascomycete
