= Melanopsammella =

Scientific classification
- Kingdom: Fungi
- Division: Ascomycota
- Class: Sordariomycetes
- Order: Chaetosphaeriales
- Family: Chaetosphaeriaceae
- Genus: Melanopsammella; Höhn.

Type species
- Melanopsammella inaequalis (Current name:Chaetosphaeria inaequalis) (Grove) Höhn.

Genus of fungi

Melanopsammella is genus of fungi within the Chaetosphaeriaceae family. It contains the species Melanopsammella gonytrichii, with all other species in this genus currently known as Chaetosphaeria.
