= Coniochaeta hoffmannii =

Scientific classification
- Kingdom: Fungi
- Division: Ascomycota
- Class: Sordariomycetes
- Order: Coniochaetales
- Family: Coniochaetaceae
- Genus: Coniochaeta
- Species: C. hoffmannii

Binomial name
- Coniochaeta hoffmannii (J.F.H.Beyma) Khan, Gené and Guarro 2013

Synonyms
- Lecythophora hoffmannii (J.F.H.Beyma) W.Gams & McGinnis (1983); Phialophora hoffmannii (J.F.H.Beyma) Schol-Schwarz (1970); Margarinomyces hoffmannii J.F.H.Beyma (1938)

Species of fungus

Coniochaeta hoffmannii, also known as Lecythophora hoffmannii, is an ascomycete fungus that grows commonly in soil. It has also been categorized as a soft-rot fungus capable of bringing the surface layer of timber into a state of decay, even when safeguarded with preservatives. Additionally, it has pathogenic properties, although it causes serious infection only in rare cases. A plant pathogen lacking a known sexual state, C. hoffmannii has been classified as a "dematiaceous fungus" despite its contradictory lack of pigmentation; both in vivo and in vitro, there is no correlation between its appearance and its classification.

== History ==
Coniochaeta hoffmannii was originally described by J.F.H. van Beyma in 1939 as Margarinomyces hoffmannii. The genus Lecythophora, originally described by John Axel Nannfeldt in 1934, was reintroduced by Konrad Walter Gams and Michael R. McGinnis to accommodate this species in 1983. In 2013, Lecythophora was recombined with Coniochaeta, with all species transferred to the latter genus.

== Ecology ==
=== Occurrence ===
Coniochaeta hoffmannii is a plant pathogen that commonly inhabits fertile soil. It is also known as an agent of soft-rot wood in terrestrial and aquatic environments, it is known to colonize wood surfaces through the use of soft rot hyphae.

=== Environmental Interactions ===
In soil, C. hoffmannii is thought primarily to be a decomposer of wood. To this end, C. hoffmannii is one of, if not the most important fungal agents of soft rot in preservative-treated wood. It, along with soft rot species of other genera, is known to metabolize aromatic compounds of low molecular mass; this includes nine phenolic compounds metabolized by C. hoffmannii itself, such as p-hydroxybenzoic acid, vanillic acid, and vanillin, to name a few. This allows for the utilization of part of the amorphous granular material, found in said phenolic compounds, which contains the lignin breakdown products produced in soft-rot activities.

Decay of wood by soft rot fungi such as C. hoffmannii occurs in one of two ways: either the enzymes released from the hyphae on the lumen surface of the wood cell wall erode it, or the cavities around the hyphae in the S_{2}region of the cell wall get excavated. The cavity itself is created by the enzymatic activity along the length of the hyphae after its growth.

== Morphology ==
As a former member of the genus Lecythophora, it was considered to be poorly differentiated morphologically. Coniochaeta hoffmannii colonies range in colour from a pale salmon to a pallid orange, with degenerate strains presenting a creamy white colour. Colonies are also flat, smooth and moist. Collarettes are distinct, yet unpigmented, while conidia are also hyaline, smooth, and thin-walled. The production of slimy, orange- to salmon-colored colonies on short adelophialides (phialides lacking a basal septum) with cylindrical collarettes can be quite distinct, with ventricose phialide formations less frequent. Narrow and hyaline, hyphae, through the use of small collarettes, produce conidia directly upon them laterally, directly upon the vegetative hyphae. Alternatively, flask-shaped lateral cells, which are practically cylindrical, can serve as the medium through which conidia are produced; they are sometimes found to be arranged in densely packed groups. Conidia are slightly curved, appearing broadly ellipsoidal to cylindrical to bean-shaped; measurements vary from 3.5–7.0 μm in length by 1.0–2.5 μm in width, to 3.0–3.5 μm by 1.5–2.5 μm.

=== Ultrastructure ===
There are multiple types of hyphae within C. hoffmannii. Ones to note are fine soft rot hyphae, T-branch hyphae and proboscis hyphae. T-branch hyphae, which penetrate the wood cell wall, arise from lumen-colonizing hyphae. During early stages of their development, T-branch hyphae contain few cellular organelles; later on in that development, the T-branch arms elongate, complexifying the internal organization of the hyphae. The tip of the T-branch is lacking in hyphal distortion, as well. Proboscis hyphae, when young, exhibit a similar ultrastructural organization and overall diameter to young T-branch hyphae upon emergence from the cone region of parent cavities. They are also fine (only 0.24 μm in diameter (0.34 μm diam including the fungal cell wall) with the tips showing an electron-dense zone. The occurrence of membrane configurations at the base of fine hyphae within proboscis hyphae has importance when it comes to the transport and release of extracellular lytic enzymes. Hyphal diameter is measured to be 0.87 to 1.82 μm.

== Physiology ==
Intolerant to benomyl, C. hoffmannii is capable of proteolytic activity (hydrolysis, in particular), with proteolytic enzymes detected in cultures of C. hoffmannii with various media, including Loeffler blood serum, and skim milk and Litmus milk. Coniochaeta hoffmannii is also quite wikt:thermotolerant, easily growing at 30 and 35 °C, with two out of four isolates (both environmental) growing at 40 °C.

== Disease ==
Despite being one of only two species of medical interest within the genus Coniochaeta, Coniochaeta hoffmannii is rarely encountered as a pathogen primarily due to its related taxa. It is one of the more predominant species of its genus concerning the number of clinical cases reporting infection, having been associated with cases of subcutaneous infections, keratitis, sinusitis, and peritonitis. Coniochaeta hoffmannii rarely causes disease, but when it does, it is only seen in immunocompromised patients, thus marking it as an opportunistic fungal pathogen. Other identifying factors for opportunistic pathogens like this include an association with other underlying diseases capable of compromising the host's immune system, an association with new therapeutic modalities, and cases of invasive fungal sinusitis with no determinable predisposing factors. While great advances in medical technology have decreased previously high rates of morbidity and mortality, the amount and variation of opportunistic pathogens has also increased.

Coniochaeta hoffmannii has been inculpated in human phaeohyphomycosis, leading to the aforementioned abscesses, sinusitis, and mastoiditis, to name a few. It has also been implicated as a food contaminant, which could explain how people or animals interact with it in their respective environments.

=== Human ===
In rare cases, C. hoffmannii has demonstrated its ability to cause serious infection; in one case, it actually induced chronic sinusitis in an AIDS patient. The patient in question was immunocompromised and thus severely immunodeficient due to contracting the human immunodeficiency virus; this allowed for the fungal pathogen to not only infect the patient (where an intact immune system would have made an infection by C. hoffmannii a non-issue), but inflict a recurrent, chronic disease such as sinusitis.

Coniochaeta hoffmannii has also been isolated as a pure growth fungal aggregate from a human gluteal abscess; it actually develops an aggregate not only after treatment is attempted (in this case, for a respiratory tract infection, where various antibacterial drug treatments were implemented), but at the exact point of inoculation, once again demonstrating its immunity to antifungal agents and treatment methods.

=== Non-human ===
There are parallels in both humans and animals when it comes to infections caused by C. hoffmannii. In humans, C. hoffmannii is not only the causative agent when it comes to original infection, but it also exacerbates the symptoms upon administration of antifungal treatments. In the case of a household dog suffering from claudication in the jaw, rigorous treatment with ketoconazole and itraconazole (for 3 total times per day over 3 months) had no effect, since this fungus is resistant to such treatments.

== Treatment ==
Coniochaeta hoffmannii has proven to be resistant to multiple antifungal agents, including amphotericin B, flucytosine, ketoconazole, and fluconazole. Because of this, precautions have been taken, such as antifungal susceptibility testing, in order to circumvent such drawbacks. Through this method, polyhexamethylene biguanide (PHMB) has been identified and utilized in conjunction with invasive surgical procedures to successfully treat one of the only cases of infection at the hands of this fungus. This method of treatment is employed in order to safeguard against fungal infection even in an immunocompetent host.
