= Coniochaeta tetraspora =

Scientific classification
- Kingdom: Fungi
- Division: Ascomycota
- Class: Sordariomycetes
- Order: Coniochaetales
- Family: Coniochaetaceae
- Genus: Coniochaeta
- Species: C. tetraspora

Binomial name
- Coniochaeta tetraspora Cain (1961)

Species of soil fungus

Coniochaeta tetraspora is a species of fungus in the family Coniochaetaceae. It was first isolated from forest soil in Queensland, Australia, and has since been recorded from the Galápagos Islands, Spain, and California. The species exhibits a distinctive pattern of ascospore development: eight spores initially form within each spore sac, but four consistently abort, leaving only four to mature. In culture, colonies are thin and whitish, later becoming pinkish as asexual spores accumulate, and the dark, pear-shaped fruiting bodies bear short spiny hairs. The fungus is self-fertile, meaning a single spore can give rise to a colony capable of completing its sexual cycle without a mating partner.

== Taxonomy ==
Coniochaeta tetraspora is an ascomycete fungus that was described as a new species by Roy F. Cain in 1961, based on material isolated in pure culture from forest soil collected at Binna Burra, Queensland, Australia, by Jack Warcup (type specimen TRTC 36859). In Cain's account, the species was characterised by a combination of dark, spiny hairs on the perithecia and an asexual (conidial) stage producing both phialospores and blastospores, features consistent with placement in Coniochaeta.

Cain separated C. tetraspora from superficially similar dark-spored ascomycetes (including species then placed in Sordaria) by its short, rigid, spiny perithecial hairs, the very short stipe of the ascus, and its relatively small ascospores that are laterally compressed (flattened on the sides) and bear a germinal slit running the full length of the spore. He also reported an unusual developmental pattern in the ascus: eight ascospores are delimited at a very early stage, but four soon abort, leaving four spores to mature (reflected in the four-spored asci seen at maturity).

A later cytogenetic study confirmed that the four-spored condition in Coniochaeta tetraspora results from the degeneration of four ascospores after an initially normal eight-spored stage, rather than from four spores being formed directly. The authors also found the species to be homothallic: cultures started from single uninucleate conidia or single ascospores were self-fertile and repeatedly produced asci in which four spores mature and four abort.

== Description ==
In culture (on Leonian agar with yeast extract), colonies are thin and initially white, later becoming pinkish as a slimy mass of conidia accumulates; the surface is smooth and glistening and lacks aerial hyphae. Vegetative hyphae are hyaline (colourless), septate, and about 3–4 μm in diameter. Asexual spores are produced abundantly from phialides (conidium-producing cells) that are often little more than openings in ordinary hyphal cells; the conidia are one-celled and hyaline, ellipsoid to nearly oblong, about 4–11 × 1.0–4.0 micrometres (μm), and may bud to form blastospores that are similar in appearance.

Sexual fruiting bodies (perithecia) form mainly in the centre of the colony and may be densely clustered or scattered. They are superficial, black, and pyriform (pear-shaped), with an ostiole (a small apical opening) but no distinct neck, measuring about 135–220 × 80–190 micrometres (μm). The upper portion of the perithecium bears short, straight, rigid, dark-brown spiny hairs, about 15–20 × 2.5–3.5 μm, while the peridial wall is thin and membranous. Asci are cylindrical (about 50–55 × 8–11 μm) and typically contain four spores at maturity; Cain described only a very slight (or absent) apical thickening and a very short, stout stipe. Ascospores are one-celled and become dark brown and opaque as they mature. They are laterally compressed (appearing narrower in one view and broader in another), measuring about 10–15 × 6.5–8.0 × 5.0–6.0 μm, and have a germinal slit (a groove through which the spore germinates) extending the full length of the spore along its narrower face. In culture, perithecia were not produced on all media and may cease to form after repeated transfers. Even when an ostiole is present, asci tend to rupture at the opening so spores accumulate near the apex rather than being forcibly discharged.

In the sexual cycle, asci initially delimit eight single-nucleate ascospores (after meiosis and a postmeiotic mitosis), but only two spore pairs continue to develop; the other two pairs consistently degenerate and disappear, leaving four mature spores per ascus. Raju and Perkins described this consistent loss of half the spores as "programmed ascospore death" (a term alluding to the broader phenomenon of programmed cell death), and the ordered patterns of surviving versus aborting spores within linear asci suggest control by a chromosomal factor expressed during ascus development.

== Habitat and distribution ==
Coniochaeta tetraspora was first characterised from forest soil collected in Queensland, Australia. The original isolate came from soil collected at Binna Burra and was maintained in culture, with dried type material deposited in the University of Toronto cryptogamic herbarium (TRTC). In addition to the original Queensland soil isolate, later work examined strains identified as Coniochaeta tetraspora that had been isolated from soil in the Galápagos Islands, Spain, and from postfire chaparral soils in southern California, suggesting the species can occur in diverse soil habitats beyond the type locality.
