= Chaetosphaeria elegans =

Scientific classification
- Kingdom: Fungi
- Division: Ascomycota
- Class: Sordariomycetes
- Order: Chaetosphaeriales
- Family: Chaetosphaeriaceae
- Genus: Chaetosphaeria
- Species: C. elegans

Binomial name
- Chaetosphaeria elegans Rick, 1906

Species of fungus

Chaetosphaeria elegans is a fungus species in the genus Chaetosphaeria. It was originally found on rotten wood in Rio Grande do Sul, Brazil.
