= Leptospora =

Scientific classification
- Domain: Eukaryota
- Kingdom: Fungi
- Division: Ascomycota
- Class: Dothideomycetes
- Order: Pleosporales
- Family: Phaeosphaeriaceae
- Genus: Leptospora; Rabenh.

Type species
- Leptospora porphyrogona (Tode) Rabenh.

Genus of fungi

Leptospora is a genus of fungi in the class Dothideomycetes. It was placed in the Phaeosphaeriaceae family.

The genus was circumscribed by German botanist and mycologist Gottlob Ludwig Rabenhorst in 1908, with Leptospora rubella assigned as the type species in Hedwigia vol.1 on page 116 in 1857. It had previously been Sphaeria rubella Pers., Syn. meth. fung. (Göttingen) 1: 63 (1801).

== Species ==
As accepted by Species Fungorum;

- Leptospora chromolaenae Mapook & K.D. Hyde (2020)
- Leptospora clematidis Phukhams., Ertz, Gerstmans & K.D. Hyde (2020)
- Leptospora elaeodendri S.D. Patil & C. Ramesh (1986)
- Leptospora euphrasiae Murashk. (1924)
- Leptospora galii N.I. de Silva & K.D. Hyde (2016)
- Leptospora hydei J.F. Zhang, J.K. Liu & Z.Y. Liu (2019)
- Leptospora implexa (Ellis & Everh.) J. Walker (1980)
- Leptospora indica A. Pande (1979)
- Leptospora inquinans I. Hino & Katum. (1955)
- Leptospora jubaeae Speg. (1921)
- Leptospora macarangae Tennakoon, C.H. Kuo & K.D. Hyde (2021)
- Leptospora musae Drost (1912)
- Leptospora nuda Gucevič (1955)
- Leptospora phraeana Mapook & K.D. Hyde (2020)
- Leptospora rubella (Pers.) Rabenh. (1857)
- Leptospora thailandica Phukhams. & K.D. Hyde (2016)

Former species;

- L. canescens (Pers.) G. Winter (1885) = Echinosphaeria canescens, Helminthosphaeriaceae
- L. caudata Fuckel (1870) = Hilberina caudata, Helminthosphaeriaceae
- L. felina (Fuckel) Fuckel (1870) = Lasiosphaeria felina, Lasiosphaeriaceae
- L. helminthospora Rehm (1882) = Acanthophiobolus helicosporus, Tubeufiaceae
- L. ovina (Pers.) Fuckel (1870) = Lasiosphaeria ovina, Lasiosphaeriaceae
- L. ovina var. glabrata (Fr.) Fuckel (1870) = Lasiosphaeria glabrata, Lasiosphaeriaceae
- L. phyllophila (Mouton) Kirschst. (1911) = Iodosphaeria phyllophila, Iodosphaeriaceae
- L. porphyrogona (Tode) Rabenh. (1857) = Leptospora rubella, Dothideomycetes
- L. simillima (Berk. & Ravenel) Theiss. & Syd. (1917) = Pseudomeliola grammodes, Hypocreales order
- L. sorbina (Nyl.) Munk (1952) = Lasiosphaeria sorbina, Lasiosphaeriaceae
- L. sparsa Sacc. & Fairm. (1906) = Cercophora sparsa, Neoschizotheciaceae
- L. spermoides (Hoffm.) Fuckel (1870) = Ruzenia spermoides, Helminthosphaeriaceae
- L. spermoides var. rugulosa Rick (1905) = Nitschkia rugulosa, Nitschkiaceae
- L. stictochaetophora Fairm. (1906) = Lasiosphaeria stictochaetophora, Lasiosphaeriaceae
- L. strigosa (Alb. & Schwein.) Fuckel (1870) = Echinosphaeria strigosa, Helminthosphaeriaceae
