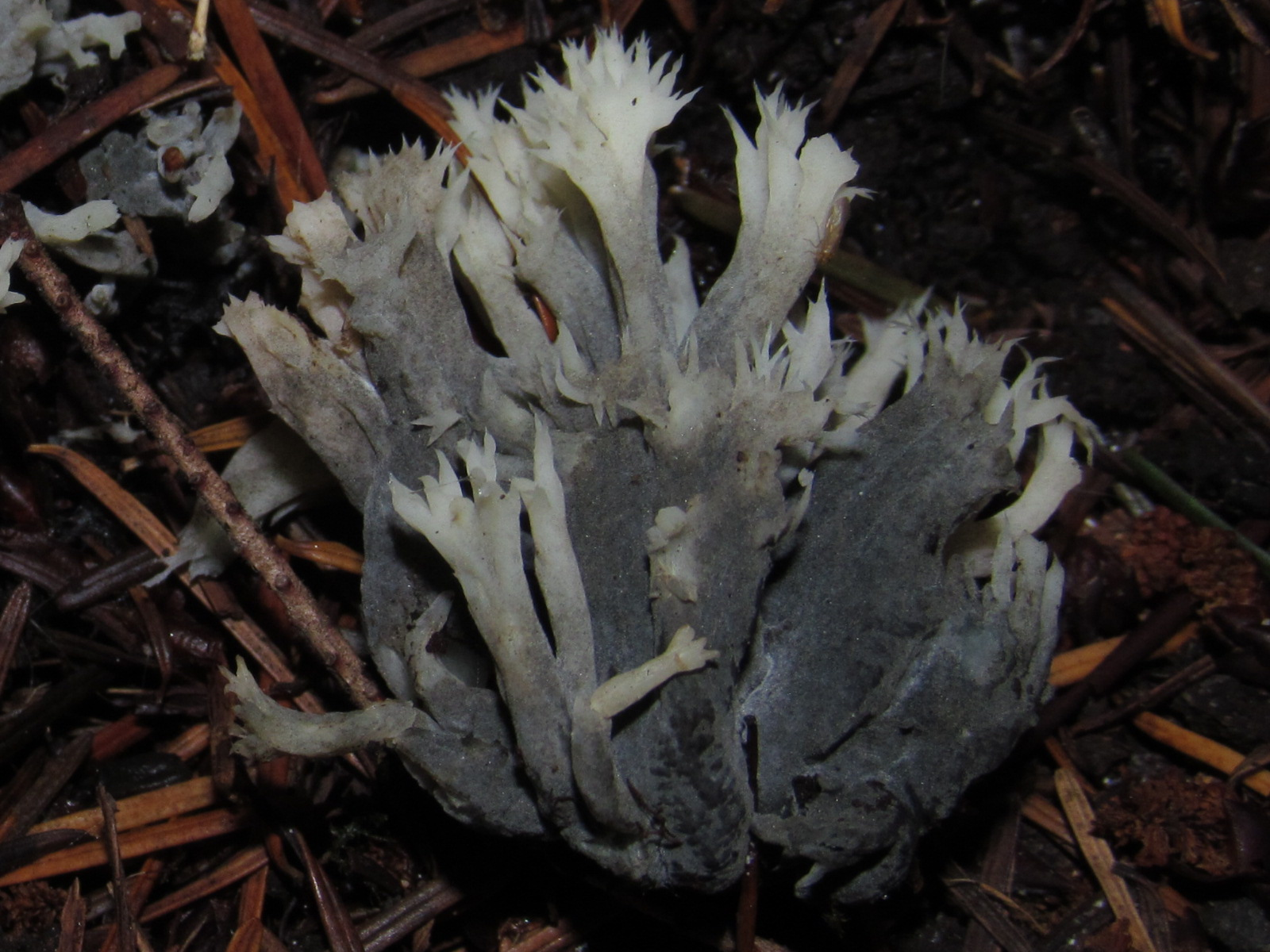
- Helminthosphaeria clavariarum infecting Clavulina cristata

Scientific classification
- Kingdom: Fungi
- Division: Ascomycota
- Class: Sordariomycetes
- Order: Chaetosphaeriales
- Family: Helminthosphaeriaceae
- Genus: Helminthosphaeria; Fuckel (1870)

Type species
- Helminthosphaeria clavariarum (Desm.) Fuckel (1870)

Synonyms
- Litschaueria Petr. (1923)

= Helminthosphaeria =

Genus of fungi

Helminthosphaeria is a genus of fungi in the family Helminthosphaeriaceae (Ascomycota).

== Species ==
- H. carpathica
- H. clavariarum
- H. corticiorum
- H. hercynica
- H. hyphodermae
- H. mammillata
- H. odontiae
- H. palustris
- H. pilifera
- H. sanguinolenta
