= Australiasca =

Scientific classification
- Kingdom: Fungi
- Division: Ascomycota
- Class: Sordariomycetes
- Order: Chaetosphaeriales
- Family: Australiascaceae
- Genus: Australiasca Sivan. & Alcorn (2002)

Type species
- Australiasca queenslandica Sivan. & Alcorn (2002)

Species
- Australiasca laeensis Australiasca queenslandica

Genus of fungus

Australiasca is a genus of fungi in the family Australiascaceae.

It was as formerly in the Chaetosphaeriaceae family.
