= Sporoschisma =

Scientific classification
- Kingdom: Fungi
- Division: Ascomycota
- Class: Sordariomycetes
- Order: Chaetosphaeriales
- Family: Chaetosphaeriaceae
- Genus: Sporoschisma; Berk. & Broome 1847

Species
- See text.

Genus of fungi

Sporoschisma is a genus of fungi within the Chaetosphaeriaceae family.

== Species ==
- Sporoschisma ampullula
- Sporoschisma connari
- Sporoschisma juniperi
- Sporoschisma juvenile
- Sporoschisma montellicum
- Sporoschisma mori
- Sporoschisma nigroseptatum
- Sporoschisma parcicuneatum
- Sporoschisma phaeocentron
- Sporoschisma stilboideum
- Sporoschisma tracyi
- Sporoschisma uniseptatum
