= Lecythothecium =

Scientific classification
- Kingdom: Fungi
- Division: Ascomycota
- Class: Sordariomycetes
- Order: Chaetosphaeriales
- Family: Chaetosphaeriaceae
- Genus: Lecythothecium; Réblová & Winka

Type species
- Lecythothecium duriligni Réblová & Winka

Genus of fungi

Lecythothecium is a genus of fungi within the Chaetosphaeriaceae family. This is a monotypic genus, containing the single species Lecythothecium duriligni.
