= Miyoshiella =

Scientific classification
- Kingdom: Fungi
- Division: Ascomycota
- Class: Sordariomycetes
- Order: Chaetosphaeriales
- Family: Chaetosphaeriaceae
- Genus: Miyoshiella; Kawam., J. Jap. Bot. 4: 295 (1929)

Type species
- Miyoshiella fusispora Kawam. 1929

Genus of fungi

Miyoshiella is a genus of fungi in the family Chaetosphaeriaceae.

== Species ==
As accepted by Species Fungorum;

- Miyoshiella fusispora Kawam. (1929)
- Miyoshiella triseptata (Shoemaker & G.P. White) Réblová (1999)

Former species;

- Miyoshiella larvata Réblová (1999) = Stanjehughesia larvata, Pleosporomycetidae
- Miyoshiella macrospora Kawam. (1929) = Chaetosphaeria macrospora, Chaetosphaeriaceae
