= Ascochalara =

Scientific classification
- Kingdom: Fungi
- Division: Ascomycota
- Class: Sordariomycetes
- Order: Chaetosphaeriales
- Family: Chaetosphaeriaceae
- Genus: Ascochalara; Réblová

Type species
- Ascochalara gabretae Réblová

Genus of fungi

Ascochalara is a genus of fungi within the Chaetosphaeriaceae family. This is a monotypic genus, containing the single species Ascochalara gabretae.
