= Porosphaerella =

Scientific classification
- Kingdom: Fungi
- Division: Ascomycota
- Class: Sordariomycetes
- Order: Cordanales
- Family: Cordanaceae
- Genus: Porosphaerella E.Müll. & Samuels (1982)

Type species
- Porosphaerella cordanophora E.Müll. & Samuels (1982)

Species
- P. borinquensis P. cordanophora P. setosa

Synonyms
- Cordana Preuss (1851); Preussiaster Kuntze (1891)

Genus of fungi

Porosphaerella is a genus consisting of (possibly only one) or three species of fungi in the family Cordanaceae.

Was formerly in the Chaetosphaeriaceae family.
