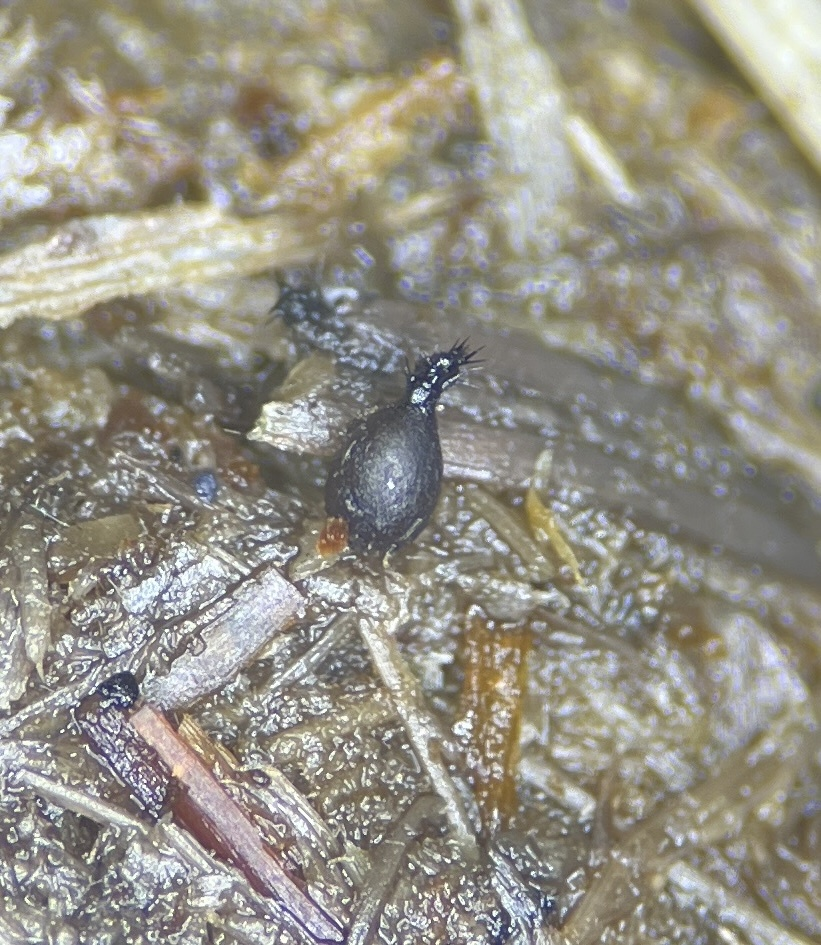
- Coniochaeta burtii

Scientific classification
- Kingdom: Fungi
- Division: Ascomycota
- Class: Sordariomycetes
- Order: Coniochaetales
- Family: Coniochaetaceae
- Genus: Coniochaeta

Species
- See text

= Coniochaeta =

Genus of fungi

The Coniochaeta are a genus of pleomorphic yeasts of the order Coniochaetales and are pathogens of trees. Some species have also been found to form endophytic associations within plants in which they live inside plant tissues but do not actually harm the organism. They can take the form of pink to brown colonies, hyphae, conidiophores or sclerotia. In 2013, the Lecythophora were merged with the Coniochaeta, following suggestions by Ziauddin Khan et al.

== Ecology ==
The Coniochaeta have been described as typically associated with wood, water, and soil. However, there is also growing evidence of specialised associations between each species and specific environments, and a suggestion that 4-spored and 8-spored species interact differently with their environments, some species surviving forest fires, which activate their sexual cycle.

== Medical Issues ==
Other members of the Coniochaeta, most commonly Coniochaeta polymorpha, can cause clinical infections in immunocompromised individuals, which has increased recent interest in the genus.

== Species ==
As accepted by Species Fungorum;

- Coniochaeta acaciae Samarak., Gafforov & K.D. Hyde (2018)
- Coniochaeta africana Damm & Crous (2010)
- Coniochaeta albidomucosa Petr. (1952)
- Coniochaeta alkalivirens Checa & G. Moreno (1988)
- Coniochaeta angustispora D. Hawksw. & H.Y. Yip (1981)
- Coniochaeta arctispora (Cooke & Ellis) M.E. Barr (1993)
- Coniochaeta arenariae Dayar. & E.B.G. Jones (2020)
- Coniochaeta areolatirubra Checa, Barrasa & G. Moreno (1988)
- Coniochaeta arxii Udagawa & Takada (1989)
- Coniochaeta baysunika Wanas., Gafforov, E.B.G. Jones & K.D. Hyde (2018)
- Coniochaeta boothii (Manohar. & P.Rama Rao) Dania García, Stchigel & Guarro (2006)
- Coniochaeta burtii M.J. Richardson (2006)
- Coniochaeta caffra Matsush. (1996)
- Coniochaeta calligoni (Kravtzev) Vasyag. (1981)
- Coniochaeta caryotae R. Rao (1971)
- Coniochaeta cateniformis (Perdomo, Dania García, Gené, Cano & Guarro) Gené & Guarro (2013)
- Coniochaeta cephalothecoides Kamiya, Uchiy. & Udagawa (1995)
- Coniochaeta cipronana Coronado-Ruiz, Avendaño, Escudero-Leyva, Conejo-Barboza, P. Chaverri & Chavarría (2018)
- Coniochaeta coluteae Samarak., Gafforov & K.D. Hyde (2018)
- Coniochaeta cruciata Fort & Guarro (1988)
- Coniochaeta cymbiformispora T. Yokoy. & Tad. Ito (1989)
- Coniochaeta cypraeispora Van der Linde (1991)
- Coniochaeta dakotensis Forin, Fainelli & Vizzini (2021)
- Coniochaeta deborreae Hern.-Restr. (2021)
- Coniochaeta decumbens (J.F.H. Beyma) Z.U. Khan, Gené & Guarro (2013)
- Coniochaeta dendrobiicola Sujit Shah (2019)
- Coniochaeta detonsa Cooke (1887)
- Coniochaeta discoidea (Udagawa & Furuya) Dania García, Stchigel & Guarro (2006)
- Coniochaeta discospora (Auersw.) Cain (1934)
- Coniochaeta dumosa Kamiya, Uchiy. & Udagawa (1995)
- Coniochaeta elegans A.E. Arnold, A.H. Harr., Y.K. Huang, J.M. U'Ren, Massimo, Knight-Connoni & Inderb. (2021)
- Coniochaeta ellipsoidea Udagawa (1967)
- Coniochaeta emodensis Udagawa & Y. Horie (1982)
- Coniochaeta endophytica A.H. Harrington & A.E. Arnold (2019)
- Coniochaeta euphorbiae S. Nasr, S. Bien & Damm (2018)
- Coniochaeta extramundana Mahoney & La Favre (1981)
- Coniochaeta fasciculata (J.F.H. Beyma) Z.U. Khan, Gené & Guarro (2013)
- Coniochaeta fibrosae H.L. Si & Y.M. Su (2021)
- Coniochaeta fodinicola Vázq.-Camp. (2014)
- Coniochaeta geophila (E. Bommer, M. Rousseau & Sacc.) Forin, Fainelli & Vizzini (2021)
- Coniochaeta gigantospora J. Fourn., Raja & A.N. Mill. (2012)
- Coniochaeta gymnosporiae S.B. Kale & S.V.S. Kale (1973)
- Coniochaeta haloxyli (Kravtzev) Z.Q. Yuan & Z.Y. Zhao (1993)
- Coniochaeta hansenii (Oudem.) Cain (1934)
- Coniochaeta hericium Schwein. ex Cooke (1887)
- Coniochaeta hoffmannii (J.F.H. Beyma) Z.U. Khan, Gené & Guarro (2013)
- Coniochaeta iranica S. Nasr, S. Bien & Damm (2018)
- Coniochaeta krabiensis Dayar. & E.B.G. Jones (2020)
- Coniochaeta leucoplaca (Sacc.) Cain (1934)
- Coniochaeta ligniaria (Grev.) Cooke (1887)
- Coniochaeta lignicola (Nannf.) Z.U. Khan, Gené & Guarro (2013)
- Coniochaeta lutea A.E. Arnold & A.H. Harr. (2021)
- Coniochaeta luteorubra (Perdomo, Dania García, Gené, Cano & Guarro) Gené & Guarro (2013)
- Coniochaeta luteoviridis (J.F.H. Beyma) Z.U. Khan, Gené & Guarro (2013)
- Coniochaeta magniquadrispora Matsush. (1996)
- Coniochaeta malacotricha (Auersw. ex Niessl) Traverso (1907)
- Coniochaeta marina Dayar., S. Tibell, Tibell & K.D. Hyde (2019)
- Coniochaeta microspora S.M. Reddy & Bilgrami (1969)
- Coniochaeta mirabilis (Udagawa & Tsub.) Dania García, Stchigel & Guarro (2006)
- Coniochaeta mongoliae H.L. Si & Y.M. Su (2021)
- Coniochaeta montana A.E. Arnold, A.H. Harr., Y.K. Huang, J.M. U'Ren, Massimo, Knight-Connoni & Inderb. (2021)
- Coniochaeta multispora Cain (1934)
- Coniochaeta mutabilis (J.F.H. Beyma) Z.U. Khan, Gené & Guarro (2013)
- Coniochaeta myricariae (Fuckel) Arx & E. Müll. (1954)
- Coniochaeta navarrae Friebes, Jaklitsch, S. García & Voglmayr (2016)
- Coniochaeta nepalica Minoura, Morinaga & T. Muroi (1977)
- Coniochaeta niesslii (Auersw.) Cooke (1887)
- Coniochaeta nigerrima Peyronel (1918)
- Coniochaeta nivea A.E. Arnold, A.H. Harr., Y.K. Huang, J.M. U'Ren, Massimo, Knight-Connoni & Inderb. (2021)
- Coniochaeta nuciformis (Guarro, Gené, Al-Bader & Abdullah) Dania García, Stchigel & Guarro (2006)
- Coniochaeta ornata Dania García, Stchigel & Guarro (2006)
- Coniochaeta ostrea (Malloch & Cain) Dania García, Stchigel & Guarro (2006)
- Coniochaeta ovata Matsush. (1971)
- Coniochaeta palaoa A.E. Arnold, A.H. Harr., Inderb. & Knight-Connoni (2021)
- Coniochaeta parasitica G.C. Zhao & R.L. Zhao (2012)
- Coniochaeta perangusta Udagawa & Y. Sugiy. (1982)
- Coniochaeta phalacrocarpa G.C. Carroll & Munk (1964)
- Coniochaeta philocoproides (Griffiths) Cain (1934)
- Coniochaeta pilifera (A. Bayer) N. Lundq. (1992)
- Coniochaeta polymegasperma M.J. Richardson (1998)
- Coniochaeta polymorpha Z.U. Khan, Guarro & Suh. Ahmad (2013)
- Coniochaeta polysperma Furuya & Udagawa (1976)
- Coniochaeta proteae Marinc., M.J. Wingf. & Crous (2008)
- Coniochaeta prunicola Damm & Crous (2010)
- Coniochaeta pulveracea (Ehrh. ex Pers.) Munk (1948)
- Coniochaeta punctulata (Udagawa & Furuya) Dania García, Stchigel & Guarro (2006)
- Coniochaeta renispora J.L. Crane & Shearer (1995)
- Coniochaeta rhopalochaeta A.I. Romero & Carmarán (1999)
- Coniochaeta rosae Wanas., Gafforov, E.B.G. Jones & K.D. Hyde (2018)
- Coniochaeta saccardoi (Marchal) Cain (1934)
- Coniochaeta salicifolia A.B. Sharma & Dearnaley (2021)
- Coniochaeta sarothamni (J. Schröt.) Arx & E. Müll. (1954)
- Coniochaeta savoryi (C. Booth) Dania García, Stchigel & Guarro (2006)
- Coniochaeta scatigena (Berk. & Broome) Cain (1934)
- Coniochaeta simbalensis S. Rana & S.K. Singh (2019)
- Coniochaeta sinensis H.L. Si & Y.M. Su (2021)
- Coniochaeta sordaria (Fr.) Petr. (1953)
- Coniochaeta sphaeroidea Lar.N. Vassiljeva (1998)
- Coniochaeta subcorticalis (Fuckel) Cooke (1887)
- Coniochaeta taeniospora (Sacc.) Friebes, Jaklitsch & Voglmayr (2016)
- Coniochaeta tetraspora Cain (1961)
- Coniochaeta tilakii S.B. Kale (1968)
- Coniochaeta trivialis N. Lundq. (1981)
- Coniochaeta vagans (De Not.) N. Lundq. (1981)
- Coniochaeta velutina (Fuckel) Cooke (1887)
- Coniochaeta velutinosa Asgari & Zare (2006)
- Coniochaeta verticillata (Emden) Dania García, Stchigel & Guarro (2006)
- Coniochaeta vineae S.K. Huang, T.C. Wen & K.D. Hyde (2020)
- Coniochaeta williamsii Hansf. (1954)
- Coniochaeta xinjiangensis J.H. Kong & T.Y. Zhang (2017)
- Coniochaeta xylariispora (Cooke & Ellis) Cooke (1887)

Former species;

- C. brassicae (P. Crouan & H. Crouan) Cooke (1887) = Cladorrhinum olerum, Podosporaceae family
- C. calva (Tode) Popuschoj (1971) = Lasiosphaeria calva, Lasiosphaeriaceae
- C. canina (Deanna A. Sutton, Gené & Cano) Deanna A. Sutton, Gené & Cano (2013) = Lecythophora canina, Coniochaetaceae
- C. capillifera (Curr.) Cooke (1888) = Hypocopra capillifera, Xylariaceae
- C. elaeidicola (Henn.) C. Moreau & M. Moreau (1949) = Stilbohypoxylon elaeidicola, Xylariaceae
- C. ershadii Zare, Asgari & W. Gams (2007) = Coniolariella ershadii, Xylariaceae
- C. hypoxylina (Ces.) Lar.N. Vassiljeva (1998) = Stilbohypoxylon hypoxylinum, Xylariaceae
- C. gamsii Asgari & Zare (2006) = Coniolariella limonispora, Xylariaceae
- C. nodulisporioides D. Hawksw. (1978) = Coniocessia nodulisporioides, Coniocessiaceae
- C. obliquata (Sommerf.) Minter (2007) = Rosellinia obliquata, Xylariaceae
- C. pilosella (P. Karst.) Cooke (1887) = Capronia pilosella, Herpotrichiellaceae
- C. polyspora (W. Phillips & Plowr.) N. Lundq. (1992) = Sordaria polyspora, Sordariaceae
- C. queenslandiae Henn. (1903) = Rosellinia queenslandiae, Xylariaceae
- C. sanguinolenta (Wallr.) Checa, Barrasa & G. Moreno (1988) = Helminthosphaeria sanguinolenta, Helminthosphaeriaceae
