= Tainosphaeria =

Scientific classification
- Kingdom: Fungi
- Division: Ascomycota
- Class: Sordariomycetes
- Order: Chaetosphaeriales
- Family: Chaetosphaeriaceae
- Genus: Tainosphaeria; F.A. Fernández & Huhndorf

Type species
- Tainosphaeria crassiparies F.A. Fernández & Huhndorf

Genus of fungi

Tainosphaeria is a genus of fungi within the Chaetosphaeriaceae family. This is a monotypic genus, containing the single species Tainosphaeria crassiparies.
