= Thozetella =

Scientific classification
- Kingdom: Fungi
- Division: Ascomycota
- Class: Sordariomycetes
- Order: Chaetosphaeriales
- Family: Chaetosphaeriaceae
- Genus: Thozetella; Kuntze, Revis. gen. pl. (Leipzig) 2: 873 (1891)

Type species
- Thozetella nivea (Berk.) Kuntze (1891)

Synonyms
- Thozetia Berk. & F. Muell., in Berkeley 1881

Genus of fungi

Thozetella is a genus of fungi in the family Chaetosphaeriaceae. This has been confirmed with analyse of 3 genes (ribosomal DNA and protein coding genes: RNA polymerase II largest subunit (RBP2) and b-tubulin) and morphological comparison.

Type species, Thozetella nivea is saprobic on submerged decaying wood in freshwater in Thailand.

Species Thozetella pinicola was found on leaf litter of Pinus elliottii Engelm. in Hong Kong. Species Thozetella pandanicola Tibpromma & K.D. Hyde (2018) is found on members of the Pandanaceae family with other micro-fungi species in China and Thailand. Species Thozetella aculeata was found on leaf litter in Brazil.

The genus was circumscribed by Carl Ernst Otto Kuntze in Revis. gen. pl. (Leipzig) vol.2 on page 873 in 1891.

The genus name of Thozetella is in honour of Anthelme Thozet (1826–1878), who was a French-Australian botanist and ethnographer.

== Species ==
As accepted by Species Fungorum;

- Thozetella acerosa B.C. Paulus, Gadek & K.D. Hyde (2004)
- Thozetella aculeata Prisc. Silva & Grandi (2011)
- Thozetella bambusicola H.B. Jiang, Phookamsak & K.D. Hyde (2020)
- Thozetella boonjiensis B.C. Paulus, Gadek & K.D. Hyde (2004)
- Thozetella buxifolia Allegr., Cazau, Cabello & Aramb. (2004)
- Thozetella canadensis Nag Raj (1976)
- Thozetella capitata P. da Silva & Grandi (2013)
- Thozetella coronata J.S. Monteiro, R.F. Castañeda & Gusmão (2016)
- Thozetella cristata Piroz. & Hodges (1973)
- Thozetella cubensis R.F. Castañeda & G.R.W. Arnold (1985)
- Thozetella effusa B. Sutton & G.T. Cole (1983)
- Thozetella fabacearum R.H. Perera & K.D. Hyde (2016)
- Thozetella falcata B.C. Paulus, Gadek & K.D. Hyde (2004)
- Thozetella gigantea B.C. Paulus, Gadek & K.D. Hyde (2004)
- Thozetella havanensis R.F. Castañeda (1984)
- Thozetella lithocarpi R.H. Perera & K.D. Hyde (2019)
- Thozetella neonivea Crous & Thangavel (2019)
- Thozetella nivea (Berk.) Kuntze (1891)
- Thozetella pandanicola Tibpromma & K.D. Hyde (2018)
- Thozetella pindobacuensis T.A.B. Santos, L.B. Conç. & Gusmão (2018)
- Thozetella pinicola S.Y. Yeung, Jeewon & K.D. Hyde (2009)
- Thozetella queenslandica B.C. Paulus, Gadek & K.D. Hyde (2004)
- Thozetella radicata (E.F. Morris) Piroz. & Hodges (1973)
- Thozetella serrata Whitton, K.D. Hyde & McKenzie (2012)
- Thozetella submersa F.R. Barbosa & Gusmão (2011)
- Thozetella tocklaiensis (Agnihothr.) Piroz. & Hodges (1973)
- Thozetella ypsiloidea J.S. Monteiro, R.F. Castañeda & Gusmão (2016)
