= Echinosphaeria =

Scientific classification
- Kingdom: Fungi
- Division: Ascomycota
- Class: Sordariomycetes
- Order: Chaetosphaeriales
- Family: Helminthosphaeriaceae
- Genus: Echinosphaeria; A.N.Mill. & Huhndorf (2004)

Type species
- Echinosphaeria canescens (Pers.) A.N.Mill. & Huhndorf (2004)

Species
- E. canescens E. cincinnata E. macrospora E. medusa E. pteridis

Genus of fungi

Echinosphaeria is a genus of fungi in the family Helminthosphaeriaceae.
