= Melanochaeta =

Melanochaeta may refer to:

- Melanochaeta (fly), a genus of fly in the family Chloropidae
- Melanochaeta (fungus), a genus of fungi in the family Chaetosphaeriaceae
