= Barrina =

Scientific classification
- Kingdom: Fungi
- Division: Ascomycota
- Class: Sordariomycetes
- Order: Coniochaetales
- Family: Coniochaetaceae
- Genus: Barrina; A.W.Ramaley (1997)

Type species
- Barrina polyspora A.W.Ramaley (1997)

Genus of fungi

Barrina is a genus of fungi within the class Sordariomycetes. This genus was named after mycologist Margaret E. Barr. A monotypic genus, Barrina contains the single species Barrina polyspora, described as new to science in 1997.
