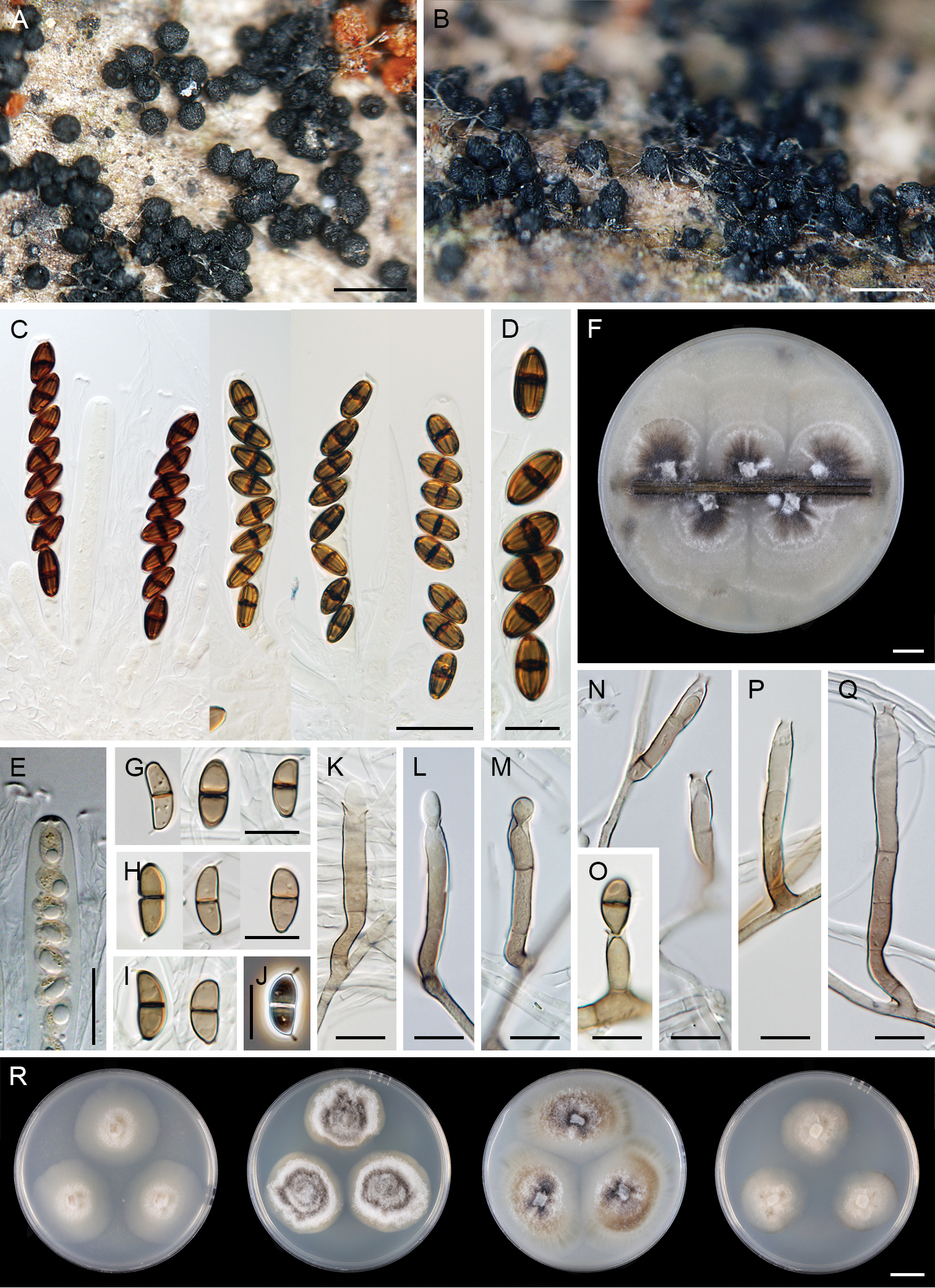
- Striatosphaeria castanea

Scientific classification
- Kingdom: Fungi
- Division: Ascomycota
- Class: Sordariomycetes
- Order: Chaetosphaeriales
- Family: Chaetosphaeriaceae
- Genus: Striatosphaeria; Samuels & E. Müll.

Type species
- Striatosphaeria codinaeaphora Samuels & E. Müll.

= Striatosphaeria =

Genus of fungi

Striatosphaeria is a genus of fungi within the Chaetosphaeriaceae family. This genus was defined in 1979 for the single Puerto Rican species Striatosphaeria codinaeaphora, and then in 2020 the Brazilian species S. castanea (found on bark of liana) was added.
