= Zignoella =

Scientific classification
- Kingdom: Fungi
- Division: Ascomycota
- Class: Sordariomycetes
- Order: Chaetosphaeriales
- Family: Chaetosphaeriaceae
- Genus: Zignoëlla; Sacc. 1878

Species
- See text.

Genus of fungi

Zignoëlla is a genus of fungi within the Chaetosphaeriaceae family.

The genus was circumscribed by Pier Andrea Saccardo in Michelia vol.1 on page 346 in 1878.

The genus name of Zignoëlla is in honour of Achille de Zigno (1813–1892), who was an Italian geologist and Paleo-botanist. He was economically independent. He worked in Padua, he became interested in botany (cryptogams and Algae), before looking at geology and palaeontology in Vienna.

== Species ==
Species with authors are accepted by Species Fungorum;

- Zignoëlla abscondita (Ellis & Everh.) Fairm. (1921)
- Zignoëlla acervata
- Zignoëlla adjuncta
- Zignoëlla albocincta
- Zignoëlla algaphila F. Stevens (1920)
- Zignoëlla anceps Sacc. (1908)
- Zignoëlla annonicola Speg. (1909)
- Zignoëlla antarctica
- Zignoëlla arengae Rehm (1913)
- Zignoëlla arthopyrenioides
- Zignoëlla astrocaryi
- Zignoëlla australica
- Zignoëlla australis
- Zignoëlla bizzozeriana
- Zignoëlla boreella
- Zignoëlla buettneri
- Zignoëlla caesalpiniae Zimm. (1902)
- Zignoëlla campi-silii
- Zignoëlla cariosa
- Zignoëlla casaresiana (Gonz. Frag.) Racov. (1959)
- Zignoëlla cascarillae Rehm (1903)
- Zignoëlla claypolensis Speg. (1909)
- Zignoëlla collabens (Curr.) Sacc. (1883)
- Zignoëlla conica
- Zignoëlla cryptarum
- Zignoëlla culmicola
- Zignoëlla dealbata (Cooke) Sacc. (1887)
- Zignoëlla dolichospora Sacc. (1878)
- Zignoëlla duvauicola Speg. (1912)
- Zignoëlla ebuli
- Zignoëlla erumpens
- Zignoëlla eumorpha
- Zignoëlla eutypoides Sacc. (1881)
- Zignoëlla exigua
- Zignoëlla faginea Feltgen (1903)
- Zignoëlla fallaciosa
- Zignoëlla fallax (Sacc.) Sacc. (1883)
- Zignoëlla fraxinicola
- Zignoëlla fuegiana
- Zignoëlla garciniae Henn. (1904)
- Zignoëlla hanburiana
- Zignoëlla haynaldii
- Zignoëlla hederae
- Zignoëlla herbana
- Zignoëlla hysterioides (Curr. ex Cooke) Sacc. (1891)
- Zignoëlla ignobilis
- Zignoëlla ijuhensis
- Zignoëlla immersa
- Zignoëlla improvisa
- Zignoëlla incerta
- Zignoëlla inflata
- Zignoëlla insueta Chenant. (1919)
- Zignoëlla intermedia
- Zignoëlla interspersa
- Zignoëlla iranica Petr. (1949)
- Zignoëlla jurana
- Zignoëlla latericolla
- Zignoëlla lentzkeana Kirschst. (1911)
- Zignoëlla leptosperma
- Zignoëlla lichenoidea Höhn. (1909)
- Zignoëlla ligustrina
- Zignoëlla longispora
- Zignoëlla lonicerina
- Zignoëlla lortoniana Sacc. (1912)
- Zignoëlla macrasca Sacc. (1880)
- Zignoëlla macrospora (Sacc.) Sacc. (1878)
- Zignoëlla magnoliae Tracy & Earle (1896)
- Zignoëlla maingayi
- Zignoëlla matthiolae
- Zignoëlla megalospora
- Zignoëlla milleri (Chardón) Petr. (1951)
- Zignoëlla minutissima
- Zignoëlla morthieri (Fuckel) Sacc. (1878)
- Zignoëlla naumovii Gucevič (1959)
- Zignoëlla nematasca
- Zignoëlla nitidula
- Zignoëlla nobilis Rehm (1916)
- Zignoëlla nucivora Fairm. (1921)
- Zignoëlla omphalostoma
- Zignoëlla ossaea Maire (1930)
- Zignoëlla ostiolata Dearn. & Barthol. (1926)
- Zignoëlla oudemansii
- Zignoëlla pachyspora Sacc., E. Bommer & M. Rousseau (1886)
- Zignoëlla paecilostoma (Berk. & Broome) Sacc. (1883)
- Zignoëlla palmicola Henn. (1905)
- Zignoëlla papillata
- Zignoëlla patagonica
- Zignoëlla physocarpi Naumov & Vischn. (1955)
- Zignoëlla piceae Henn. (1904)
- Zignoëlla pluriseptata Gucevič (1970)
- Zignoëlla populicola
- Zignoëlla populina
- Zignoëlla potentillae Tracy & Earle (1901)
- Zignoëlla punctiformis
- Zignoëlla querceti
- Zignoëlla ramenticola
- Zignoëlla rhodobapha (Berk. & Broome) Sacc. (1878)
- Zignoëlla rhodostacheos Speg. (1921)
- Zignoëlla rhois Gucevič (1952)
- Zignoëlla rhytidodes (Berk. & Broome) Sacc. (1878)
- Zignoëlla rorippae Rehm (1915)
- Zignoëlla rubi Noelli (1917)
- Zignoëlla rugosa
- Zignoëlla sabalina Ellis & Everh. (1902)
- Zignoëlla salicicola
- Zignoëlla scalaris
- Zignoëlla segregata
- Zignoëlla senegalensis
- Zignoëlla sequanica
- Zignoëlla seriata Sacc. (1883)
- Zignoëlla sexnucleata
- Zignoëlla sharifi Petr. (1950)
- Zignoëlla sideritidis Gucevič (1959)
- Zignoëlla sinapisperma (Rabenh.) Sacc. & Traverso (1911)
- Zignoëlla sociabilis
- Zignoëlla soluta
- Zignoëlla somala Bacc. (1916)
- Zignoëlla sphaeroides (Schaer.) Rehm (1903)
- Zignoëlla subantarctica Speg. (1923)
- Zignoëlla subferruginea
- Zignoëlla subtilissima Rehm (1911)
- Zignoëlla subvestita
- Zignoëlla superficialis Feltgen (1905)
- Zignoëlla texticola Vouaux (1909)
- Zignoëlla tingens
- Zignoëlla torpedo Theiss. (1912)
- Zignoëlla translucens
- Zignoëlla truncata Rehm (1901)
- Zignoëlla tuberculata Petch (1926)
- Zignoëlla ulmi
- Zignoëlla verrucarioides
- Zignoëlla vincentii
- Zignoëlla yerbae Speg. (1908)

Former species;

- Z. abietis Höhn. (1909) = Chaetosphaeria abietis, Chaetosphaeriaceae family
- Z. archeri (Berk.) Sacc. (1883) = Nitschkia archeri, Nitschkiaceae
- Z. aterrima (Fuckel) Sacc. (1879) = Kastanostachys aterrima, Stachybotryaceae
- Z. atriella (Cooke & Ellis) Sacc. (1878) = Chaetosphaeria atriella, Chaetosphaeriaceae
- Z. britzelmayrii (Sacc.) Sacc. (1886) = Trematosphaeria paradoxa, Trematosphaeriaceae
- Z. calospora Pat. (1897) = Pontogeneia calospora, Sordariomycetes
- Z. collabens var. curreyi (A. Bloxam ex Curr.) Sacc. (1883) = Zignoella collabens, Chaetosphaeriaceae
- Z. corticola (Fuckel) Sacc. (1878) = Lophiostoma corticola, Lophiostomataceae
- Z. crustacea Sacc. (1883) = Chaetosphaeria crustacea, Chaetosphaeriaceae
- Z. cubensis Har. & Pat. (1904) = Pontogeneia cubensis, Sordariomycetes
- Z. diaphana (Cooke & Ellis) Sacc. (1883) = Exarmidium diaphanum, Hyponectriaceae
- Z. diaphana var. soluta (Cooke & Ellis) Ellis & Everh. (1892) = Zignoella morthieri, Chaetosphaeriaceae
- Z. dubia (Sacc.) Sacc. (1878) = Ceratostomella dubia, Boliniaceae
- Z. emergens Sacc. (1878) = Keissleriella emergens, Lentitheciaceae
- Z. enormis Pat. & Har. (1903) = Pontogeneia enormis, Sordariomycetes
- Z. erumpens Cooke (1891) = Didymella erumpens, Didymellaceae
- Z. excellens Rehm ex Sacc. (1878) = Exarmidium excellens, Hyponectriaceae
- Z. fusispora (H. Wegelin) Sacc. (1895) = Trematosphaeria fusispora, Trematosphaeriaceae
- Z. gallica Sacc. & Flageolet (1916) = Chaetosphaeria gallica, Chaetosphaeriaceae
- Z. groenendalensis Sacc., E. Bommer & M. Rousseau (1884) = Brachysporium nigrum, Trichosphaeriaceae
- Z. insculpta (Fr.) Sacc. (1883) = Vialaea insculpta, Vialaeaceae
- Z. lichenoides Rehm ex Sacc. (1878) = Mycoglaena lichenoides, Dothideomycetes
- Z. lumbricoides Sacc. & Cavara (1900) = Wallrothiella lumbricoides, Amplistromataceae
- Z. magnoliae var. brasiliensis Rehm (1901) = Zignoella magnoliae, Chaetosphaeriaceae
- Z. mori (Fabre) Sacc. (1883) = Massarina mori, Massarinaceae
- Z. muelleri (Duby) Sacc. & Traverso (1911) = Leptosillia muelleri, Leptosilliaceae
- Z. nyssigena Ellis & Everh. (1893) = Anisomeridium polypori, Monoblastiaceae
- Z. obliqua Romell (1889) = Wallrothiella obliqua, Amplistromataceae
- Z. ordinata (Fr.) Sacc. (1883) = Ceratosphaeria ordinata, Ceratosphaeriaceae
- Z. ostioloidea (Cooke) Sacc. (1883) = Chaetosphaeria myriocarpa, Chaetosphaeriaceae
- Z. ovoidea (Fr.) Sacc. (1878) = Menispora glauca, Chaetosphaeriaceae
- Z. pallida (Ellis) Ellis & Everh. (1892) = Lophiotrema pallidum, Lophiostomataceae
- Z. paraguayensis Speg. (1885) = Winterina paraguayensis, Nitschkiaceae
- Z. platani (Rehm) Sacc. (1928) = Wallrothiella platani, Amplistromataceae
- Z. populi Ellis & Everh. (1898) = Trichometasphaeria populi, Lophiostomataceae
- Z. prorumpens (Rehm) Sacc. (1883) = Melomastia prorumpens, Sordariomycetes
- Z. pulviscula (Curr.) Sacc. (1878) = Menispora caesia, Chaetosphaeriaceae
- Z. pygmaea (P. Karst.) Sacc. (1878) = Chaetosphaeria pygmaea, Chaetosphaeriaceae
- Z. sardoa Sacc. & Traverso (1903) = Wallrothiella sardoa, Amplistromataceae
- Z. sequoiae (Plowr.) Sacc. (1883) = Haematomyxa sequoiae, Ascomycota order
- Z. slaptonensis P.F. Cannon (1997) = Leptosillia slaptonensis, Leptosilliaceae
- Z. somala var. calancalli Bacc. (1916) = Zignoella somala, Chaetosphaeriaceae
- Z. spissiana Lambotte & Fautrey (1897) = Wallrothiella spissiana, Amplistromataceae
- Z. subcorticale (Cooke) Sacc. (1886) = Wallrothiella subcorticalis, Amplistromataceae
- Z. transylvanica Rehm (1882) = Saccardoella transylvanica, Sordariomycetes
- Z. valoniopsidis Cribb & J.W. Cribb (1960) = Pontogeneia valoniopsidis, Sordariomycetes
- Z. vitis (Schulzer) Sacc. (1883) = Cucurbitaria vitis, Cucurbitariaceae
- Z. ybbsitzensis Strasser (1911) = Trematosphaeria ybbsitzensis, Trematosphaeriaceae
