= Melanochaeta (fungus) =

Scientific classification
- Kingdom: Fungi
- Division: Ascomycota
- Class: Sordariomycetes
- Order: Chaetosphaeriales
- Family: Chaetosphaeriaceae
- Genus: Melanochaeta; E.Müll., Harr & Sulmont (1969)

Type species
- Melanochaeta hemipsila (Berk. & Broome) E.Müll., Harr & Sulmont (1969)

Species
- M. aotearoae M. daemonoropis M. garethjonesii M. hemipsila M. taitensis

Genus of fungi

Melanochaeta is a genus of fungi in the family Chaetosphaeriaceae.
