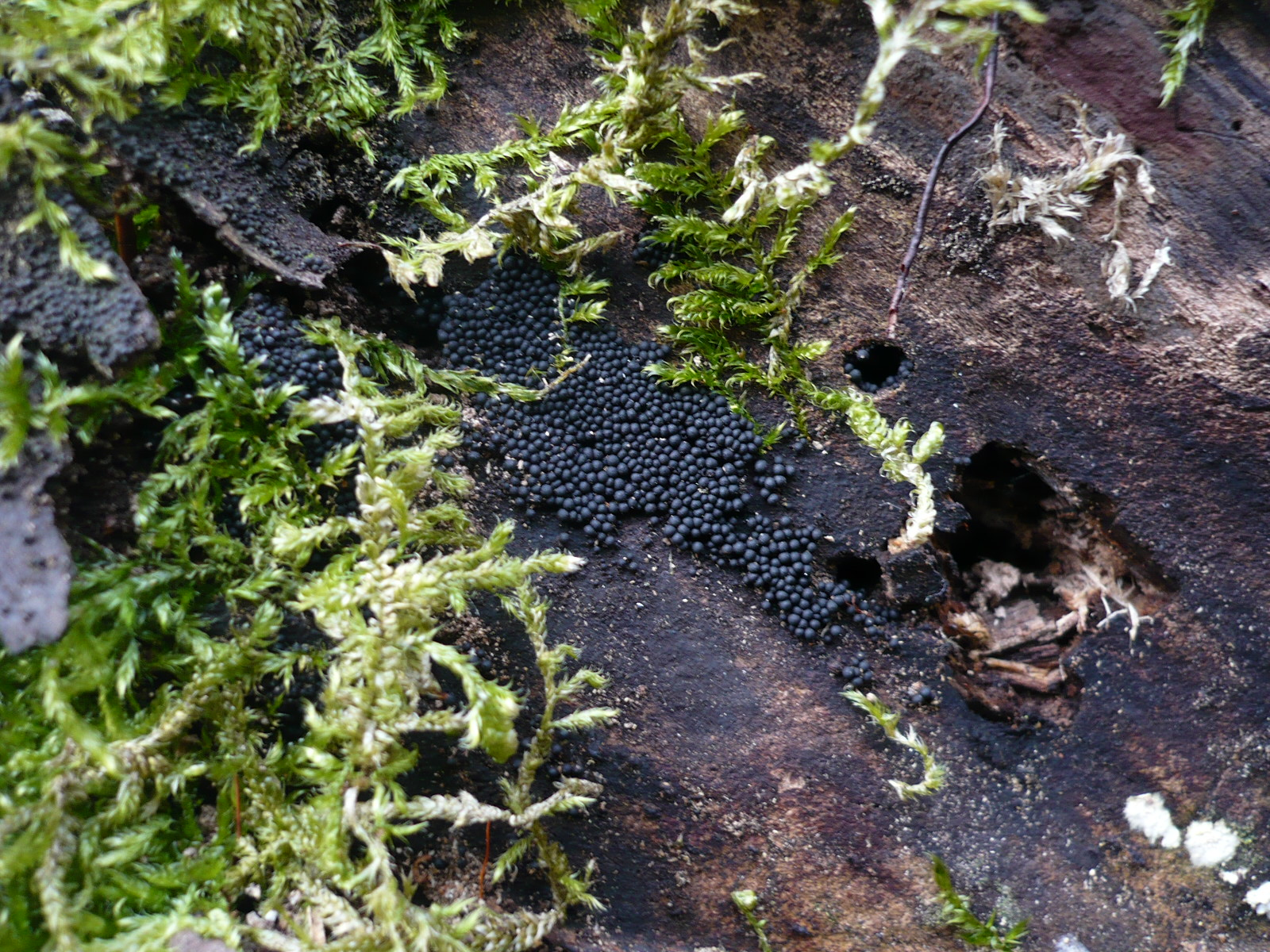

Scientific classification
- Kingdom: Fungi
- Division: Ascomycota
- Class: Sordariomycetes
- Order: Chaetosphaeriales
- Family: Helminthosphaeriaceae
- Genus: Ruzenia; O.Hilber (2002)

Type species
- Ruzenia spermoides (Hoffm.) O.Hilber ex A.N.Mill. & Huhndorf (2002)

= Ruzenia =

Genus of fungi

Ruzenia is a genus of fungi in the Helminthosphaeriaceae family of the Ascomycota. The relationship of this taxon to other taxa within the Sordariomycetes class is unknown (incertae sedis), and it has not yet been placed with certainty into any order. This is a monotypic genus, containing the single species Ruzenia spermoides.
