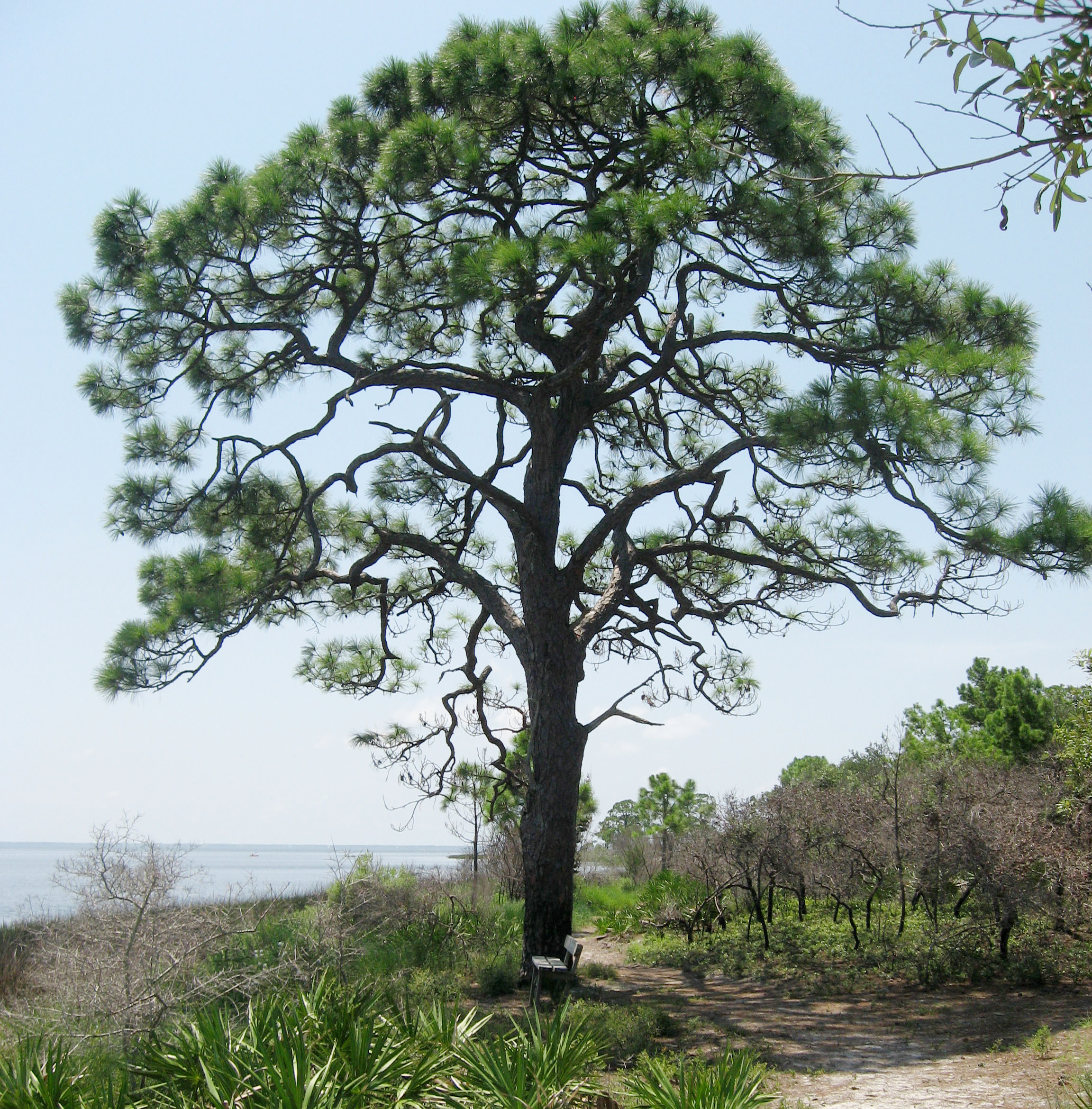

Conservation status
- Least Concern (IUCN 3.1)

Scientific classification
- Kingdom: Plantae
- Clade: Tracheophytes
- Clade: Gymnosperms
- Division: Pinophyta
- Class: Pinopsida
- Order: Pinales
- Family: Pinaceae
- Genus: Pinus
- Subgenus: P. subg. Pinus
- Section: P. sect. Trifoliae
- Subsection: P. subsect. Australes
- Species: P. elliottii

Binomial name
- Pinus elliottii Engelm.

Varieties
- Pinus elliottii var. elliottii Pinus elliottii var. densa
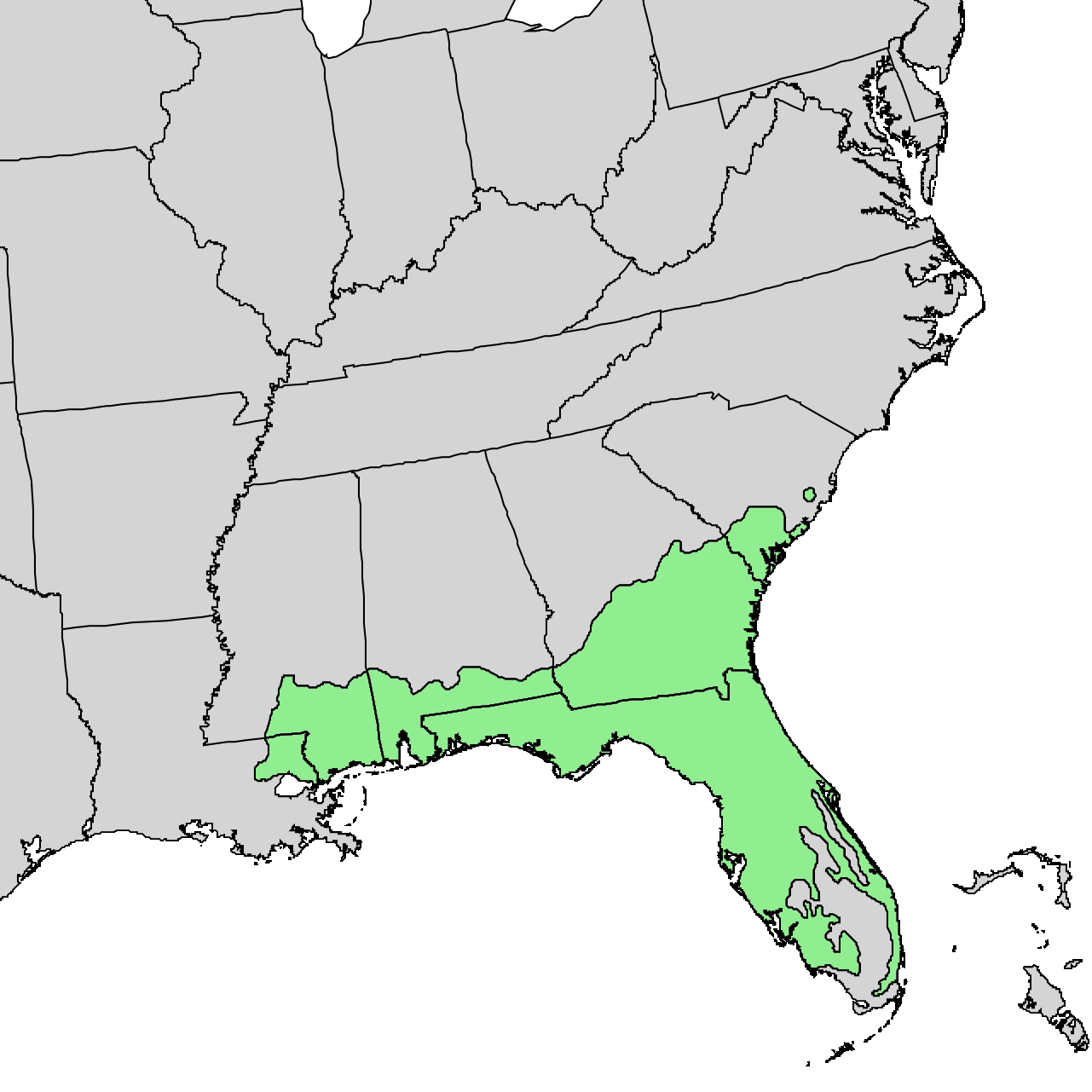
- generalized natural range of Pinus elliottii

= Pinus elliottii =

Species of conifer tree

Pinus elliottii, commonly known as slash pine, is a species of conifer in the family Pinaceae, a pine native to the coastal plain of the Southeastern United States. Slash pine is named after the "slashes" – swampy ground overgrown with trees and bushes – that constitute its habitat. Other common names include swamp pine, yellow slash pine, and southern Florida pine. Slash pine has two different varieties: P. e. var. elliottii and P. e. var. densa. Historically, slash pine has been an important economic timber for naval stores, turpentine, and resin. The wood of slash pine is known for its unusually high strength, especially for a pine. It exceeds many hardwoods and is even comparable to very dense woods such as black ironwood.

== Description and taxonomy ==
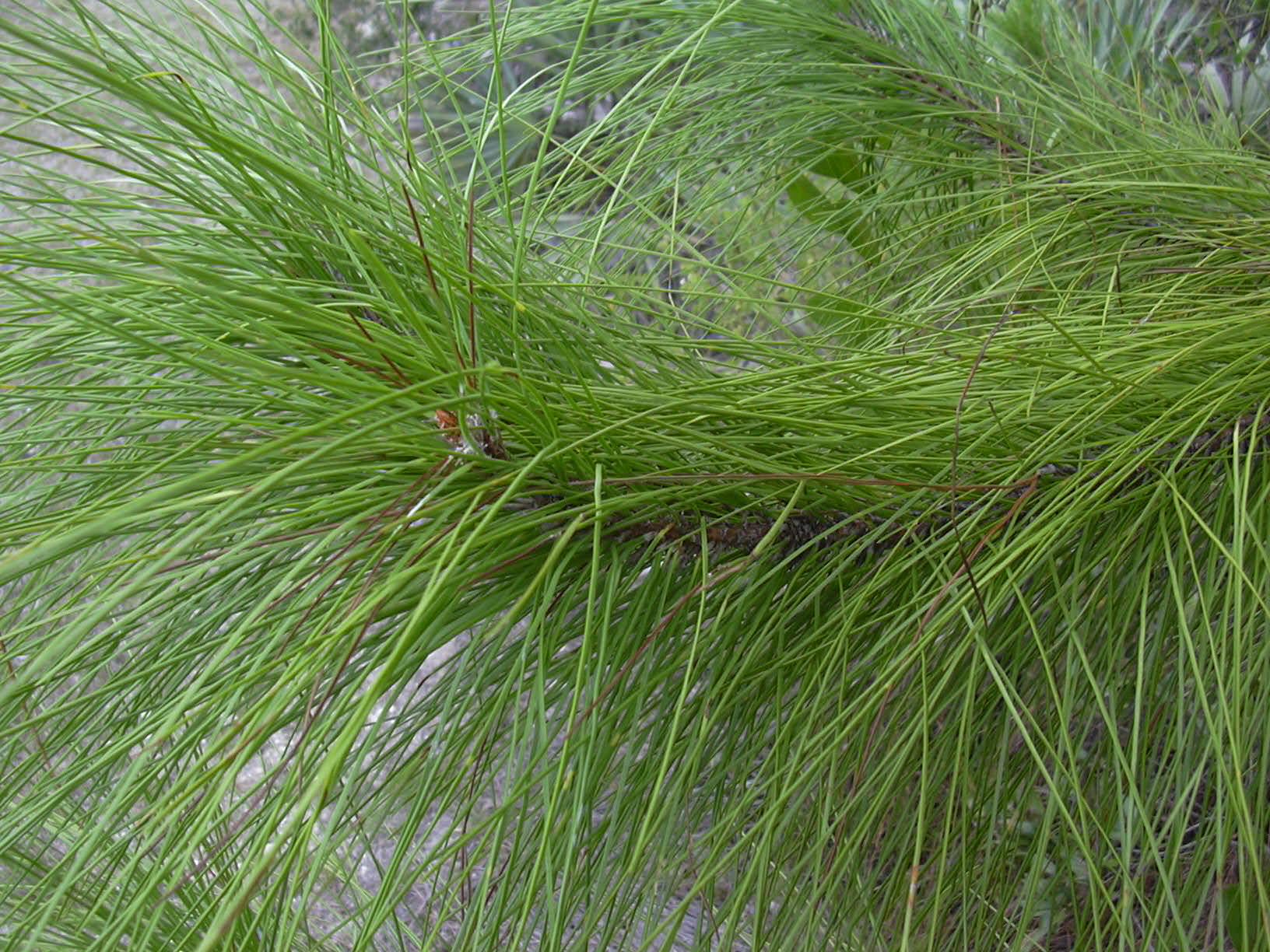
Slash pine needles

This tree is fast-growing, but not very long-lived by pine standards (to 200 years). It reaches heights of 18–30 m (59–98 ft) with a trunk diameter of 0.6–0.8 m (2.0–2.6 ft). The leaves are needle-like, very slender, in clusters of two or three, and 18–24 cm (7.1–9.4 in) long. The cones are glossy red-brown, 5–15 cm (2.0–5.9 in) in length, with a short (2–3 mm or 0.079–0.118 in), thick prickle on each scale. It is known for its conical shape and unusually high strength, especially for a pine. Its wood has an average crush strength of 8,140 lb/in^{2} (56.1 MPa), which exceeds many hardwoods such as white ash (7,410 lb/in^{2}) and black maple (6,680 lb/in^{2}). It is not as strong as black ironwood (9,940 lb/in^{2}), but because its average density is less than half that of ironwood, slash pine has a far greater strength-to-weight ratio.

It may be distinguished from the related loblolly pine (P. taeda) by the somewhat longer, glossier needles and larger red-brown cones, and from longleaf pine (P. palustris) by the shorter, more slender needles and smaller cones with less broad scales.

Two varieties of P. elliotii are described, but recent genetic studies have indicated that the varieties may not be more closely related to each other than they are to other pines in the Southeast. If this is the case, reclassifying these varieties as separate species would be warranted. P. elliottii can hybridize with P. taeda, sand pine (Pinus clausa), and P. palustris.

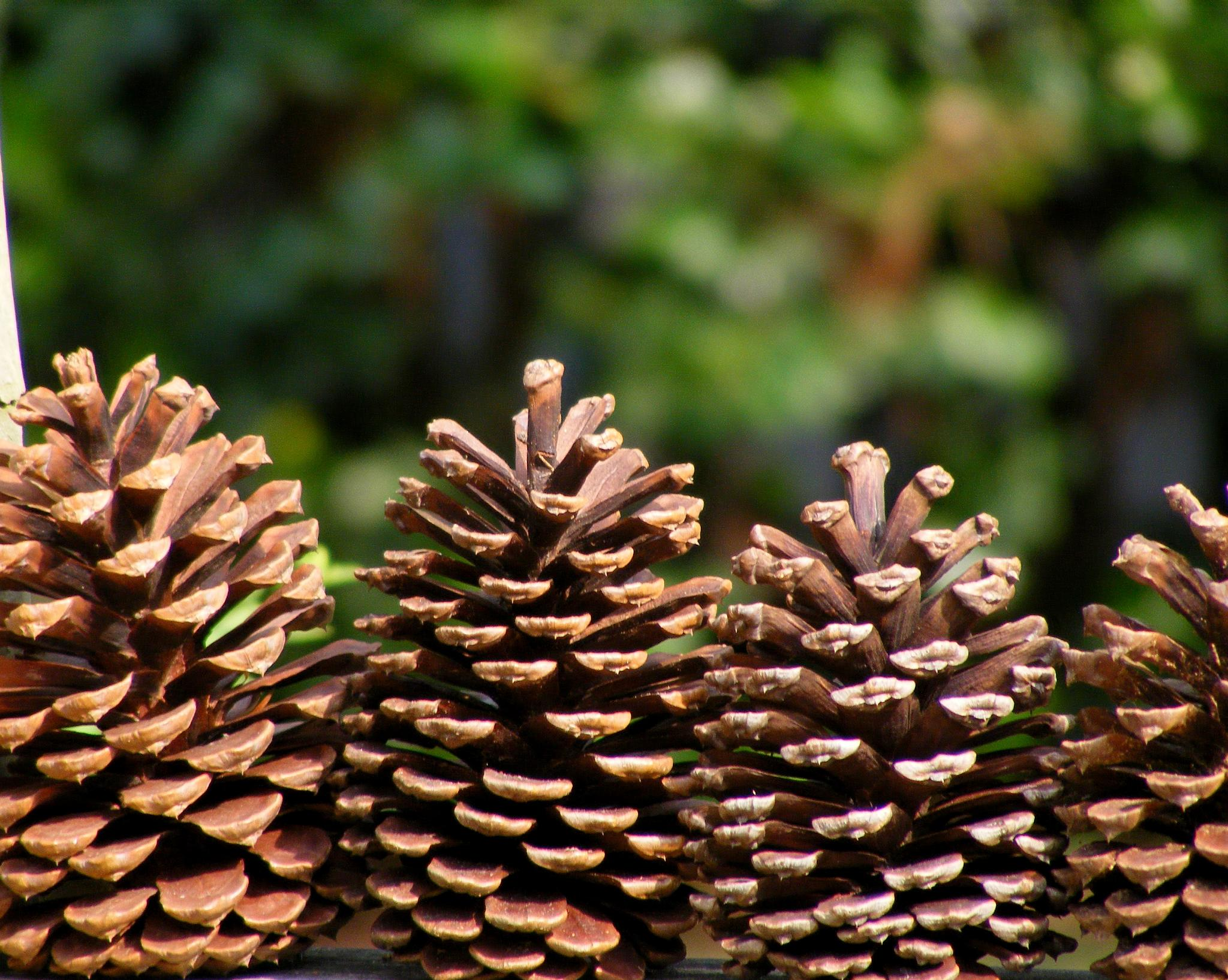
Pinus elliottii cones

The two commonly accepted varieties are the following:

- P. e. var. elliottii (typical slash pine) ranges from South Carolina to Louisiana, and south to central Florida. Its leaves occur in bundles, fascicles of twos and threes, mostly threes, and the cones are larger, 7–15 cm (2.8–5.9 in).
- P. e. var. densa (South Florida slash pine, Dade County pine) is found in the pine rocklands of southern Florida and the Florida Keys, including the Everglades. Leaves are nearly all in bundles of two, with longer needles. The cones are smaller, 5–12 cm (2.0–4.7 in), the wood is denser, and the tree has a thicker taproot. Unlike the typical variety of slash pine, seedlings of P. e. var. densa has a "grass stage" similar to longleaf pine. P. e. var. densa is not frost tolerant, which limits its range to South Florida.

== Range and habitat ==
Communities dominated by slash pine are termed "slash pine forests". Slash pine is predominately found in Florida and Georgia, and extends from South Carolina west to southeastern Louisiana, and south to the Florida Keys. It is common in East Texas, where it was first planted at the E.O. Siecke State Forest in 1926. The natural habitat is sandy subtropical maritime forests and wet flatwoods. Slash pine generally grows better in warm, humid areas where the average annual temperature is above 17 °C (63 °F), with extreme ranges from −18 to 41 °C (0 to 106 °F). Factors such as competition, fire, and precipitation may limit the natural distribution of these trees. Slash pines are able to grow in an array of soils, but pine stands that are close to bodies of water such as swamps and ponds grow better because of higher soil moisture and seedling protection from wildfire. These forests have been managed through controlled fires since the beginning of the 20th century. Within the first year, P. elliottii is particularly susceptible to seedling mortality caused by fire. P. e. var. densa is more fire resistant than P. e. var. elliottii because it has thicker bark.

== Fire ecology ==
=== History ===
Fire has long been an important element in Southeastern forests. Native Americans burned land to improve grass growth for grazing and visibility for hunting. When European settlers arrived in the New World, they brought new diseases that severely diminished the Native American populations. Over time, with the lack of consistent burning, much of the open land of the South reverted to forest land. Logging began to increase in the Southeast, which created some tension between the loggers and local farmers. The loggers wanted to continue to burn the forest, but the local farmers were concerned about how burning would affect cattle grazing and turpentine production. Fire maintenance has long been a controversial issue. In the 1940s, the Smokey Bear campaign to prevent wildfires promoted a shift toward fire suppression. Subsequently, many of these fire-dependent ecosystems became increasingly dominated by more shade-tolerant tree species (hardwoods). Despite many reports from the U.S. Forest Service about the benefits fire has on forage production, pine regeneration, control of tree pathogens, and reducing risks of wildfires, controlled burning did not begin to regain traction until the 1950s and 1960s.

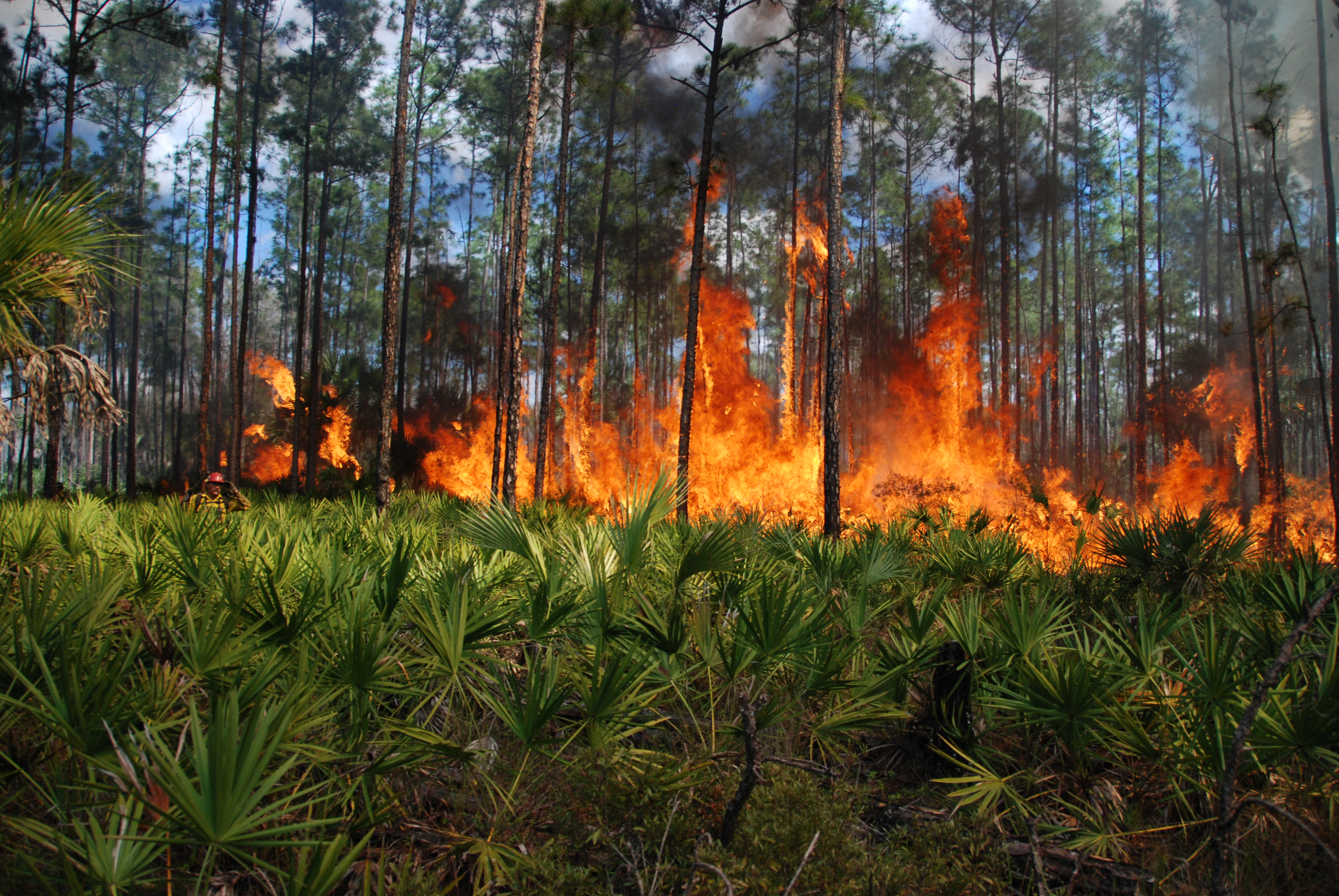
Controlled burn in a slash pine forest

=== Uses ===
Without regular fire intervals in slash pine forests, the ecosystem can change over time. For example, in the northern range for slash pine, forests can convert from mesic flatwoods to denser mixed-hardwood canopies with trees such as oaks, hickory, and southern magnolia. In South Florida, the pine rocklands can convert to a rockland hammock dominated by woody shrubs and invasive plants. Invasive species are a major management issue in the South. Many pine trees and native plants are adapted to fire, meaning they require fire disturbance to open their pine cones, germinate seeds, and cue other metabolic processes. Fire can be a good management strategy for invasive species because many invasive plants are not adapted to fire. Therefore, fire can eliminate the parental plant or reduce seed viability. Controlled burning is also used to help reduce pathogen load in an ecosystem. For example, fire can eliminate pest populations or resting fungal spores that could infect new seedlings. Low-intensity burns can also clear space in the understory and provide nutrient pulses that benefit the understory vegetation.

Fire is also used to prevent "fuel" buildup, the highly flammable plants such as grasses and scrub under the canopy that could burn easily in a wildfire. Most prescribed burn intervals are about every 2–5 years, which allows the ecosystem to regenerate after the burn. Much of the South Florida pine rockland ecosystem is highly fragmented and has not been burned because of the proximity to buildings. Risks such as smoke, air quality, and residual particulate matter in the environment pose safety issues for controlled burns near homes and businesses.

== Diseases and pests ==
=== Fusiform rust ===
Starting in the late 1950s, the emergence of fusiform rust on Southeastern pine trees including slash pine, loblolly pine, and longleaf pine led to massive tree mortality within the pine industry. This obligate parasitic pathogen is notorious for infecting young trees in newly planted areas within the first few years of growing. The pine industry was still rather new at the time of this initial outbreak, so many newly planted forests had large-scale mortality because the trees were not yet old enough to be resilient to the disease or harvested. Florida's pine industry in particular was booming with an increase in plantation acreage from 291,000 acres (118,000 ha) in 1952 to upwards of 5.59 million acres (2,260,000 ha) in 1990. Because of the complicated lifecycle of Cronaritum quercuum f. sp. fusiforme, the fungal causal agent of fusiform rust, the management strategies of pruning diseased stems, reducing fertilization, and discarding infected seed were not sufficient to prevent million-dollar annual loses.

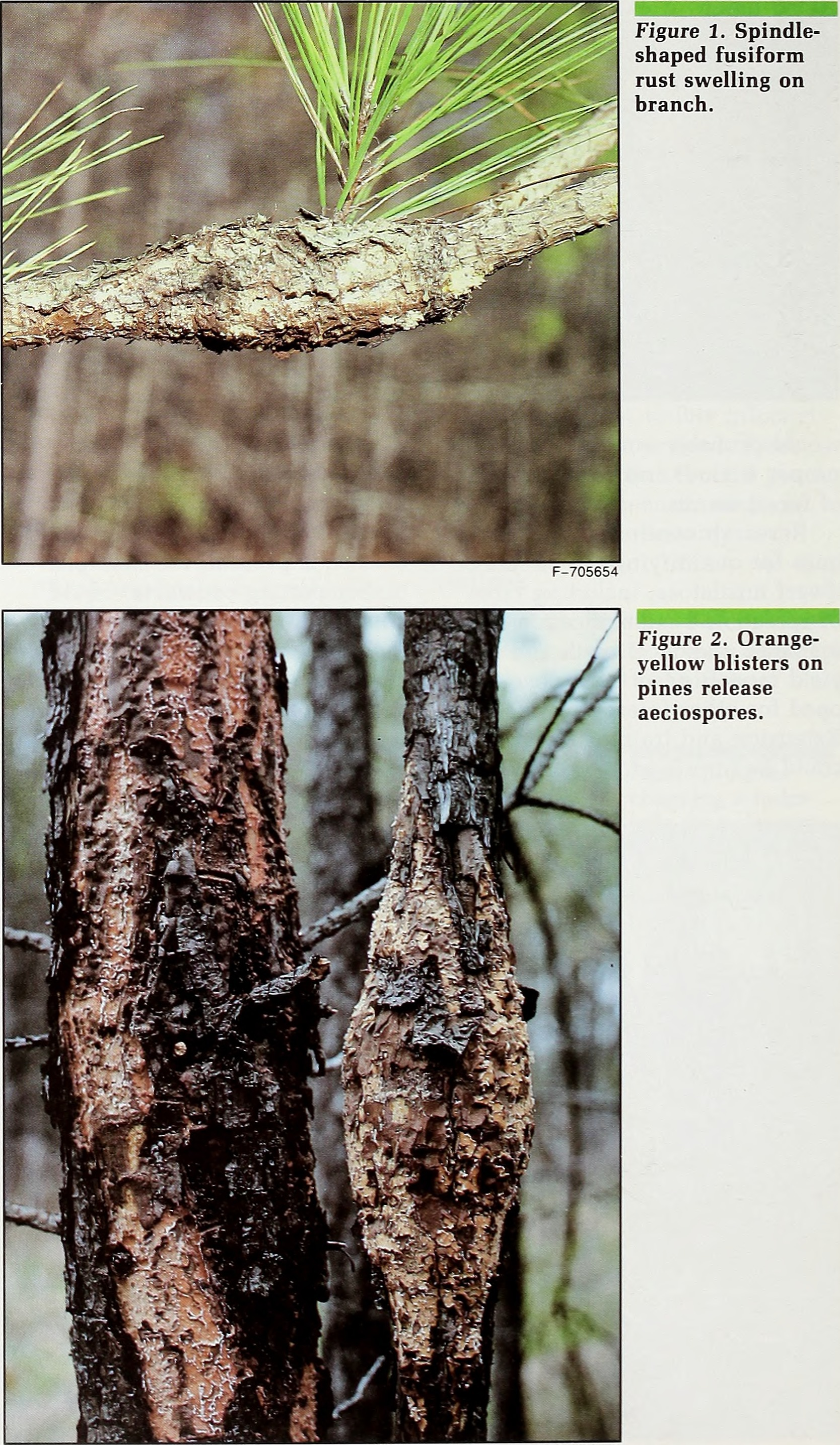
Example of fusiform rust symptoms on pine tree bark

Rust pathogens are difficult to manage because of their complicated reproductive lifecycles. C. querecuum f. sp. fusiforme is heteroecious, requiring two different plant hosts for reproduction, and is macrocyclic, meaning it contains all five spore stages typical for rust infections: basidiospores, teliospores, urediniospores, aeciospores, and spermatia. Oak trees are the secondary host for this pathogen. The primary inocula on pine are basidiospores, which infect the pine needles between March and May. The basidiospores germinate and grow into the stems of the tree where the fungus can overwinter for 4–6 months in the wood. In the fall, the spermatia form and fertilize the aeciospores in the following spring. The aceiospores are released from the pine and are the primary inocula that infect the oak trees in the following growing season. Aceiospores grow through the oak leaves producing urediniospores on the underside of the oak leaves. These urediniospores can reproduce clonally, asexually, and can continue to infect oak plants as a secondary inoculum. Within two weeks of the primary urediniospore inoculation on the oak tree, teliospores are formed which germinate into basidiospores that infect the pine trees and complete the life rust cycle. Symptoms on the pine include gall formation, stem swelling, cankers, bushiness, and dieback. The cankers in the stem allow secondary fungal infections or other pests to enter the trees easily.

Understanding the climate conditions that can lead to rust outbreaks is an important component for management strategies, but this was not well understood in the early decades of this epidemic. More recent information has shown that certain weather patterns such as high humidity, wet pine needles, and temperatures around 15–29 °C (59–84 °F) for about 18 days can increase the spread of basiodiospores, so increase disease severity.

=== Managing fusiform rust ===
There are many ways to go about reducing high-hazard areas for fusiform rust, but it starts with understanding why fusiform rust occurs more often during certain instances than others. Even though we have seen newer genetic work from seedling nurseries that has helped loblolly and slash pine become more resilient to fusiform rust, it is not always the case that landowners want to or can afford to buy the genetically modified seedlings so there are a couple of ways to help reduce the possibility of fusiform rust infected trees. The first initial step to take to reduce fusiform rust infection is to reduce the amount of site preparation used to establish the stand. These site preps, while desired, cause increased rapid growth of pines. When this happens the outer layer of bark is thin enough for fusiform rust to infect and often it will be the main stem. When loblolly pine reach around the age of eight years old you can use more fertilization and forest prescriptions because at this time fusiform rust is not as likely to infect the main stem. Due to oaks being the alternate host for fusiform rust, where it lives out three of its spore lifecycles, it is a good idea to remove any hardwoods that are adjacent to your loblolly stand. This can be difficult considering that oaks also share an importance in the economic and environmental aspect of the Southeast. Doing this will allow the pathogen to hit a dead end. In an older loblolly plantation, it is safe to keep those trees in rotation if the disease is not along the stem of the tree.

=== Pitch canker ===
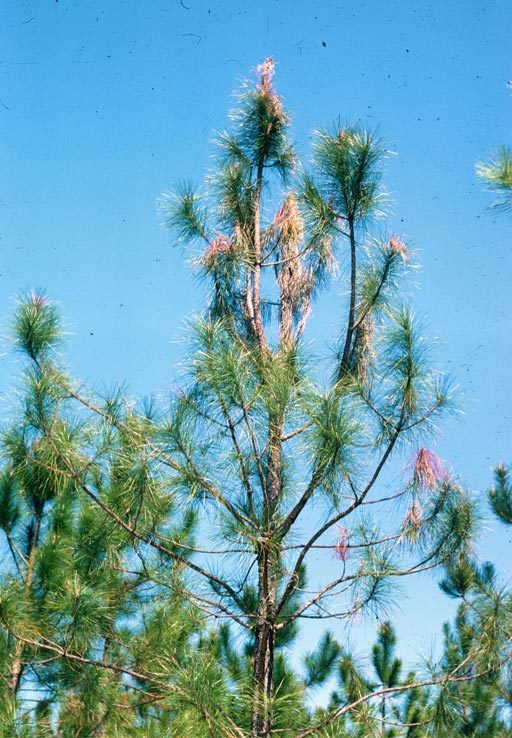
Example of Pitch Canker symptoms on a slash pine tree

Pitch canker, a monocyclic disease caused by the fungus Fusarium circinatum (previously named Fusarium moniliforme var. subglutinans), was first described in 1946 by Hepting and Roth. When it was first described, disease levels were low until the 1970s, when a massive epidemic of pitch canker caused mass tree mortality in Florida slash pine. Some hypotheses suggest that the pathogen may have originated in Mexico and was then introduced in Florida and later transmitted to California on diseased seed. The pathogen has been reported in Mexico; however, high fungal diversity and low tree mortality from the disease suggests that this pathogen may have co-evolved in Mexico before being introduced to other parts of the world. Many reports describe the pathogen as endemic to Florida, likely because the disease was introduced a long time therefore the population has become more diverse. By 1974, over half of the slash pine population in Florida was infected with Fusarium circinatum disease. In areas where the pathogen is newly introduced, the fungal population is mostly clonal, because fewer mating types are present within the population, so sexual reproduction may be lower. Pitch canker infects nearly all pine species, including longleaf pine, shortleaf pine, and eastern white pine.

This disease continues to be a problem in nurseries, and has been reported in other countries. A major problem in Florida is that artificial replanting of pines may be contributing to high disease incidences. The disease can be passed through seed and spores, but requires open wounds to infect the tree from insect damage, mechanical damage, hail/weather damage, etc.

The predominant symptoms include needle chlorosis and reddening of shoots (called "flagging") that later die. Cankers or lesions that form on the trunks can turn the bark yellow or dark brown and cause resin to exude. Stems may die and get crystalized in resin-soaked lesions. Resin is generally produced in plants to protect against pathogens. Sometimes, the tissue above the canker dies, causing girdling of the stem. The severity of the disease depends on weather conditions and may require moisture and insect wounds or hail to infect the trees. Some insects such as bark beetles, spittle bugs, weevils, pine tip moths, and needle midges may vector the disease into the tree. F. circinatum was used to inoculate P. e. var. densa trees to try to increase resin production for extraction, but this approach was ineffective.

== Other fungi ==
Fungus species Thozetella pinicola was found on leaf litter of Pinus elliottii Engelm. in Hong Kong in 2009.

== Uses ==
This tree is widely grown in tree plantations. It is also used in horticulture. It is hardy to USDA zones 7a-11.

== See also ==
- Southern yellow pine
