= Chaetosphaeria =

Scientific classification
- Kingdom: Fungi
- Division: Ascomycota
- Class: Sordariomycetes
- Order: Chaetosphaeriales
- Family: Chaetosphaeriaceae
- Genus: Chaetosphaeria; Tul. & C.Tul.

Type species
- Chaetosphaeria innumera Berk. & Broome ex Tul. & C.Tul.

Genus of fungi

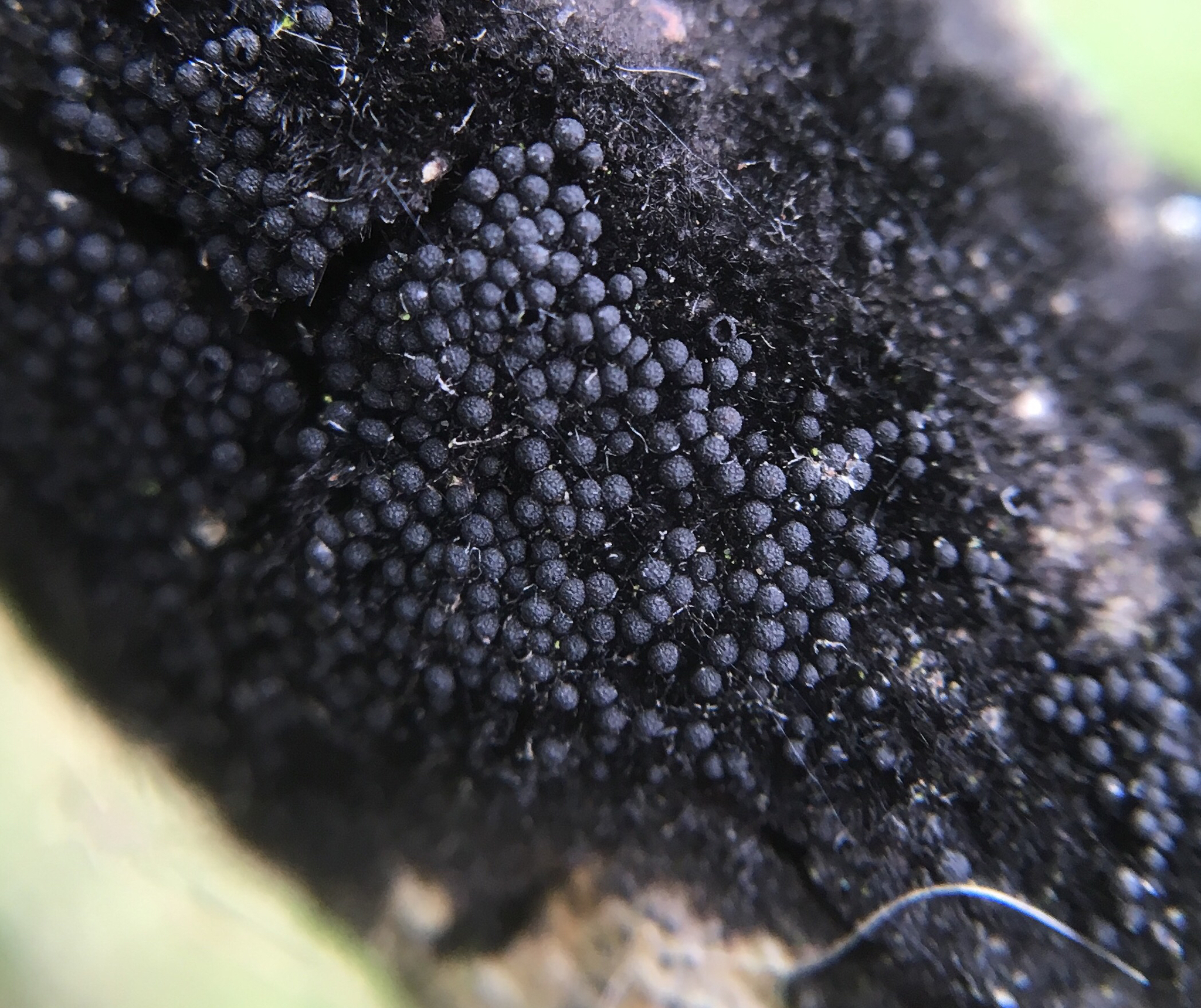
Chaetosphaeria phaeostromoides

Chaetosphaeria is a genus of fungi in the family Chaetosphaeriaceae.

Réblová & Gams in 2016 then studied the type material of Acanthosphaeria (formerly a genus in the Trichosphaeriaceae family, Trichosphaeriales order) and then relegated this genus to a synonym of genus Chaetosphaeria.

== Species ==
As accepted by Species Fungorum;

- Chaetosphaeria abietis (Höhn.) W. Gams & Hol.-Jech. (1976)
- Chaetosphaeria acutata Réblová & W. Gams (1999)
- Chaetosphaeria ampulliformis Sivan. & H.S. Chang (1997)
- Chaetosphaeria anglica P.J. Fisher & Petrini (1983)
- Chaetosphaeria aquatica Z.L. Luo, K.D. Hyde & H.Y. Su (2019)
- Chaetosphaeria arecacensis K.D. Hyde, Goh, Joanne E. Taylor & J. Fröhl. (1999)
- Chaetosphaeria aspergilloides M.E. Barr & J.L. Crane (1979)
- Chaetosphaeria atriella (Cooke & Ellis) M.E. Barr (1993)
- Chaetosphaeria atrobarba (Cooke & Ellis) Sacc. (1883)
- Chaetosphaeria barbicincta (Ellis & Everh.) M.E. Barr (1993)
- Chaetosphaeria bicellula Panwar & S.J. Kaur (1977)
- Chaetosphaeria bramleyi C. Booth (1958)
- Chaetosphaeria brasiliensis (Höhn.) E. Müll. (1962)
- Chaetosphaeria brevicollis (Niessl) E. Müll. (1962)
- Chaetosphaeria brevispora Shoemaker (1968)
- Chaetosphaeria bromeliae Gonz. Frag. & Cif. (1926)
- Chaetosphaeria caelestina Höhn. (1909)
- Chaetosphaeria caesariata (Clinton & Peck) F.A. Fernández & Huhndorf (2005)
- Chaetosphaeria caespitulosa Höhn. (1924)
- Chaetosphaeria capitata Sivan. & H.S. Chang (1995)
- Chaetosphaeria chalaroides Hol.-Jech. (1984)
- Chaetosphaeria chlorotunicata F.A. Fernández & Huhndorf (2005)
- Chaetosphaeria ciliata Réblová & Seifert (2008)
- Chaetosphaeria coelestina Höhn. (1909)
- Chaetosphaeria coelestinoides Teng (1936)
- Chaetosphaeria conirostris F.A. Fernández & Huhndorf (2005)
- Chaetosphaeria crustacea (Sacc.) Réblová & W. Gams (1999)
- Chaetosphaeria cubensis Hol.-Jech. (1982)
- Chaetosphaeria curvispora Réblová (2004)
- Chaetosphaeria cylindrospora F.A. Fernández, Huhndorf, Joanne E. Taylor & K.D. Hyde (2001)
- Chaetosphaeria decastyla (Cooke) Réblová & W. Gams (1999)
- Chaetosphaeria dickasonii Wehm. (1963)
- Chaetosphaeria dilabens Réblová & W. Gams (2000)
- Chaetosphaeria dingleyae S. Hughes, W.B. Kendr. & Shoemaker (1968)
- Chaetosphaeria elegans Rick (1906)
- Chaetosphaeria endophytica Petrini & Dreyfuss (1981)
- Chaetosphaeria eximia Sacc. (1916)
- Chaetosphaeria exserticlavoides Réblová & Seifert (2003)
- Chaetosphaeria falacrospora Réblová & Seifert (2003)
- Chaetosphaeria fennica (P. Karst.) Réblová & W. Gams (1999)
- Chaetosphaeria fuegiana Réblová (2004)
- Chaetosphaeria fusichalaroides Réblová (2004)
- Chaetosphaeria fusiformis W. Gams & Hol.-Jech. (1981)
- Chaetosphaeria fusispora (Kawam.) I. Hino (1932)
- Chaetosphaeria gallica (Sacc. & Flageolet) Réblová (2004)
- Chaetosphaeria guttulata Z.L. Luo, K.D. Hyde & H.Y. Su (2019)
- Chaetosphaeria hainanensis Teng (1935)
- Chaetosphaeria hebetiseta Réblová & W. Gams (2000)
- Chaetosphaeria helicteris R. Rao (1971)
- Chaetosphaeria hinoi Dôke (1947)
- Chaetosphaeria hiugensis I. Hino (1938)
- Chaetosphaeria hongkongensis K.D. Hyde, Goh, Joanne E. Taylor & J. Fröhl. (1999)
- Chaetosphaeria inaequalis (Grove) W. Gams & Hol.-Jech. (1976)
- Chaetosphaeria incrustans Rick (1904)
- Chaetosphaeria innumera Berk. & Broome ex Tul. & C. Tul. (1863)
- Chaetosphaeria latericolla (DC.) Riedl (1974)
- Chaetosphaeria lentomita W. Gams & Hol.-Jech. (1976)
- Chaetosphaeria lignicola (Munk) Tomilin (1972)
- Chaetosphaeria lignomollis F.A. Fernández & Huhndorf (2005)
- Chaetosphaeria luquillensis F.A. Fernández & Huhndorf (2005)
- Chaetosphaeria macrospora (Kawam.) Hara (1930)
- Chaetosphaeria mangrovei Dayar., E.B.G. Jones & K.D. Hyde (2018)
- Chaetosphaeria meliolicola Syd. & P. Syd. (1914)
- Chaetosphaeria metallicans T.J. Atk., A.N. Mill. & Huhndorf (2007)
- Chaetosphaeria minuta F.A. Fernández & Huhndorf (2005)
- Chaetosphaeria multiseptata Wehm. (1942)
- Chaetosphaeria myriadea (Curzi) E. Müll. (1962)
- Chaetosphaeria myriocarpa (Fr.) C. Booth (1957)
- Chaetosphaeria nagatensis I. Hino & Katum. (1954)
- Chaetosphaeria obovoidea J.Y. Zhang & Y.Z. Lu (2022)
- Chaetosphaeria patelliformis Rick (1933)
- Chaetosphaeria perforata Teng (1936)
- Chaetosphaeria pileoferruginea P. Crouan & H. Crouan (1867)
- Chaetosphaeria polygonalis J. Yang, Jian K. Liu & K.D. Hyde (2023)
- Chaetosphaeria poonensis Kalani (1964)
- Chaetosphaeria preussii W. Gams & Hol.-Jech. (1976)
- Chaetosphaeria puiggarii Speg. (1918)
- Chaetosphaeria pulchriseta S. Hughes, W.B. Kendr. & Shoemaker (1968)
- Chaetosphaeria pygmaea (P. Karst.) Constant., K. Holm & L. Holm (1995)
- Chaetosphaeria rivularis Réblová & J. Fourn. (2015)
- Chaetosphaeria saltuensis K.D. Hyde, Goh, Joanne E. Taylor & J. Fröhl. (1999)
- Chaetosphaeria subcaespitosa P. Larsen (1952)
- Chaetosphaeria thalictri Clem. (1903)
- Chaetosphaeria tortuosa Réblová, Seifert & G.P. White (2006)
- Chaetosphaeria trianguloconidia Réblová & Seifert (2003)
- Chaetosphaeria tubulicollaris Réblová & Seifert (2003)
- Chaetosphaeria vermicularioides (Sacc. & Roum.) W. Gams & Hol.-Jech. (1976)
- Chaetosphaeria verruculospora Réblová & Seifert (2003)
- Chaetosphaeria yosie-hidakae I. Hino (1938)
