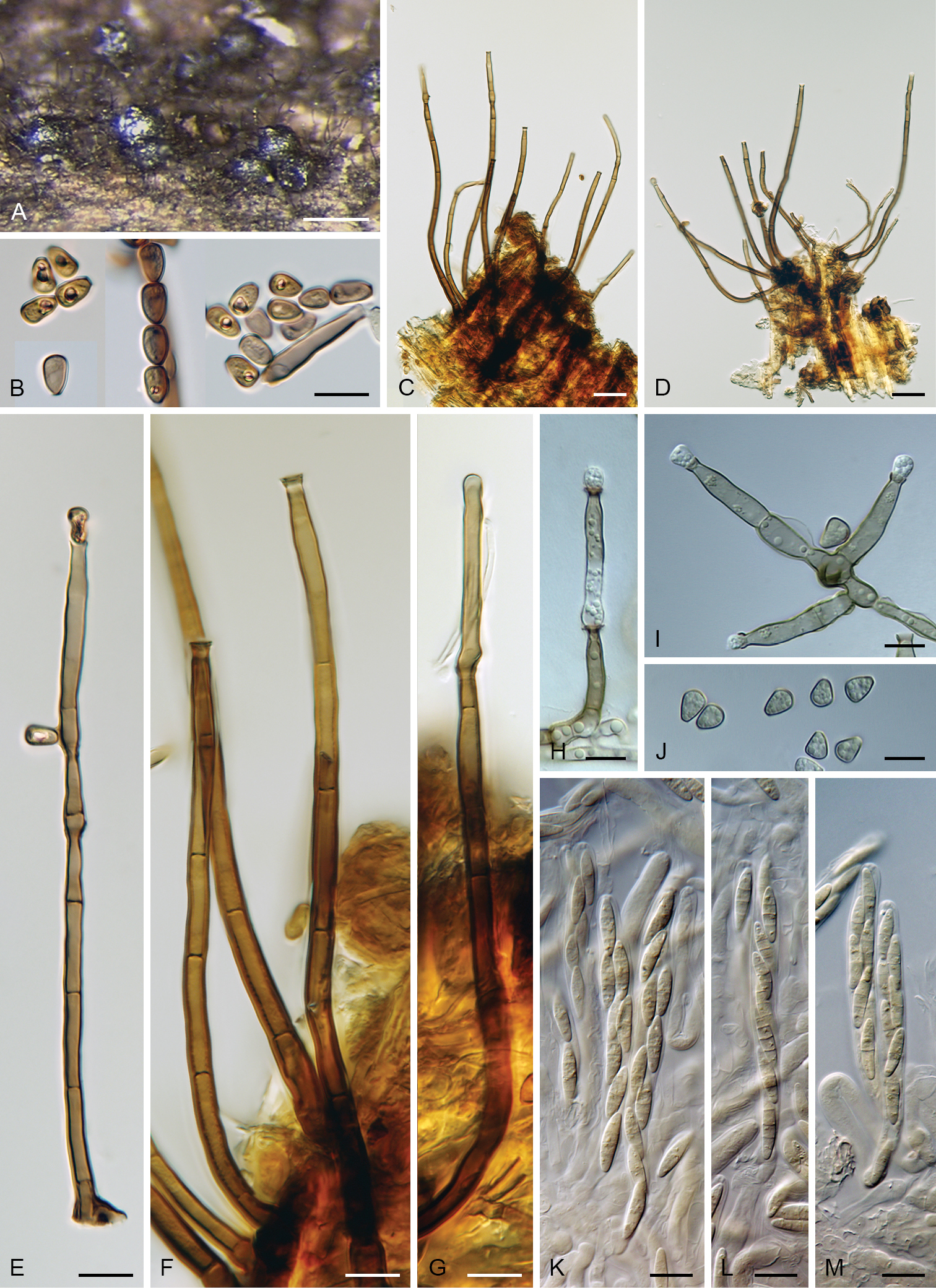
- Catenularia cubensis

Scientific classification
- Kingdom: Fungi
- Division: Ascomycota
- Class: Sordariomycetes
- Order: Chaetosphaeriales
- Family: Chaetosphaeriaceae; Réblová, M.E.Barr & Samuels (1999)

Type genus
- Chaetosphaeria Tul. & C.Tul. (1863)

= Chaetosphaeriaceae =

Family of fungi

The Chaetosphaeriaceae are a family of fungi in the Ascomycota, class Sordariomycetes. The family was circumscribed by Martina Réblová, Margaret Elizabeth Barr Bigelow, and Gary Samuels in 1999. Species in the family have a cosmopolitan distribution, and are found in both temperate and tropical climates. Fossils of the Chaetosphaeriaceae are known from the Carboniferous, Eocene, Oligocene, Miocene and more recent sediments.

== Genera ==
As accepted by GBIF;

- Adautomilanezia Gusmão, S.S.Silva, Fiuza, L.A.Costa & T.A.B.Santos (2)
- Anaexserticlava T.S.Santa Izabel, R.F.Castañeda & Gusmão (1)
- Aposphaeriella (1)
- Ascochalara Réblová (1)
- Calvolachnella Marinc., T.A.Duong & M.J.Wingf., 2016 (2)
- Catenularia Grove, 1886 (16)
- Chaetolentomita (1)
- Chaetosphaeria Tul. & C.Tul., 1863 (184)
- Chloridium Link (45)
- Cirrhomyces (1)
- Codinaea Maire (21)
- Conicomyces R.C.Sinclair, Eicker & Morgan-Jones, 1983 (5)
- Craspedodidymum Holubová-Jechová, 1972 (14)
- Cylindrotrichum Bonord. (28)
- Dendrophoma Sacc. (9)
- Dictyochaeta Speg., 1923 (87)
- Dictyochaetopsis Aramb. & Cabello (13)
- Didymopsamma (1)
- Eucalyptostroma Crous & M.J.Wingf., 2016 (4)
- Fuscocatenula Réblová & A.N.Mill., 2021 (2)
- Gonytrichum Nees & T.Nees (4)
- Hemicorynespora M.B.Ellis, 1972 (13)
- Infundibulomyces N.Plaingam, S.Somrithipol & E.B.G.Jones, 2003 (6)
- Kylindria DiCosmo et al. (13)
- Lecythothecium Réblová & Winka (1)
- Lentomita Niessl (11)
- Melanochaeta E.Müll., Harr & Sulmont, 1969 (4)
- Melanopsammina (1)
- Menispora Pers. (24)
- Menisporopascus Matsushima, 2003 (1)
- Menisporopsis S.Hughes (14)
- Mesobotrys (1)
- Miyoshiella Kawam. (2)
- Montemartinia (1)
- Morrisiella (1)
- Nawawia L.Marvanová, 1980 (8)
- Neopseudolachnella A.Hashim. & Kaz.Tanaka, 2015 (5)
- Paliphora Sivan. & B.Sutton (8)
- Paragaeumannomyces Matsushima, 2003 (14)
- Phaeostalagmus W.Gams (8)
- Phialogeniculata Matsushima, 1971 (4)
- Phialolunulospora Z.F.Yu & R.F.Castaneda, 2020 (1)
- Pseudodinemasporium A.Hashim. & Kaz.Tanaka, 2015 (2)
- Pseudolachnea Ranoj. (8)
- Pseudolachnella Teng, 1936 (26)
- Pyrigemmula D.Magyar & R.Shoemaker, 2010 (4)
- Sporoschisma Berk. & Broome (28)
- Stanjehughesia Subram. (17)
- Striatosphaeria (3)
- Tainosphaeria F.A.Fernández & Huhndorf, 2005 (9)
- Thozetella Kuntze (40)
- Thozetellopsis Agnihothr. 1958 (1)
- Trichocollonema (1)
- Uncigera P.A.Saccardo, 1885 (1)
- Verhulstia (1)
- Zanclospora S.Hughes & W.B.Kendr. (11)
- Zignoella Saccardo, 1878 (79)

Figures in brackets are approx. how many species per genus.

Former genera Australiasca now within Australiascaceae family and Porosphaerella now within Cordanaceae family.
