= Litmus milk =

Milk-based medium used to distinguish between different species of bacteria

Litmus milk is a milk-based medium used to distinguish between different species of bacteria. The lactose (milk sugar), litmus (pH indicator), and casein (milk protein) contained within the medium can all be metabolized by different types of bacteria.

Early in the development of microbiology, milk was used as a convenient, rich growth medium for propagating bacteria. The litmus in the medium acts as both a pH indicator and a redox (oxidation-reduction) indicator. The test itself tells whether the bacterium can ferment lactose, reduce litmus, form clots, form gas, or start peptonization.
