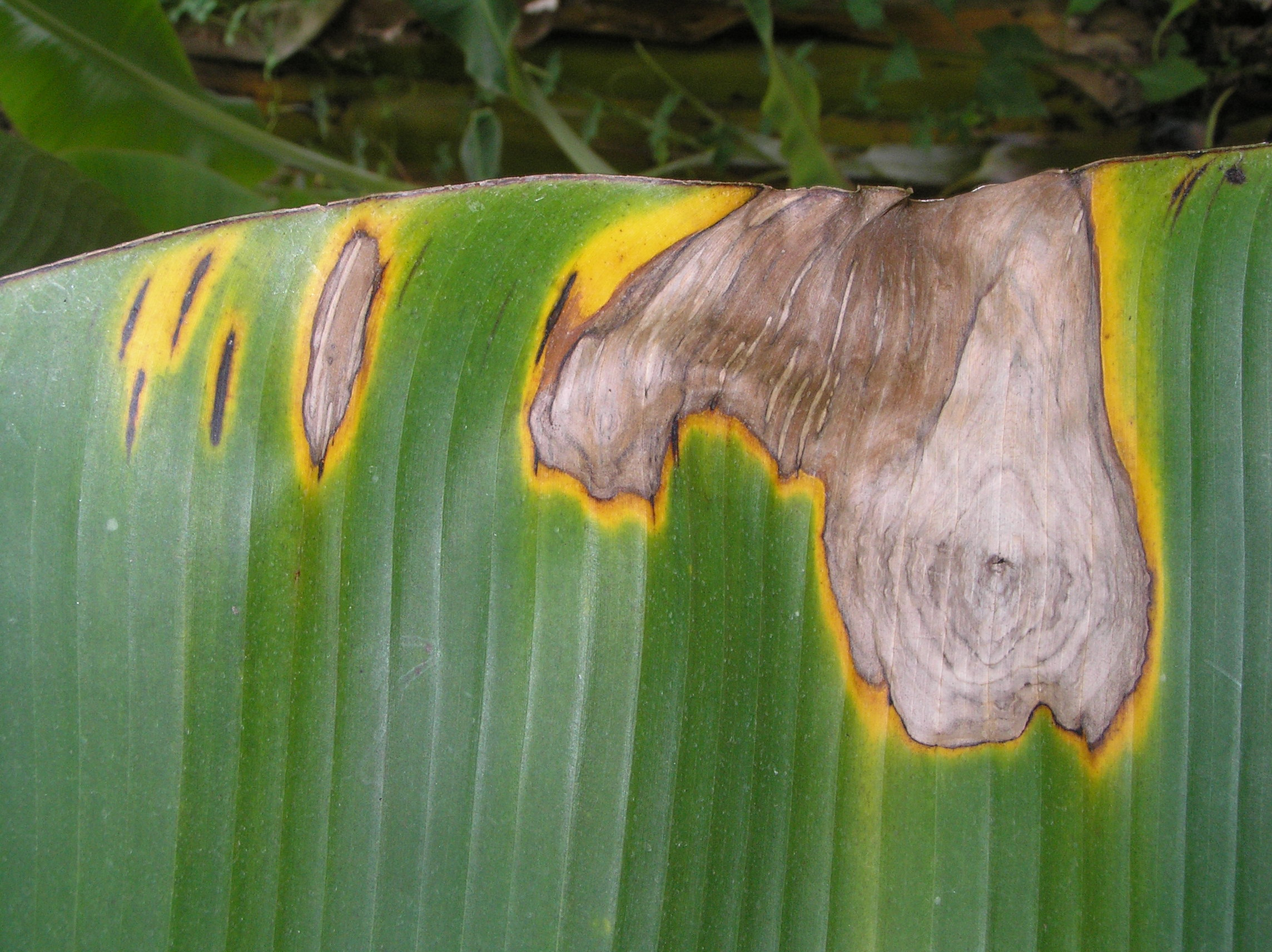
- Cordana leaf spot of banana, caused by Cordana musae

Scientific classification
- Kingdom: Fungi
- Division: Ascomycota
- Class: Sordariomycetes
- Order: Coniochaetales
- Family: Cordanaceae; Nann.
- Genus: Cordana; Preuss

Species
- See text

= Cordana =

Genus of fungi

Cordana is an ascomycete fungus genus. In 2020, it was placed within the monotypic family of Cordanaceae, and within the order Coniochaetales.

The genus name of Cordana is in honour of August Carl Joseph Corda (1809–1849), who was a Czech medical doctor and mycologist.

The genus was circumscribed by Carl Gottlieb Traugott Preuss in Linnaea Vol.24 on pages 100 and 129 in 1851.

== Species ==
There are about 24 known species;

- Cordana abramovii Seman & Davydkina (1983)
- Cordana andinopatagonica Gamundí & Aramb. (1979)
- Cordana aquatica Z.L. Luo, K.D. Hyde & H.Y. Su (2019)
- Cordana bambusae Bat. & Nascim. (1957)
- Cordana bisbyi (Timonin) Hern.-Restr., Gené & Guarro (2014)
- Cordana boothii M.B. Ellis (1976)
- Cordana crassa Tóth (1975)
- Cordana ellipsoidea de Hoog (1973)
- Cordana gilibertiae Togashi & Katsuki (1950)
- Cordana inaequalis S. Hughes (1983)
- Cordana indica Subramon. & V.G. Rao (1976)
- Cordana lignicola Z.L. Luo, K.D. Hyde & H.Y. Su (2019)
- Cordana lithuanica Markovsk. (2003)
- Cordana lushanensis C.C. Ai, Jian Ma, X.G. Zhang & R.F. Castañeda (2019)
- Cordana meilingensis C.C. Ai, Jian Ma, X.G. Zhang & R.F. Castañeda (2019)
- Cordana mercadoana Hern.-Restr., J. Mena, Gené & Guarro (2014)
- Cordana oblongispora Matsush. (1975)
- Cordana pauciseptata Preuss (1851)
- Cordana semaniae Davydkina, Melnik & Novozh. (1989)
- Cordana sinensis L. Qiu, K. Zhang, R.F. Castañeda & Jian Ma (2021)
- Cordana solitaria V. Rao & de Hoog (1986)
- Cordana terrestris (Timonin) Hern.-Restr., Gené & Guarro (2014)
- Cordana uniseptata L. Cai, McKenzie & K.D. Hyde (2004)
- Cordana verruculosa Hern.-Restr., J. Mena, Gené & Guarro (2014)

Former species;

- C. abramovii var. seychellensis K.D. Hyde & Goh (1998) = Cordana abramovii
- C. johnstonii M.B. Ellis (1971) = Neocordana johnstonii, Pyriculariaceae family
- C. miniumbonata R.F. Castañeda, Iturr. & Guarro (1999) = Pleurophragmium miniumbonatum, Ascomycota
- C. musae (Zimm.) Höhn. (1923) = Neocordana musae, Pyriculariaceae
- C. parvispora Preuss (1853) = Dactylaria parvispora, Helotiales order
- C. polyseptata Preuss (1851) = Brachysporium polyseptatum, Trichosphaeriaceae
- C. triseptata Matsush. (1975) = Exserticlava triseptata, Ascomycota
- C. vasiformis Matsush. (1975) = Exserticlava vasiformis, Ascomycota
- C. versicolor D.J. Soares & R.W. Barreto (2005) = Neocordana versicolor, Pyriculariaceae
