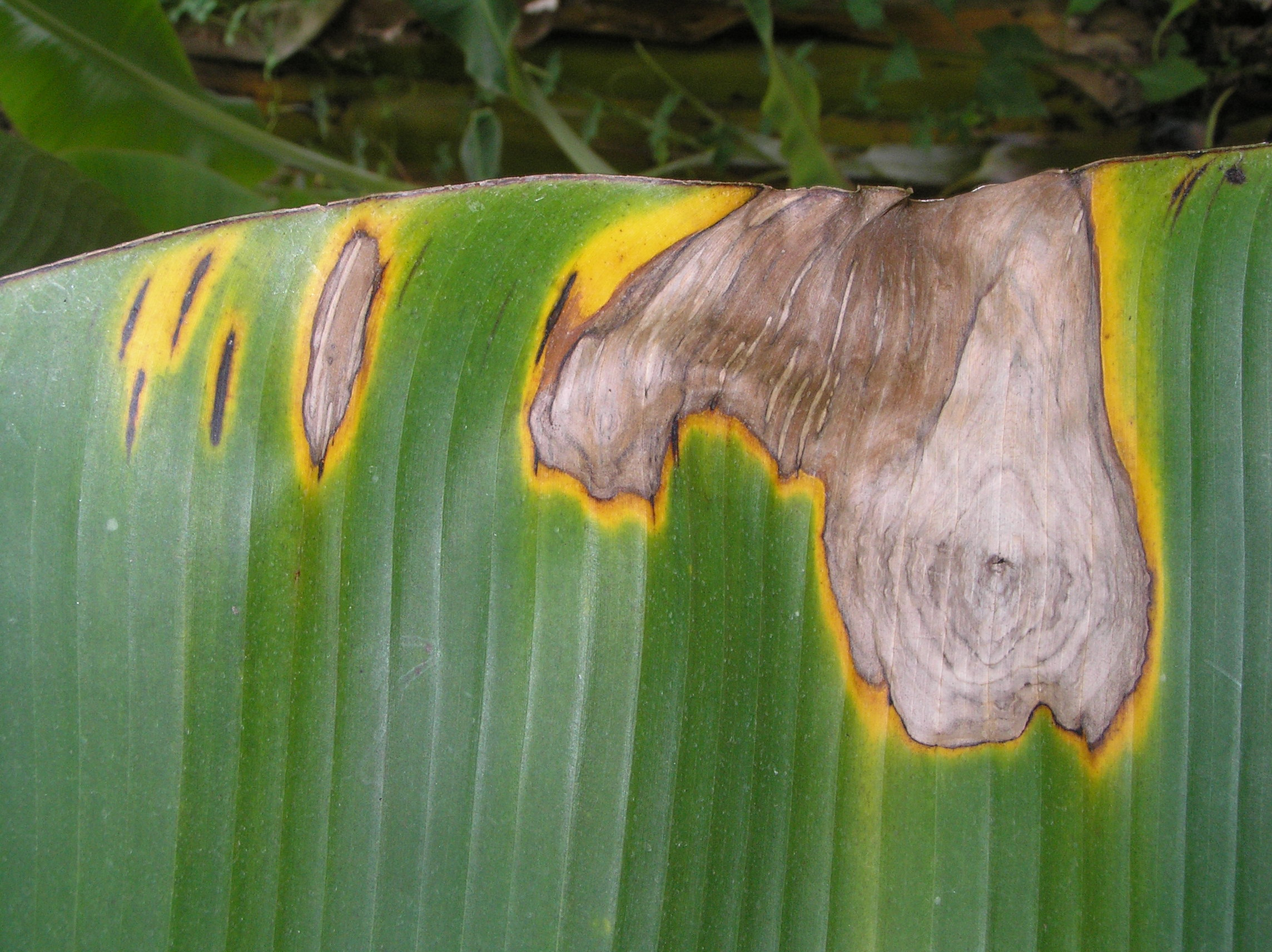
- Cordana leaf spot of banana, caused by Neocordana musae

Scientific classification
- Kingdom: Fungi
- Division: Ascomycota
- Class: Sordariomycetes
- Order: Magnaporthales
- Family: Pyriculariaceae
- Genus: Neocordana
- Species: N. musae

Binomial name
- Neocordana musae (Zimm.) Hern.-Restr. & Crous

Synonyms
- Cordana musae Sclerotium musae Scolicotrichum musae Scolicotrichum musae

= Neocordana musae =

Species of fungus

Neocordana musae (formerly Cordana musae) is an ascomycete fungus that is a plant pathogen. It produces cordana leaf spot on bananas.
