= Lasiosphaeriella =

Scientific classification
- Kingdom: Fungi
- Division: Ascomycota
- Class: Sordariomycetes
- Order: incertae sedis
- Genus: Lasiosphaeriella; Sivan.

Type species
- Lasiosphaeriella dennisii Sivan.

Genus of fungi

Lasiosphaeriella is a genus of fungi in the Sordariomycetes class (subclass Sordariomycetidae) of the Ascomycota. The relationship of this taxon to other taxa within the class is unknown (incertae sedis), and it has not yet been placed with certainty into any order or family.
