= Rimaconus =

Scientific classification
- Kingdom: Fungi
- Division: Ascomycota
- Class: Sordariomycetes
- Family: incertae sedis
- Genus: Rimaconus; Huhndorf, F.A. Fernández, J.E. Taylor & K.D. Hyde

Genus of fungi

Rimaconus is a genus of fungi within the class Sordariomycetes. The relationship of this taxon to other taxa within the class is unknown (incertae sedis).
