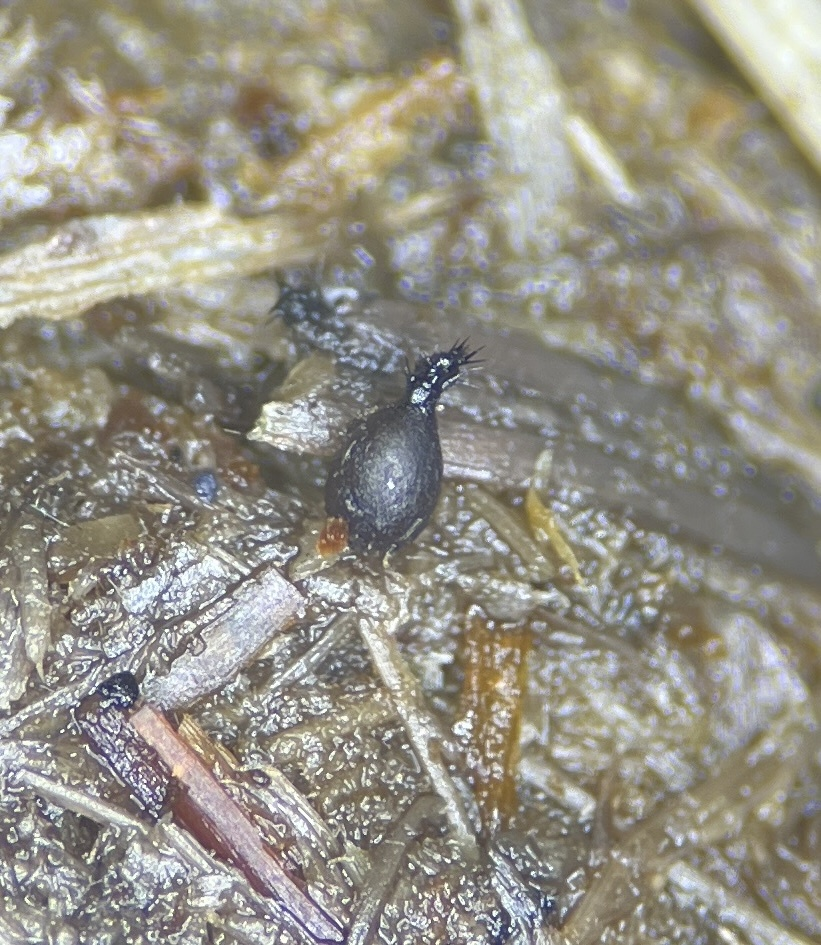
- Coniochaeta burtii

Scientific classification
- Domain: Eukaryota
- Kingdom: Fungi
- Division: Ascomycota
- Class: Sordariomycetes
- Order: Coniochaetales
- Family: Coniochaetaceae; Malloch & Cain, 1971

Genera
- See text

= Coniochaetaceae =

Family of fungi

Coniochaetaceae is a fungal family in the order Coniochaetales. The family was updated in 2020.

== Genera ==
- Barrina A.W. Ramaley (1)
- Coniochaeta (Sacc.) Cooke (81)
