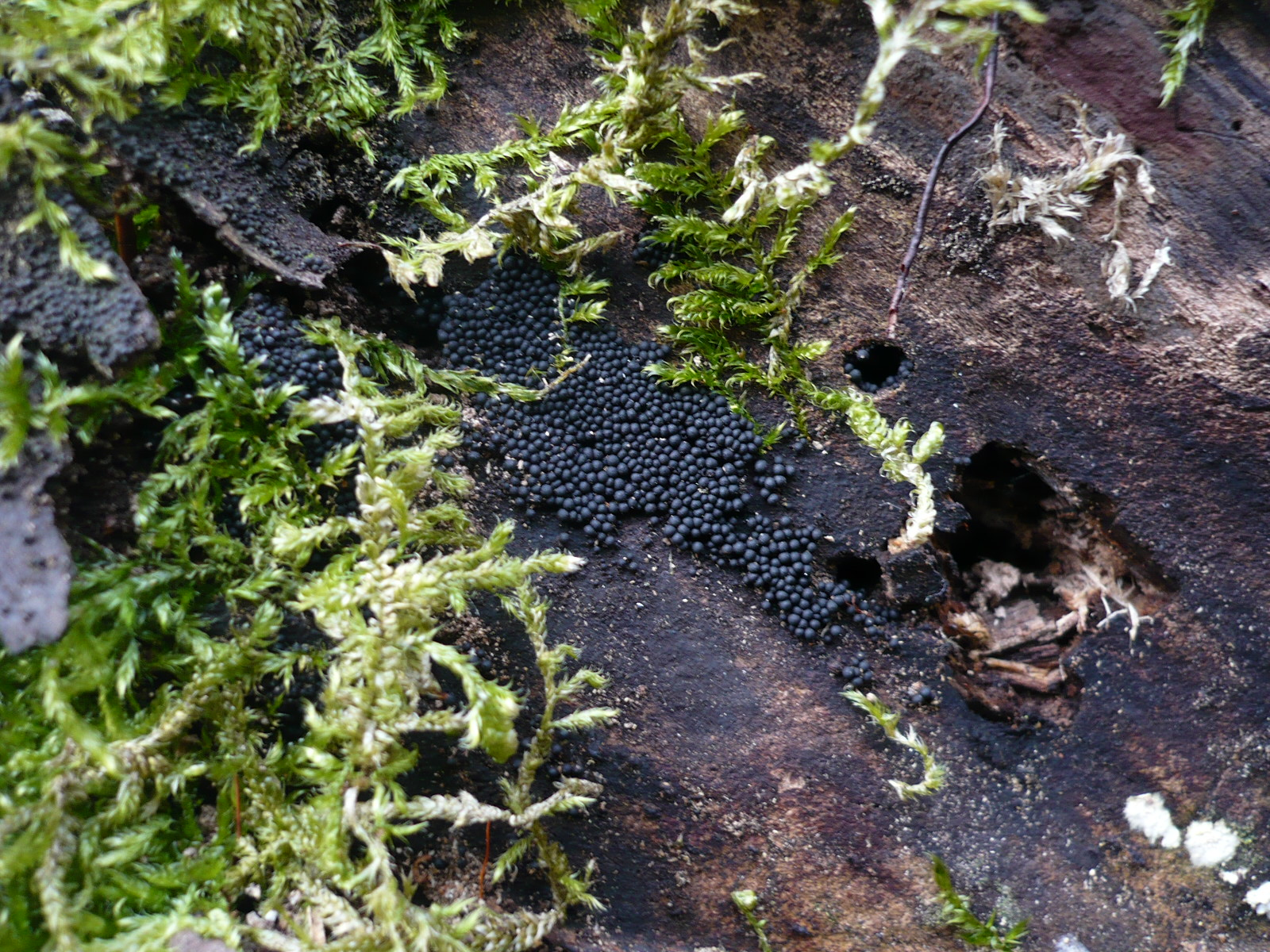

Scientific classification
- Kingdom: Fungi
- Division: Ascomycota
- Class: Sordariomycetes
- Order: Chaetosphaeriales
- Family: Helminthosphaeriaceae; Samuels, Cand. & Magni (1997)

Type genus
- Helminthosphaeria Fuckel (1870)

= Helminthosphaeriaceae =

Family of fungi

The Helminthosphaeriaceae are a family of fungi in the class Sordariomycetes. Species in this family are saprobic, often growing on rotten wood or on the fruit bodies of old mushrooms. They are distributed in temperate areas.

== Genera ==
As accepted by Wijayawardene et al. 2020 (with amount of species per genus);

- Echinosphaeria A.N. Mill. & Huhndorf (14)
- Helminthosphaeria Fuckel (ca. 20)
- Hilberina Huhndorf & A.N. Mill. (ca. 20)
- Ruzenia O. Hilber (1)
