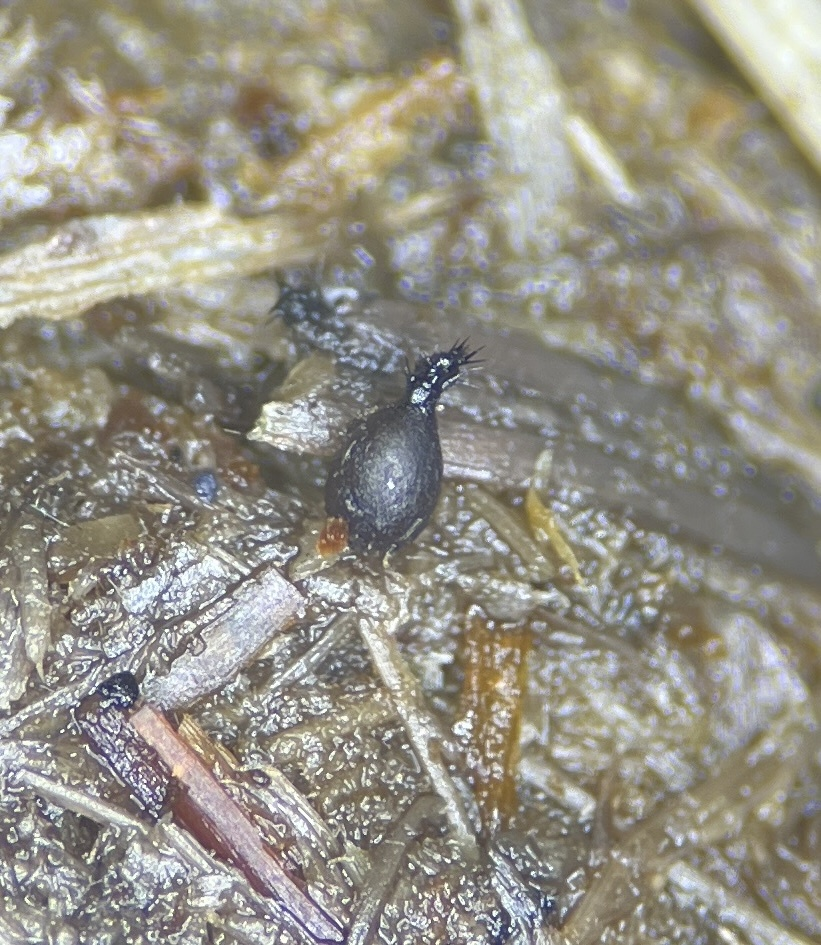
- Coniochaeta burtii

Scientific classification
- Kingdom: Fungi
- Division: Ascomycota
- Class: Sordariomycetes
- Subclass: Sordariomycetidae
- Order: Coniochaetales; Huhndorf, A.N.Mill. & F.A.Fern. (2004)

Families
- Coniochaetaceae; Cordanaceae

= Coniochaetales =

Order of fungi

The Coniochaetales are an order of fungi within the class Sordariomycetes. This order was monotypic and contained a single family, the Coniochaetaceae, historically placed in the order Sordariales. However, this taxonomic placement has been challenged by other authorities, and the Coniochaetales was proposed to include the family Coniochaetaceae. In 2020, family Cordanaceae (with its monotypic genus Cordana Preuss and various species) was added to the order.

Species in this family are characterized by having germ-slits in the ascospores, a morphological feature that distinguishes them from species in the Sordariaceae. Phylogenetic research in 2006 revealed that four genera in the family Coniochaetaceae, Coniochaeta, Coniochaetidium, Ephemeroascus, and Poroconiochaeta, were not monophyletic, and were all made synonymous with Coniochaeta.

== Genera incertae sedis ==
Includes unplaced genera;

- Cannonia J.E. Taylor & K.D. Hyde
- Pseudogliomastix W. Gams (1)
