= Chaetosphaeriales =

Scientific classification
- Domain: Eukaryota
- Kingdom: Fungi
- Division: Ascomycota
- Class: Sordariomycetes
- Subclass: Sordariomycetidae
- Order: Chaetosphaeriales; Huhndorf, A.N. Mill. & F.A. Fern.

Order of fungi

The Chaetosphaeriales are an order of fungi within the class Sordariomycetes.

== Families ==
As accepted by Wijayawardene et al. 2020 (with amount of genera per family);

- Chaetosphaeriaceae (52)
- Helminthosphaeriaceae (4)
- Leptosporellaceae (1)
- Linocarpaceae (3)

== Genera incertae sedis ==
Listed in 2020;

- Calvolachnella Marinc., T.A. Duong & M.J. Wingf. (1)
- Caudatispora J. Fröhl. & K.D. Hyde (2)
- Erythromada Huhndorf, A.N. Mill., F.A. Fernández & Lodge (1)
- Lasiosphaeriella Sivan. (6)
- Neoleptosporella Phukhams., Perera & K.D. Hyde (2)
- Neonawawia Jing Yang, K.D. Hyde & J.K. Liu (1)
- Rimaconus Huhndorf, F.A. Fernández, Joanne E. Taylor & K.D. Hyde (2)
