= Arcopilus aureus =

Scientific classification
- Kingdom: Fungi
- Division: Ascomycota
- Class: Sordariomycetes
- Order: Sordariales
- Family: Chaetomiaceae
- Genus: Arcopilus
- Species: A. aureus

Binomial name
- Arcopilus aureus X. Wei Wang & Samson (2016)

Synonyms
- Chaetomium aureum A.H. Chivers (1912); Chaetomium confusum Van Warmelo (1966); Chaetomium humicola Van Warmelo (1966); Chaetomium rubrogenum Van Warmelo (1966); Chaetomium trilaterale var. diporum J.C. Cooke (1973)

Species of fungus

Arcopilus aureus is a plant and soil fungus in the genus Arcopilus. It was first identified by A. H. Chivers in 1912, who named it Chaetomium aureum. It was later transferred to the genus Arcopilus by Wang and colleagues. The fungus has recently been recognized to have industrial use for the production of the metabolites resveratrol. and sclerotiorin Additionally, A. aureus has high lead tolerance and clearance, suggesting a potential role in environmental biotechnology.

== History and taxonomy ==
The genus Chaetomium first characterized in 1817 by Gustav Kunze based on the globular morphology of the perithecia. However, no comprehensive monograph of the species within Chaetomium was written following Kunze's initial publication. In 1912, A. H. Chivers identified Chaetomium aureum while attempting to classify Chaetomium specimens in his herbarium. Ch. aureum was transferred to the genus Arcopilus in 2016 based on phylogenetic analysis of DNA-dependent RNA polymerase II large subunits by X.W. Wang and R. A. Samson.

== Growth and morphology ==
Species within the genus Chaetomium are distinguished through morphological features. In general, the perithecium morphology of members of Chaetomium changes throughout maturation, changing from spherical and translucent, to globular or elongated and coloured when mature. Arcopilus aureus is morphologically similar to Chaetomium trilateral and Ch. fusiforme, leading to confusion in classification of species. However, the curvature of terminal hairs distinguish A. aureus from Ch. fusiforme, whereas spore discharge differentiates A. aureus from Ch. trilateral. Consistent with the perithecium morphology of the genus Chaetomium, the perithecia of A. aureus are flask-shaped, brown-black, and covered with long hairs. The terminal hairs (on the apex of the perithecium)' are olive-yellow, brown, or reddish-brown in colour, and curved at the tips. The lateral hairs (on the sides of the perithecium) are similarly olive-yellow in colour and uniform in diameter with less pronounced curvature at the tips. The growth rate of A. aureus is approximately 4-5mm per day. The mature ascomata are approximately 80-160μm in size, and maturation usually occurs within 10 days. Mature ascomata are olive-green and either spherical or oval-shaped. Ascomatal hairs are broad at the base, coiled at the tips, and can be either pale brown or yellow in colour. The asci are club-shaped with eight spores arranged either irregularly, or in two rows. Within the asci, young ascospores are translucent when young, but dark-green or brown when mature. Upon maturation, ascospores are boat, kidney, or lemon-shaped, with tapering and germ pores at both ends. A. aureus can be distinguished from similar species by its red, yellow and orange exudates producing colourful colonies in culture.

== Ecology ==
Species in the genus Chaetomium are common saprophytic plant pathogens involved in the decomposition of plant matter in soil, and cellulose-based man-made materials. Chaetomium species have been specifically recognized in the decay of cotton, and as the agent of fruit and wood rot. Arcopilus aureus was first identified from isolates growing on plant species collected in New England. Since its initial discovery, A. aureus appears to have a large geographic range, having been identified in Morocco, Brazil, and India. A. aureus has been isolated from paper and dung, as well as pineapple field soil, and snap bean seeds. Additionally, A. aureus endophytic to plant species, notably Vitis vinifera, and Thymelaea lythroides, a medicinal plant used in Moroccan traditional medicine for cancer treatment.

== Detection ==
Species within the genus Chaetomium are generally classified based on morphology of asci, ascospores, and terminal hairs. This however, leads to discrepancies in classification and determination of synonymous versus distinct species. For example, Dreyfuss (1976) considered Ch. aureum, Ch. trilaterale, Ch. fusiforme, Ch. cupreum, Ch. confusum, Ch. humicola, and Ch. rubrogenum to be a single species, whereas Ch. trilaterale was considered to be a distinct species by Millner et al. 1977. Molecular phylogenetic determination of fungi by means of protein electrophoresis has been reported, but with varying success. However, using isoelectric focusing in polyacrylamide gels to compare esterase enzymes in isolates of the Chaetomium species group, the number of esterase bands distinguishes Arcopilus aureus from its synonymous species. Although A. aureus is morphologically similar to Ch. trilaterale, protein electrophoresis shows the presence of two extra esterase bands in A. aureus. Additionally, protein electrophoresis shows that Ch. confusum, Ch. humicola, Ch. rubrogenum, and Ch. trilaterale are a synonymous species because of identical banding, supporting Dreyfuss's report in 1976.

== Therapeutics ==
Species in the genus Chaetomium are sources of many secondary metabolites with anti-malarial, anti-bacterial, and anti-cancer properties. Notably, Arcopilus aureus has been found to produce resveratrol, and sclerotiorin.

Resveratrol has many benefits effects on human health; it has been found to reduce the progression of neurological diseases such as dementia, and is used to treat cardiovascular problems and ischemic conditions. Isolates from the genera Aspergillus, Botryosphaeria, Penicillium, Fusarium, Alternaria, Arcopilus, and Lasiodiplodia that are endophytic to Vinis vinifera were all found to produce varying levels of resveratrol. Of these isolates, A. aureus was found to produce the highest levels of resveratrol, based on the Liebermann test to detect a free para position in phenolic compounds, the acetic anhydride test to confirm presence a free -OH group, and quantification of resveratrol by HPLC.

A. aureus isolates endophytic to Thymelaea lythroides were shown to have anti-cancer properties. Hsp90 chaperone machinery maintains stability of activated protein kinase and transcription factors that contribute to tumorigenesis. Thus, inhibition of Hsp90 leads to cellular degradation of target oncoproteins. Accordingly, inhibition of the Hsp90 chaperone machinery is a potential therapeutic target for cancer. A. aureus isolates were found to produce sclerotiorin, which was tested for its ability to inhibit the Hsp90 machinery by examining Hsp90-mediated folding of the progesterone receptor. In vitro reconstitution of progesterone receptor re-folding following heat stress showed that sclerotiorin inhibited recovery of the progesterone receptor. Additionally, the inhibitory function of sclerotiorin is dependent on the oxygen atom in the heterocycle, as inhibitory function was abolished in compounds containing nitrogen instead of oxygen.

== Environmental biotechnology ==
A potential usage of Arcopilus aureus in environmental biotechnology is bioremediation of soils contaminated with lead, organic matter, and abnormal pH levels. Previous studies have shown that species of the genus Chaetomium have been isolated from soils with high concentrations of metals, including lead. Additionally, growth of members of the genus Chaetomium are promoted by intermediate concentrations of lead. In agreement with early studies, A. aureus was isolated from soils with high lead concentration near a metallurgical plant in Brazil. Isolates of A. aureus shows high tolerance to lead nitrate and increased mycelial growth in the presence of metallic lead. Additionally, inoculation of the fungus in lead-contaminated soil showed a reduction in exchangeable lead concentration, in addition to maintenance of soil pH and establishment of organic matter in the presence of microbiota. The mechanism of lead reduction by A. aureus is unknown, but the two major hypotheses are: A. aureus produces oosporein, which creates a complex with lead, transforming it into insoluble pyromorphite.
