= Collariella bostrychodes =

Scientific classification
- Kingdom: Fungi
- Division: Ascomycota
- Class: Sordariomycetes
- Order: Sordariales
- Family: Chaetomiaceae
- Genus: Collariella
- Species: C. bostrychodes

Binomial name
- Collariella bostrychodes (Zopf) Wei Wang & Samson (2016)

Synonyms
- Chaetomium bostrychodes Zopf (1877)

Species of fungus

Collariella bostrychodes is a fungal decomposer of lignin and carbohydrate in the family Chaetomiaceae commonly found in soil and dung. The fungus is distinguished by a darkened collar-like ostiole around the ostiolar pore, giving the fungus its name. The fungus is highly variable in shape and form, giving raise to the belief that there are two subclades in the species. The ascospores range from lemon-shaped to nearly spherical with slightly pointed ends. It can grow to be pale green and later turn pale bluish grey or olivaceous with age. The fungus produces the toxic secondary metabolite, chaetochromin.

== History and taxonomy ==
In 1877, the fungus was originally described by Friedrich Wilhelm Zopf in the Verhandlungen des Botanischen Vereins der Provinz Brandenburg for the Botanischer Verein der Provinz Brandenburg. He described the fungus as part of the genus Chaetomium and initially being named as Chaetomium bostrychodes. C. bostrychodes was originally described to have ellipsoid ascomata by Pier Andrea Saccardo in 1882, but later in 1963, Ames re-examined and described the species to have subglobose to ovoid ascomata instead. The fungus was noted as being unable to produce functional antheridia, which suggested it wasn't part of the heterothallic species of Chaetomium. The fungus was described as unique in the genus Chaetomium for possessing banded spores that are characteristic of no species of Chaetomium described in 1937.

The fungus was believed to have two subclades designated C. bostrychodes and C. bostrychodes (A), which were considered to be macroscopically indistinguishable but closely related enough to each other that both subclades were kept as the same species. The two subclades were previously suggested both to be either aberrant physiological or nearly related forms. Using phylogenetic analyses, combined with morphological comparisons to related genera and species, Wang and Samson determined C. bostrychodes to have morphological diversity specific to indoor Chaetomiaceae that required creating a new genus. The genus, Collariella, was created to include for this diversity, its name refers to the dark collar-like apex that occurs around the ostiolar pore of the ascomata. C. bostrychodes was then transferred to the new genus and renamed Collariella bostrychodes, with the two subclades then grouped together and placed under this name.

== Morphology and phylogeny ==
Colonies of C. bostrychodes can grow 2.5 to 3.5 mm daily, usually without developing aerial mycelium. It can sometimes grow with pale green exudates and a green or uncoloured reverse. When young, C. bostrychodes appears as colourless and dextrinoid, but upon maturity, turns pale bluish grey or olivaceous with an apical germ pore . C. bostrychodes often are darkened around the 25 to 35 μm wide ostiolar pore, giving the genus its name of Collariella. Chaetomium convolutum can have a disposition to develop into some forms of C. bostrychodes, developing narrowly ellipsoidal or narrowly ovoidal perithecia restricted just below the darkened periostiolar collar. Similarly, C. bostrychodes appears similar morphologically to Collariella hilkhuijsenii, but C. bostrychodes can be distinguished via their larger ascospores and thicker terminal ascomatal hairs compared to those of C. hilkhuijsenii. The ascomatal walls are brown or ochraceous and composed of angular 5 to 12 μm cells. These tend to fracture underneath the terminal hairs, which then break away as a unit. Brown ascomatal hairs grow mainly from the apical disc, usually appearing as helically coiled in the apical region with little branching. The hairs are either verrucose or warty, which are about 4.5 to 6.5 μm thick with occasionally coiled branches. Lateral seta-like hairs are often also present and have tapered or clavate terminal ends with septate. These hairs break away at maturity with no aerial mycelium. C. bostrychodes develops perithecia late and possesses tightly coiled black terminal setae. The terminal hairs are branched, forming one spiral on another. The ascospores are considerably larger on average than those of C. robustum.

The asci are often surrounded by paraphyses-like, broad, evanescent filaments with a long, evanescent stalk that is 8 spored and 11 to 14 μm wide. The ascomata matures in 10 to 17 days, taking on a silvery appearance when young but then turns dark grey to black when mature. The apically flattened ascomata can be obovate, turbinate, ampulliform or cylindrical with its width ranging from 140 to 250 μm wide and ranging from 200 to 400 μm high. The fungus is recorded having touter, subglobose or ovoidal, ascomata but it is also recorded having slender, narrowly ellipsoid ascomata with 1 to 2 rows of textura prismatica. The breakdown of asci begins within the perithecia, and ascospores are later ejected in a slime consisting of the freed ascospores. The filaments grow upward and inward to exert pressure against each other to create a central cavity which asci push their way up. The asci deliquesce and then oozes out of the perithecial neck and are not violently discharged. C. bostrychodes fruits in the spring and early summer.

The two subclades are divided by phylogenetic and morphological evidence, but high statistical support was found to suggest they share a recent common ancestor and are closely related. The two subclades differ in setae, variability in length and color of terminal hairs, variety in ascospores' shape, with extreme variability between the two in the species. C. bostrychodes can vary in shape, such as possessing mostly ellipsoidal or broadly ellipsoid perithecia. However, both subclades have a specific banding of the spores that appears which is characteristic of C. bostrychodes only. There are differences on what the two subclades will reproduce on, with C. bostrychodes (A) being able to reproduce on asparagin and alcohol-glucose cultures, whereas C. bostrychodes can reproduce on blood fibrin, starch, phenol red, eosin methylene blue, and dextrine-FeClh instead. In C. bostrychodes (A), anastomoses of the terminal hairs are common, but not found in C. bostrychodes.

== Habitat and ecology ==
Collariella bostrychodes is considered a lignin, lignocellose, and carbohydrate decomposer but shows a significant preference for lignin, with a high frequency of occurrence in the fermentation layers of the forest. It can be isolated from soil, dung, decaying stems, roots, and seeds, but very rarely in woody materials. It has been isolated and found to be saprobic both in and on dung or excretions of dung of Oryctolagus cuniculu. C. bostrychodes is not limited to forest ecosystems. While not a marine fungi, it has been isolated in the ocean and sediments in the marine muds, which suggests that the fungus can be wind-carried. C. bostrychodes has been rarely isolated from food products, but it has been isolated in contaminated oat grains, okra, pea seeds and pepper. When C. bostrychodes is found in food products, it is typically a result of simple contamination.

== Health significance ==
A toxic pigment, chaetochromin, has now been proven to be widely associated with Chaetomium fungi., including C. bostrychodes. Oral and intraperitoneal administration of chaetochromin to mice may result in pronounced toxicity, which can lead to potential detrimental effects like selective inhibition of haematopoiesis. C. bostrychodes has been isolated from industrially polluted soils of the Kola Peninsula in ecosystems, specifically in ground cover and in areas of pine forests that have associations of moss shrubs and lichens shrubs, it believed to potentially cause diseases like Onychomycosis, skin infections, and peritonitis. However, such cases are rare and therefore not well studied.
