= Arcopilus =

Scientific classification
- Kingdom: Fungi
- Division: Ascomycota
- Class: Sordariomycetes
- Order: Sordariales
- Family: Chaetomiaceae
- Genus: Arcopilus; X. Wei Wang & Samson (2016)

Species
- Arcopilus aureus Arcopilus cupreus Arcopilus flavigenus Arcopilus fusiformis Arcopilus turgidopilosus

Genus of fungi

Arcopilus is a genus of plant and soil fungi. The genus was created in 2016 from several species formerly in the genus Chaetomium.
