= Botryotrichum piluliferum =

Scientific classification
- Domain: Eukaryota
- Kingdom: Fungi
- Division: Ascomycota
- Class: Sordariomycetes
- Order: Sordariales
- Family: Chaetomiaceae
- Genus: Botryotrichum
- Species: B. piluliferum

Binomial name
- Botryotrichum piluliferum Saccardo & Marchal (1885)

Synonyms
- Sepedonium xylogenum Sacc. (1882); Sepedonium niveum Massee & Salm. (1902); Coccospora agricola Goddard (1913); Botryotrichum keratinophilum Kushwaha & Agrawal (1976)

Species of fungus

Botryotrichum piluliferum is a fungal species first identified in 1885 by Saccardo and Marchal. It was discovered to be the asexual state of a member of the ascomycete genus, Chaetomium. The name B. piluliferum now applies to the fungus in all its states. B. piluliferum has been found worldwide in a wide range of habitats such as animal dung and vegetation. The colonies of this fungus start off white and grow rapidly to a brown colour. The conidia are smooth and white. B. piluliferum grows optimally at a temperature of 25–30 °C and a pH of 5.5.

== History and taxonomy ==
Botryotrichum piluliferum was first described in Belgium from rabbit dung. The anamorph was discovered by Pier Andrea Saccardo and Marchal in 1885. The teleomorph, Chaetomium piluliferum was named by J. Daniels in 1961 from a culture of B. piluliferum on cellulose film. The culture produced underdeveloped perithecia typical of those seen in the genus Chaetomium but was not connected to any known species at the time. The culture also produced phialospores and dark hyphae that were characteristic of B. piluliferum. Daniels described this as the teleomorph of B. piluliferum and named it C. piluliferum.

A dried type specimen of the teleomorph was studied and found to be similar to C. murorum, a species described by Corda in 1837. This fungus contained narrower ascospores, longer hairs of ascomata, and was absent of aleurioconidia and an anamorph. The conidiophores of C. piluliferum resemble that of C. piluliferoides which was discovered by Udagawa and Horie in 1975. C. piluliferoides produces aleurioconidia 5–7.5 μm in diameter and ascomata that are 200–240 x 120–145 μm containing short terminal hairs of 200–250 μm and spindle-shaped ascospores.

Hawksworth stated that understanding C. piluliferum could not be done using only the anamorph and expressed the need for further research on the Botryotrichum states which occur in three Farrowia and eight other Chaetomium species. C. piluliferum has the most complex conidiophores, (sub)hyaline aleurioconidia, and a thick wall. The others, such as B. atrogriseum, discovered by van Beyma in 1928 and B. peruvianum, discovered by Matsushima in 1975 have similar-sized aleurioconidia and are pigmented.

== Growth and morphology ==
The colonies of B. piluliferum are fast-growing. They can spread from 2.0 to 4.3 cm in diameter in one week when grown at 20 °C (68 °F). The colonies start off as white aerial mycelium which can become a yellowish-beige colour by the subsequent production of brown, rough-walled sterile setae. These brown setae are about 250 x 2–5 μm and bumpy or encrusted near their base. The conidiophores branch at right angles to the main axis. They are smooth, colourless, and produce conidia at their ends. The conidia are thick-walled, hyaline (white), smooth, and spherical. They are approximately 9–16 μm in diameter. B. piluliferum also contains branched hyaline conidiophores that produce aleurioconidia in clusters. The aleurioconidia are globose and typically 3.0–3.5 μm thick. The fungus can produce chains of phialoconidia as well. Ascomata in B. piluliferum are rare and reach maturity in four weeks at 25 °C (77 °F). They are black, with a globose to subglobose shape. The lateral and terminal hairs of the ascomata are 500–1500 μm long, 4–6 μm wide with an olive-brown colour and may contain tips with are rolled in a flat coil towards the center. The pale brown ascospores are ellipsoidal (or football-shaped) and contain one germ pore that is roughly 13–16 x 8–10.5 μm.

Mating behaviour of the fungus is unknown because single-spore cultures lose the ability to produce ascomata. The teleomorph C. piluliferum is made up of colonies containing brown hyphae with rough and bumpy hairs. C. piluliferum ascomata are superficial and spherical or obovate (oval-shaped with a narrow base, like a light bulb. They contain a small pore on the top called and ostiole that allow spores to pass through. The perithecia have brown or reddish walls and are covered with thick-walled, septate ascomatal hairs that are long, brown, with many bends and turns, often with tightly coiled tips. The asci are obovate (light bulb-shaped) or broadly clavate (baseball bat-shaped), have a short stalk and contain 8 spores. Phialoconidia form from the apex towards the base in the form of droplets on clustered flask-shaped cells.

== Physiology ==
Botryotrichum piluliferum has an optimal growth temperature range of 25–30 °C (77–86 °F), with its maximum growth temperature at 40 °C (104 °F). The fungus cannot tolerate acid. It can grow in alkaline pH greater than 8.8, however its optimal pH is 5.5. This allows for decomposition of starch, pectin and xylan. B. piluliferum produces mycotoxins that are metabolically similar to aflatoxin. A mycotoxin isolated from B. piluliferum, sterigmatocystin, is involved in the synthesis pathway of aflatoxin. In comparison to other species like Trichoderma aureoviride, that has been found to be very susceptible to parasites, B. piluliferum shows greater resistance to mycoparasites such as Pythium oligandrum. B. piluliferum also produces the metabolite cochliodinol A.

== Habitat and ecology ==
Botryotrichum piluliferum is found worldwide. It has been isolated and recorded in many countries such as Canada, the United States, The Netherlands, and South Africa. It has been found on deer and goat dung in Denmark and field mouse dung in England. The fungus is rarely found in soils, however, it can be found at depths of 80 cm below soil. It has been reported in mountainous regions, salt marshes, and cedar forests. It has also been isolated from stems of Urtica dioica, hay, rhizospheres of groundnut, rice and wheat, paper products, and mouldy textiles, as well as in the seeds of chili pepper. B. piluliferum is a food source for Pygmephorus mesembrinae and P. quadratus. When in vitro, it can be parasitized by Pythium oligandrum.
