= Pseudothielavia terricola =

Scientific classification
- Kingdom: Fungi
- Division: Ascomycota
- Class: Sordariomycetes
- Order: Sordariales
- Family: Chaetomiaceae
- Genus: Pseudothielavia
- Species: P. terricola

Binomial name
- Pseudothielavia terricola (J.C.Gilman & E.V.Abbott) X.Wei Wang & Houbraken (2019)

Synonyms
- Anixiopsis japonica K.Saito & K.Minoura (1948); Chaetomium terricola J.C. Gilman & E.V. Abbott (1971); Coniothyrium terricola J.C.Gilman & E.V.Abbott (1927); Thielavia terricola (J.C. Gilman & E.V. Abbott) C.W.Emmons (1930)

Species of fungus

Pseudothielavia terricola is a fungal species of the phylum Ascomycota, family Chaetomiaceae, and genus Pseudothielavia. Pseudothielavia terricola is widely distributed, especially in the tropical region of the world – with documented appearances in Africa, Southern Europe, and Asia. The species is mainly found in soil, but can also be found on other materials such as animal dung. The species was first assigned to the genus Coniothyrium in 1927, but was soon re-assigned to the genus Thielavia which endured for almost 90 years. Through intensive phylogenetic research and reassessment, the species was designated to a new genus, Pseudothielavia; the etymology of Pseudothielavia means similar to the genus Thielavia – the high resemblance was what contributed to the species assignment to the genus Thielavia nine decades ago. The fungus is mesophilic, grows abundantly in a pH level between 3.9–6, and is able to utilize multiple carbohydrates to support its growth. Mature Pseudothielavia terricola colonies in culture is dark brown in colour and spread out. Pseudothielavia terricola synthesizes a variety of compounds, two of which are thielavin A & B. These compounds were determined to be strong inhibitors of prostaglandin synthesis.

== History and taxonomy ==
The fungus was first isolated in culture and described by J.C.Gilman and E.V.Abbott of the Department of Dermatology of the College of Physicians and Surgeons of Columbia University from soil in 1927. The isolated culture was kept at the Dermatology department of the university under the label Coniothyrium terricola Gilman and Abbott, No. 172.2 The soil sample from which the fungi was isolated came from the American Type Culture Collection, with soil obtained from Iowa, USA. The species – first designated in the genus Coniothyrium – was soon determined to belong to the genus Thielavia by Chester Emmons in 1930. When the crushed culture mounts of the species were shown to B.O.Dodge of the New York Botanical Garden – who recognized the fungus as a species he isolated long time ago under the label 'Thielavia n.sp.' Emmons took the culture of Dodge, germinated the ascospores in new media, and compared it to culture no.1722. The two cultures displayed identical growth and morphological features, which contributed to the assignment of the genus Thielavia in 1930. In 2019, a study was published by Xincun Wang and his team at the Westerdijk Fungal Biodiversity Institute, which phylogenetically reassessed all members of the genus Thielavia through genetic sequencing. In the new study, the fungus Thielavia terricola was reassigned a new genus – Pseudothielavia. Currently, the name Pseudothielavia terricola holds the binomial authority of the fungi, while Coniothyrium terricola as well as Thielavia terricola are now considered as holotypes or synonyms of the species.

The genus Coniothyrium and Thielavia may have been assigned to Pseudothielavia terricola due to similar defining characteristics that highly resembles the fungus. Coniothyrium in the broad sense is defined to be unicellular with a smooth thin cell wall, pale-brown conidium, and a pycnidial structure with spherical cavity. Thielavia, on the other hand, is defined to have a non-ostiolate, spherical, setose ascomata, a brown thin cell wall, ellipsoidal to club-shaped asci, and unicellular, brown, single-germ pored ascospores. The defining characteristics of Coniothyrium coincides partially with Pseudothielavia terricola while defining characteristics of Thielavia fits Pseudothielavia terricola almost perfectly. However, following the recent phylogenetic re-assessment of the genus Thielavia, Wang and his team discovered that Pseudothielavia terricola, although morphologically similar to the genus Thielavia, should not be assigned to Thielavia sensu stricto due to genetic and subtle morphological differences. Thus, Wang and his team assigned a new genus – Pseudothielavia – to species that closely resembles the genus Thielavia but are genetically and morphologically distinct from that genus, which includes Pseudothielavia terricola.

== Growth and morphology ==
Pseudothielavia terricola is a mesophilic fungus, with an optimal growth temperature of 37°C, a minimum growing temperature of 15 °C and a maximal growth temperature of 46 °C. Acidity and basicity also contribute greatly to the proper growth of the species; the fungus grows best in a pH range between 3.9–6, and terminates growth in environment with a pH higher than 7.9 or lower than 2.9. As for nutrition, the species is capable of breaking down various types of carbohydrates – such as chitin, cellulose, and poly-/tri-/di-/monosaccharides, alcohol, nitrate, ammonium, and nitrogen-containing compounds to support its growth.

Mophologically, colonies grown on corn meal agar, malt extract agar, and oatmeal agar at 28 °C display a well spread out uniform white mat in 14 days. The colour of the colonies then darkens as time goes on, changing from white to brown to black – the color at maturity. The black color is largely due to the dark-coloured spores that form as the fungi matures. The ascomata of the fungi are submerged spherical cleistothecia, dark brown in color and is usually 60–200 μm in diameter. The ascomata of the fungi is encased with a brown, semi-transparent, pseudoparenchymatous, double membraned textura epidermoidea – thin and tightly packed peridium. The peridium is also smooth walled and not bristly. Inside the ascomata, the shape of the spore bearing asci of the fungi can range from pyriform to ovate to clavate to ellipsoidal. The asci of the fungi are also always eight-spored, and evanescent (disintegrating), varying in size from 24x14 μm to 40–20 μm. The ascospores of the fungi are unicellular, brown-dark green in colour, and ellipsoidal. The ascospores of the fungi are also observed to only have germ pores at one end, with the other end being truncated. The dimension of the ascospores range from 9x5 – 16x9 μm. The species present no anamorphic or asexual form.

== Physiology ==
In addition to the species' ability to metabolize various carbohydrates and other chemical compounds for its growth, Pseudothielavia terricola also produce bioactive compounds that possess clinical research value. Thielavin A (C_{31}H34O10)and B (C_{29}H30O10) are two compounds that were isolated from Pseudothielavia terricola culture. These two compounds were shown to be structurally similar to depsides – which consists of three hydroxybenzoic acid groups. The melting point for the two compound was determined to be 235–236 °C and 250 °C respectively. They are insoluble in water but soluble in multiple organic solvents including methanol, ethanol, acetone, chloroform, and pyridine. In a study published in 1981, thielavin A and B were demonstrated to be novel inhibitors of prostaglandin synthesis, targeting arachidonic acid – prostaglandin H2 conversion and prostaglandin H2-prostaglandin E2 conversion respectively. Overproduction of prostaglandin in the human body has been linked to body pain, fever, inflammation and diarrhea, painful menstruation, arthritis, even certain forms of cancer.

== Habitat and ecology ==
The fungus is a cosmopolitan species and is mainly found in soil, fecal matter, plant seeds, and roots of decaying plant. The distribution of the species is noted to concentrate along tropical regions, with documented appearances in multiple parts of Africa (such as Sudan, Sierra Leone, and Nigeria), Kuwait, Pakistan, India, Nepal, New Guinea, Japan and others. Distribution in regions distant from the tropics are also present, countries such as the Netherlands, Britain, and the United States also have been reported to show the presence of this species. In terms of habitat, the fungus has been reported to grow on a variety of soils. To list a few, the species have been found in forest soils, grassland, grass plots with Dichanthium annulatum, rice fields, and saline soil. In addition, the species has been isolated from other miscellaneous material of plant and animal origin. The species has been found on materials such as decaying strawberry plant, decaying Cordia dichotoma fruit, barley, seeds of wheat and groundnuts, cotton, kernels of Arachis hypogaea, and the dung of various animals (monkey, sheep, cow, elephant).
