= Chaetomium grande =

Scientific classification
- Domain: Eukaryota
- Kingdom: Fungi
- Division: Ascomycota
- Class: Sordariomycetes
- Order: Sordariales
- Family: Chaetomiaceae
- Genus: Chaetomium
- Species: C. grande

Binomial name
- Chaetomium grande Asgari & Zare

Species of fungus

Chaetomium grande is a fungus species in the Chaetomium genus, first isolated from Iran. It shares features such as peridium structure, ascospore morphology and germ pore position with its cogenerates. It is closely related to C. megalocarpum.
