= Chaetomium iranianum =

Scientific classification
- Domain: Eukaryota
- Kingdom: Fungi
- Division: Ascomycota
- Class: Sordariomycetes
- Order: Sordariales
- Family: Chaetomiaceae
- Genus: Chaetomium
- Species: C. iranianum

Binomial name
- Chaetomium iranianum Asgari & Zare

Species of fungus

Chaetomium iranianum is a fungus species in the Chaetomium genus, first isolated from Iran. It shares features such as peridium structure, ascospore morphology and germ pore position with its cogenerates. This species in particular can be characterized by spirally coiled ascomatal hairs and fusiform ascospores.
