= Chaetomium truncatulum =

Scientific classification
- Domain: Eukaryota
- Kingdom: Fungi
- Division: Ascomycota
- Class: Sordariomycetes
- Order: Sordariales
- Family: Chaetomiaceae
- Genus: Chaetomium
- Species: C. truncatulum

Binomial name
- Chaetomium truncatulum Asgari & Zare

Species of fungus

Chaetomium truncatulum is a fungus species in the Chaetomium genus, first isolated from Iran. It shares features such as peridium structure, ascospore morphology and germ pore position with its cogenerates. This species in particular can be characterized by spirally coiled ascomatal hairs and fusiform ascospores.
