= Chaetomium interruptum =

Scientific classification
- Domain: Eukaryota
- Kingdom: Fungi
- Division: Ascomycota
- Class: Sordariomycetes
- Order: Sordariales
- Family: Chaetomiaceae
- Genus: Chaetomium
- Species: C. interruptum

Binomial name
- Chaetomium interruptum Asgari & Zare

Species of fungus

Chaetomium interruptum is a fungus species in the Chaetomium genus, first isolated from Iran. It shares features such as peridium structure, ascospore morphology and germ pore position with its cogenerates. It is closely related to C. megalocarpum.
