= Farrowia =

Scientific classification
- Kingdom: Fungi
- Division: Ascomycota
- Class: Sordariomycetes
- Order: Sordariales
- Family: Chaetomiaceae
- Genus: Farrowia; D. Hawksw.

Genus of fungi

Farrowia is a genus of fungi within the Chaetomiaceae family.

== Taxonomy ==
In 1975, Hawksworth suggested a novel genus for F. seminuda, F. longicola, and F. malaysiensis. These species were distinguished from other Chaetomium species by their long-necked ascomata and production of anamorphs similar to Botryotrichum. However, this categorization has been controversial since its inception. In 2001, a molecular phylogenetic study using rRNA sequence data did not support the separation of Farrowia and Chaetomium.

Widden, in 1986, suggested that Farrowia seminuda and Botryotrichum piluliferum are the teleomorph and anamorph of the same organism based on their preference for coniferous soils and visual indistinguishability.

== Description ==
Perithecia are subglobose (imperfectly spherical), with straight, unbranched lateral and terminal hairs. The terminal hairs fuse to form a neck-like structure, potentially rudimentary. Pedestal-like rhizoidal bases are usually present. Farrowia forms asci which are clavate (club-shaped) and deliquesce before ascospores mature. The ascospores are limoniform (lemon-shaped), biapiculate, and are not ornamented. F. malaysiensiensis is reported having a longer neck than the other two species in this genus.

In media cultures, reddish brown pigments are produced only in the presence of contaminants.

== Ecology ==
Species are widespread across tropical and temperate areas. It is most commonly found in soil, although F. longicola has been found in leaf litter and freshwater.

== Chemistry and Research ==
Novel interleukin inhibitors were isolated from Farrowia broths in 2003. These compounds were named EI-1941-1 and EI-1941-2. The enzymes they specifically inhibit are elastase and cathepsin B. EI-1941-2 is degraded by the presence of cysteine, but EI-1941-1 is not. Further study of these ICE inhibitors could lead to new synthetic anti-inflammatory agents.
