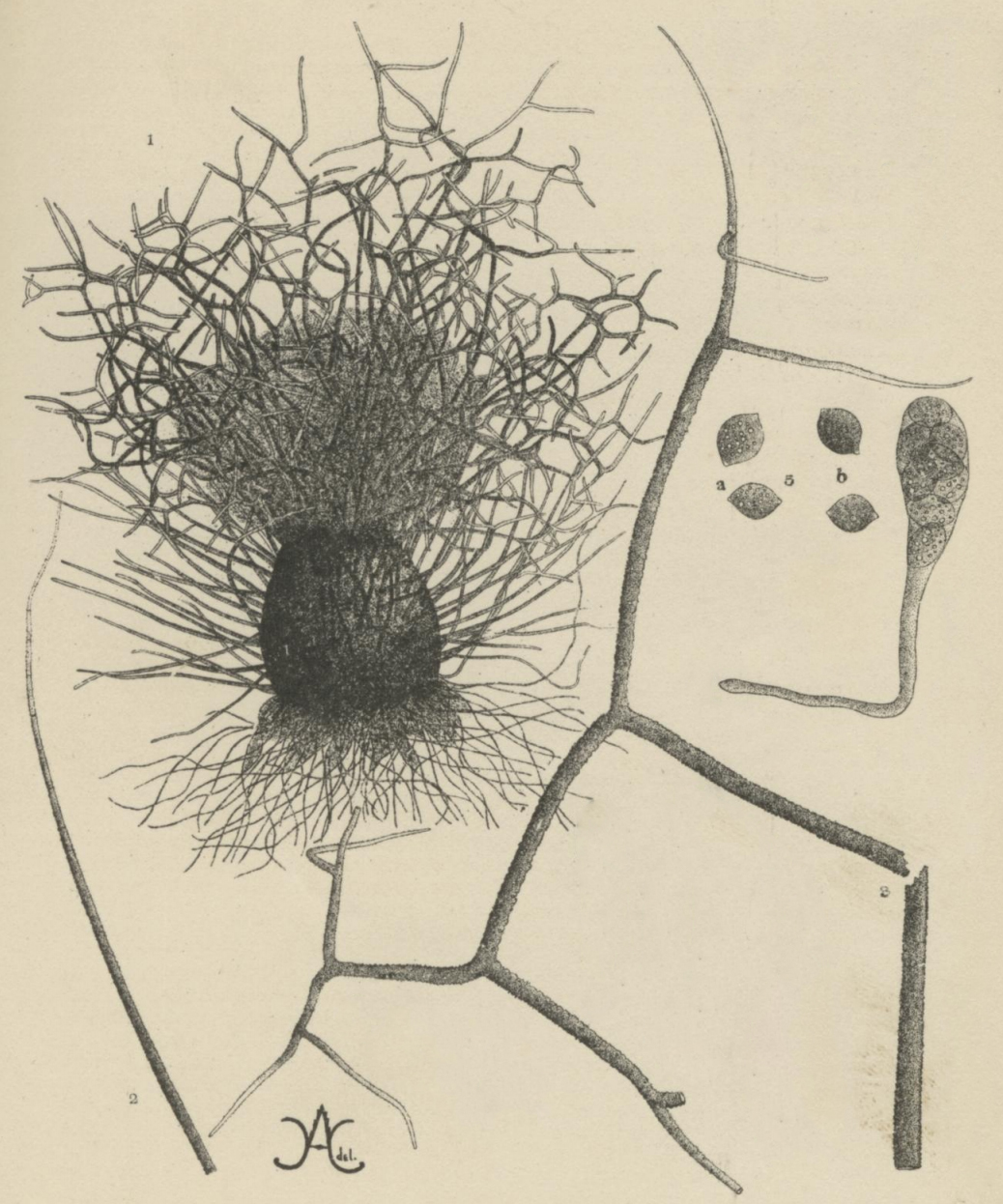

Scientific classification
- Kingdom: Fungi
- Division: Ascomycota
- Class: Sordariomycetes
- Order: Sordariales
- Family: Chaetomiaceae
- Genus: Chaetomium
- Species: C. elatum

Binomial name
- Chaetomium elatum Kunze (1818)

Synonyms
- Chaetomium tenuissimum Sergeeva (1960); Chaetomium virgicephalum Ames (1963); Chaetomium virgecephalum Ames (1963); Chaetomium ramipilosum Schaumann (1973); Chaetomium lageniforme Corda (1837); Chaetomium pannosum Wallroth (1833); Chaetomium comatum (Tode) Fries (1829); Chaetomium atrum Link (1824); Sphaeria scopula Sowerby (1803); Sphaeria comata Tode (1791)

= Chaetomium elatum =

Species of fungus

Chaetomium elatum is a very common and widely distributed saprotrophic fungus of the Chaetomiaceae family of molds which has been found to grow on many different substances all over the world. It was first established by Gustav Kunze after he observed it growing on dead leaves. Its defining features that distinguish it from other Chaetomium species are its extremely coarse terminal hairs and the lemon-shaped morphology of its ascospores. It produces many metabolites with potential biotechnology uses including one with promise against the rice blast disease fungus, Magnaporthe grisea. It shows very little pathogenic ability causing confirmed disease in only a few plant species.

== History and taxonomy ==
Gustav Kunze established the genus Chaetomium in 1817 after discovering a new species of fungus in dead stalks and leaves which he named C. globosum. In 1818, when observing the dead leaves of Typha and Sparganium in Germany, Kunze recognized a new fungus that looked like C. globosum but was darker in pigmentation, and after characterizing it named it Ch. elatum. In addition to Kunze's identification and characterization of the species (in which he failed to discern asci), Robert Greville created illustrations in 1826 to show the morphology of the species. Despite this, C. elatum has been confused by other mycologists many times and thus has been re-described more than any other Chaetomium species, leading to many obligate synonyms. It was during the creation of one of these synonyms, C. lageniforme, by August Corda in 1837 that asci were first recognized, thus identifying the defining feature that placed this fungus in the fungal division, Ascomycota.

== Growth and morphology ==
Chaetomium elatum produces darkly-coloured oval perithecia covered with stiff, black hairs. The perithecia are typically attached firmly to the substratum by dark/black rhizoids. In laboratory colonies C. elatum generally grows 5–6 mm per day, but can show different growth rates and colour characteristics depending on the growth medium. Under certain growth conditions, colonies of some strains of C. elatum may develop coloured guttation droplets of liquid on their surfaces whose function and composition are unknown. C. elatum has a homothallic mating system.

The perithecia are superficial, usually mature in 13 to 20 days, and are 280–440 μm high with a diameter of 255–380 μm. They may appear greenish in color under reflected light with a round/oval-like shape and have an ostiole that is sparsely covered in white/buff aerial hyphae. The perithecial wall is made of brown interwoven hyphae or tightly packed pseudoparenchyma. Morphology of the black/dark perithecium hairs varies depending on their location. Terminal hairs are extremely coarse, branched at right to straight angles, have irregular projections, blunt spines, and dwindle off to thin translucent tips. Lateral hairs are thin, long, unbranched, coarsely roughened by irregular projections and dwindle into translucent smooth tips that are vaguely separate. The difference between the terminal hair of C. elatum and C. globosum is a distinguishing factor between the two taxa.

The asci of C. elatum are generally club-shaped and contain 8 round ascospores. The ascospores are translucent/light olive when young and become brown with pointed tips when they mature giving them lemon-like shape when viewed in profile. The ascospores also have a thick wall with a small pore on the outer wall of their apex. Morphology of the ascospores is a distinguishing factor when compared to other Chaetomium species with which it might be confused like C. indicum, C. funicolum, and C. virgecephalum.

The asexual morph of C. elatum has acremonium-like growth, with its conidia being borne on phialidic conidiophogeous cells that form on aerial aseptate hyphae and are 6–24.5 μm long with a diameter of 1.5–3.5 μm at the base. Conidium dimensions are 2.5–5.5 μm × 1.5–2.5 μm and they form towards the base of the conidiophore in chains, are translucent, smooth, and oval-shaped with a rounded apex and short base. rhizo

== Habitat and ecology ==
Chaetomium elatum is a very common and widely distributed species of Chaetomium, with it being found all over the world. The species has been found in many areas of the United States, Canada, England, France, Russia, Switzerland, Germany, Scotland, the Galapagos Islands and many other localities.

It is the most common species of fungi that grows on damp rotting straw, but has also been found and isolated from a variety of materials like rope, burlap, wood, paper, cellulose products, animal dung, seeds, barrel hoops, old brooms, Hordeum vulgare L, Triticum aestivum and the dead leaves of Typha and Sparganium. In general this species of Chaetomium mainly colonizes cereal, Alkali seepweed, True grasses, has been found to interact with Japanese yew, Alkali seepweed, European rabbit, Bread wheat, True grasses, Corn. It has also been associated with the mycobiota of Sugarcane as well as is known as a root-colonizing fungus in the avocado plant where it serves as both a rhizoplane and rhizosphere.

== Biotechnology uses ==
Chaetomium elatum has been isolated from different materials and its metabolic properties with potential biotechnology uses have been explored. In the presence of nitrocellulose (a very important cellulose derivative).C. elatum can break down nitrocellulose in liquid culture. Investigations into the types of metabolites produced by this fungus have found that it produces benzoquinone derivatives, tetra-S-methyl derivatives, anthraquinone-chromanone, orsellinic acid, globosumones, sterols Chaetoglobsins, Cochliodones 1–3 (azaphilone derivatives), azaphilones, chlorinated phenolic glycosides, and xanthoquinodins. Xanthoquinodins are fungal metabolites that have been found to have antibacterial, antifungal, anticoccidial, antiplasmodial, and cytotoxic activities. Azaphilones have antimicrobial, antifungal, antiviral, antioxidant, cytotoxic, nematicidal and anti-inflammatory properties, and the three metabolized by C. elatum have also been found to inhibit Caspase 3 which is involved in cell death. Phenolic compounds have shown to possess antimicrobial properties. Chaetoglobosins has been found to have anticancer activity, and benzoquinone derivatives have antibacterial properties. Nanoparticles harvested from crude extracts of the C. elatum exhibit antimicrobial activity against Magnaporthe grisea, the plant pathogen that causes rice blast disease.

== Plant pathogenicity ==
Chaetomium elatum is a known pathogen of the common grape vine. In 2007, an investigation to determine its pathogenicity on avocado plants found that it opportunistically colonizes the plant roots and only becomes pathogenic when resources are very limited and intraspecific competition is high.
