= Carex planostachys =

Scientific classification
- Kingdom: Plantae
- Clade: Tracheophytes
- Clade: Angiosperms
- Clade: Monocots
- Clade: Commelinids
- Order: Poales
- Family: Cyperaceae
- Genus: Carex
- Species: C. planostachys

Binomial name
- Carex planostachys Kunze

Synonyms
- Carex halleriana subsp. planostachys (Kunze) Kük.

Species of plant

Carex planostachys, the cedar sedge, is a species of flowering plant in the family Cyperaceae, native to the U.S. states of New Mexico, Texas, Oklahoma and Arkansas, all of Mexico, and Guatemala. A small species reaching 15 cm (6 in), it is usually found growing in the duff under "cedars" (junipers).
