= Chaetomium perlucidum =

Scientific classification
- Kingdom: Fungi
- Division: Ascomycota
- Class: Sordariomycetes
- Order: Sordariales
- Family: Chaetomiaceae
- Genus: Chaetomium
- Species: C. perlucidum

Binomial name
- Chaetomium perlucidum Sergeeva (1956)

Synonyms
- Chaetomium perlucidum Sergeeva; Chaetomium perlucidum Sergeeva 1956; Chatomium perlucidum

Species of fungus

Chaetomium perlucidum is a neurotropic dematiaceous (melanated cell wall) fungus that is naturally found in the soil, including in agricultural soil, and in the stems of dead plants. The fungus can also be found on the feathers of birds, manure, seeds, and even paper. It is able to thrive at temperatures of 35 and 42 °C (95 and 108 °F).

The fungus is an invasive opportunist to humans that can cause diseases such as onychomycosis (fungus on nails), otolaryngologic (head and neck) or respiratory inflammations (like sinusitis, pneumonia, and empyema), and brain necrosis.

== History ==
It was first formally recorded in 1956 in Ukraine by K. S. Sergeeva.

== Morphology ==
Chaetomium perlucidum is pigmented and dark in colour, appearing hairy and wooly, with a growth rate of 4-5 mm/day.

=== Perithecia (fruiting body) ===
Chaetomium perlucidum's fruiting bodies become fully mature in 13-16 days. The fruiting body's structural width is 90-200 μm, with an ostiolar pore (open pore) width of 30-50 μm.

=== Setae (bristle / "hair" structures) ===
Setae width is 2-3 μm and can have lengths of up to 700 μm. The setae are unbranched and appear to undulate.

=== Mature ascospores ===
Fully mature ascospores are 12.5-14 μm x 6-7.5 μm in size. They are smooth, oval-shaped, and brown in colour.

=== Lipid / fatty acid composition ===
Chaetomium perlucidum is composed of saturated, monounsaturated, and polyunsaturated fatty acids.

C. perlucidum fatty acid content
Fatty acid	Amount (%)
Pentadecylic acid / pentadecanoic acid (15:0, CH_{3}(CH_{2})_{13}COOH)	0.42 ± 0.33
Palmitic acid / hexadecanoic acid (16:0, C_{16}H_{32}O_{2})	18.95 ± 0.92
Palmitoleic acid (16:1, C_{16}H_{30}O_{2})	trace amounts
Stearic acid / octadecanoic acid (18:0, C_{18}H_{36}O_{2})	6.76 ± 0.45
Oleic acid (18:1, CH_{3}(CH_{2})_{7}CH=CH(CH_{2})_{7}COOH)	7.38 ± 5.79
Linoleic acid (18:2, C_{18}H_{32}O_{2})	63.48 ± 3.71

== Pathogenicity ==
The fungus can cause chronic fungal infections in humans. An infection can spread throughout the body from a single point of infection into various other systems, e.g., the central nervous, cardiovascular, respiratory, and immune systems, with especially a low prognosis for cerebral infections.

=== Mode of transmission and infection ===
Infections take hold in the brain and progress to spread throughout the body. Pathways of entry into the host's body include via cutaneous lesions, oral intake, or intravenously.

=== Susceptibility ===
There have been at least two reported cases of cerebral phaeohyphomycosis in humans with one case resulting in death, reported in 2003. Both cases occurred in immunosuppressed individuals already suffering from complications of other unrelated diseases. Recreational drug users, or patients who have undergone intravenous or transplant procedures at even hospitals are also susceptible to being infected by C. perlucidum.

=== Treatment and prognosis ===
Most Chaetomium fungal diseases are without known cure and in one case of death from 1996, antifungal therapy through administering Amphotericin B (AMB) proved ineffective. AMB is a common and leading antibiotic treatment prescribed for fungal infections. In one case, C. perlucidum infection in the brain caused death from hemorrhaging throughout the body (especially in the brain) and complications that arose from acute inflammation. However, the physical removal of a C. perlucidum growth through a lobectomy (surgically removing the fungal growth from an area of affected organ/s) was successful in curing another patient from infection.

== Culturing techniques ==
Chaetomium perlucidum ascospores can be cultured and grown in the lab through incubation on potato flake agar at 25°C for 6-10 days. Optimal growth temperature however is at 37°C. Mature perithecia can be obtained if the fungus has access to a sterile plant source.

== Occurrence in farming soil ==
Chaetomium perlucidum was found more frequently in tilled than in untilled farmland.
