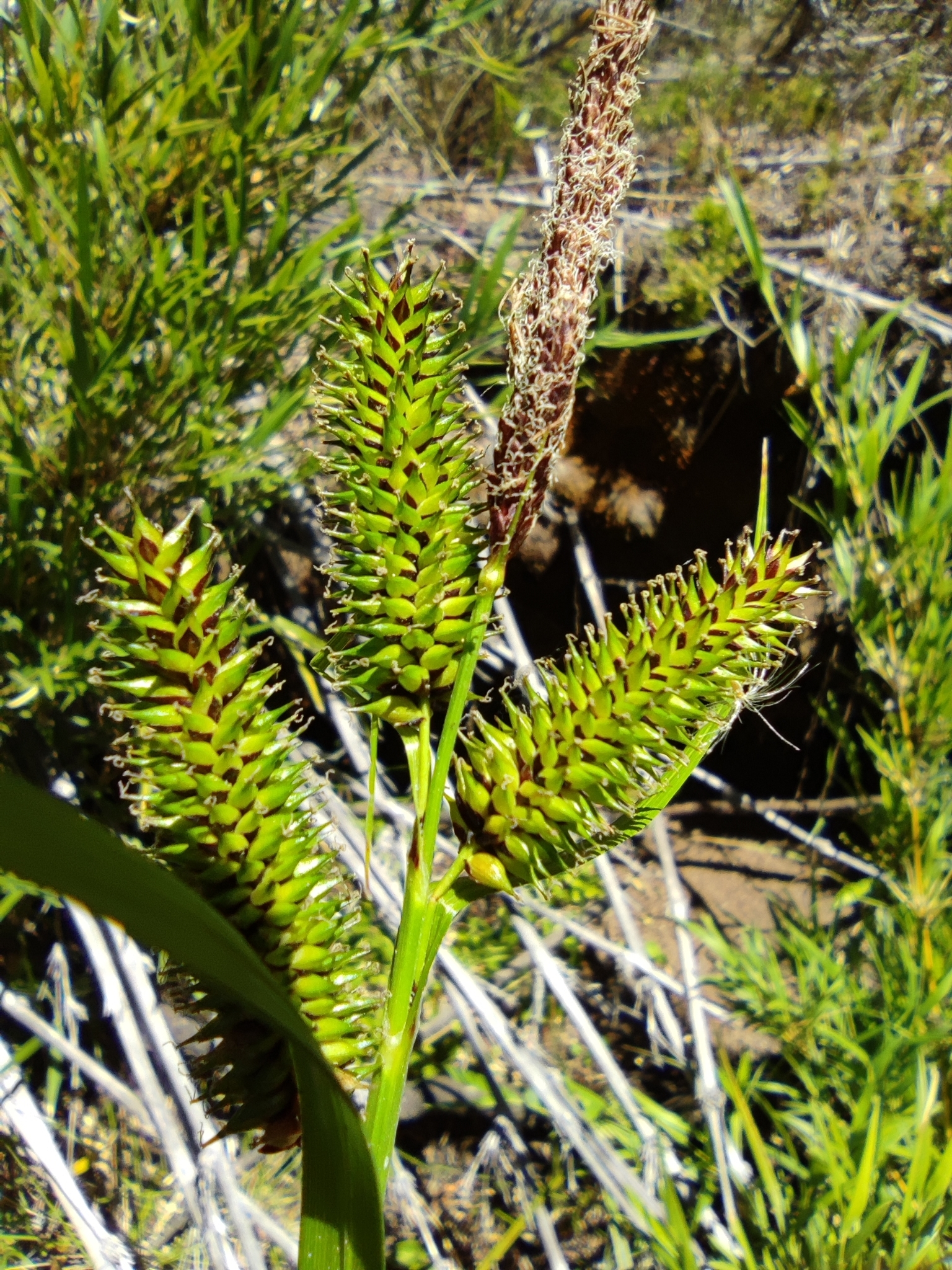

Scientific classification
- Kingdom: Plantae
- Clade: Tracheophytes
- Clade: Angiosperms
- Clade: Monocots
- Clade: Commelinids
- Order: Poales
- Family: Cyperaceae
- Genus: Carex
- Species: C. multispicata

Binomial name
- Carex multispicata Kunze

Synonyms
- Carex acutata var. multispicata (Kunze) Kük.

= Carex multispicata =

Species of plant

Carex multispicata is a species of flowering plant in the sedge family Cyperaceae. It is native to northwest Argentina and the central and southern regions of Chile.
