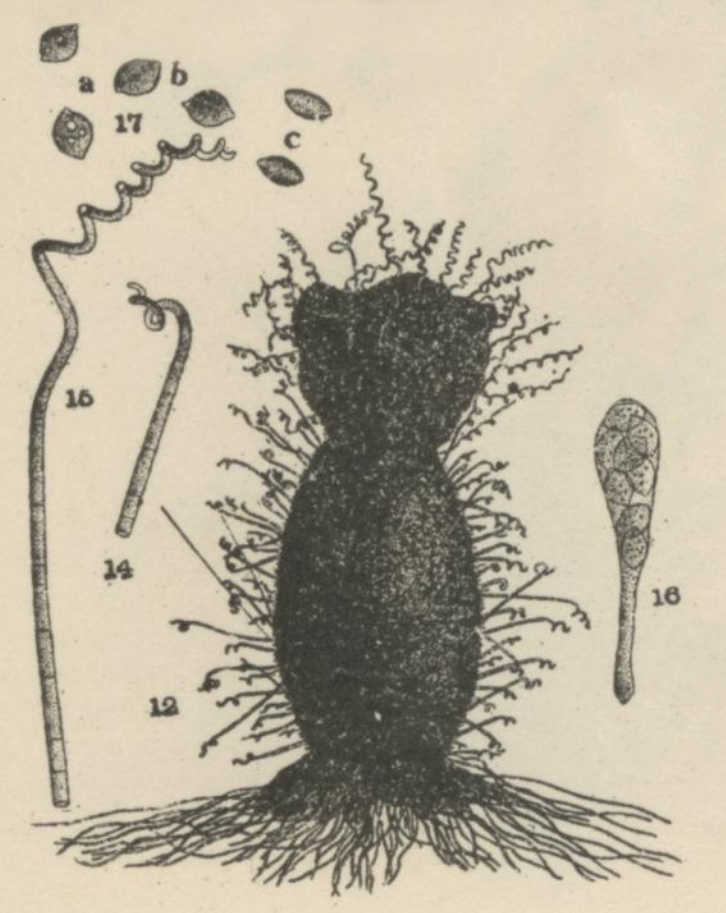

Scientific classification
- Kingdom: Fungi
- Division: Ascomycota
- Class: Sordariomycetes
- Order: Sordariales
- Family: Chaetomiaceae
- Genus: Chaetomium
- Species: C. subspirale

Binomial name
- Chaetomium subspirale A.H. Chivers, (1912)

Synonyms
- Humicola subspiralis (Chivers) X. Wei Wang & Houbraken (2019)

= Chaetomium subspirale =

Species of fungus

Chaetomium subspirale is a fungus from the phylum Ascomycota. It was described by A. H. Chivers in 1912 in America. The species has sexual fruiting bodies that are ornamented with characteristic, coiled hairs giving it a wooly appearance. C. subspirale colonies are brown, which the characteristic hairs are also responsible for. It is commonly found in various soil and dung samples. C. subspirale produces the mycotoxin, oxaspirodion, which inhibits inducible TNF-a expression and inhibits the activation of the transcription factor NF-kappaB.

== History and taxonomy ==
Professor A.H. Chivers recognized Chaetomium subspirale in 1912 in America through the course of his work on the genus Chaetomium. Through the examination of many successive generations and the cultivation of species from different sources on various media, Chivers was able to examine a large series of specimens from various herbaria and exsiccati. This examination allowed Chivers to provide his preliminary diagnosis of C. subspirale along with a number of other species within Chaetomium. X.W. Wang conducted a phylogenetic analysis of C. subspirale. Wang's findings have led her to propose the transfer of C. subspirale to the genus Humicola as H. subspiralis. MycoBank lists this new bionomial name as a synonym for C. subspirale.

== Growth and morphology ==
Chaetomium subspirale has been recognized for having a daily growth rate of 2.5-3.5 μm for colonies. Canadian mycologist Dr. Adrian Carter observed a moderately fast growth rate of 3.0-3.5 mm/day in Czapek's medium and Leonian's medium and a growth rate of 3.0-4.0 mm/day for the tomato paste and oatmeal-based medium, Weitzman & Silvia-Hunter's agar.

Characteristic hair help to distinguish C. subspirale. The lateral hairs are short, straight and dark, with tightly coiled tips. The terminal slender is initially delicately coiled in a spiral and then elongated and twisted later. This gives the appearance of wool threads to the fungi. In comparison, the ascogonial coil are short, stipitate and irregularly coiled. Colonies of C. subspirale have an appearance of brown due to the erect, verrucose mycelial hairs. The ascomata, which are usually 200-280 μm, take 14 days to mature. In reflected light, they give a grey appearance with a brown wall of flattened, angular (7-12 μm) cells. With a brown and distinctly septate broad base of 2.5-3.5 μm, C. subspirale also has well-developed rhizoids, which can be up to 400 μm in length. C. subspirale's barrel shaped perithecia help to distinguish it from other species of Chaetomium.

=== Similar taxa ===
Chaetomium subspirale is similar to various other species in the genus Chaetomium. However it is possible to distinguish between the species due to differentiating characteristics. A few species that C. subspirale is similar to include C. homopilatum, C. ampullare, C. sphaerale, C. pulchellum, and C. semispirale. C. subspirale has smaller ascomata with a conical beak and larger ascospores than C. homopilatum. C. ampullare and C. sphaerale are easily distinguished from C. subspirale due to the larger ascospores and ascomata of C. subspirale. C. pluchellum morphologically resembles C. subspirale, however, C. pluchellum has more slender terminal perithecial hairs. Different ascospore sizes and colony morphology on Leonian's and Czapek's media help to differentiate C. subspirale from C. semispirale.

== Habitat ==
Chivers states that C. subspirale is commonly found in various soil and dung samples. In terms of soil, C. subspirale has been found in cultures of various substrata from New England frequently. For dung samples, C. subspirale appears in various locations and various types of dung samples. In Ontario, Canada, it has been observed on paper and rabbit, cow and deer dung. In the US, C. subspirale has appeared on the dung of sheep, dog, good, deer and rabbit. In South America, it has been reported from chicken dung, while in the Isles of Shoals, it has been recorded to appear rat dung. It is also found on dung in The Netherlands and South America. Chivers identified C. subspirale on antelope dung in Kenya as well.

== Industrial use ==
Significant research has revealed a large number of natural products derived from fungi that have potential for anti-inflammatory and anticancer properties for human cancer cells. Some compounds have even been tested in mouse models of human cancer to demonstrate their therapeutic benefits. Oxaspiradion is one of the fungi-derived natural products with an ability to aid in anti-inflammatory and anticancer measures. Isolated from C. subspirale, oxaspirodion inhibits inducible TNF-an expression and inhibits the activation of the transcription factor NF-kappaB.

Inflammatory diseases, such as, septic shock, rheumatoid arthritis and Crohn's disease, involve TNF-a as the main pro-inflammatory cytokine. Some new therapeutic approaches target the regulation of TNF-an expression. Rether et al. used a cell-based screening system to identify a low molecular weight compounds inhibitory to the induction of TNF-an expression from a large panel of mycelial cultures of basidiomycetes, ascomycetes. Rether et al. found that oxaspirodion derived from C. subspirale inhibited the expression of a TNF-a-driven luciferase reporter gene. The NF-kappaB pathway is considered a prototypical proinflammatory signaling pathway. Oxaspirodion inhibits the activation of the transcription factor NF-kappaB, leading to interest in its potential as an anticancer therapeutic.
