= Chaetomium thermophilum =

Scientific classification
- Domain: Eukaryota
- Kingdom: Fungi
- Division: Ascomycota
- Class: Sordariomycetes
- Order: Sordariales
- Family: Chaetomiaceae
- Genus: Chaetomium
- Species: C. thermophilum

Binomial name
- Chaetomium thermophilum La Touche (1950)

Species of fungus

Chaetomium thermophilum is a thermophilic filamentous fungus. It grows on dung or compost (rotten organics). It is notable for being a eukaryote with a high temperature tolerance (60 °C). Its optimal growth temperature is 50–55 °C.

== Research ==
Since fungi are eukaryotic and not distant from animals they are good models for comparative and easy-to-manipulate research, and in the case of C. thermophilum, it is of special significance. First, given the fact it is thermophilic, proteins derived from this fungus are heat stable and thus easier to work with. Proteins from C. thermophilum are thermophilic and thus better for studies (structural and biochemical) than comparable mesophilic fungi. Studying nuclear pore complex proteins, it was found that protein isolation was more abundant and more soluble than in yeast (yeast proteins precipitate at a lower temperature).

== Genome and proteome ==
The genome of C. thermophilum has been completely sequenced. It spans 28.3 Mb and encodes 7227 predicted protein coding genes. Saccharomyces cerevisiae, a model yeast, has 73% protein homology to this fungus.

The proteome of C. thermophilum has been studied and 27 distinct protein communities, including 108 interconnected complexes have been identified.

== Model system for identifying higher-order protein interactions ==
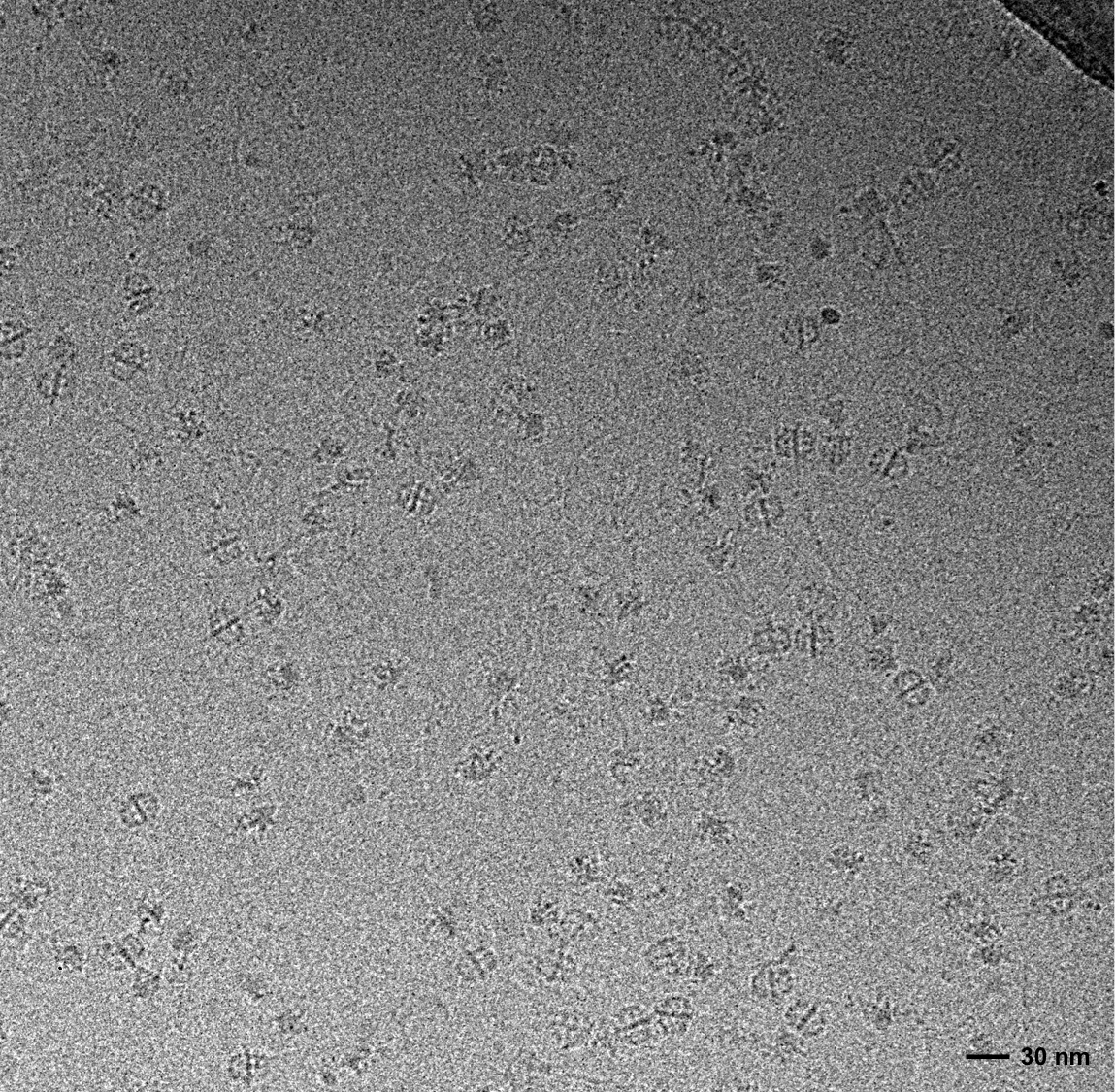
Cryo-electron microscopic image of fractionated lysate from C. thermophilum cellular extracts. Megadalton protein complexes are observed (e.g. the barrel-shaped fatty acid synthase) that are either co-eluting or interacting to form higher-order protein complex assemblies (communities).

The first observation of a metabolon in fatty acid metabolism at high resolution came from cryo-electron microscopic analysis of cellular homogenates from C. thermophilum. Other protein complexes and higher-order interactions were predicted and validated using a novel integration of experimental and computational methods which include proteomics, cross-linking mass spectrometry, computational structural biology and electron microscopy. The cellular homogenates of C. thermophilum were used to derive protein complex structures at high resolution, with purity of the native protein complex < 40%.
