= Thielavia =

Scientific classification
- Kingdom: Fungi
- Division: Ascomycota
- Class: Sordariomycetes
- Order: Sordariales
- Family: Chaetomiaceae
- Genus: Thielavia; Zopf (1876)

Type species
- Thielavia basicola Zopf (1871)

Genus of fungi

Thielavia is a genus of fungi in the family Chaetomiaceae. Circumscribed by German botanist Friedrich Wilhelm Zopf in 1876, Thielavia is a teleomorph of Myceliophthora. Collectively, the genus is widely distributed, and according to a 2008 estimate, contained 31 species. Thielavia heterothallica and T. terrestris can cause infections in humans.

The genus name of Thielavia is in honour of Friedrich Joachim Sigismund von Thielau (1796–1870), who was a German forester and landowner in Breslau.

== Species ==
As accepted by Species Fungorum;

- Thielavia achromatica Subrahm. (1981)
- Thielavia ampullata J.N. Rai & Wadhwani (1977)
- Thielavia aurantiaca Tad. Ito, Okane & Nagak. (1998)
- Thielavia australiensis Tansey & M.A. Jack (1975)
- Thielavia bispora Lodha (1974)
- Thielavia coactilis Nicot (1961)
- Thielavia coerulescens Kamyschko (1965)
- Thielavia coprophila (R.K. Pathak & S.C. Agarwal) D. Hawksw. (1978)
- Thielavia egyptiaca Moustafa & Abdul-Wahid (1990)
- Thielavia elliptica (Lodha) Lodha (1978)
- Thielavia emodensis Udagawa & Y. Sugiy. (1982)
- Thielavia expansa Udagawa & Y. Sugiy. (1982)
- Thielavia inaequalis Pidopl., Kiril. & Zakharch. (1973)
- Thielavia lutescens Kamyschko (1965)
- Thielavia macrospora Lodha (1974)
- Thielavia magna (Bainier) Malloch & Cain (1973)
- Thielavia minuta (Cain) Malloch & Cain (1973)
- Thielavia minutissima D. Hawksw. (1978)
- Thielavia pakistanica L.R. Batra, S. Ahmad & Millner (1975)
- Thielavia pallidospora Pidopl., Kiril. & Zakharch. (1973)
- Thielavia phyllactinea (Bainier) Malloch & Cain (1973)
- Thielavia polygonoperda Matsush. (1975)
- Thielavia pseudomaritima D.E. Davidson (1976)
- Thielavia renominata Paclt (1951)
- Thielavia submacrospora K. Gopal & Lodha (1983)
- Thielavia wareingii Seth (1974)

Former species; (assume family Chaetomiaceae if not mentioned)

- T. albomyces (Cooney & R. Emers.) Malloch & Cain (1972) = Melanocarpus albomyces, Sordariales
- T. angulata A.C. Das (1962) = Westerdykella angulata, Sporormiaceae
- T. antarctica Stchigel & Guarro (2003) = Trichocladium antarcticum
- T. appendiculata M.P. Srivast., Tandon, Bhargava & A.K. Ghosh (1966) = Parathielavia appendiculata
- T. arenaria Mouch. (1973) = Canariomyces arenarius, Microascaceae
- T. arxii Stchigel & Guarro (2002) = Pseudothielavia arxii
- T. basicola (Berk. & Broome) Zopf (1876) = Berkeleyomyces basicola, Ceratocystidaceae
- T. boothii Manohar. & P.Rama Rao (1973) = Coniochaeta boothii, Coniochaetaceae
- T. bovina Scalia (1900) = Dichlaena bovina, Aspergillaceae
- T. californica Malloch & Benny (1973) = Chaetomium pilosum
- T. cephalothecoides Malloch & Benny (1973) = Chaetomidium cephalothecoides
- T. decidua (Malloch & Cain) Lodha (1978) = Apodus deciduus, Neoschizotheciaceae
- T. fimeti (Fuckel) Malloch & Cain (1973) = Chaetomidium fimeti
- T. fragilis (Natarajan) Arx (1975) = Hyalosphaerella fragilis
- T. gigaspora Moustafa & Abdel-Azeem (2008) = Stolonocarpus gigasporus
- T. heterothallica Klopotek (1976) = Thermothelomyces heterothallicus
- T. hyalocarpa Arx (1975) = Cladorrhinum hyalocarpum, Podosporaceae
- T. hyrcaniae Nicot (1961) = Parathielavia hyrcaniae
- T. indica Chattop. & C. Das Gupta (1957) = Preussiella indica
- T. intermedia Stchigel & Guarro (2002) = Cladorrhinum intermedium, Podosporaceae
- T. kirilenkoae Beliakova (1974) = Microthielavia ovispora
- T. kuwaitensis Moustafa (1976) = Parathielavia kuwaitensis
- T. leptoderma C. Booth (1961) = Chaetomidium leptoderma
- T. microspora Mouch. (1973) = Canariomyces microsporus, Microascaceae
- T. minor (Rayss & Borut) Malloch & Cain (1973) = Pseudothielavia terricola
- T. minuta Lodha (1974), = Thielavia minutissima, Ceratocystidaceae
- T. minuta var. thermophila Abdullah & Al-Bader (1992) = Melanocarpus thermophilus, Sordariales
- T. neocaledoniensis C. Moreau (1966) = Isia neocaledoniensis, Sordariales
- T. novoguineensis Udagawa & Y. Horie (1972) = Corynascus novoguineensis
- T. octospora (Natarajan) Arx (1975) = Achaetomium globosum
- T. ovalispora Lodha (1974) = Chaetomidium ovalisporum
- T. ovata C. Booth (1964) = Kernia ovata), Microascaceae
- T. ovispora Pidopl., Kiril. & Zakharch. (1973) = Microthielavia ovispora
- T. peruviana (Goch.) Malloch & Cain (1973) = Chrysanthotrichum peruvianum
- T. pilosa C. Booth & Shipton (1966) = Chaetomium pilosum
- T. pingtungia K.Y. Chen & Z.C. Chen (1996) = Chaetomidium pingtungium
- T. reticulata C. Booth & Ebben (1961) = Neurospora reticulata, Sordariaceae
- T. savoryi C. Booth (1961) = Coniochaeta savoryi, Coniochaetaceae
- T. sepedonium C.W. Emmons (1932) = Corynascus sepedonium
- T. setosa Dade (1937) = Chaetomidium setosum
- T. soppittii Crossl. (1901) = Microthecium brevirostre, Ceratostomataceae
- T. spirotricha (R.K. Benj.) Malloch & Cain (1973) = Botryotrichum spirotrichum,
- T. subfimeti (Seth) Malloch & Cain (1973) = Chaetomium subfimeti,
- T. subthermophila Mouch. (1973) = Canariomyces subthermophilus, Microascaceae
- T. terrestris (Apinis) Malloch & Cain (1972) = Thermothielavioides terrestris,
- T. terricola (J.C. Gilman & E.V. Abbott) C.W. Emmons (1930) = Pseudothielavia terricola,
- T. terricola f. minor Rayss & Borut (1958) = Pseudothielavia terricola,
- T. terricola var. minor (Rayss & Borut) C. Booth (1961) = Pseudothielavia terricola,
- T. tetraspora (Lodhi & J.H. Mirza) Arx (1974) = Boothiella tetraspora, Sordariaceae
- T. thermophila Fergus & Sinden (1969) = Chaetomidium thermophilum,
- T. tortuosa Udagawa & Y. Sugiy. (1981) = Condenascus tortuosus,
- T. trichorobusta (Seth) Malloch & Cain (1973) = Chaetomidium trichorobustum,
- T. variospora Cain (1961) = Pseudothielavia hamadae,
