= Chaetomium atrobrunneum =

Scientific classification
- Domain: Eukaryota
- Kingdom: Fungi
- Division: Ascomycota
- Class: Sordariomycetes
- Order: Sordariales
- Family: Chaetomiaceae
- Genus: Chaetomium
- Species: C. atrobrunneum

Binomial name
- Chaetomium atrobrunneum Ames (1949)

Synonyms
- Chaetomium fusisporale J.N. Rai & Mukerji (1962); Chaetomium rectopilium Fergus & Amelung (1971)

Species of fungus

Chaetomium atrobrunneum is a darkly pigmented mould affiliated with the fungal division, Ascomycota. This species is predominantly saprotrophic, although it has been known to infect animals including humans, showing a proclivity for the tissues of the central nervous system. Chaetomium atrobrunneum was described in 1949 from a mouldy military mattress cover obtained from the island of Guadalcanal.

== Growth and morphology ==
Chaetomium atrobrunneum is a darkly pigmented, predominantly mycelial fungus. Colonies of C. atrobrunneum typically are dark grey to black in colour with a woolly appearance. It forms sexual fruiting structures called perithecia that are spherical to oval in shape, measuring between 70 and 150 μm in width when fully matured at 10 days. The perithecia are covered sparsely with straight, finely-blistered, dark brown hairs that become occasionally become broadly branched with age. The perithecia contain asci within which are 8 ascospores that spindle-shaped, have a single sub-apical germ pore and are brown to grey in colour, although a mutant with colourless ascospores has been reported. The ascospores of this species are smooth-walled and measure 9–11 μm in length by 4.5–6 μm in width.

== Ecology and physiology ==
Chaetomium atrobrunneum has been reported from rabbit dung, milled Italian rice, water-damaged building materials, concrete, plaster and wallpaper. Chaetomium atrobrunneum grows more slowly at 25 °C (77 °F) than most other species of the genus, reaching a colony diameter of 16–21 mm after 7 days incubation on Cornmeal Agar (CMA). By contrast, its growth at higher temperatures is much more rapid than many other Chaetomium species, producing colonies of approximately 41–44 mm in diameter after 7 days incubation at 42 °C (108 °F) on CMA. Chaetomium atrobrunneum is distinct from other Chaetomium species by its smaller perithecia, its ability to grow at relatively high temperatures, and the occasional presence in this taxon of perithecial hairs that branch at wide angles.

Chaetomium atrobrunneum is strongly cellulolytic, and cellulose-containing growth media can be used to selectively cultivate this and other Chaetomium species. This species has also been reported to produce chaetoatrosin A, a selective inhibitor of chitin synthase II. This enzyme is involved in septum formation and cellular division, and its inhibition by chaetoatrosin A is thought to be the mechanism underlying the antifungal effects of C. atrobrunneum culture filtrates against several medically important fungi including Cryptococcus neoformans.

== Pathogenicity ==
Chaetomium atrobrunneum is a rare pathogen of humans that tends to infect the tissues of the central nervous system. Its pathogenicity is thought to be supported by its ability to grow at high temperatures. This species has been reported to be an agent of fatal brain abscesses in immunologically impaired people. It can also cause systemic disseminated phaeohyphomycosis affecting other organs including the lungs. Infections due to this species have typically occurred following invasive procedures such as intravenous drug administration and renal transplantation.

In addition to deep mycotic disease, C. atrobrunneum is known to eye diseases including retinitis and keratitis, manifesting with symptoms of pain, redness and watering of the eye, and swelling of the eyelid and surrounding tissues. Corneal infections have responded to dual therapy with topical natamycin and oral ketoconazole. This species has been reported from infections of the skin surrounding the eye. Co-administration of the antifungal drugs fluconazole (delivered topically) and itraconazole (delivered orally) have been effective in the treatment of cutaneous disease. Skin infections are thought to result from direct contact with environmental reservoirs of C. atrobrunneum such as soil, and accordingly farmers or children may have greater susceptibility.
