= Chaetomium cellulolyticum =

Scientific classification
- Domain: Eukaryota
- Kingdom: Fungi
- Division: Ascomycota
- Class: Sordariomycetes
- Order: Sordariales
- Family: Chaetomiaceae
- Genus: Chaetomium
- Species: C. cellulolyticum

Binomial name
- Chaetomium cellulolyticum Chahal & D. Hawksw.

Species of fungus

Chaetomium cellulolyticum is a fungus in the genus Chaetomium. It is associated with the production of cellulase.
