= Penicillium multicolor =

Scientific classification
- Kingdom: Fungi
- Division: Ascomycota
- Class: Eurotiomycetes
- Order: Eurotiales
- Family: Aspergillaceae
- Genus: Penicillium
- Species: P. multicolor

Binomial name
- Penicillium multicolor Grigorieva-Manoilova & Poradielova 1915

Type strain
- ATCC 24723, CBS 501.73, IMI 174716, KCTC 6553, VKM F-1745

Synonyms
- Penicillium implicatum var. aureomarginatum, Penicillium sclerotiorum

Species of fungus

Penicillium multicolor is an anamorph species of the genus Penicillium which produces alpha-L-fucosidase, tilactase, sclerotiorin, 8-O-Methylsclerotiorinamine, multicolosic acid and isochromophilones.
