= Philipp Wilbrand Jacob Müller =

German entomologist (1771–1851)

Philipp Wilbrand Jacob Müller (4 October 1771, Odenbach (Glan), Pfalz–1851, Odenbach an der Glan) was a German entomologist who specialised in Coleoptera.

He was a Reformed Church priest.

== Works ==
- 1817 Müller, P.W.J. 1817. Bemerkung über einige Insekten. Magazin der Entomologie 2: 266–289.
- 1818 Müller, P.W.J. 1818. Beiträge zur Naturgeschichte der Gattung Claviger. Magazine der Entomologie 3: 69–112.
- 1821 Müller, P.W.J. 1821. III. Neue Insekten. In: Germar’s E.: Magazin der Entomologie 4: 184–230.
- 1822 Müller, P.W.J. & Kunze, G. 1822. Monographie der Ameisenkäfer (Scydmaenus Latreille). Schriften der Naturforschenden Gesellschaft zu Leipzig 1: 175–204.
