= Chaetomiopsis =

Scientific classification
- Kingdom: Fungi
- Division: Ascomycota
- Class: Sordariomycetes
- Order: Sordariales
- Family: Chaetomiaceae
- Genus: Chaetomiopsis; Mustafa & Abdul-Wahid

Type species
- Chaetomiopsis dinae Mustafa & Abdul-Wahid

Genus of fungi

Chaetomiopsis is a genus of fungi within the Chaetomiaceae family. This is a monotypic genus, containing the single species Chaetomiopsis dinae.
