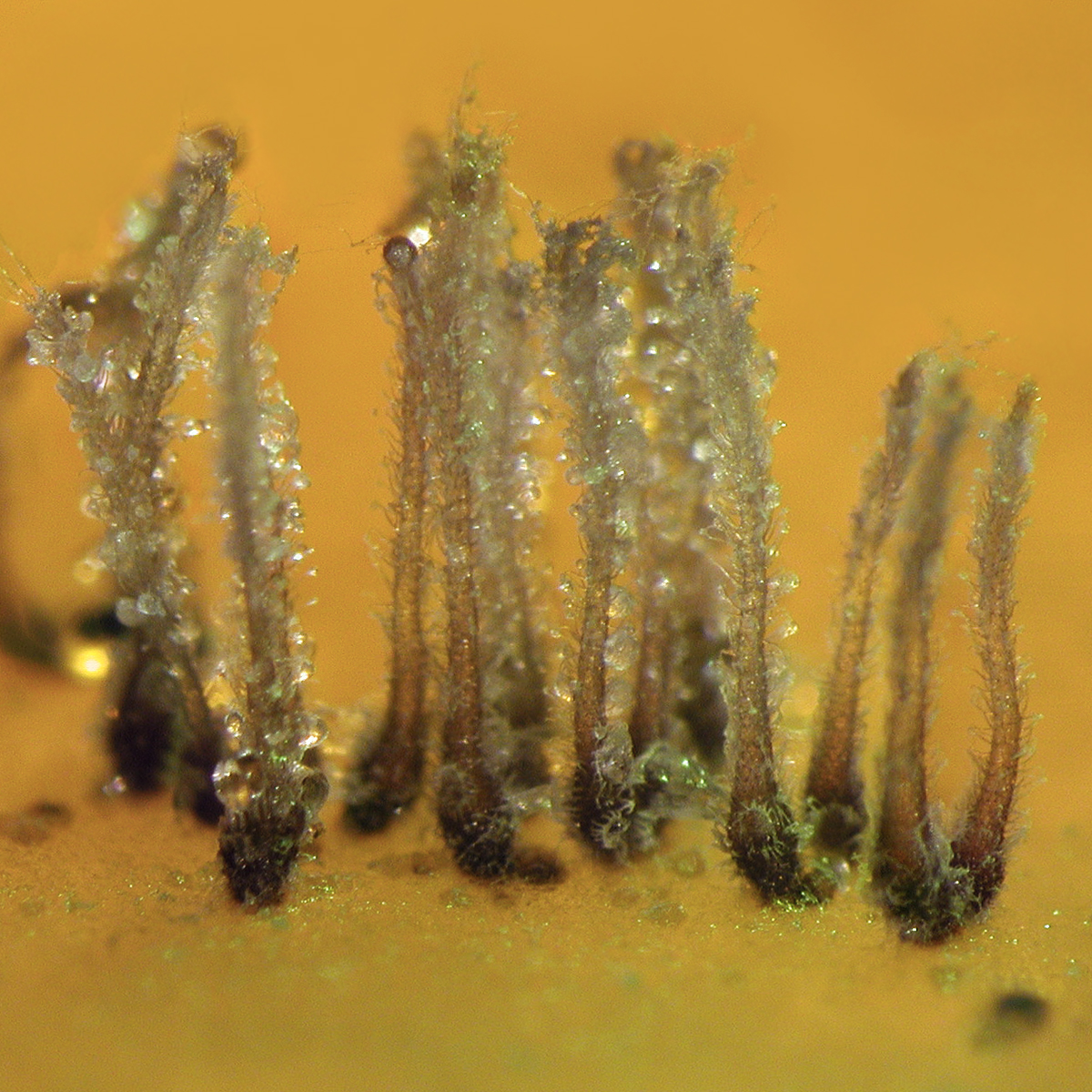

Scientific classification
- Kingdom: Fungi
- Division: Ascomycota
- Class: Sordariomycetes
- Order: Sordariales
- Family: Chaetomiaceae
- Genus: Guanomyces; M.C. Gonzáles, Hanlin & Ulloa

Type species
- Guanomyces polythrix M.C. González, Hanlin & Ulloa

= Guanomyces =

Genus of fungi

Guanomyces is a genus of fungi within the family, Chaetomiaceae. This is a monotypic genus, containing the single species Guanomyces polythrix.
