= Collariella =

Scientific classification
- Domain: Eukaryota
- Kingdom: Fungi
- Division: Ascomycota
- Class: Sordariomycetes
- Order: Sordariales
- Family: Chaetomiaceae
- Genus: Collariella; X.Wei Wang, Samson & Crous 2016

Species
- See text

Genus of fungi

Collariella is a genus of fungi in the family Chaetomiaceae.

== Species ==
- Collariella bostrychodes (Zopf) X.Wei Wang & Samson 2016
- Collariella capillicompacta M. Mehrabi-Koushki, Aghyl & M. Esfand. 2019
- Collariella carteri X.Wei Wang, Houbraken & Samson 2016
- Collariella causiiformis (L.M. Ames) X.Wei Wang & Samson 2016
- Collariella gracilis (Udagawa) X.Wei Wang & Samson 2016
- Collariella hilkhuijsenii Crous 2017
- Collariella quadrangulata (Chivers) X.Wei Wang & Samson 2016
- Collariella quadrum Z.F. Zhang, F. Liu & L. Cai 2017
- Collariella robusta (L.M. Ames) X.Wei Wang & Samson 2016
- Collariella virescens (Arx) X.Wei Wang & Samson 2016
