= Chaetomium cupreum =

Scientific classification
- Kingdom: Fungi
- Division: Ascomycota
- Class: Sordariomycetes
- Order: Sordariales
- Family: Chaetomiaceae
- Genus: Chaetomium
- Species: C. cupreum

Binomial name
- Chaetomium cupreum L.M Ames (1949)

Synonyms
- Chaetomium trilaterale var. cupreum L.M Ames (1973)

Species of fungus

Chaetomium cupreum is a fungus in the family Chaetomiaceae. It is able to decay in manufactured cellulosic materials, and is known to antagonize a wide range of soil microorganisms. This species is a component of the biocontrol agent, Ketomium, a commercial biofungicide. It has also been investigated for use in the production of natural dyes. Chaetomium cupreum is mesophilic and known to occur in harsh environments and can rapidly colonize organic substrates in soil. Laboratory cultures of C. cupreum can be propagated on a range of common growth media including potato dextrose at ambient or higher than ambient temperature producing cottony white colonies with a reddish reverse.

== History ==
Chaetomium cupreum was described by Lawrence Marion Ames in 1949 as part of a military effort to identify the organisms responsible for the biodeterioration. During this project, Ames documented 9 novel Chaetomium species including the culture Ames described as C. cupreum which was sent to him by Paul Marsh of the U.S Department of Agriculture from deteriorating material collected in the Panama Canal Zone. Ames selected the species epithet "cupreum" based on the copper coloration of the pigments produced by the fungus. A second sample was obtained by G.W Martin in Guadalcanal. Both strains were isolated from rotting clothing, tenting, mattresses and equipment.

== Description ==
The cell wall of C. cupreum is largely composed of chitin and glucan, which is reflected in the large number of acquired genes encoding class V chitin synthase and glucan synthase found in the C. cupreum cDNA. The vegetative mycelium is profusely branched, septate and multicellular; the mycelial cells are multinucleate. The species is distinguished from other Chaetomium species by a high frequency of boat-shaped ascospores and copper coloured terminal hairs. The fruiting bodies occur on the surface of the substratum and are attached by undifferentiated rhizoids. The perithecia of C. cupreum are ovate in shape and copper colored with dimensions of 110–120 x 120–130 μm. The presence of long, thin hairs on the outer surface of the perithecium is a characteristic feature of Chaetomium (Gr. χαίτη = long hair). In C. cupreum, these hairs are numerous, thin, septate lateral hairs with a base 3.0–3.5 μm in diameter. Hairs at the apex of the perithecium are rigid, septate, 4.5–6.0 μm in diameter with 1–2 spirals. The apical hairs are covered with small copper coloured granules whose pigment is soluble in alcohol, ether, cellosolve, xylol but insoluble in water. Club-shaped asci measuring 38 × 13 μm develop in clusters n the interior, basal part of the perithecium. Each ascus contains 8 reddish ascospores that are boat shaped with dimensions of 10.0 × 5.5μm. The walls of the asci are mucilaginous and disintegrate, causing the ascospores to remain inside the perithecium at maturity, embedded in mucilaginous jelly. The ascospores and the mucilaginous matrix form a paste that is extruded through the apical opening in the perithecium producing "cirrhi" resembling toothpaste squeezed out from a toothpaste tube. Chaetomium cupreum is intermediate between the species: C. trilaterale Chivers and C. aureum Chivers. C. aureum and C. cupreum both produce conspicuous cirrhi while C. trilaterale does not. The ascospores of C. cupreum are similar shape but larger than C. aureum. The pigment produced by C. trilaterale in agar cultures is water-soluble while the granules produced on C. cupreum are insoluble.

== Reproduction ==
Chaetomium cupreum is known only as a sexually reproducing species and no asexual form has been reported. Ames originally reported C. cupreum to possess a homothallic mating system but this was later contradicted by Tveit in 1955 who determined the species to be heterothallic. Sexual reproduction in C. cupreum involves the formation of ascogonia arising as lateral outgrowths of the vegetative mycelium. In early developmental stages, the ascogonia are coiled and coenocytic with septa forming as the ascogonia mature. The terminal cell of each ascogonium will become a long trichogyne which functions as the receptive organ. Male reproductive structures, antheridia are commonly absent in Chaetomium.

== Metabolism ==
The metabolism of C. cupreum is complex. In an Expressed Sequence Tag (EST) study conducted by Zhang and Yang in 2007 C. cupreum demonstrated a diverse expression of genes related to metabolic pathways. In their study the most represented metabolic pathway was glycolysis demonstrating its importance in mycelia cell metabolism. The second most represented category was porphyrin and chlorophyll metabolism, the fungi cannot produce chlorophyll but they have a heme biosynthetic pathway. Genes encoding coproporphyrinogen oxidase, an essential enzyme in the heme biosynthetic pathway were found as well as genes associated with the electron transport chain and oxidative phosphorylation. The citric acid cycle also has a role in its energy metabolism with 18% of metabolic genes relating to TCA cycle function. Saccharide metabolism associated genes were also found for the metabolism of: galactose, fructose, mannose, sucrose, starch, nucleotide sugars, amino sugars, as well as glycoprotein and peptide-protein biosynthesis. Many genes have been identified in this species that support protein biosynthesis and proteolytic systems including: glutamate, methionine and tryptophan metabolism; phenylalanine, valine, leucine and isoleucine degradation; valine, leucine, isoleucine, tyrosine and tryptophan biosynthesis. Proteases produced by C. cupreum are involved in pathogen cell wall breakdown and contribute to its biocontrol activity. Biotechnological interest in C. cupreum is related to its production of cellulase and laccase. C. cupreum is able to degrade catechin.

== Biotechnology ==
Agricultural interest in C. cupreum has arisen due to the ability of some strains to suppress infections by plant pathogens. The biocontrol capacity of C.cupreum has been attributed to the production of antifungal metabolites, release of hydrolases, mycoparasitism and competition for nutrients and space. Chaetomium cupreum produces a diverse set of hydrolytic enzymes making it a strong biodegrader and substrate colonizer as a result of its large secretory potential and metabolic versatility. EST analysis of C. cupreum revealed several candidate biocontrol genes related to: cell-wall degradation, proteolytic function, antifungal metabolite production and production of substances that enhance plant disease resistance.

Chaetomium cupreum has genes encoding cell wall hydrolases including: β 1–3 exoglucanase, endoglucanase IV, β glucosidase 5 and 6, and chitinase. β 1–3 exoglucanase, endoglucanase IV and β glucosidases are major lytic enzymes targeting the fungal cell wall responsible for breaking down β-1,3-glucans. These and other hydrolases targeting fungal cell wall components function synergistically and are presumed to play an important role in mycoparasitism. β-1,3-glucan binding protein present in C. cupreum bind specifically to β-1,3-glucan and lipoteichoic acids in the cell wall of pathogens causing aggregation of the invading fungi for host and biocontrol fungi cell recognition and protection. The induction of plant resistance involves xylanases, xylanase genes are found in C. cupreum. The destruction of nascent chitin of pathogens generates oligosaccharides containing GlcNAC which elicits a general antifungal response from C. cupreum. C. cupreum also produces subtilisin-like serine protease and aspartic proteinases found in C. cupreum that contribute to cell wall degradation and deactivation of pathogen enzymes.

=== Antifungal metabolites ===
Chaetomium cupreum produces a range of antifungal metabolites including polyketide synthase, terpenes, chetomin, rotiorinols A-C, "multidrug resistance protein", isopenicillin N synthase and related dioxygenases some of which have been investigated for pharmaceutical use. A beta-lactamase-like major facilitator in C. cupreum provides tolerance to toxic compounds, such as fungicides. Several pigments produced by this species including rotiorinols A & C, (-)-rotiorin and rubrorotiorin have been shown to exhibit antifungal activity against the pathogenic yeast, Candida albicans. Pigment produced by C. cupreum has in vitro antagonistic activity against the phytopathogenic bacterium, Ralstonia solanacearum.

=== Commercial use ===
Chaetomium cupreum is able to antagonize a wide set of plant pathogens including Magnaporthe grisea, Rhizoctonia solani and Cochliobolus lunatus. Registered and commercially available as "Ketomium" mycofungicide, Ketomium is a biofungicide comprising 22-strains of C. cupreum and C. globosum for use in disease control of various pathogens. The product has been implementation as a biocontrol agent in a number of geographic localities including China, Philippines, Russia, Vietnam and Thailand. Ketomium has been shown to produces an endurable protection against pathogens including: Phytophthora palmivora, Phytophthora nicotianae, Phytophthora cactorum, Fusarium oxysporum, and Athelia rolfsii. These phytopathogens are known to infect economically important plants such as durian, black peppers, tangerine, strawberry, tomato, corn and pomelo.

=== Pigments ===
The extracellular pigment produced by C. cupreum is influenced by environmental factors such as pH in which low pH causes the pigments to turn yellow and high pH restores the characteristic red colour. In a photoresponse study researchers investigated the effect of variable wavelengths of visible light on the production of pigments. C. cupreum biomass and pigment production were variable depending on the wavelength of light used during the 7 day incubation period. The white colonies produced ascospores and a deep red, water-soluble reverse pigment. Incubation in white light lead to the largest colony diameter while green light lead to the greatest pigment production. The varying concentrations suggests pigment loss, possibly explained by nutrient depletion induced enzymatic breakdown of pigments – a common phenomena where secondary metabolites are degraded by enzymes.
