= Chaetomidium =

Scientific classification
- Kingdom: Fungi
- Division: Ascomycota
- Class: Sordariomycetes
- Order: Sordariales
- Family: Chaetomiaceae
- Genus: Chaetomidium (Zopf) Sacc.

Type species
- Chaetomidium fimeti (Fuckel) Zopf

Genus of fungi

Chaetomidium is a genus of fungi within the Chaetomiaceae family. The genus name is synonymous with Aporothielavia (Malloch & Cain).
