= Corynascella =

Scientific classification
- Kingdom: Fungi
- Division: Ascomycota
- Class: Sordariomycetes
- Order: Sordariales
- Family: Chaetomiaceae
- Genus: Corynascella; Arx & Hodges

Type species
- Corynascella humicola Arx & Hodges

Genus of fungi

Corynascella is a genus of fungi within the Chaetomiaceae family.
