= Achaetomium =

Scientific classification
- Kingdom: Fungi
- Division: Ascomycota
- Class: Sordariomycetes
- Order: Sordariales
- Family: Chaetomiaceae
- Genus: Achaetomium; J.N. Rai, J.P. Tewari & Mukerji

Type species
- Achaetomium globosum J.N. Rai, J.P. Tewari & Mukerji

Genus of fungi

Achaetomium is a genus of fungi within the Chaetomiaceae family. Achaetomium belong to the phylum Ascomycota, and are usually endophytic or soil saprophytes, which are fungi that have been rarely reported as human or animal pathogens.

== Species ==
As accepted by Species Fungorum;

- Achaetomium brevissimum H.J. Chowdhery & J.N. Rai (1980)
- Achaetomium globosum J.N. Rai & J.P. Tewari (1964)
- Achaetomium indicum Kulshr., Raych. & A.Z.M. Khan (1977)
- Achaetomium lippiae M.G. Viana, C.C. Albuq., E.S. Santos, J.D.P. Bezerra & L.M. Paiva (2017)
- Achaetomium macrocarpum J.N. Rai & H.J. Chowdhery (1974)
- Achaetomium macrosporum J.N. Rai, Wadhwani & J.P. Tewari (1970)
- Achaetomium marinum H.J. Chowdhery & J.N. Rai (1980)
- Achaetomium raii Locq.-Lin. (1980)
- Achaetomium sphaerocarpum J.N. Rai & H.J. Chowdhery (1974)
- Achaetomium sulphureum J.N. Rai & H.J. Chowdhery (1974)
- Achaetomium thermophilum M. Basu (1982)
- Achaetomium umbonatum K. Rodr., Stchigel & Guarro (2004)
- Achaetomium variosporum Sultana, Malik & L.R. Batra (1988)

Former species; (all in family Chaetomiaceae)

- A. cristalliferum Faurel & Locq.-Lin. (1980) = Chaetomium strumarium
- A. fusisporum J.N. Rai & H.J. Chowdhery (1974) = Achaetomium macrosporum
- A. hamadae Udagawa (1982) = Pseudothielavia hamadae
- A. indicum J.N. Rai & H.J. Chowdhery (1978) = Achaetomium raii
- A. irregulare (Sörgel) K. Rodr., Stchigel & Guarro (2004) = Subramaniula flavipila
- A. luteum J.N. Rai & J.P. Tewari (1964) = Chaetomium luteum
- A. nepalense Udagawa & Y. Sugiy. (1982) = Chaetomium nepalense
- A. purpurascens Udagawa & Y. Sugiy. (1982) = Chaetomium purpurascens
- A. strumarium J.N. Rai, J.P. Tewari & Mukerji (1964) = Chaetomium strumarium
- A. thielavioides Arx, Mukerji & N. Singh (1978) = Subramaniula thielavioides
- A. thielavioides var. microsporum Sultana, Malik & L.R. Batra (1988) = Subramaniula thielavioides
- A. uniapiculatum J.N. Rai & H.J. Chowdhery (1971) = Chaetomium uniapiculatum
