= Setiferotheca =

Scientific classification
- Kingdom: Fungi
- Division: Ascomycota
- Class: Sordariomycetes
- Order: Sordariales
- Family: Chaetomiaceae
- Genus: Setiferotheca; Matsush.

Type species
- Setiferotheca nipponica Matsush

Genus of fungi

Setiferotheca is a genus of fungi within the Chaetomiaceae family. This is a monotypic genus, containing the single species Setiferotheca nipponica.
