= Chaetoxanthone =

Chaetoxanthone A
Chaetoxanthone B
Chaetoxanthone C
Chaetoxanthone D

Identifiers
| CAS Number | A: 1052639-24-3; B: 1052639-25-4; C: 1052639-26-5; D: 1843267-68-4 |
| 3D model (JSmol) | A: Interactive image; B: Interactive image; C: Interactive image; D: Interactive image |
| ChEBI | A: CHEBI:65611; B: CHEBI:65612; C: CHEBI:65613 |
| ChEMBL | A: ChEMBL501998; B: ChEMBL527064; C: ChEMBL499872 |
| ChemSpider | A: 24711218; B: 24720687; C: 24707899 |
| PubChem CID | A: 44586905; B: 44586906; C: 25058081 |
| CompTox Dashboard (EPA) | A: DTXSID501110140; B: DTXSID601121211 |
- InChI: A: InChI=1S/C20H18O7/c1-20-8-9(21)6-13(26-20)16-14(27-20)7-12-17(19(16)23)18(22)15-10(24-2)4-3-5-11(15)25-12/h3-5,7,9,13,21,23H,6,8H2,1-2H3/t9-,13+,20+/m1/s1 Key: PYEDKAHYOPGAKC-PDXJJUDESA-N; B: InChI=1S/C20H18O6/c1-20-8-4-7-12(25-20)16-14(26-20)9-13-17(19(16)22)18(21)15-10(23-2)5-3-6-11(15)24-13/h3,5-6,9,12,22H,4,7-8H2,1-2H3 Key: ZUEKQPJBVORAFH-UHFFFAOYSA-N; C: InChI=1S/C20H19ClO6/c1-9-5-3-7-12(26-9)14-18(23)15-17(22)13-10(25-2)6-4-8-11(13)27-20(15)16(21)19(14)24/h4,6,8-9,12,23-24H,3,5,7H2,1-2H3/t9-,12-/m1/s1 Key: MWYMVCYBLZZWPG-BXKDBHETSA-N; D: InChI=1S/C21H22O6/c1-11-6-4-8-15(26-11)19-16(25-3)10-12(22)17-20(23)18-13(24-2)7-5-9-14(18)27-21(17)19/h5,7,9-11,15,22H,4,6,8H2,1-3H3/t11-,15-/m1/s1 Key: MUBFTAAOQKTFBO-IAQYHMDHSA-N
- SMILES: A: C[C@]12C[C@@H](C[C@H](O1)C3=C(O2)C=C4C(=C3O)C(=O)C5=C(O4)C=CC=C5OC)O; B: CC12CCCC(O1)C3=C(O2)C=C4C(=C3O)C(=O)C5=C(O4)C=CC=C5OC; C: C[C@@H]1CCC[C@@H](O1)C2=C(C(=C3C(=C2O)C(=O)C4=C(O3)C=CC=C4OC)Cl)O; D: O(C)C=1C(=C2C(C(=O)C=3C(O2)=CC=CC3OC)=C(O)C1)[C@@H]4O[C@H](C)CCC4
- Except where otherwise noted, data are given for materials in their standard state (at 25 °C [77 °F], 100 kPa). Infobox references

Chaetoxanthones are a class of chemical compounds which are classified as xanthones. They have been isolated from marine-derived fungi in the genus Chaetomium. There are four compounds in the class that are designated as chaetoxanthones A through D. A laboratory synthesis of (±)-chaetoxanthone B has been reported. The chaetoxanthones are under investigation as potential antimalarials.
