= Corynascus =

Scientific classification
- Kingdom: Fungi
- Division: Ascomycota
- Class: Sordariomycetes
- Order: Sordariales
- Family: Chaetomiaceae
- Genus: Corynascus; Arx

Type species
- Corynascus sepedonium (C.W. Emmons) Arx

Genus of fungi

Corynascus is a genus of fungi within the Chaetomiaceae family.
