= Emilmuelleria =

Scientific classification
- Kingdom: Fungi
- Division: Ascomycota
- Class: Sordariomycetes
- Order: Sordariales
- Family: Chaetomiaceae
- Genus: Emilmuelleria; Arx

Type species
- Emilmuelleria spirotricha (R.K. Benj.) Arx

Genus of fungi

Emilmuelleria is a genus of fungi within the Chaetomiaceae family. This is a monotypic genus, containing the single species Emilmuelleria spirotricha.
