= Boothiella =

Scientific classification
- Kingdom: Fungi
- Division: Ascomycota
- Class: Sordariomycetes
- Order: Sordariales
- Family: Chaetomiaceae
- Genus: Boothiella; Lodhi & J.H. Mirza (1962)

Type species
- Boothiella tetraspora Lodhi & J.H. Mirza

Genus of fungi

Boothiella is a genus of fungi within the Chaetomiaceae family. This is a monotypic genus, containing the single species Boothiella tetraspora.

The genus name of Boothiella is in honour of Colin Booth (1924 - 2003), a British botanist (mycology) and plant pathologist. He was deputy director of the International Mycological Institute (IMI) in Kew.
