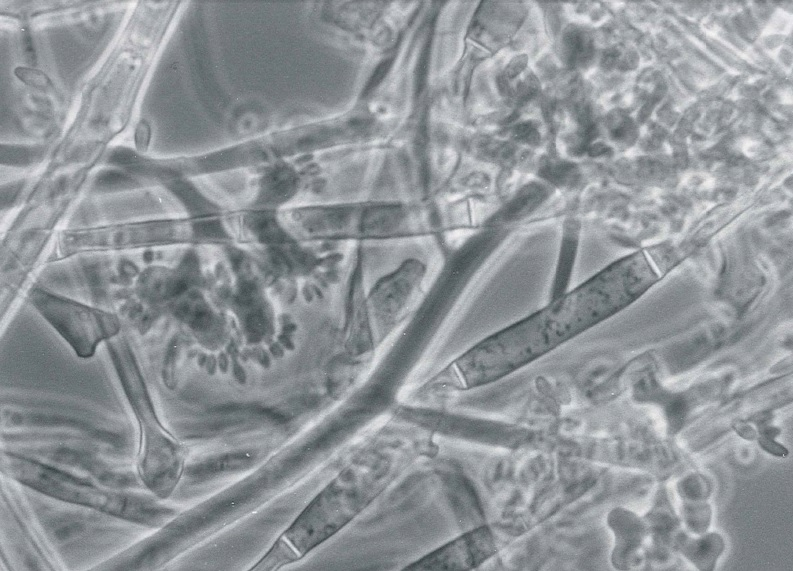

Scientific classification
- Kingdom: Fungi
- Division: Ascomycota
- Class: Sordariomycetes
- Order: Sordariales
- Family: Chaetomiaceae
- Genus: Botryotrichum; Saccardo & Marchal, 1885

Species
- See text

Synonyms
- Emilmuelleria Arx, Sydowia (1986)

= Botryotrichum =

Genus of fungi

Botryotrichum is a genus of soil and indoor fungus first described in 1885.

== Species ==
The following species are currently accepted in the genus Botryotrichum:

- Botryotrichum atrogriseum
- Botryotrichum cyaneum
- Botryotrichum domesticum
- Botryotrichum foricae
- Botryotrichum gorakhpurensis
- Botryotrichum indicum
- Botryotrichum keratinophilum
- Botryotrichum lachnella
- Botryotrichum murorum
- Botryotrichum nematophagus
- Botryotrichum pampeanum
- Botryotrichum peruvianum
- Botryotrichum piluliferum
- Botryotrichum spirotrichum
- Botryotrichum verrucosum
- Botryotrichum villosum
