= Sclerotiorin =

Names
- Preferred IUPAC name (7R)-5-Chloro-3-[(1E,3E,5S)-3,5-dimethylhepta-1,3-dien-1-yl]-6,8-dioxo-7,8-dihydro-6H-2-benzopyran-7-yl acetate

Identifiers
CAS Number	549-23-5
3D model (JSmol)	Interactive image
ChemSpider	4940697
PubChem CID	6436015
UNII	BA54VZ8Z50
- InChI: InChI=1S/C21H23ClO5/c1-6-12(2)9-13(3)7-8-15-10-16-17(11-26-15)19(24)21(5,27-14(4)23)20(25)18(16)22/h7-12H,6H2,1-5H3/b8-7+,13-9+/t12-,21+/m0/s1 Key: SWJLTKXURNHVHE-UPWXJBBJSA-N; InChI=1/C21H23ClO5/c1-6-12(2)9-13(3)7-8-15-10-16-17(11-26-15)19(24)21(5,27-14(4)23)20(25)18(16)22/h7-12H,6H2,1-5H3/b8-7+,13-9+/t12-,21+/m0/s1 Key: SWJLTKXURNHVHE-UPWXJBBJBP
- SMILES: CC[C@H](C)/C=C(\C)/C=C/C1=CC2=C(C(=O)[C@](C(=O)C2=CO1)(C)OC(=O)C)Cl

Properties
Chemical formula	C_{21}H_{23}ClO_{5}
Molar mass	390.86 g·mol^{−1}
- Except where otherwise noted, data are given for materials in their standard state (at 25 °C [77 °F], 100 kPa). Infobox references

Sclerotiorin is an antimicrobial Penicillium frequentans isolate. Sclerotiorin is an aldose reductase inhibitor (IC_{50}=0.4 μM) as well as a reversible lipoxygenase inhibitor (IC_{50}=4.2 μM).
