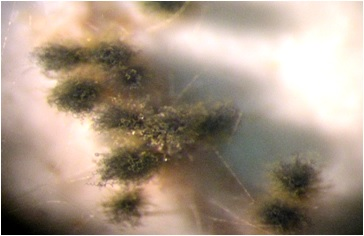
- Fruiting bodies of Chaetomium globosum

Scientific classification
- Domain: Eukaryota
- Kingdom: Fungi
- Division: Ascomycota
- Class: Sordariomycetes
- Order: Sordariales
- Family: Chaetomiaceae
- Genus: Chaetomium
- Species: C. globosum

Binomial name
- Chaetomium globosum Kunze (1817)

= Chaetomium globosum =

Species of fungus

Chaetomium globosum is a well-known mesophilic member of the mold family Chaetomiaceae. It is a saprophytic fungus that primarily resides on plants, soil, straw, and dung. Endophytic C. globosum assists in cellulose decomposition of plant cells. They are found in habitats ranging from forest plants to mountain soils across various biomes. C. globosum colonies can also be found indoors and on wooden products.

Chaetomium globosum are human allergens and opportunistic agents of ungual mycosis and neurological infections. However such illnesses occur at low rates.

== Description ==
=== Metabolism ===
Like most Chaetomium species, C. globosum decomposes plant cells using hyphal cellulase activity. Even though they are known to cause soft rot rather than brown rot, C. globosum plant decomposition leaves behind lignin residues. They can decay a variety of wood types such as aspen and pine and even change the colour of paper and books. The cellulase activity of C. globosum functions best at temperatures ranging from 25-32 degrees Celsius and is stimulated by nitrogen and biotin. Cellulase is inhibited by ethyl malonate.

Like many fungal species, C. globosum obtains their energy from carbon sources such as glucose, mannitol and fructose. Fructose is usually digested outside the hyphae using fructokinase activity, whereas glucose enters the cell undigested for cellular metabolism. Even though glucose is the most preferred carbon source, C. globosum mycelium growth occurs at a higher rate when treated with acetate rather than glucose. Carbohydrates can also be stored within the fungus as glycogen and trehalose energy reserves.

=== Sporulation ===
Homothallic C.globosum sexual sporulation produces flat lemon-shaped ascospores within clavate ascomata. The appearance of C.globosum fruiting bodies are similar to the pycnidia of the genus Pyrenochaeta. The ascomata optimally fructify at temperatures ranging from 18-20 degrees Celsius and develop asci with 8 ascospores each. Additional conditions such as neutral pH, mild levels of carbon dioxide, the presence of calcium ions, and soluble sugar media also assist in the development of fruiting bodies. The soluble sugar media consists of glucose, maltose, sucrose, and cellulose.

Sporulation preferably occurs in the dark and at high temperatures around 26 degrees Celsius. The presence of cellulose is also crucial for sporulation. The smooth ascospores are initially red in colour, however upon maturation both the fruiting body and ascospores are dematiaceous. Dark perithecia with unbranched radiating hairs can be seen as well. C. globosum perithecia are similar in appearance to the related species of Chaetomium elatum, however the latter is distinguished by its branched perithecial hairs. C. globosum ascospores can withstand temperatures slightly higher than optimal, however temperatures exceeding their thermal death point of 55 degrees Celsius, is lethal for the spores.

=== Germination ===
Ascospores germinate by releasing globose vesicles from their apical germ pores which later develop into germ tubes. The germ tubes then grow into hyaline septate hyphae. Filamentous irregular hyphal growth allows the colony to spread and develop into pale aerial mycelium. Hyphal growth increases the diameter of the fungal colony which is often a parameter for fungal growth. According to Domsch et al., C. globosum species are fast growing colonies and can grow up to 5.5 cm in diameter over a period of 10 days. The germination of ascospores can be inhibited by tannin and species of Streptomyces. On the other hand, germination is stimulated by glucose. Glucose deprivation can result in reduced levels of germination.

== Pathology ==
=== Indoor allergen ===
Chaetomium globosum can be commonly found contaminating damp buildings throughout North America and Europe. Approximately 10-30% of North American homes contain moisture induced molds. This poses a health concern due to the allergic nature of these fungi. Both the C. globosum hyphae and the spores contain antigens such as Chg45, to induce IgE and IgG antibody production in allergic individuals. Although the IgE upsurge is transient, increased IgG levels persist in the serum. This can lead to non-atopic asthma, sinusitis, and respiratory illnesses in the residents of contaminated buildings. Such allergic onsets can be prevented with the use of potassium chlorate in building materials. Chlorate, toxic to many fungal strains, disrupts nitrate reduction in fungi by using fungal nitrate reductase to produce the toxic chlorite. Although it is unclear as to whether C. globosum contains nitrate reductase, chlorate is still a well known C. globosum toxin. However, even though chlorate suppresses perithecia formation, it does not affect hyphal growth nor sporulation.

Chaetomium globosum colonies are potential allergens, and when residing on damp buildings, they are usually the casual agents of poor indoor air quality. Colonies can be detected on wet building wood and also on tiles. Even though spores are usually not detected in the air, inhalation can trigger allergic response and respiratory illnesses.

=== Onychomycosis ===
Although C. globosum are saprophytes, they can cause opportunistic human onychomycosis and cutaneous infections. Such non-dermatophytic species are responsible for a small percentage of onychomycosis cases. Nonetheless, such pathology is rare in humans. The first well known case of C. globosum onychomycosis appeared in Korea where the patient developed hyperkeratosis of the nails. The disease symptoms were cured with antifungal terbinafine and amorolfine treatment. Amphotericin B is ineffective towards pathogenic species of the Chaetomium genus.

Cerebral and pulmonary infections due to Chaetomium species are not uncommon. They are known to cause superficial mycoses in immunocompromised patients. C. globosum can induce petechia and skin lesions, as well as phaeohyphomycosis and brain abscess. The latter diseases are very rare. In one case, an immunocompromised renal transplant patient developed fatal brain abscess due to a C. globosum infection. It was unclear as to how the strain disseminated to the brain. To identify the pathogen, infected tissue was treated with KOH. The resultant displayed septate dark hyphae, characteristic of C. globosum.

=== Mycotoxins ===
Chaetomium globosum produce emodins, chrysophanols, chaetoglobosins A, B, C D, E and F, as well as chetomin, and the azaphilones, chaetoviridins. Chetomin induce mammalian and gram positive bacterial toxicity. This allows plants infected with C. globosum to resist bacterial diseases. The cytochalasin mycotoxins, chaetoglobosins A and C, disrupt cellular division and movement in mammalian cells. These cytochalasins bind to actin and affect actin polymerization. In fact, chaetoglobosin A is highly toxic in animal cells, even at minimal doses.

The mycotoxins benefit C. globosum colonies by assisting their growth. This usually occurs at neutral pH when the mycotoxins are produced at optimal levels.

Mycotoxic chaetoviridins, are known to suppress tumor formation in mice treated with C. globosum. Their cytotoxic activity disrupts cancer cells. Understanding the role of such mycotoxins could lead to novel drug applications.

== Agricultural use ==
Chaetomium globosum are endophytic to many plants. Their asymptomatic colonization supports plant tolerance to metal toxicity. Heavy metals such as copper, suppress plant growth and disrupt metabolic processes, e.g. photosynthesis. When maize plants were treated with C. globosum, they expressed less growth inhibition and increased biomass. C. globosum is also known to reside in Ginkgo biloba plants. Such plants use this endophytic fungus to suppress bacterial pathogens. In fact, ascospore inoculation reduces bacterial disease symptoms such as wilting, apple scabs, and seed blight in treated plants. Enhancing plant stress tolerance and microbial defense, renders C. globosum application beneficial for agricultural use.
