= Gustav Kunze =

German naturalist (1793–1851)

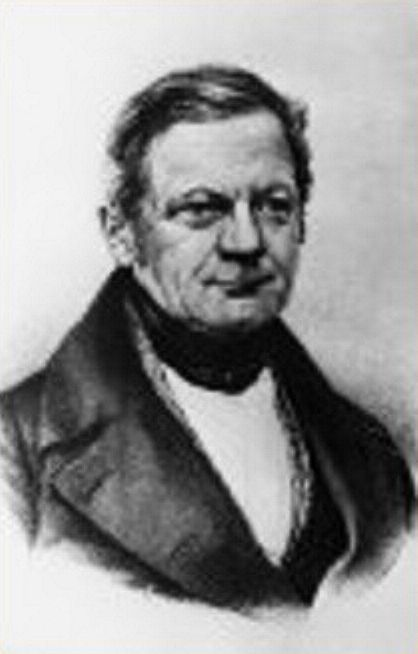
- Born: 4 October 1793; Leipzig, Saxony
- Died: 30 April 1851 (aged 57); Leipzig, Saxony
- Education: University of Leipzig
- Known for: Ferns, orchids, exsiccata series, founding the Naturforschende Gesellschaft zu Leipzig
- Awards: Foreign member of the Royal Swedish Academy of Sciences
- Scientific career
- Fields: Botany, Zoology, Entomology
- Workplaces: University of Leipzig
- Author abbrev. (botany): Kunze

Gustav Kunze (4 October 1793 in Leipzig – 30 April 1851 in Leipzig) was a German professor of zoology, an entomologist and botanist with an interest mainly in ferns and orchids.

He was editor of some exsiccata series, one issued together with Johann Carl Schmidt under the title Deutschlands Schwämme in getrockneten Exemplaren (1816-1819). Kunze joined the Wernerian Natural History Society in Edinburgh in 1817. He later became Zoology Professor at Leipzig University and in 1837 was appointed director of the Botanical Gardens in Leipzig.

Kunze supported the botanical voyages (1823-1828) of Eduard Friedrich Poeppig in North and South America and distributed his plant material in several exsiccata-like series, among others Pöppig Coll. Pl. Chil. I. Later on he supported the botanical voyages (1844-1845) of Heinrich Moritz Willkomm in Southern Spain and Portugal and finally published a species list in 1846. In parallel Kunze edited and distributed the exsiccata work Chloris austro-Hispanica. E collectionibus Willkommianis, a m. majo MDCCCXXXXIV ad finum m. maji MDCCCXXXXV factis / composuit G. Kunze, in Univ. Lipsiensi botan. prof. In 1851, he was elected a foreign member of the Royal Swedish Academy of Sciences.

The plant genus Kunzea was named in his honour.

== Works ==
- Beiträge zur Monographie der Rohrkäfer. Neue Schrift. Naturf. Ges. Halle, 2 (4): 1-56. (1818).
- Die Farrnkrauter in Kolorirten Abbildungen: Naturgetreu Erläutert und Beschrieben. 2 volumes (1847-1851).
- Index Filicum (sensu latissimo) in Hortis Europæis Cultarum Synonymis Interpositis Auctus, cura A. Baumanni. Orig. in Linnaea XXXIII (1850). Pub. as book (1853).
- Zeugophora (Jochträger) eine neue Käfergattung. Neue Schrift. Naturf. Ges. Halle, 2 (4):. 71-76.(1818).
- with Philipp Wilbrand Jacob Müller 1822. Monographie der Ameisenkäfer (Scydmaenus Latreille). Schriften der Naturforschenden Gesellschaft zu Leipzig 1: 175–204.

== Collection ==
His collection is in Naturkundemuseum Leipzig.

== See also ==
- Category:Taxa named by Gustav Kunze
