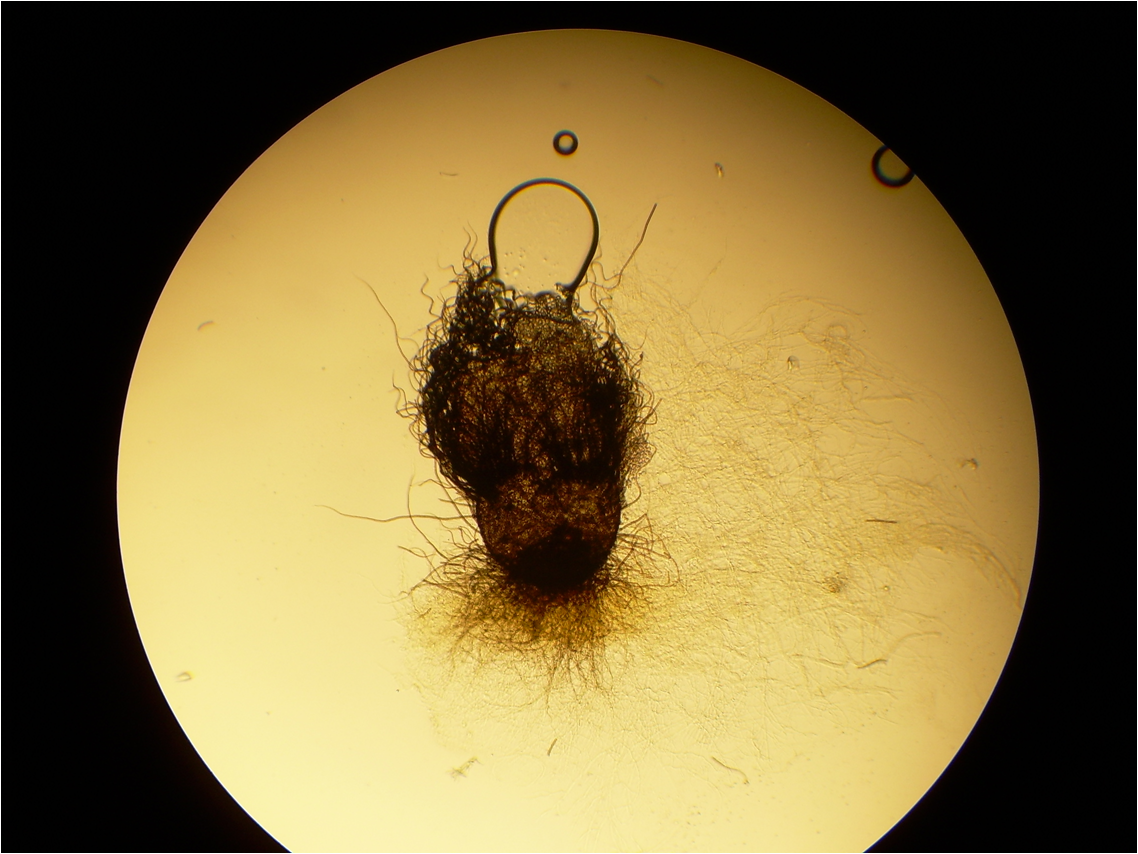
- A Chaetomium perithecium

Scientific classification
- Kingdom: Fungi
- Division: Ascomycota
- Class: Sordariomycetes
- Order: Sordariales
- Family: Chaetomiaceae
- Genus: Chaetomium; Kunze (1817)

Type species
- Chaetomium globosum Kunze ex Fr. (1829)

Species
- ~95

= Chaetomium =

Genus of fungi

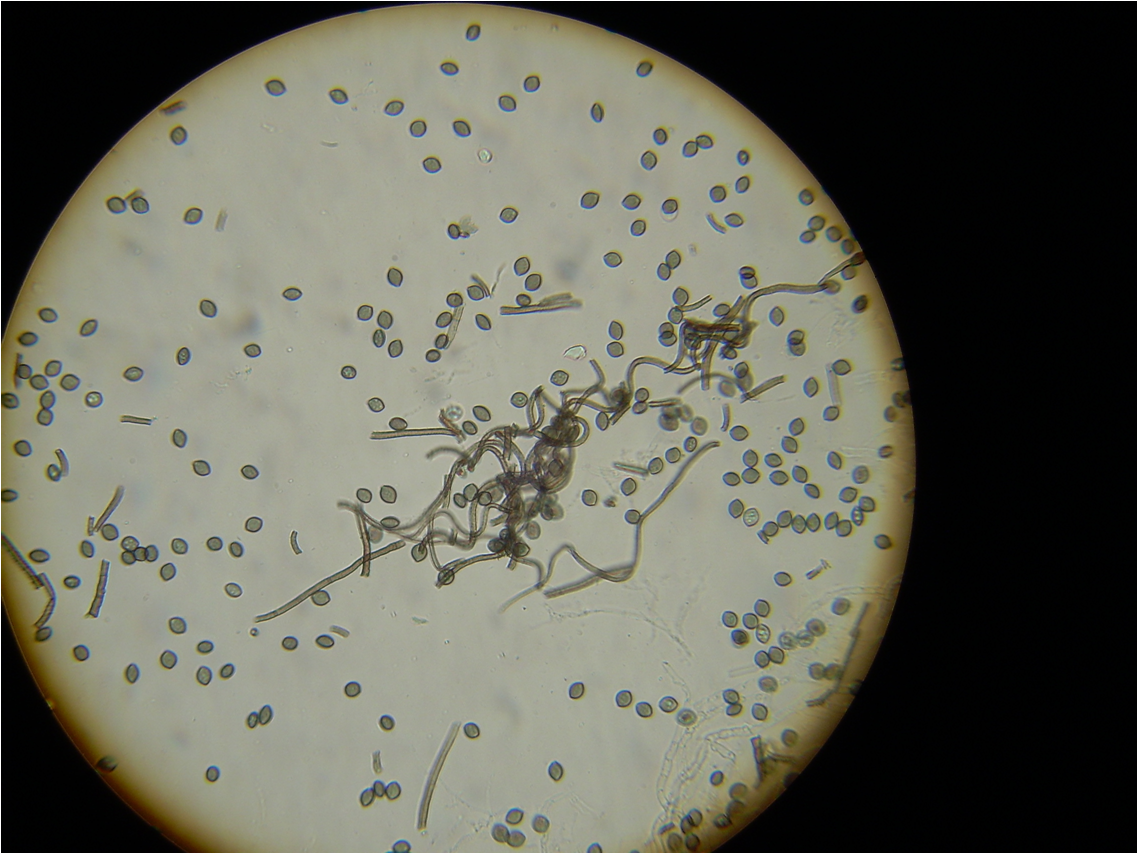
Chaetomium ascospores with their characteristic football shape

Chaetomium is a genus of fungi in the Chaetomiaceae family. It is a dematiaceous (dark-walled) mold normally found in soil, air, cellulose and plant debris. According to the Dictionary of the Fungi (10th edition, 2008), there are about 95 species in the widespread genus.

In 1817 Gustav Kunze established the genus Chaetomium (the plume of the helmet) to classify the species C. globosum and C. elatum. No further contributions to the genus were made until 1837 when the publication of Corda described its characteristic asci in his work, Icones Fungorum Hucusque Cognitorum. In 1915, Arthur Houston Chivers produced a complete monographic treatment of the genus, recognizing only 28 of the described 114 species.

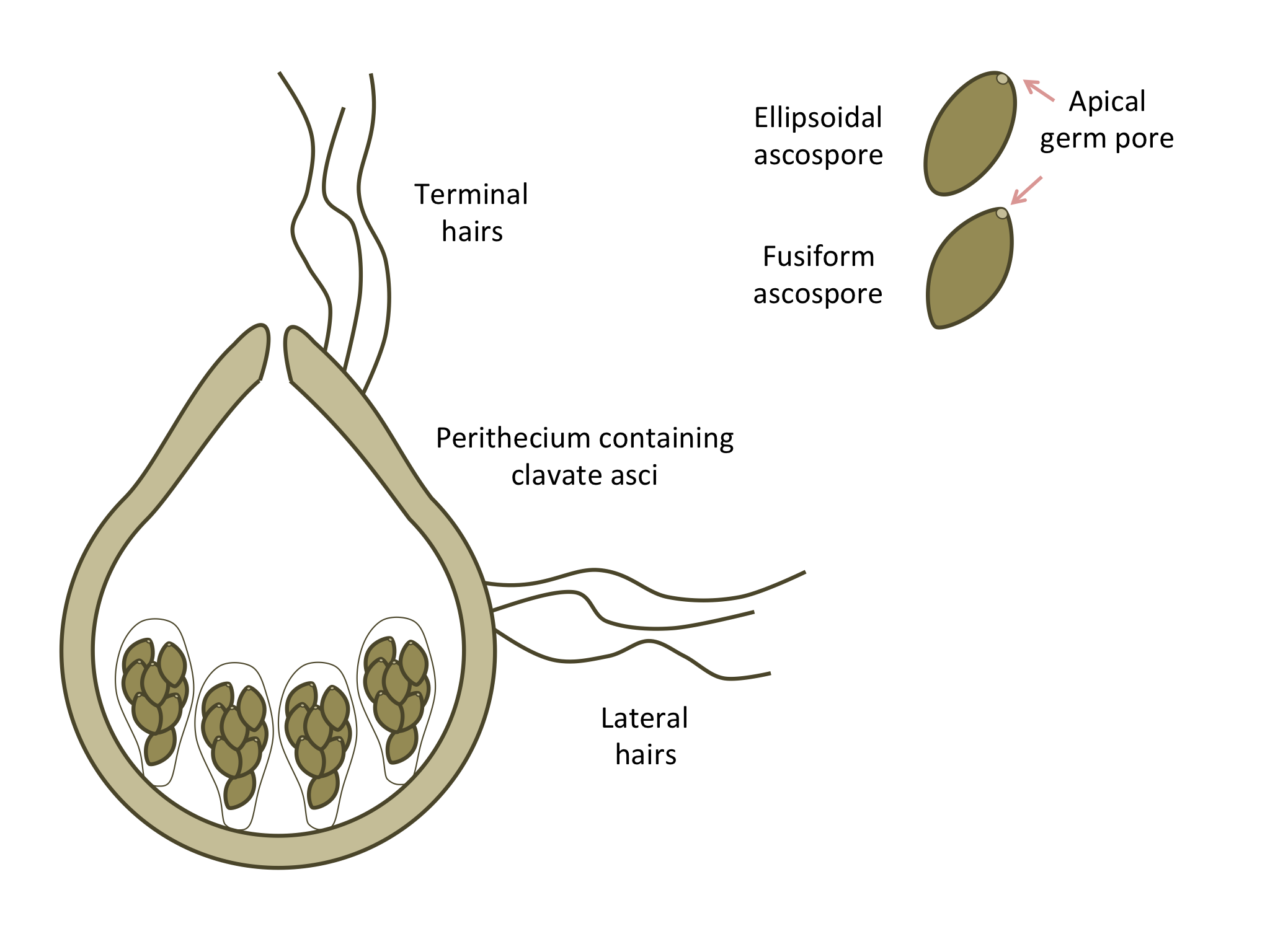
Prototypical ascoma and ascospores of members of the genus Chaetomium sensu lato (including Achaetomium, Amesia, Arcopilus, Botryotrichum, Chaetomium sensu stricto, Collariella, Dichotomopilus, and Ovatospora)

Members of this genus typically have superficial, ostiolar perithecia, covered in hairs. Asci are often clavate and evanescent, bearing eight spores. Ascospores are usually lemon-shaped, commonly colored olive-brown. Mycelia often grows in conglomerate masses that resemble ropes.

As well as being a contaminant, Chaetomium spp. are also encountered as causative agents of infections in humans. Many cases cause type 1 allergic reactions and infections. A few cases of fatal deep infections due to Chaetomium atrobrunneum have been reported in immunocompromised people. Other clinical syndromes include brain abscess, peritonitis, and onychomycosis.

== Selected species ==
- Chaetomium atrobrunneum
- Chaetomium carinthiacum
- Chaetomium cupreum
- Chaetomium cellulolyticum
- Chaetomium elatum
- Chaetomium funicola
- Chaetomium globosum
- Chaetomium grande
- Chaetomium interruptum
- Chaetomium iranianum
- Chaetomium jatrophae
- Chaetomium megalocarpum
- Chaetomium perlucidum
- Chaetomium rectangulare
- Chaetomium strumarium
- Chaetomium subspirale
- Chaetomium thermophilum
- Chaetomium truncatulum
- Chaetomium olivaceum
- Chaetomium undulatulum
