= Germ pore =

Fungal spore anatomy

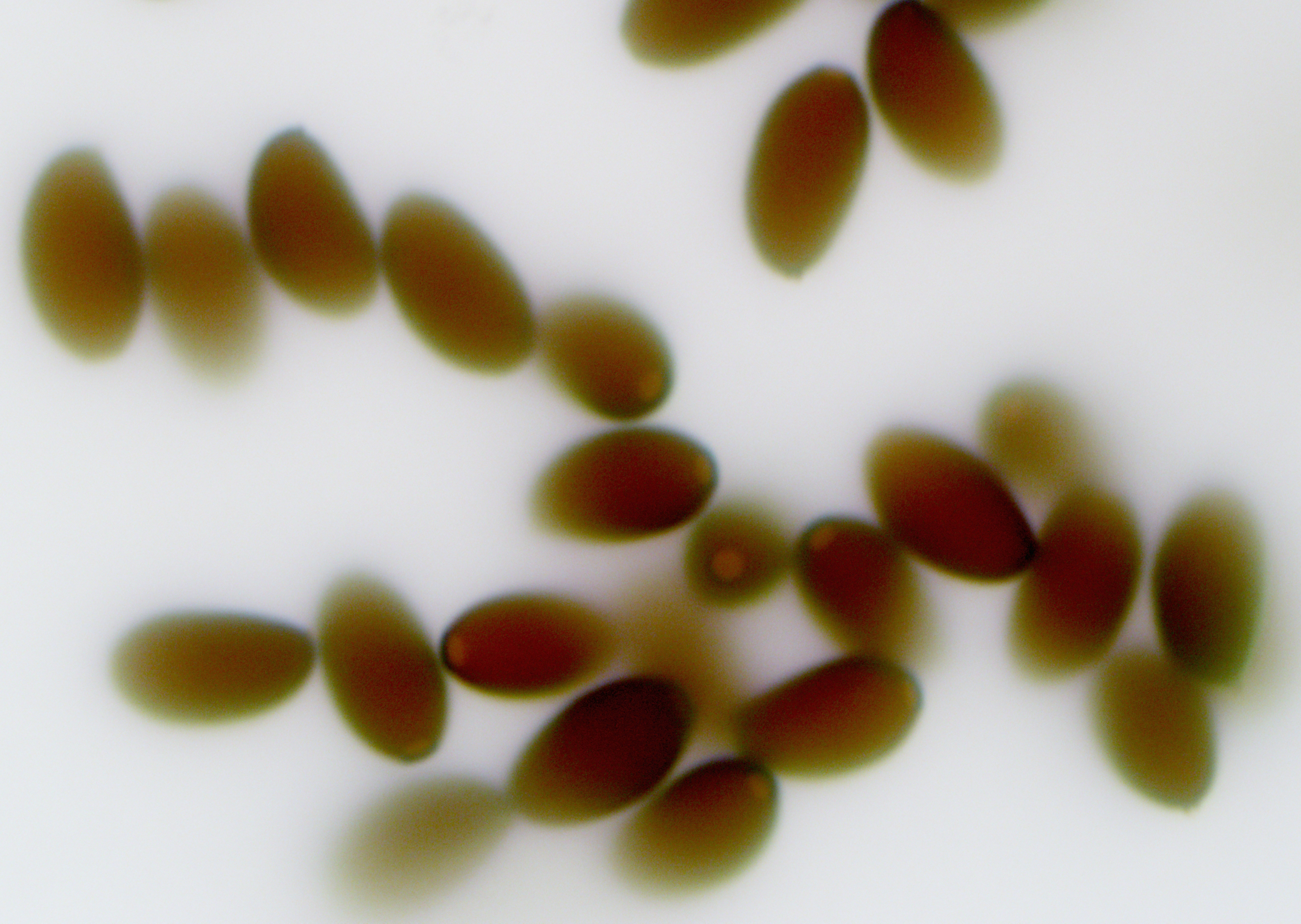
The germ pores are the pale circular features. Click image.

A germ pore is a small pore in the outer wall of a fungal spore through which the germ tube exits upon germination. It can be apical or eccentric in its location, and, on light microscopy, may be visualized as a lighter coloured area on the cell wall.

Apical germ pore is mushroom spore which has a pore at one end. Some spores have a hole in the cell wall where the first strand of germinating mycelium emerges. If the cell wall is divided from one end to the other, this is called a germ slit. Commonly the germ pore is at one end of the mushroom spore and is called an apical pore.

Mushroom genera with apical germ pores include Agrocybe, Panaeolus, Psilocybe, and Pholiota.

== See also ==
- mycelium
- spore
