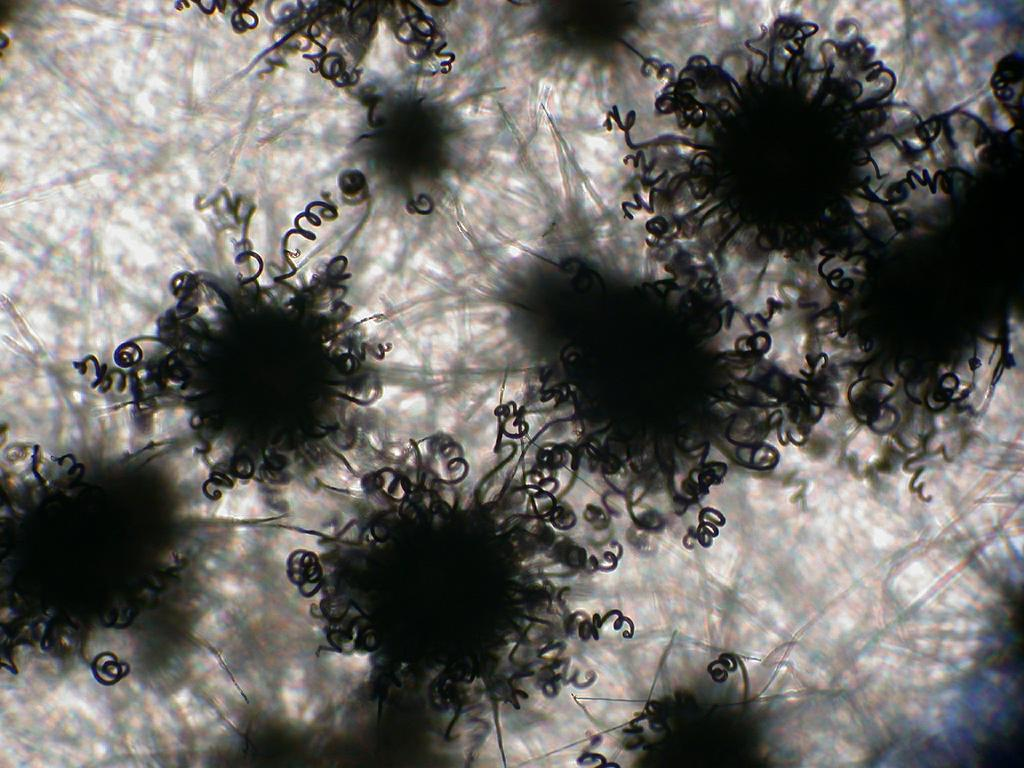
- Chaetomium sp.

Scientific classification
- Kingdom: Fungi
- Division: Ascomycota
- Class: Sordariomycetes
- Order: Sordariales
- Family: Chaetomiaceae; G.Winter

Type genus
- Chaetomium Kunze

Genera
- See text

= Chaetomiaceae =

Family of fungi

The Chaetomiaceae are a family of fungi in the Ascomycota, order Sordariales, class Sordariomycetes. Chaetomiaceae are usually saprobic or parasitic. Cheatomiaceae are a great source of enzymes with diverse biotechnological and industrial applications such as PMO (polysaccharide monooxygenase), L-methioninase, β-1,3-glucanase, laccase, dextranase, lipolytic, pectinolytic, amylolytic, chitinolytic, and proteolytic enzymes. The production of such compounds can be taken into account as candidates for the development of effective and novel lead compounds for medicine, biological control and production of bioactive secondary metabolites. Chaetomiaceae furthermore contains some of the most well known thermophilic fungi, an interesting feature carrying many biological applications, but that is found only in few fungal genera.

== Genera ==
- Achaetomium
- Bommerella
- Boothiella
- Botryotrichum
- Chaetomidium
- Chaetomiopsis
- Chaetomium
- Collariella
- Corynascella
- Corynascus
- Emilmuelleria
- Erythrocarpon
- Farrowia
- Guanomyces
- Setiferotheca
- Subramaniula
- Thielavia
- Trichocladium
