= Anopodium ampullaceum =

Scientific classification
- Kingdom: Fungi
- Division: Ascomycota
- Class: Sordariomycetes
- Order: Sordariales
- Family: Lasiosphaeriaceae
- Genus: Anopodium
- Species: A. ampullaceum

Binomial name
- Anopodium ampullaceum N. Lundq (1964)

Species of fungus

Anopodium ampullaceum is a species of fungus first discovered by Nils Lundqvist in Sweden, in the year 1964. A. ampullaceum became one of the first few fungi along with Anopodium epile and Podospora dagonerii, to be placed in the new genus Anopodium due to their unique spores that did not suit the description of the spores of the Podospora genus, which P. dagonerii had previously belonged to. The genus Anopodium deviates from other members of the Sordariomycetes class by two spore characteristics; firstly the pedicels of its spore in the apical position, and secondly due to its immature spores having spherical bodies with cylindrical apical regions. As of 1998 all three of these species are now considered to be one species, using the name A. ampullaceum.

== History ==
Anopodium ampullaceum was first discovered in 1964 by N. Lundqvist in Sweden. A. ampullaceum was first discovered on blue hare dung, then lemming dung both in Sweden and was later discovered on rabbit dung in Oise, France. Lundqvist originally believed A. ampullaceum to be a member of the genus Podospora. Upon further investigation of the A. ampullaceum spores Lundqvist concluded that A. ampullaceum along with the two other closely related species he was examining, Anopodium epile and Podospora dagonerii, all belong in the newly formed genus Anopodium. These fungi spores begin as cylindrical or vermiform type hyaline and are non-septate, for this reason they can not be considered as Podospora spores. Lundqvist also believed that these 3 fungal species have evolved independently from a species closely related to the family Lasiosphaeria. Much later on in 1998 M.J. Richardson studied these three fungal species in-depth gathering samples from various regions of Sweden and France. Upon examination of the spores characteristics such as spore length and width and ampullate hair presence, Richardson concluded that these three species can all be considered the same species with the correct name being Anopodium ampullaceum.

== Related Species ==
Anopodium ampullaceum is most closely related to and similar in morphology to A. epile. A. ampullaceum and A. epile differ most in the presence or absence of ampullate hairs of the top region of the perithecium, their spore lengths and widths, and their pedicel shape of the spores. Despite these variation A. ampullaceum and A. epile are still considered to be the same species under the name A. ampullaceum.

== Appearance ==
Anopodium ampullaceum is most commonly characterized by its spores pedicels that face upwards toward the apex of its ascus. Its spores are polar with both an apical and basal side. The A. ampullaceum perithecia where spores are discharged is a non-stromatic, membrane enclosed structure, that is light in colour with a dark neck, and is covered in hair. The A. ampullaceum has a filiform paraphyses. The ascus is uni-tunicated with an invagination on the apical side and an apical ring that is barely visible. A. ampullaceum spores begin their cycle as a single cell with a spherical body and a cylindrical apical end. In the next stage of its cycle the spore becomes a two celled structure with the lower cell swelling into an ellipsoid shape and a dark brown upper cell. The pedicels of the spores have gelatinous bodies, and ampullate hairs on the neck. The ampullate hairs of the pedicels were considered as determinants of A. ampullaceum identification, but after further examination of various samples it was decided that the presence of ampullate hairs was far too variable to be a marker of the fungal species.

== Ecology ==
Anopodium ampullaceum is commonly found in hare and rabbit dung, as it was initially discovered on Blue hare and lemming dung in Sweden. Prior to the merging of the A. ampullaceum fungi with A. epile and P. dagonerii, A. ampullaceum seemed to be restricted to leporid hare dung. By its modern name A. ampullaceum has been found in dung samples from Sweden, France and the United Kingdom.
