= Cercophora areolata =

Scientific classification
- Kingdom: Fungi
- Division: Ascomycota
- Class: Sordariomycetes
- Order: Sordariales
- Family: Neoschizotheciaceae
- Genus: Cercophora
- Species: C. areolata

Binomial name
- Cercophora areolata N. Lundq. (1972)

Species of fungus

Cercophora areolata is a member of the Ascomycota division, and is grouped into the Lasiosphaeriaceae family based on morphology. C. areolata is a coprophilous fungus that has been most recently isolated from porcupine dung. Defining features of C. areolata include: 1) ovoid-conical, glabrous ascomata, 2) black, carbonaceous, areolate peridium and 3) clavate-shaped, single-walled asci. From studies on C. areolata, this fungus produces multiple antifungal compounds, which inhibit other competitor fungi.

== History and taxonomy ==
Nils Lundqvist, a Swedish mycologist, first discovered Cercophora areolata in 1891, and the description of C. areolata was not published until 1972 in the book Nordic Sordariaceae s. lat, written by Lundqvist himself. Lundqvist first stumbled upon the holotype of C. areolata in Aspvik, Gustavavsberg, Uppland, Sweden, on the dung of Equus caballus. The holotype was first named Hypoxylon coprophila,; However, there is little information regarding C. areolata with this synonym. Based on morphology and molecular data, C. areolata is grouped into the Lasiosphaeriaceae taxonomic clade alongside several members of the Arnium genus. The ascomata of these Arnium species have glabrous or have flexuous hairs, similar to the perithecia of C. areolata. A subclade within this clade is supported by C. areolata, Arnium mendax and Arnium inaequilaterale.

== Morphology ==
Cercophora areolata produces perithecia, also known as ascomata, which are fruiting bodies with necks. The perithecia of C. areolata are described as ovoid to conical, aggregated, non-stromatic, ostiolate (have small pores for the discharge of spores), and they have cone-shaped, ridged necks. Perithecia may be glabrous, enveloped with flexuous, brown, septate thick hairs or with short, hyaline (colourless), cylindrical, septate hairs. The perithecia are also characterized as superficial, in which the perithecia appear along the stalk, similar to the phenotype of the Ophiocordyceps species.

The peridium, the protective covering of the perithecium, appears pseudoparenchymatous, meaning it resembles the parenchyma of plant tissue, but consists of fungal hyphae woven together. The peridium is further described as black-brown, opaque, carbonaceous, has 3 layers and is areolate. C. areolata has the most distinct areolate pattern, in which the peridium cracks into broad polygone plates along edges of hyaline cells. The peridial cells in the outer layer resemble the shape of a prism, are thick-walled, and are in a radial arrangement in each polygone. The peridial cells in the middle layer appear flattened. Perithecial contents are yellow, similar to Lasiosphaeria ovina and some Cercophora species. However, L. ovina and other Cercophora species present contrasting peridium, which are more membranaceous and ochraceous (ochre-coloured) to light brown. When specimens are desiccated, the yellow colour dissipates. The areolate peridium is similar to Lasiosphaeria dichroospora, Bombardia manihotis, Sordaria striata, Cercophora coprogena, C. californica, Zopfiella, and Cephalotheca.

As a member of the Ascomycota, C. areolata has asci, sacs that grow in the ascomata and house the developing sexual spores. The asci contain about 8 ascospores, are clavate-shaped (thicker at the apex) and are unitunicate, meaning they are single-walled. The asci become costate (ribbed) after bursting of the perithecium, a process known as dehiscence. The ascus tip possesses a thick, double-apical ring and lacks a sub-apical globulus. Paraphyses, erect filament-like structures, appear longer than asci. The ascospores contained within the asci are arranged in series of 2–3. In immature asci, the spores are initially hyaline (colourless), single-celled, cylindrical, vermiform (worm-like), slightly sigmoid, and smooth. Sticky gelatinous tails called "caudae" are attached at both ends of each ascospore.

== Growth and Habitat ==
Cercophora areolata is a fimicolous or coprophilous fungus, a fungus that preferably colonizes the dung of herbivores. Animal dung serves as a nutrient-rich source for coprophilous fungi, providing high content of nitrogen and carbohydrate. C. areolata has been isolated from porcupine dung.

== Antifungal and cytotoxic compounds ==
Many fimicolous fungi exhibit interspecies competition, or fungal antagonism, which entails the generation of inhibiting chemicals targeting other species. Thus, Cercophora areolata produces many secondary metabolites such as Cercophorin A, Cercophorin B, Cercophorin C, allowing for C. areolata to display antibacterial and antifungal activity. C. areolata also produces decarboxycitrinone, 4-acetyl-8-hydroxy-6-methoxy-5-methylisocoumarin and roridin E.

Cercophorins A-C are 8-hydroxyisocoumarin derivatives. Cercophorin A is a white, solid substance, whereas cercophorin B and C are yellow, solid substances. Cercophorins A-C demonstrate antifungal and cytotoxic activity against Sordaria fimicola and Ascobolus furfuraceus. Cercophorins A-C act to impede the growth of these early successional coprophilous fungi, which appear much earlier on dung and have more rapid metabolisms. From standard disk assays, Cercophorin A generated zones of inhibition of about 26 and 16mm when tested on Bacillus subtilis and Staphylococcus aureus, respectively. Thus, Cercophorin A is most potent against B. subtilis and S. aureus.

Decarboxycitronine displayed antifungal activity against S. fimicola and A. furfuraceus, as treatment resulted in 100% reduction in radial growth. Roridin E, a known trichothecene mycotoxin, also demonstrated antifungal activity, as it caused 100% reduction in growth of S. fimicola and A. furfuraceus. Roridin E executes anti-Candida activity.

Cercophorins A-C are novel antifungal agents, as there a no known analogs in other species. Decarboxycitronine is similar to a product from Penicillium citrinum, decarboxydihydrocitrinone. 4-acetyl-8-hydroxy-6-methoxy-5-methylisocoumarin is derived from another antifungal metabolite in Aspergillus viridinutans. All of these secondary metabolites are the first natural antifungal agents to be described from the genus Cercophora.
