= Zopfiella =

Scientific classification
- Kingdom: Fungi
- Division: Ascomycota
- Class: Sordariomycetes
- Order: Sordariales
- Family: Lasiosphaeriaceae
- Genus: Zopfiella; G.Winter (1884)

Type species
- Zopfiella tabulata (Zopf) G.Winter (1884)

Genus of fungi

Zopfiella is a genus of fungi within the Lasiosphaeriaceae family.

The genus was circumscribed by Heinrich Georg Winter in Rabenh. Krypt.-Fl. ed.2, vol. 1 (2) on page 56 in 1884.

The genus name of Zopfiella is in honour of Friedrich (or Friederich) Wilhelm Zopf (1846–1909), who was a well-known German botanist and mycologist. He dedicated to his whole life with fungal biology, particularly in classification of fungi and dye production in fungi and lichens.

== Species ==
As accepted by Species Fungorum;

- Zopfiella attenuata Udagawa & Furuya (1974)
- Zopfiella cephalothecoidea Guarro, Abdullah, Al-Saadoon & Gené (1996)
- Zopfiella ebriosa Guarro, P.F. Cannon & Aa (1991)
- Zopfiella erostrata (Griffiths) Udagawa & Furuya (1974)
- Zopfiella flammifera L.H. Huang (1973)
- Zopfiella indica Devadatha, Jeewon & V.V. Sarma (2019)
- Zopfiella inermis (Cailleux) Malloch & Cain (1971)
- Zopfiella latipes (N. Lundq.) Malloch & Cain (1971)
- Zopfiella lundqvistii Shearer & J.L. Crane (1978)
- Zopfiella neogenica O'Keefe (2017)
- Zopfiella ovina (Udagawa) Guarro (1988)
- Zopfiella pleuropora Malloch & Cain (1971)
- Zopfiella submersa Guarro, Al-Saadoon, Gené & Abdullah (1997)
- Zopfiella tabulata (Zopf) G. Winter (1884)
- Zopfiella tardifaciens (Udagawa) Guarro (1988)
- Zopfiella udagawae Guarro & Punsola (1983)

Former species;

- Z. backusii (L.H. Huang) Guarro (1986) = Triangularia backusii, Podosporaceae family
- Z. carbonaria (W. Phillips & Plowr.) Arx (1973) = Jugulospora carbonaria, Neoschizotheciaceae
- Z. curvata (Fuckel) G. Winter (1884) = Diffractella curvata, Sordariales
- Z. karachiensis (S.I. Ahmed & Asad) Guarro (1988) = Lundqvistomyces karachiensis, Schizotheciaceae
- Z. leucotricha (Speg.) Malloch & Cain (1971) = Cladorrhinum leucotrichum, Podosporaceae
- Z. longicaudata (Cain) Arx (1972) = Triangularia longicaudata, Podosporaceae
- Z. macrospora Guarro & Calvo (1983) = Podospora macrospora, Podosporaceae
- Z. marina Furuya & Udagawa (1975) = Pseudorhypophila marina, Naviculisporaceae
- Z. matsushimae Udagawa & Furuya (1976) = Triangularia matsushimae, Podosporaceae
- Z. pilifera Udagawa & Furuya (1972) = Pseudorhypophila pilifera, Naviculisporaceae
- Z. tanzaniensis (R.S. Khan & J.C. Krug) Guarro, P.F. Cannon & Aa (1991) = Lundqvistomyces tanzaniensis, Schizotheciaceae
- Z. tetraspora (J.N. Rai, Mukerji & J.P. Tewari) S. Ahmad (1978) = Triangularia tetraspora, Podosporaceae
