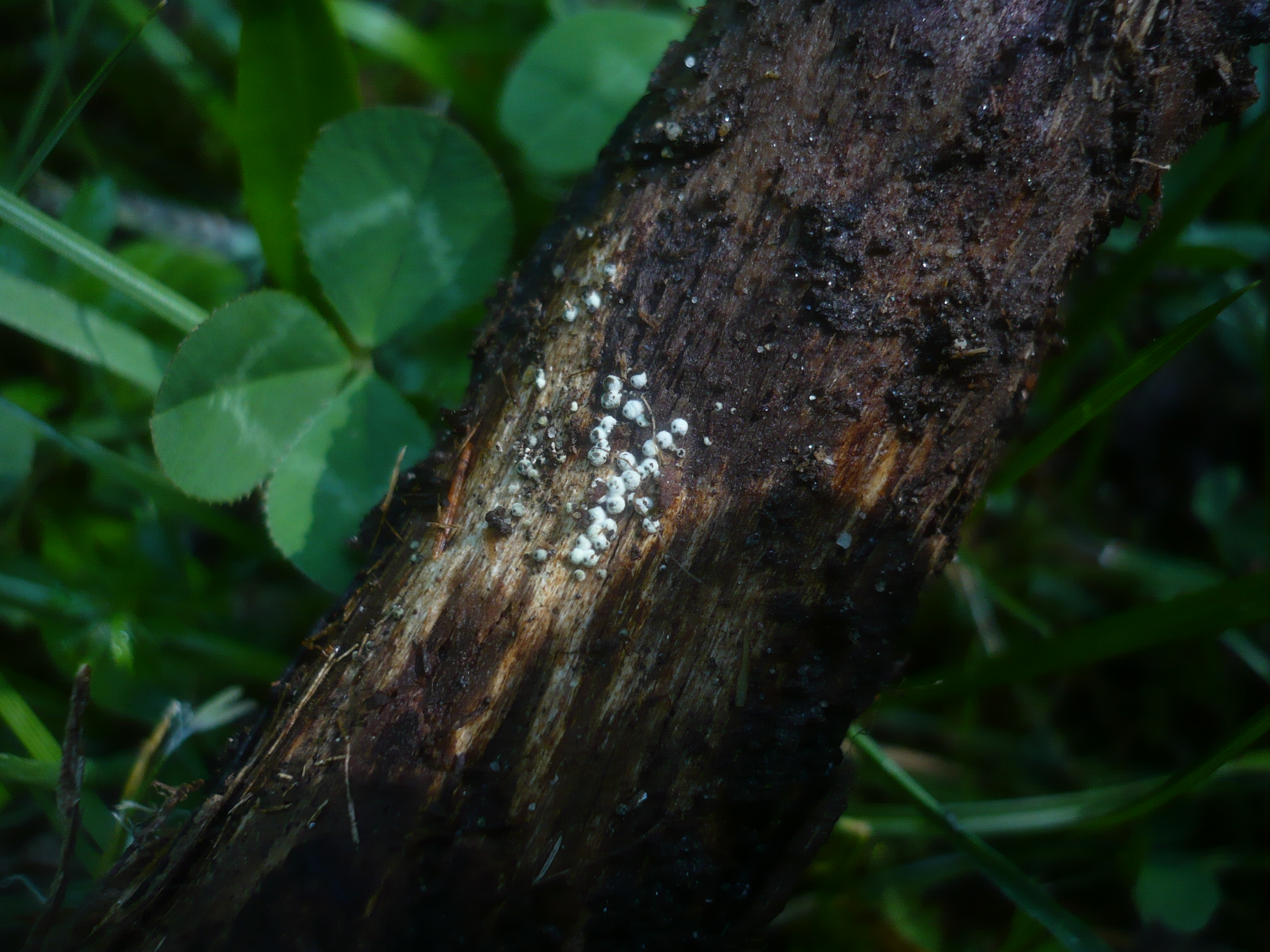

Scientific classification
- Kingdom: Fungi
- Division: Ascomycota
- Class: Sordariomycetes
- Order: Sordariales
- Family: Lasiosphaeriaceae
- Genus: Lasiosphaeria
- Species: L. ovina

Binomial name
- Lasiosphaeria ovina (Pers.) Ces. & De Not. (1863)

= Lasiosphaeria ovina =

Species of fungus

Lasiosphaeria ovina is a species of fungus belonging to the family Lasiosphaeriaceae.
