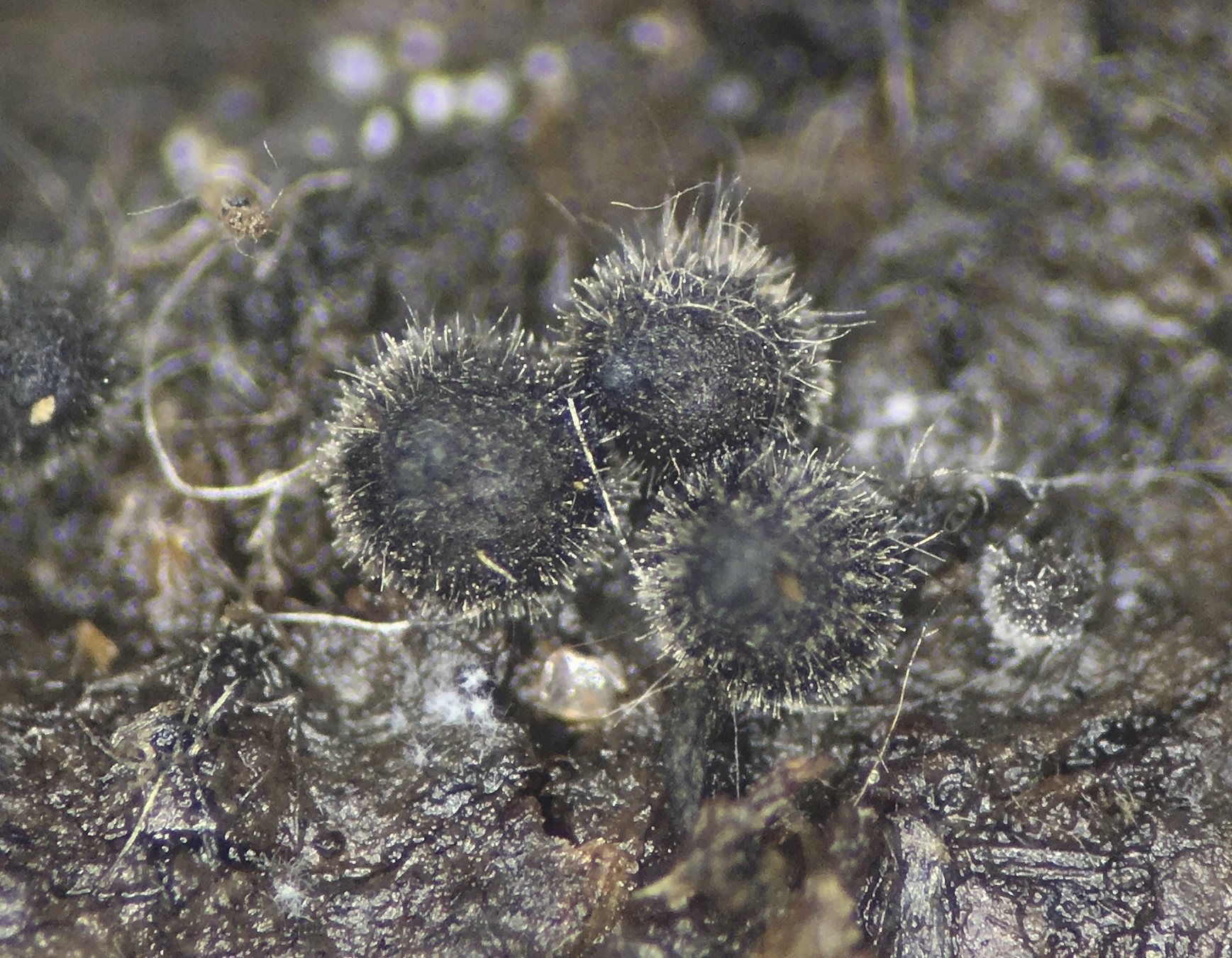

Scientific classification
- Domain: Eukaryota
- Kingdom: Fungi
- Division: Ascomycota
- Class: Sordariomycetes
- Order: Sordariales
- Family: Podosporaceae
- Genus: Podospora
- Species: P. appendiculata

Binomial name
- Podospora appendiculata (Auerswald ex Niessl) Niessl (1883)

Synonyms
- Sordaria appendiculata Auersw. ex Niessl (1872); Podospora fimiseda var. appendiculata (Auersw. ex Niessl) G.Winter (1885); Pleurage appendiculata (Auersw. ex Niessl) C.Moreau (1953); Sordaria winteri P.Karst. (1873); Sphaeria amphicornis Ellis (1876)

= Podospora appendiculata =

Species of fungus

Podospora appendiculata is a coprophilous fungus that is most commonly found in the dung of lagomorphs, such as hares and rabbits, in temperate to warm climates. A member of the division Ascomycota, P. appendiculata is characterized by ovoid, hair-studded perithecia which can bear a distinctive violaceous colouring and peridia which are leathery, in texture. Podospora appendiculata produces three secondary metabolites (appenolides) with antimicrobial properties.

== History and taxonomy ==
The fungus was first collected by the German mycologist Bernhard Auerswald from hare dung found near the German city of Leipzig. Auerswald sent a sample in a letter to Gustav Niessl von Mayendorf, who published a description of the species under the name Sordaria appendiculata in 1872 before reclassifying it under the genus Podospora in 1883.

Contesting Auerswald and Niessl's work, Heinrich Georg Winter later argued in 1885 that the fungus was merely a variant of the species Podospora fimiseda with smaller spores. Winter's assessment was supported by George Edward Massee and Ernest Stanley Salmon, but, upon closer examination in 1934, the Canadian mycologist R. F. Cain agreed with Niessl and set Podospora appendiculata apart as its own species. The cylindrical or conical appearance of the pedicel (an uncoloured, cytoplasm-filled appendage attached to each ascospore) in P. appendiculata allows it to be distinguished easily from P. fimiseda, whose pedicels are club-like in shape.

Podospora appendiculata was also discovered independently slightly after Auerswald in 1873 by the Finnish mycologist Petter Adolf Karsten, who classified it as Sordaria winteri, and in 1876 by Job Bicknell Ellis who classified it under the name Sphaeria amphicornis.

== Habitat and ecology ==
Podospora appendiculata is a coprophilous fungus that grows on the dung of many herbivorous animals but is most strongly associated with the dung of lagomorphs, a group which includes hares and rabbits. While it has been recovered from the dung of horses and cows, Podospora appendiculata tends only to appear in excrement found in forests. In more domesticated settings, such as pastures as fields, P. appendiculata is considerably more scarce. The fungus grows widely in temperate to warm climates, and has been identified naturally in New Zealand, Israel, Japan, Brazil, and in areas throughout North America and Europe.

Evidence also exists for an antagonistic relationship between P. appendiculata and certain other coprophilous species. Analysis of 137 global dung samples recovered from nations such as England, Scotland, Yugoslavia and New Zealand revealed a statistically significant negative association between the incidence of P. appendiculata and the occurrence of Ascobolus immersus, Lasiobolus ciliatus, and Podospora curvula.

== Morphology ==
Podospora appendiculata produces perithecia, necked fruiting bodies laden with sexual spores. Unlike perithecia obtained from other ascomycota, however, perithecia from P. appendiculata lack very prominent necks. Its perithecia are ovoid, appear blackish to purplish, have hyaline (uncolored) tips, and are covered evenly with short, stiff hairs. These hairs are wide and brown at the base, and, like the perithecia, have hyaline, uncoloured tips.

The peridium, or outer covering, of each perithecium possesses a coriaceous (leathery) texture and can have a violaceous colouring. Such colouring is very rare amongst coprophilous pyrenomycetes, and in this manner P. appendiculata is similar to two other fungal species both belonging to the genus Cercophora: Cercophora septentrionalis and Cercophora caerulea.

As with other members of the ascomycota, the perithecia of P. appendiculata are filled with asci (singular: ascus) that contain, in turn, the sexual ascospores. Each ascus is clavate (club-like) in shape, possesses a small apical ring, and contains 8 ascospores arranged in a biseriate (two-rowed) manner. In contrast to other members of the genus Podospora, the ascospores of P. appendiculata bunch together in the middle of each ascus instead of spreading out through the entire enclosure evenly.

While early on in development each ascospore is clavate and hyaline, they become dark in colouring and ellipsoid in shape as they mature. Ascospores all have incredibly sticky, gelatinous, tail-like appendages called caudae, a pedicel that is cylindrical to conical in shape, and a singular germ pore through which future germination will occur.

== Growth ==
Growth of the fungus on corn meal agar is slow, with only 7-8 millimeters of growth observed after 1 month. The hyphae, or filamentous strands, that characterize the vegetative phase of the fungus become funiculose, weaving together to form rope-like strands. Sparse white aerial hyphae can also develop as the fungus is cultured.

Ordinarily, the teleomorph, or sexual stage, of P. appendiculata can be difficult to obtain in vitro. However, perithecial development can be stimulated through the addition of steam-sterilized rabbit dung to the corn meal agar plate. The developmental process is still slow, with 4 months needed for growth, but the perithecia obtained with steam-sterilized dung in vitro are identical morphologically to those obtained from the wild.

While its violaceous colouring is already reminiscent of species belonging to the genus Cercophora, Podospora appendiculata bears further similarity to Cercophora in that its spores are able to germinate in their hyaline, immature phase. Although spores are never naturally released when immature, such a feature is still highly unusual among species belonging to the genus Podospora, with only the spores of P. fimiseda being similarly capable.

== Production of antimicrobial compounds ==
Coprophilous fungi have been known to competitively interfere with other fungi, producing chemical agents that impair the ability of rival species to access resources. There is evidence to suggest that slower-growing fungi, such as Poronia punctata, employ antagonistic strategies more often in order to hamper the reproductive potential of quicker-growing fungi in dung. Podospora appendiculata, itself a slow-growing fungus, has likewise been shown to produce three molecules with antimicrobial properties: Appenolide A, Appenolide B, and Appenolide C. Each molecule is a 2(5H)-furanone.
