= Zopfiella ebriosa =

Scientific classification
- Kingdom: Fungi
- Division: Ascomycota
- Class: Sordariomycetes
- Order: Sordariales
- Family: Lasiosphaeriaceae
- Genus: Zopfiella
- Species: Z. ebriosa

Binomial name
- Zopfiella ebriosa J. Guarro (1991)

Synonyms
- Rosellinia cellarum Lambotte (1880)

Species of fungus

Zopfiella ebriosa is a harmless fungus discovered covering the corks of wine bottles in 1991 in Tarragona, Spain. A member of the division Ascomycota, Zopfiella ebriosa is characterized by small and asymmetrical asci, presence of ostioles, and possession of germ slits.

== History and taxonomy ==
This fungus' species epithet ebriosa from the Latin word meaning "habitually drunk" is likely attributed due to the presence of seemingly random colouration and asymmetrical shape of its asci. The species was incorrectly described to be Zopfiella flammifera - a coprophilous fungus found in Nigerian soil as well as another coprophilous fungus Podospora minicauda that is located on herbivore dung described by Locquin-Linard. Zopfiella ebriosa was eventually attributed its own species name due to its expression of comparatively much smaller and lopsided ascospores. Although this fungus has been discovered numerous times, two mycologists independently examined the fungus' history by looking at fungal records of Quercus suber bark and other cork substrates before collaborating on a paper summarizing the genus Zopfiella. A possible previous name given to this fungus may have been Rosellinia cellarum attributed to Lambotte who composed many studies in late 19th century Belgian wine cellars. Lambotte originally placed R. cellarum into the family Xylariaceae which is a family baring some resemblance to Z. ebriosa.

== Growth and morphology ==
The ascospores of Z. ebriosa are smaller than average for the family Xylariaceae, despite exhibiting a similar inequilateral or asymmetrical property. Z. ebriosa exhibits clear ascospores similar to those of Xyliariaceae, however, contrary to the family Xylariaceae possessing a germ pore, a germ slit is found in Z. ebriosa. This lack of germ pores poses a question of their association with the genus Zopfiella which most typically have pores at or near the apex of the spore. The morphology of Z. ebriosa is described extensively by Guarro et al in their collaborative paper on the genus Zopfiella. The fungus' imperfectly globose ascomata range from 180-300 μm in diameter containing a short broad neck and express strong pigmentation in the upper region. Their two-celled ascospores are arranged uniseriately with one cell conspicuously bulging featuring dark brown patches. The authors did not observe an asexual or anamorphic state, however the sexual colonies grow very slowly on cherry decoction agar, reaching 50 mm after 30 days at 21 °C with no growth found when placed in the same medium at 30 °C. Z. ebriosa also exhibit cylindrical asci and contain ostioles atypical of the Zopfiella however, within the species, variation has been found when discussing ostiole presence. All samples of the species contained ascomata that are ostiolate when placed on natural substrates that was paired with active release of spores from asci. Conversely, in culture, ascomata of Z. ebriosa can be cleistothecial and asci deliquesce (or liquify) to release spores. Despite glaring differences from typical Zopfiella species, the researchers decided it would be premature to create a new genus strictly containing this fungus with the limited information available to them about it.

== Habitat ==
As of 1991, this fungus has only been found on wine corks, which may originate from the natural bark of the cork oak having survived the sterilization processes needed to form bottle stoppers. Despite being found on the corks of unopened bottles, the quality of the wine was not hindered in any way. Zopfiella ebriosa seems to have an affinity for high-quality wines potentially due to the stoppers found in cheaper wines being composed of granulated/re-formed cork which can be hypothesized to contain anti-fungal spore capabilities due to the manufacturing process of the cork.
