= Podospora macrodecipiens =

Scientific classification
- Domain: Eukaryota
- Kingdom: Fungi
- Division: Ascomycota
- Class: Sordariomycetes
- Order: Sordariales
- Family: Podosporaceae
- Genus: Podospora
- Species: P. macrodecipiens

Binomial name
- Podospora macrodecipiens M.J.Richardson (2008)

Species of fungus

Podospora macrodecipiens is a species of coprophilous (dung-loving) fungus in the family Podosporaceae. It was discovered in Antiparos in Greece, where it was found growing on sheep dung.

== Taxonomy ==
Podospora macrodecipiens was formally described by the mycologist Michael J. Richardson in 2008, following the collection and incubation of dung samples from various Greek Aegean islands. The species name macrodecipiens is derived from the Greek prefix "macro-", meaning large, and refers explicitly to the significantly larger spores compared to the closely related species, Podospora decipiens. Richardson established the new species after examining material that consistently exhibited larger spores than those previously known in this genus. The type specimen was collected on sheep dung from Antiparos, and additional specimens considered as paratypes were obtained from other islands, including Naxos, Crete, and Kos.

== Description ==
Podospora macrodecipiens is found predominantly growing on the dung of herbivorous animals. The species is similar in many ways to the closely related Podospora decipiens but can be distinguished primarily by its distinctly larger spores. The spores of P. macrodecipiens typically measure between 51–58 μm in length and 22.5–27.3 μm in width, which is significantly larger compared to those of P. decipiens.

The fungus produces dark-coloured perithecia, which are small flask-shaped fruiting bodies partially embedded within the dung substrate. These perithecia contain cylindrical asci—structures that house the spores—which usually hold eight spores each. The mature spores are dark-coloured and possess distinctive appendages that aid in their dispersal. Specifically, each spore features a long, thread-like appendage at the top, as well as at the base of a short stalk called the pedicel.
