= Podospora pleiospora =

Scientific classification
- Domain: Eukaryota
- Kingdom: Fungi
- Division: Ascomycota
- Class: Sordariomycetes
- Order: Sordariales
- Family: Podosporaceae
- Genus: Podospora
- Species: P. pleiospora

Binomial name
- Podospora pleiospora (G.Winter) Niessl

Species of fungi

Podospora pleiospora is a species of coprophilous fungus in the family Podosporaceae. It is especially common on the islands around Greece, where it grows on the dung of goats and sheep.
