= Thaxteria =

Scientific classification
- Kingdom: Fungi
- Division: Ascomycota
- Class: Sordariomycetes
- Order: Sordariales
- Family: Lasiosphaeriaceae
- Genus: Thaxteria; Sacc.

Type species
- Thaxteria kunckelii Giard

Genus of fungi

Thaxteria is a genus of fungi within the Lasiosphaeriaceae family.
