= Cercophora =

Cercophora may refer to:

- Cercophora (moth), a genus of moth in the family Erebidae
- Cercophora (fungus), a genus of fungi in the family Lasiosphaeriaceae
- Cercophora (hexapod), a clade of Hexapoda
