= Periamphispora =

Scientific classification
- Kingdom: Fungi
- Division: Ascomycota
- Class: Sordariomycetes
- Order: Sordariales
- Family: Neoschizotheciaceae
- Genus: Periamphispora; J.C. Krug

Type species
- Periamphispora phacelodes J.C. Krug

Genus of fungi

Periamphispora is a genus of fungi within the Lasiosphaeriaceae family. This is a monotypic genus, containing the single species Periamphispora phacelodes.
