= Lacunospora =

Scientific classification
- Kingdom: Fungi
- Division: Ascomycota
- Class: Sordariomycetes
- Order: Sordariales
- Family: Lasiosphaeriaceae
- Genus: Lacunospora; Cailleux

Genus of fungi

Lacunospora is a lichenized genus of fungi within the Lasiosphaeriaceae family.
