= Arniella =

Scientific classification
- Kingdom: Fungi
- Division: Ascomycota
- Class: Sordariomycetes
- Order: Sordariales
- Family: Lasiosphaeriaceae
- Genus: Arniella; Jeng & J.C. Krug

Type species
- Arniella echoura Jeng & J.C. Krug

Species
- A. echoura A. polycercia

Genus of fungi

Arniella is a genus of fungi within the Lasiosphaeriaceae family.
