= Pseudocercophora =

Scientific classification
- Kingdom: Fungi
- Division: Ascomycota
- Class: Sordariomycetes
- Order: Sordariales
- Family: Lasiosphaeriaceae
- Genus: Pseudocercophora; Subram. & Sekar

Type species
- Pseudocercophora ingoldii Subram. & Sekar

Genus of fungi

Pseudocercophora is a genus of fungi within the Lasiosphaeriaceae family. This is a monotypic genus, containing the single species Pseudocercophora ingoldii.
