= Apiosordaria =

Scientific classification
- Kingdom: Fungi
- Division: Ascomycota
- Class: Sordariomycetes
- Order: Sordariales
- Family: Lasiosphaeriaceae
- Genus: Apiosordaria; Arx & W.Gams

Type species
- Apiosordaria verruculosa (C.N. Jensen) Arx & W. Gams

Genus of fungi

Apiosordaria is a genus of fungi within the Lasiosphaeriaceae family.
