= Plagiosphaera =

Scientific classification
- Kingdom: Fungi
- Division: Ascomycota
- Class: Sordariomycetes
- Order: incertae sedis
- Family: incertae sedis
- Genus: Plagiosphaera; Petr.

Type species
- Plagiosphaera moravica (Petr.) Petr.

Genus of fungi

Plagiosphaera is a genus of fungi in the Sordariomycetes class (subclass Sordariomycetidae) of the Ascomycota. The relationship of this taxon to other taxa within the class is unknown (incertae sedis), and it has not yet been placed with certainty into any order or family.
