= Eosphaeria =

Scientific classification
- Kingdom: Fungi
- Division: Ascomycota
- Class: Sordariomycetes
- Order: Sordariales
- Family: Lasiosphaeriaceae
- Genus: Eosphaeria; Höhn.

Type species
- Eosphaeria uliginosa (Fr.) Höhn.

Genus of fungi

Eosphaeria is a genus of fungi within the Lasiosphaeriaceae family. This is a monotypic genus, containing the single species Eosphaeria uliginosa.
