= Emblemospora =

Scientific classification
- Kingdom: Fungi
- Division: Ascomycota
- Class: Sordariomycetes
- Order: Sordariales
- Family: Lasiosphaeriaceae
- Genus: Emblemospora; Jeng & J.C. Krug

Type species
- Emblemospora monotrema Jeng & J.C. Krug

Genus of fungi

Emblemospora is a genus of fungi within the Lasiosphaeriaceae family.
