= Bombardia =

Scientific classification
- Kingdom: Fungi
- Division: Ascomycota
- Class: Sordariomycetes
- Order: Sordariales
- Family: Lasiosphaeriaceae
- Genus: Bombardia (Fr.) P. Karst.

Type species
- Bombardia fasciculata Fr.

Genus of fungi

Bombardia is a genus of fungi within the Lasiosphaeriaceae family.
