= Tripterosporella =

Scientific classification
- Kingdom: Fungi
- Division: Ascomycota
- Class: Sordariomycetes
- Order: Sordariales
- Family: Lasiosphaeriaceae
- Genus: Tripterosporella; Subram. & Lodha

Type species
- Tripterosporella coprophila Subram. & Lodha

Genus of fungi

Tripterosporella is a genus of fungi within the Lasiosphaeriaceae family.
