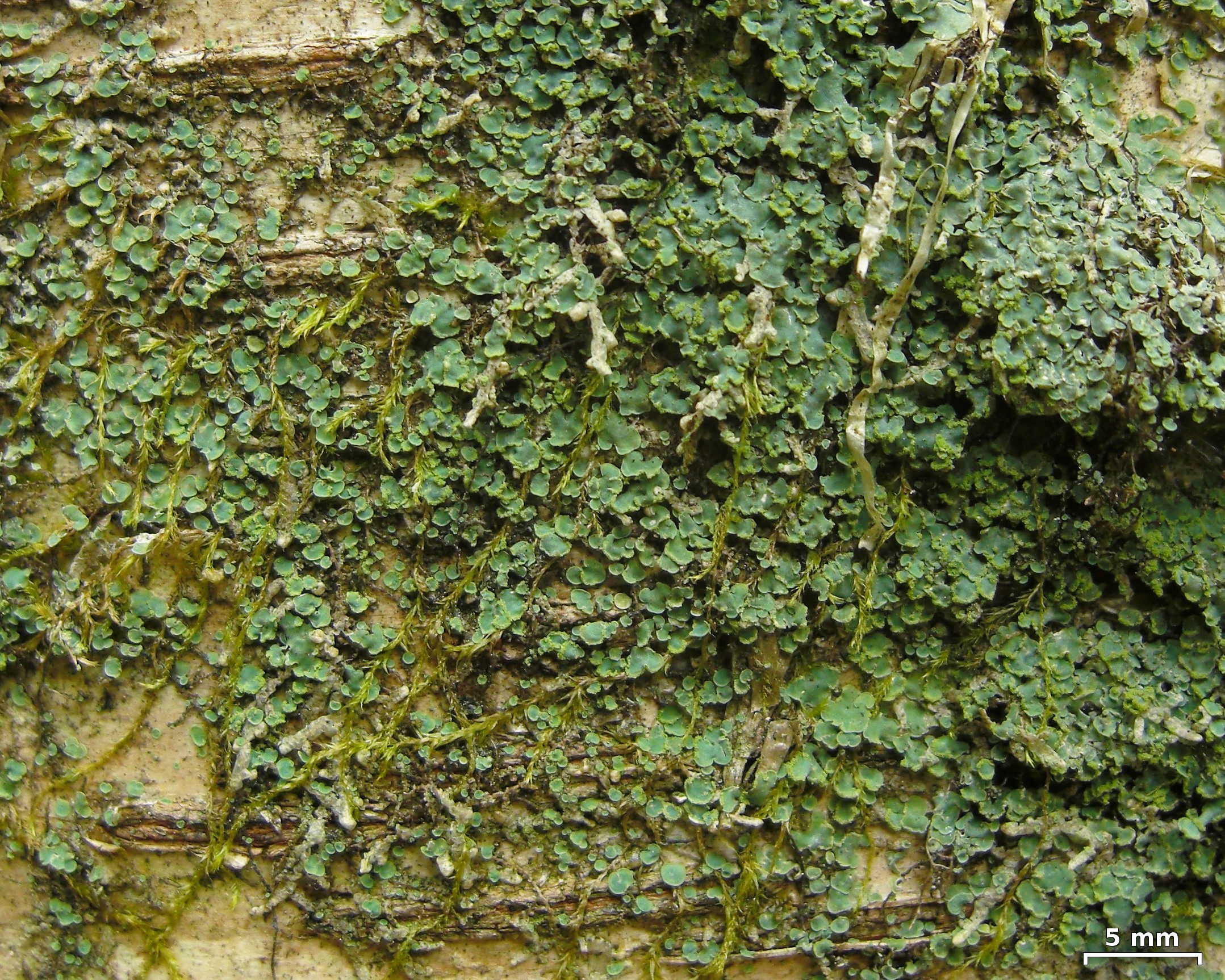
- Normandina pulchella

Scientific classification
- Kingdom: Fungi
- Division: Ascomycota
- Class: Eurotiomycetes
- Order: Verrucariales
- Family: Verrucariaceae
- Genus: Normandina; Nyl. (1855)

Type species
- Normandina jungermanniae (Nyl.) Nyl. (1855)

Species
- N. acroglypta N. chlorococca N. dictyospora N. pulchella N. simodensis

Synonyms
- Lauderlindsaya J.C.David & D.Hawksw. (1989); Lenormandia Delise (1841); Normandinomyces Cif. & Tomas. (1953)

= Normandina =

Genus of lichens

Normandina is a genus of lichen-forming fungi in the family Verrucariaceae. It has five species of crustose and squamulose (scaly) lichens.

== Taxonomy ==
The genus was circumscribed by William Nylander in 1855, with Normandina jungermanniae as the type species; that name is now treated as a synonym of N. pulchella. Nylander's generic concept has had a tangled history, in part because the green, often sterile thallus (the lichen body) and the flask-shaped fruiting bodies (perithecioid ascomata) were, for a time, thought to belong to different fungi.

In the late 19th and 20th centuries several segregate names were introduced for material now placed in Normandina. Delise's Lenormandia (1841) referred to the same organism but is an invalid, later-homonymous name; Ciferri and Tomaselli (1953) coined Normandinomyces for the perithecioid stage; and David and Hawksworth (1989) proposed Lauderlindsaya for a supposed lichenicolous fungus on N. pulchella. This splitting was encouraged by the view that the green thallus belonged with the basidiomycetes and that the perithecioid structures were those of Sphaerulina/Mycosphaerella (Dothideales). Subsequent work showed that the perithecioid ascomata are produced by Normandina itself, and that Lauderlindsaya and Normandinomyces represent the fertile form of the same lichen and are best treated as synonyms of Normandina.

Aptroot's taxonomic review assembled the full synonymy and stabilised the modern usage: Normandina is a member of the Verrucariales (family Verrucariaceae), and it includes mostly bark-dwelling species with transversely septate spores—many of which had been described earlier in Thelidium. Recent higher-level classifications continue to place the genus in Verrucariaceae.

== Species ==
- Normandina acroglypta (Norman) Aptroot (1995) – Europe
- Normandina chlorococca (Leight.) Orange (2022) – Northern Europe
- Normandina dictyospora Orange (2022) – Falkland Islands
- Normandina pulchella (Borrer) Nyl. (1861)
- Normandina simodensis (Asahina) Aptroot (1991)
