= Apodospora =

Scientific classification
- Kingdom: Fungi
- Division: Ascomycota
- Class: Sordariomycetes
- Order: Sordariales
- Family: Bombardiaceae
- Genus: Apodospora; Cain & J.H. Mirza

Type species
- Apodospora simulans Cain & J.H. Mirza

Genus of fungi

Apodospora is a genus of fungi, formerly within the Lasiosphaeriaceae family. As on 2020, it was placed in the Bombardiaceae family.

== Species ==
As accepted by Species Fungorum;

- Apodospora bulgarica Fakirova (1973)
- Apodospora gotlandica N. Lundq. (1972)
- Apodospora peruviana T. Muroi, Udagawa & Y. Otani (1987)
- Apodospora simulans Cain & J.H. Mirza (1970)
- Apodospora thescelina Cain & Mirza (1970)
- Apodospora viridis Cain & J.H. Mirza (1970)
