= Jugulospora =

Scientific classification
- Kingdom: Fungi
- Division: Ascomycota
- Class: Sordariomycetes
- Order: Sordariales
- Family: Lasiosphaeriaceae
- Genus: Jugulospora; N. Lundq.

Type species
- Jugulospora rotula (Cooke) N. Lundq. (1972)

Genus of fungi

Jugulospora is a genus of fungi that was placed within the Lasiosphaeriaceae family, It was then moved into the Neoschizotheciaceae family. This was thought to be a monotypic genus, containing the single species Jugulospora rotula, until more species were found.

== Species ==
As accepted by Species Fungorum;

- Jugulospora antarctica (Stchigel & Guarro) Y. Marín & Stchigel (2020)
- Jugulospora carbonaria (W. Phillips & Plowr.) Y. Marín, Stchigel, Guarro & A.N. Mill. (2020)
- Jugulospora minor (N. Lundq.) S.K. Huang & K.D. Hyde (2021)
- Jugulospora rotula (Cooke) N. Lundq. (1972)
- Jugulospora vestita (Udagawa & Y. Horie) Y. Marín & Stchigel (2020)
