= Mycomedusiospora =

Scientific classification
- Kingdom: Fungi
- Division: Ascomycota
- Class: Sordariomycetes
- Order: incertae sedis
- Genus: Mycomedusiospora; G.C.Carroll & Munk (1964)

Type species
- Mycomedusiospora flavida (Rick) G.C.Carroll & Munk (1964)

Genus of fungi

Mycomedusiospora is a fungal genus in the Sordariomycetes class (subclass Sordariomycetidae) of the Ascomycota. The relationship of this taxon to other taxa within the class is unknown (incertae sedis), and it has not yet been placed with certainty into any order or family. This is a monotypic genus, containing the single species Mycomedusiospora flavida.
