= Zygopleurage =

Scientific classification
- Kingdom: Fungi
- Division: Ascomycota
- Class: Sordariomycetes
- Order: Sordariales
- Family: Neoschizotheciaceae
- Genus: Zygopleurage; Boedijn (1962)

Type species
- Zygopleurage zygospora (Speg.) Boedijn (1962)

Genus of fungi

Zygopleurage is a genus of fungi, that was placed within the family Lasiosphaeriaceae, until later analysis placed it within the Neoschizotheciaceae.

== Species ==
As accepted by Species Fungorum; Zygopleurage albiziae(Syd. & P. Syd.) Arx (1962)

- Zygopleurage faiyumensis N. Lundq. (1969)
- Zygopleurage multicaudata Mirza (1968)
- Zygopleurage zygospora (Speg.) Boedijn (1962)
