= Apodus =

Scientific classification
- Kingdom: Fungi
- Division: Ascomycota
- Class: Sordariomycetes
- Order: Sordariales
- Family: Neoschizotheciaceae
- Genus: Apodus; Malloch & Cain

Type species
- Apodus deciduus Malloch & Cain

Genus of fungi

Apodus is a genus of fungi that was originally placed within the Lasiosphaeriaceae family. In 2020 it was placed within the Neoschizotheciaceae family.

== Species ==
As accepted by Species Fungorum;

- Apodus deciduus Malloch & Cain (1971)
- Apodus oryzae Carolis & Arx (1975)
