= Diplogelasinospora =

Scientific classification
- Kingdom: Fungi
- Division: Ascomycota
- Class: Sordariomycetes
- Order: Sordariales
- Family: Lasiosphaeriaceae
- Genus: Diplogelasinospora; Cain

Type species
- Diplogelasinospora princeps Cain

Genus of fungi

Diplogelasinospora is a genus of fungi within the Lasiosphaeriaceae family.
