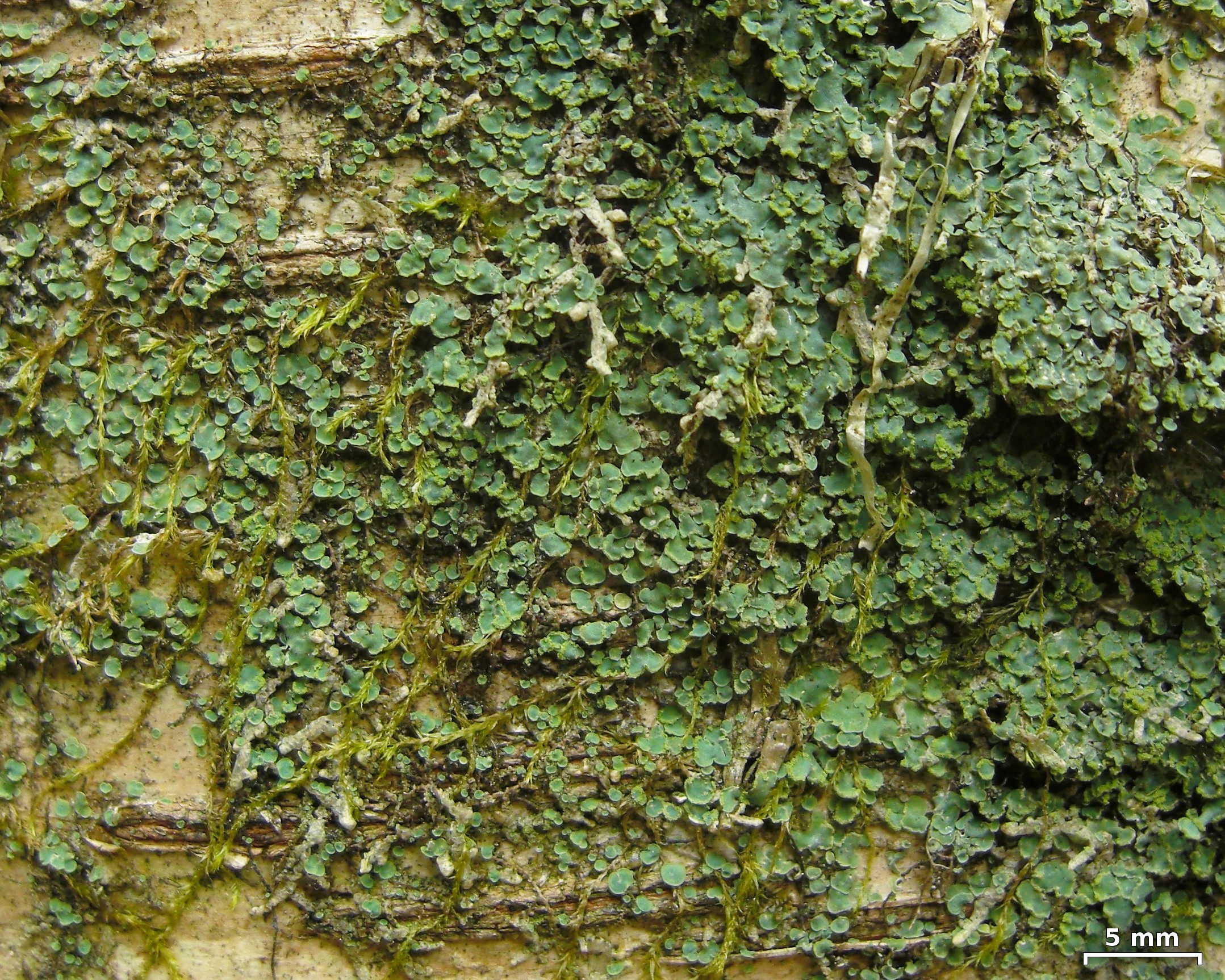

Conservation status
- Apparently Secure (NatureServe)

Scientific classification
- Kingdom: Fungi
- Division: Ascomycota
- Class: Eurotiomycetes
- Order: Verrucariales
- Family: Verrucariaceae
- Genus: Normandina
- Species: N. pulchella

Binomial name
- Normandina pulchella (Borrer) Nyl. (1861)

Synonyms
- Endocarpon pulchellum Borrer (1831); Verrucaria pulchella Borrer (1831); Coccocarpia pulchella (Borrer) C.Bab. (1855); Lenormandia jungermanniae Nyl. (1855); Normandina jungermanniae (Nyl.) Nyl. (1855); Lenormandia pulchella (Borrer) A.Massal. (1856)

= Normandina pulchella =

Species of lichen

Normandina pulchella, commonly known as the elf-ear lichen or blue heart, is a species of squamulose lichen in the family Verrucariaceae. This cosmopolitan species is widely distributed across both hemispheres, where it thrives in moist microhabitats. It favours moss-covered deciduous trees and rocks, often colonising over mosses and bryophytes. It occasionally grows on bare bark and on other lichens. Distinctive features of N. pulchella include its bluish-green squamules (scales) with sharply raised margins, non-reactivity to standard chemical spot tests, and growth in humid habitats. Initially, Nannochloris normandinae, a green alga, was thought to be its photobiont. More recent studies, however, have revised this understanding, with Diplosphaera chodatii now recognised as the algal partner.

First named and scientifically described by the English botanist William Borrer in 1831, the clarification of Normandina pulchella's place within the Verrucariaceae, facilitated by molecular phylogenetics analysis in 2010, resolved long-standing taxonomic uncertainties. Prior classifications had varied widely, placing N. pulchella within groups such as the Basidiomycota (i.e., as a basidiolichen) and Fungi incertae sedis, largely due to differing interpretations of the perithecia (fruiting bodies) found within the lichen. These discrepancies stemmed from confusion over whether the perithecia belonged to the lichen itself or were instead associated with a parasitic lichenicolous fungus.

== Systematics ==
=== Taxonomic history ===
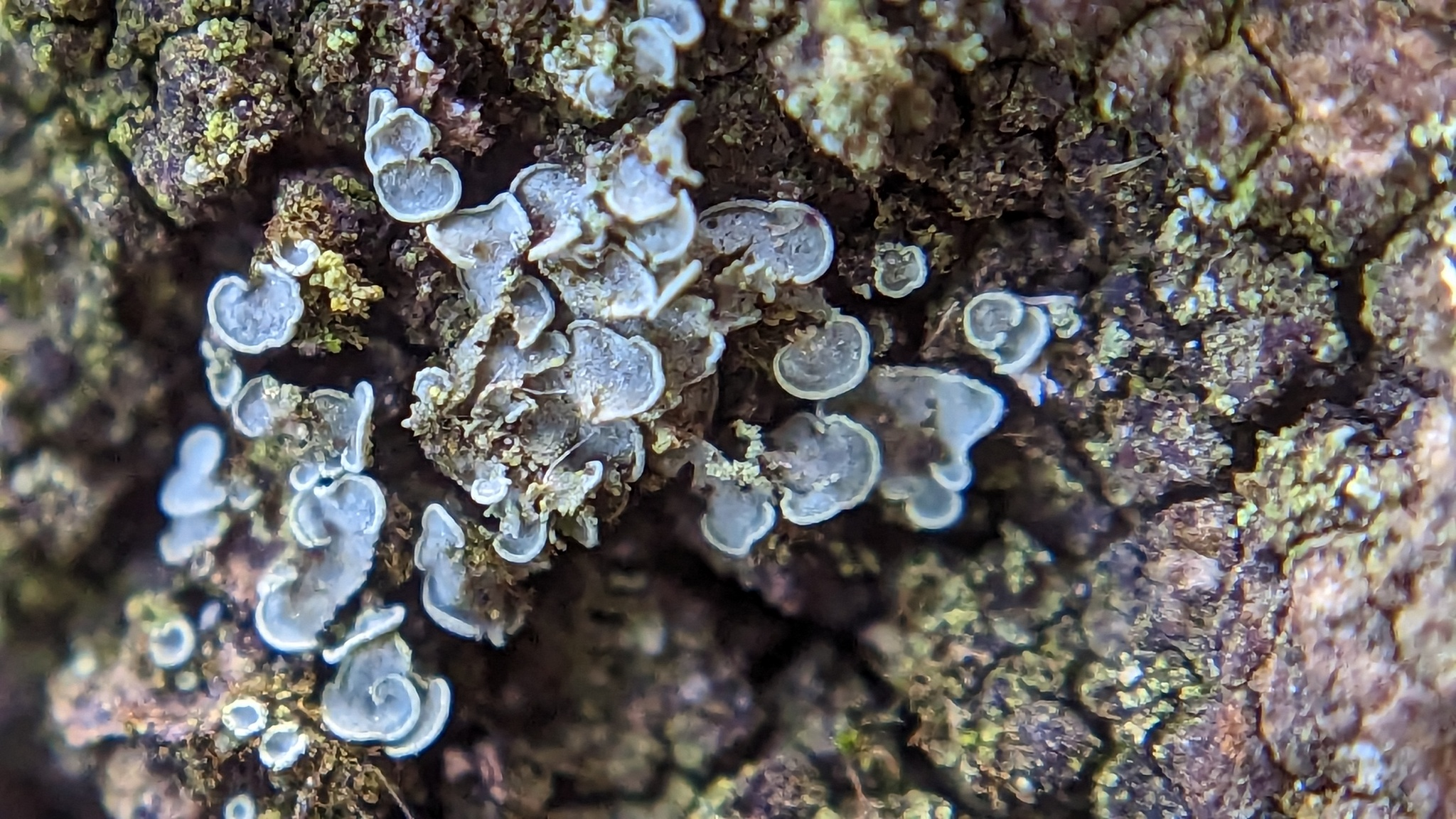
Lobes with bluish colouration

The lichen was originally formally described in 1831 by the English botanist William Borrer, who classified it within the genus Verrucaria. He coined the vernacular name "little filmy-leaved Verrucaria" due to its distinctive morphology. The specific epithet pulchella is the Latin diminutive of pulchra, 'beautiful' or 'fair'. He observed the lichen to be characterised by thin, membranous, greenish-grey, leaf-like scales, with these features transitioning from smooth, rounded forms to crowded, waved, and lobed configurations, whilst adorned with powdery granules. The underside of these scales is distinguished by a pale brown colour and woolly fibres. Borrer described the lichen's tubercles as nearly globular and black. These tubercles reveal only their apex through the thallus surface, exposing a gelatinous, brownish nucleus with a central pore. He noted the lichen's frequent occurrence on mossy trees in Sussex, and that it thrived on the leafy liverwort species Jungermannia dilatata, forming wide but often interrupted patches. Ellen Hutchins was credited by Borrer for initially discovering the species on a mountain near Bantry (Ireland), growing on Lichen plumbeus on heath stems. He remarked on the lichen's uniqueness:

This curious little production is so unlike to every other Lichen, that its very genus must have remained doubtful but for Miss Hutchins's fortunate discovery of the tubercles. Acharius, to whom Sussex specimens were communicated, thought it a Thelephora, thus excluding it even from the natural order to which we hold it to belong.

Despite its prevalence in Sussex, Borrer mentioned that it appeared to have been overlooked elsewhere. In another publication that year, Borrer proposed to transfer it to the genus Endocarpon. However, this was nomenclaturally invalid because the name had already been for a different species, violating the International Code of Botanical Nomenclature guidelines. The Finnish taxonomist William Nylander transferred the taxon to the genus Normandina in 1861.

=== Classification ===
The taxonomic placement of N. pulchella was subject to significant debate among lichenologists for many decades. Although the lichen produces ascospores, the origin of these spores and their associated structures was historically contentious. Prior to molecular studies, researchers proposed various classifications, including placement within the Basidiomycota due to morphological similarities with certain basidiolichens, particularly Coriscium viride, associated with the basidiomycete Lichenomphalia hudsoniana. The central controversy stemmed from perithecia found within the thallus, which were later attributed to the parasitic fungus Sphaerulina chlorococca rather than to N. pulchella itself. Some researchers considered these structures to be the lichen's own reproductive organs, while others interpreted them as belonging to a parasitic fungus. The discovery that Normandina lacks dolipore septa — a key feature of basidiomycetes — cast doubt on its classification as a basidiolichen, but its exact systematic position remained unclear until 2010, when molecular phylogenetics analysis definitively established its position within the Verrucariaceae. This classification was further supported by the presence of features typical of ascomycetes, such as Woronin bodies and simple perforated septa.

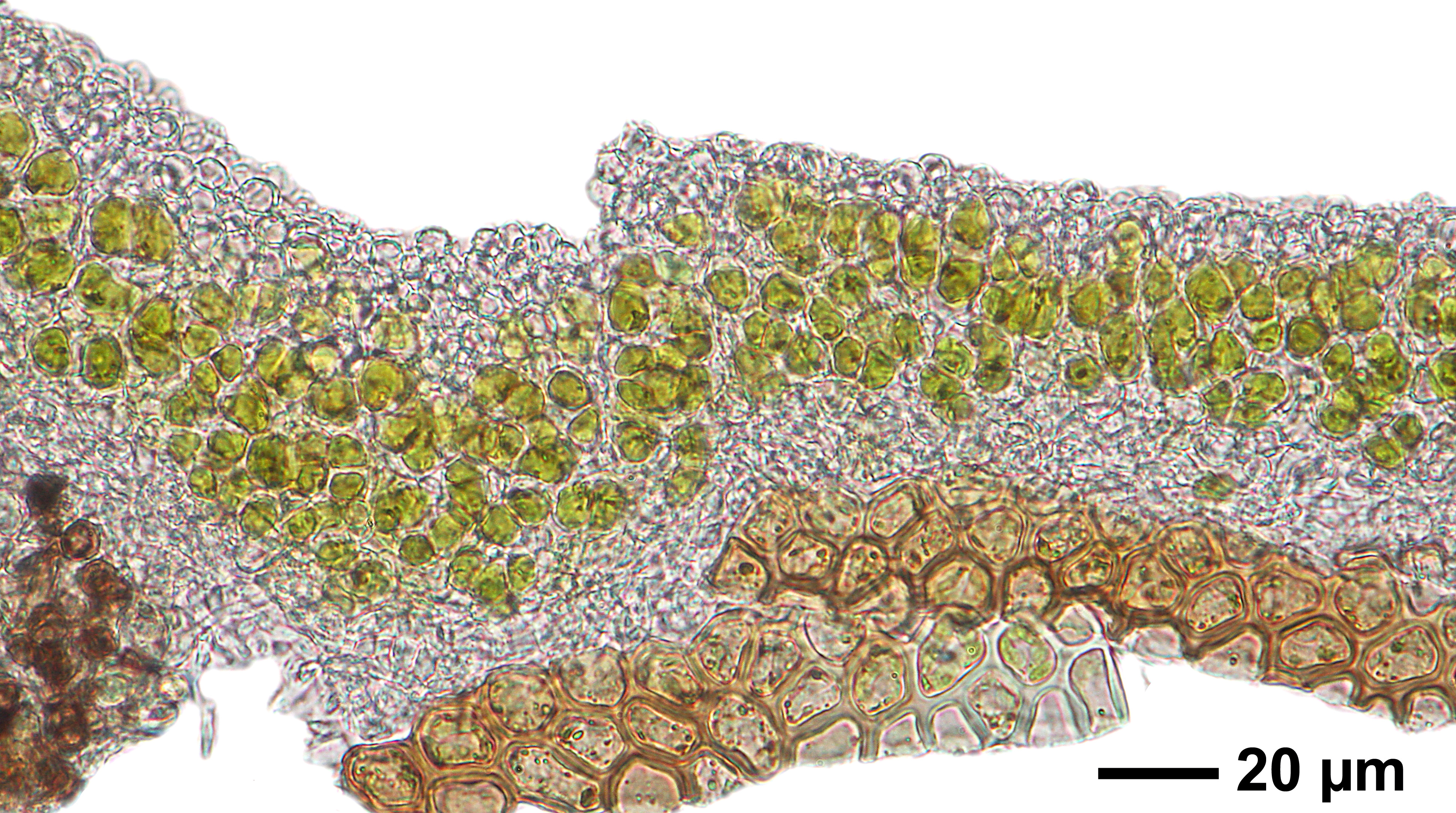
Microscopic cross section of a Normandina pulchella lobe illustrating its layered (heteromerous) structure

A cytological study revealed that N. pulchella has a heteromerous thallus, where the fungal and algal components are organised into distinct layers. This structure plays a key role in its life processes, distinguishing it from basidiolichens. Specifically, the medulla, or inner layer, contains hyaline (transparent) fungal filaments entwined around small clusters of algal cells. These cells have thick walls and a singular, lobate chloroplast containing a distinct metameric pyrenoid – a structure assisting in starch formation, along with small starch grains and fat-containing plastoglobuli.

The fungal partner, or mycobiont, was found to have hyphae featuring simple perforated septa, a type of internal cell division within the hyphae, accompanied by Woronin bodies – organelles unique to ascomycetes, a large fungal group. Additionally, the close yet non-invasive relationship between the fungal and algal cells suggested a mutualistic association typical of ascolichens. This cytological evidence, along with the 2010 molecular phylogenetics analysis by Lucia Muggia and colleagues, conclusively established N. pulchella's position within the family Verrucariaceae.

=== Common names ===
In addition to Borrer's original suggestion ("little filmy-leaved Verrucaria"), other vernacular names that have been used to refer to this lichen are "blue heart", and "elf ear lichen".

== Description ==
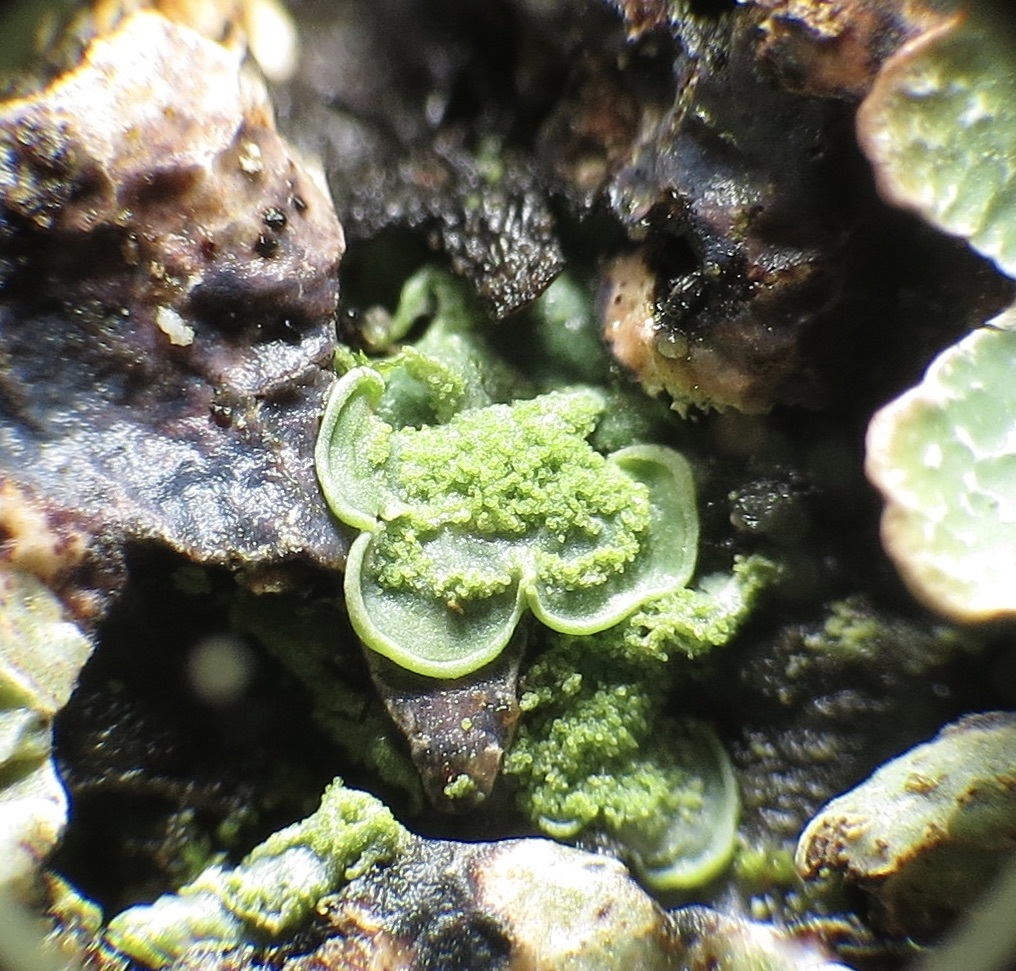
Close-up of sorediate lobes

Normandina pulchella has a squamulose (scaly) thallus, composed of small, scale-like formations termed squamules. The squamules display colours ranging from glaucous—a bluish-green or grey—to pale grey or greenish-grey, intensifying to a richer green when moistened. Each squamule can span up to 5 mm across and may include one or more broadly rounded lobes, each up to 1.7 mm in diameter, reminiscent of shell or ear shapes. The upper surface of these lobes features concentric ridges, while the edges are sharply defined and raised, typically spanning 50–100 micrometres (μm) in width. The squamules may be dispersed or densely packed across the lichen's surface. The thallus is closely appressed to the substrate. Internally, the thallus shows a heteromerous structure, with distinct layering of fungal and algal components. The medulla contains transparent fungal filaments that form a network around clusters of algal cells. These fungal hyphae feature simple perforated septa with distinctive Woronin bodies, while the algal cells are characterised by thick cell walls and single lobate chloroplasts containing pyrenoids.

For vegetative reproduction, N. pulchella develops soralia—structures on the lobe surfaces and edges—that discharge granular particles known as soredia. These soralia are green or match the colour of the lobes and contain granular soredia measuring 40–80 μm in diameter. The underside of the lichen presents a whitish, slightly felted (tomentose) appearance and adheres to its substrate through numerous fungal strands, or hyphae. Rhizines do not occur in this species.

Zeorin is the only lichen product that occurs in Normandina pulchella.

Its spore-producing structures, or ascomata, appear as semi-immersed globular to slightly conical perithecia with moderate orange-brown pigmentation in the wall of textura angularis. They are characterised by abundant periphyses, absence of paraphyses and hymenial algae, and an I+ red/KI+ blue hymenial gel. They resemble those in related species but are distinguished by their uniformly pigmented, cohesive nature under microscopic analysis. The ascospores are typically 29–37 by 6–7 μm, mostly with seven internal partitions, known as septa, though some specimens show predominantly (4–5)-septate spores measuring 17–29 by 5–7 μm. Chemical analysis, particularly thin-layer chromatography, identify zeorin as a secondary metabolite (lichen product), yet N. pulchella remains unresponsive to standard chemical spot tests.

=== Similar species ===
The squamules of Lichenomphalina hudsoniana share the neat, sharply defined edges characteristic of N. pulchella. However, they can be distinguished by their lack of soralia, the presence of both upper and lower cortices, and adaptation to arctic-alpine environments, typically growing on peaty soil or decaying wood. In contrast, N. pulchella tends to develop more pronounced soralia in shaded, humid settings, diverging from the preferred habitats of Lichenomphalina hudsoniana. Additionally, the fruiting bodies of N. pulchella are found to be more prevalent and larger in tropical regions compared to temperate ones, and they often do not contain soredia. This suggests that environmental factors or underlying taxonomic differences may influence the observed variations between these species in different locales.

== Photobiont ==
In 1981, Elisabeth Tschermak-Woess identified Nannochloris normandinae as the photobiont partner, the algae associated with Normandina pulchella. Subsequent studies, however, have been less definitive about the role of Nannochloris. By 2011, research by Thüs and colleagues revealed that Diplosphaera, not Nannochloris, was present in ten examined Normandina specimens. In 2020, Pröschold and Darienko demonstrated that Nannochloris normandinae is actually synonymous with Diplosphaera chodatii of the order Prasiolales, resolving the apparent conflict in previous studies and confirming D. chodatii as the photobiont of N. pulchella.

== Habitat and distribution ==
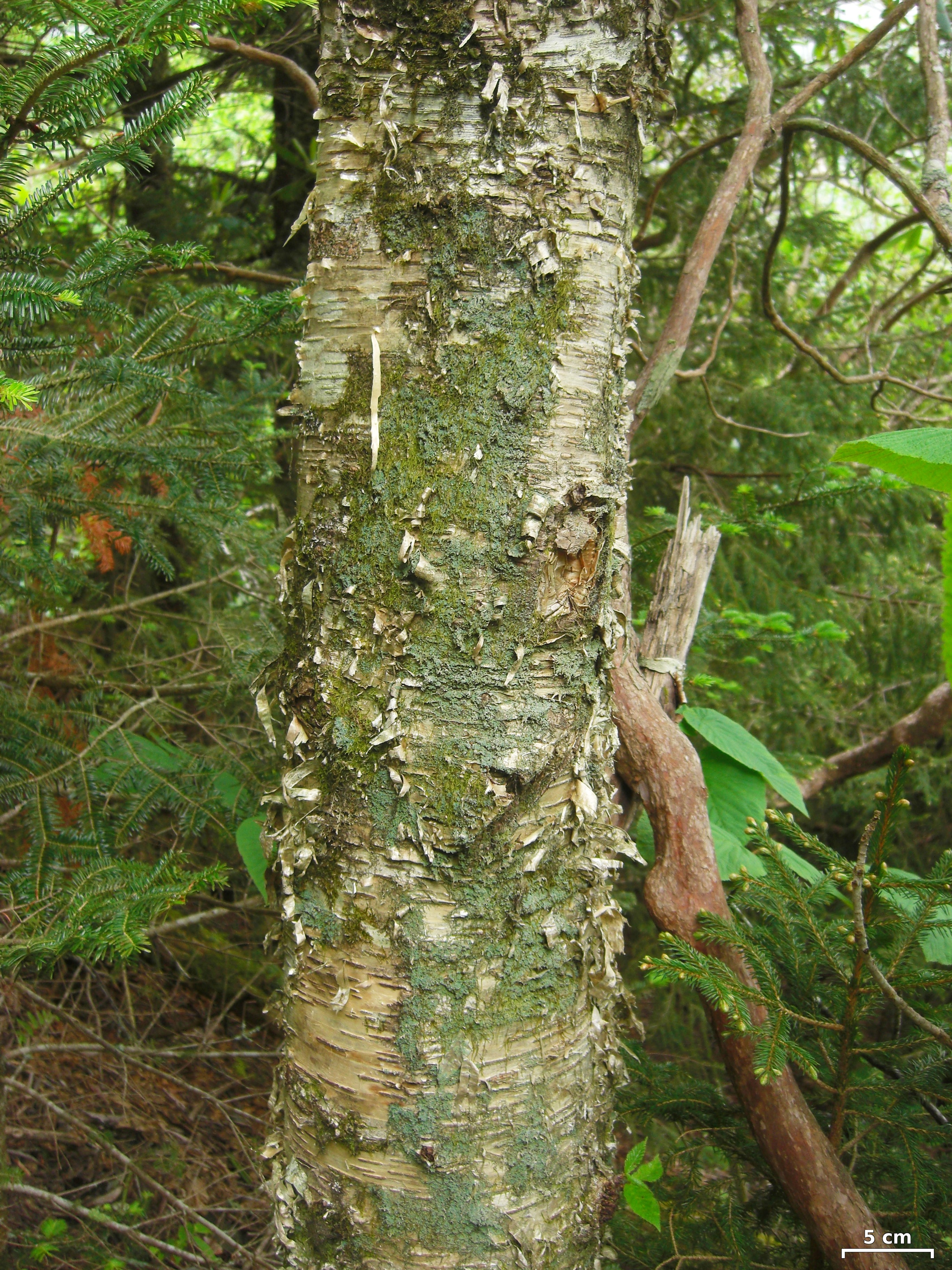
Normandina pulchella growing amongst moss on tree bark

Normandina pulchella has a cosmopolitan distribution, growing across diverse climates and regions. The Swedish lichenologist Gunnar Degelius, in his 1934 phytogeographical study, highlights the species' oceanic distribution in Europe. It predominantly occupies coastal areas in Northern Europe, including Scandinavia and the British Isles, and extends to both coastal and montane regions in Austria, Bavaria, France, Czechoslovakia (now the Czech Republic and Slovakia), and select Mediterranean locales. In contrast, William Louis Culberson and Mason Hale's 1966 analysis of its North American presence noted its prevalence in the mountainous western regions and the Appalachian foothills, without indicating an oceanic distribution pattern. Its range in North America extends north to Alaska, although in 2022 Alan Orange showed that some collections from there represent a different species found in the Americas, provisionally named N. 'americana'.

Ecologically, Normandina pulchella favours moss-covered deciduous trees and rocks within woodlands and parks, often colonising over mosses, bryophytes, and occasionally bare bark. It also often grows on other lichens, particularly those that contain cyanobacteria, such as Fuscopannaria, Pannaria, Parmeliella, Pectenia, and Peltigera. Its presence is increasing in southern and western Britain and throughout Ireland, reflecting a broadening distribution.

It is listed as a vulnerable species in the Finnish Regional Red List because of its small known population.

== Species interactions ==
Among the lichenicolous (lichen-dwelling) fungi specifically associated with N. pulchella are several species that have unique interactions. Capronia normandinae is characterised by its black, superficial, hair-like structures known as setose perithecia. Cladophialophora normandinae is distinguished by its black fruiting bodies, termed sporodochia, which play a role in its reproductive cycle. Additionally, Tremella normandinae is noted for producing pale, swollen growths, referred to as galls, indicative of its parasitic relationship with the lichen. Another parasite, Globosphaeria jamesii, also interacts with Normandina pulchella.

Lawreymyces pulchellae is a fungus that lives hidden within Normandina pulchella tissues, one of several recently discovered cryptic basidiomycete-lichen associations. Described in 2017 as part of the family Corticiaceae, it differs from typical lichenicolous fungi by leaving no visible signs of its presence, being detectable only through molecular methods. It belongs to a group of Lawreymyces species that specifically associate with lichens in the family Verrucariaceae, particularly Normandina and Agonimia. This relationship parallels that of Cyphobasidium in Parmeliaceae lichens. The species is identifiable only through its unique internal transcribed spacer DNA sequence.
