= Camptosphaeria =

Scientific classification
- Kingdom: Fungi
- Division: Ascomycota
- Class: Sordariomycetes
- Order: Sordariales
- Family: Lasiosphaeriaceae
- Genus: Camptosphaeria; Fuckel

Type species
- Camptosphaeria sulphurea Fuckel

Genus of fungi

Camptosphaeria is a genus of fungi within the Lasiosphaeriaceae family.
