= Globosphaeria =

Scientific classification
- Kingdom: Fungi
- Division: Ascomycota
- Class: Sordariomycetes
- Order: Sordariales
- Genus: Globosphaeria; D.Hawksw. (1990)
- Species: G. jamesii

Binomial name
- Globosphaeria jamesii D.Hawksw. (1990)

Single-species fungal genus

Globosphaeria is a fungal genus that grows on lichens (lichenicolous fungi), containing the single species Globosphaeria jamesii. The fungus is characterised by dark, spherical fruiting bodies producing colourless, round spores, and is found growing on the lichen Normandina pulchella. First collected in Tasmania in 1907 but not described until 1990, it was later also discovered in the United States, making it known from just two locations globally. Though initially placed in the Xylariales, the genus is now classified in the order Sordariales, though its exact family placement remains uncertain.

== Taxonomy ==
Globosphaeria is a genus of fungi that grows on lichens (lichenicolous fungi), circumscribed by David Hawksworth in 1990. The genus contains only one known species, Globosphaeria jamesii, which was discovered growing on the lichen Normandina pulchella in Tasmania. The genus name combines the Latin word globosus (meaning spherical) – referring to the shape of its spores – with sphaeria, a reference to its historical classification in the old order Sphaeriales. The species epithet jamesii honours Peter Wilfred James, recognising his contributions to lichenology, including that of Tasmania, and in whose company the material was discovered.

The exact taxonomic placement of Globosphaeria remains uncertain. While it shows some similarities to fungi in both the Sordariales and Xylariales orders, it was initially tentatively placed in the Xylariales based on certain structural features, particularly its thread-like filaments (paraphyses) inside the spore-producing structures and the presence of a germination pore in its spores. It is now classified in the order Sordariales, though its familial placement remains uncertain.

== Description ==
Globosphaeria jamesii produces small, dark brown to black, nearly spherical fruiting bodies (perithecia) that grow on the surface of its host lichen. These structures are 0.25–0.3 mm in diameter and have a small opening (ostiole) at the top. The outer wall of the fruiting body is made up of a network of branching filaments and angular cells that give it a distinctive texture.

Inside the fruiting bodies are cylindrical spore sacs (asci) that measure 80–90 micrometres (μm) long and 8–11 μm wide. Each ascus contains eight spores arranged in a single row. These spores are spherical (globose), and colourless (hyaline), with smooth, thick walls up to 2 μm thick. They measure 8–10 μm in diameter and each has a single germination pore that allows it to grow when conditions are favourable.

== Habitat and distribution ==
Globosphaeria jamesii was first collected in Waratah, Tasmania, in February 1907, where it was found growing on the squamules (scale-like structures) of the lichen Normandina pulchella. However, the fungus itself wasn't identified and described as a new species until 1990, when Hawksworth examined the historical specimen. The type specimen was very limited in material, containing only two fruiting bodies, one of which had to be sacrificed for the scientific description. The relationship between G. jamesii and its host lichen appears to be either commensalistic (where one organism benefits while the other is unaffected) or possibly mutualistic (where both organisms benefit), as the fungus's pale brown filaments surround algal cells within the host lichen without causing any visible damage or discolouration.

After its description in 1990, the species remained known only from its original collection in Tasmania until 1998, when it was discovered for the first time in North America. This new specimen, which contained multiple fruiting bodies, was found near Sappho, Washington, USA, at an elevation of 180 m (590 ft) in an area northeast of Beaver Lake. This discovery not only expanded the known geographic range of the species but also provided additional material for study.

Despite these two known locations, G. jamesii remains a rarely collected species, known only from Tasmania and the Pacific Northwest of North America, always growing on the same host lichen species, Normandina pulchella. The species has been cited as an example of how describing new taxa based on singleton specimens can be scientifically valid when the material shows clear taxonomic novelty, even if additional specimens are not immediately available.
