= Anopodium =

Scientific classification
- Kingdom: Fungi
- Division: Ascomycota
- Class: Sordariomycetes
- Order: Sordariales
- Family: Lasiosphaeriaceae
- Genus: Anopodium; N. Lundq.

Type species
- Anopodium ampullaceum N. Lundq.

Genus of fungi

Anopodium is a genus of fungi within the Lasiosphaeriaceae family.
