= Arecacicola =

Scientific classification
- Kingdom: Fungi
- Division: Ascomycota
- Class: Sordariomycetes
- Order: Sordariales
- Family: Lasiosphaeriaceae
- Genus: Arecacicola; J.E. Taylor, J. Fröhl. & K.D. Hyde

Type species
- Arecacicola calami Joanne E. Taylor, J. Fröhl. & K.D. Hyde

Genus of fungi

Arecacicola is a genus of fungi within the Lasiosphaeriaceae family. This is a monotypic genus, containing the single species Arecacicola calami.
