= Fimetariella =

Scientific classification
- Kingdom: Fungi
- Division: Ascomycota
- Class: Sordariomycetes
- Order: Sordariales
- Family: Lasiosphaeriaceae
- Genus: Fimetariella; N. Lundq.

Type species
- Fimetariella rabenhorstii (Niessl) N. Lundq.

Genus of fungi

Fimetariella is a genus of fungi within the Lasiosphaeriaceae family.
