= Zygospermella =

Scientific classification
- Kingdom: Fungi
- Division: Ascomycota
- Class: Sordariomycetes
- Order: Sordariales
- Family: Lasiosphaeriaceae
- Genus: Zygospermella; Cain (1935)

Type species
- Zygospermella setosa (Cain) Cain (1935)

Species
- Z. insignis Z. setosa Z. striata

Genus of fungi

Zygospermella is a genus of fungi within the Lasiosphaeriaceae family.
