= Pseudodactylaria =

Scientific classification
- Kingdom: Fungi
- Division: Ascomycota
- Class: Sordariomycetes
- Subclass: Sordariomycetidae
- Order: Pseudodactylariales; Crous, Persoonia. 39:270-467 (2017)
- Family: Pseudodactylariaceae; Crous, Persoonia. 39: 421 (2017)
- Genus: Pseudodactylaria; Crous, Persoonia. 39:270-467 (2017)

Type species
- Pseudodactylaria xanthorrhoeae Crous, 2017

Genus of fungi

Pseudodactylaria are a genus of fungi (which has up to 10 species), within the monotypic family Pseudodactylariaceae Crous, and within the monotypic order Pseudodactylariales Crous, within the class Sordariomycetes. They are saprobic on plants in freshwater or terrestrial habitats.

== History ==
The genus Pseudodactylaria was originally established by Crous et al. (2017), based on the type species Pseudodactylaria xanthorrhoeae (from Australia), to accommodate two dactylaria-like species, namely as Pseudodactylaria hyalotunicata and also Pseudodactylaria xanthorrhoeae. Dactylaria hyalotunicata C.K.M. Tsui, Goh & K.D. Hyde which was found on submerged wood in river in Hong Kong in 1997, became Pseudodactylaria hyalotunicata in 2017.

The name Pseudodactylaria refers to resembling Dactylaria, is a genus of fungi belonging to Helotiales genera incertae sedis.

Family Pseudodactylariaceae was also introduced as a monotypic family by Crous et al. (2017) in the order Pseudodactylariales, Both in class Sordariomycetes. In Crous's study, the Pseudodactylariales formed a distinct clade and is phylogenetically close to orders Chaetosphaeriales and Vermiculariopsiellales within the subclass of Sordariomycetidae (Crous et al. 2017). Lin et al. in 2018, confirmed the taxonomic status of family Pseudodactylariaceae based on phylogenetic analysis of LSU gene and ITS sequence data, and introduced a new species, Pseudodactylaria brevis C.G. Lin, McKenzie & K.D. Hyde, based on phylogenetic and morphological evidence. Hyde et al. in 2020, then described Pseudodactylaria camporesiana W. Dong, Doilom & K.D. Hyde from submerged wood in a stream in Thailand. Lu et al. 2020 also stated that the Pseudodactylariales order formed a monotypic clade.

== Description ==
Species in the genus Pseudodactylaria are characterized by a sexual morph that is undetermined.

They have a hyphomycetous asexual morph. Which has single, unbranched or branched, septate (walled), thick-walled, hyaline (glass-like) conidiophores (specialized stalks holding the condia). They are sub-cylindrical, straight to flexuous (bendy or flexible) in shape and denticulate (having teeth-like structures). The solitary, hyaline, smooth-walled, conidia (spores) are fusoid (spindle-like shape) or ellipsoid and will combine or gather into a slimy mass. They are guttulate (having oil droplets inside) and surrounded by a thin mucilaginous (thick gluey substance) sheath (adapted from Crous et al. 2017a).

Species Pseudodactylaria aquatica has the same characteristics of the Pseudodactylaria genus. Although, it has brown to dark brown coloured conidiophores, which are gathered in groups of 3–5, and they have cylindrical, narrowly fusiform shaped conidia with a hyaline appendage at the base. While other Pseudodactylaria species have single conidiophores and conidia that are lacking an appendage.

Pseudodactylaria albicolonia was found in 2021 in Thailand was characterized by white erect conidiophores, fusoid-ellipsoid conidia that was also surrounded by a thin mucilaginous sheath.

== Species ==
Originally only 3 species were accepted in the genus Pseudodactylaria; Pseudodactylaria brevis, Pseudodactylaria hyalotunicata and Pseudodactylaria xanthorrhoeae in 2018.

10 species are accepted by Species Fungorum (as of June 2023);

- Pseudodactylaria albicolonia R.J. Xu, Boonmee & K.D. Hyde (2021)
- Pseudodactylaria aquatica D.F. Bao, H.Y. Su, K.D. Hyde & Z.L. Luo (2021)
- Pseudodactylaria brevis C.G. Lin, McKenzie & K.D. Hyde (2018)
- Pseudodactylaria camporesiana W. Dong, Doilom & K.D. Hyde (2020)
- Pseudodactylaria denticulata J. Yang, E.B.G. Jones & K.D. Hyde (2023)
- Pseudodactylaria fusiformis Y.Z. Lu, J.Y. Zhang & Jian K. Liu (2020)
- Pseudodactylaria hyalotunicata (C.K.M. Tsui, Goh & K.D. Hyde) Crous (2017)
- Pseudodactylaria longidenticulata J. Yang, E.B.G. Jones & K.D. Hyde (2023)
- Pseudodactylaria uniseptata J. Yang, E.B.G. Jones & K.D. Hyde (2023)
- Pseudodactylaria xanthorrhoeae Crous (2017)

== Hosts ==
Pseudodactylaria xanthorrhoeae found on Australian native shrub, Xanthorrhoea sp. While Pseudodactylaria fusiformis can be found on Culms (stems) of various Bamboo sp. in Guizhou, China. Also, Pseudodactylaria aquatica is a lignicolous species (living in or on wood) and is saprobic on decaying wood submerged in freshwater habitats in China. Lastly, Pseudodactylaria albicolonia has been found on decaying submerged wood in a freshwater streams.

== Distribution and habitat ==
Pseudodactylariales have a distribution worldwide, it has been found in South America, occasionally in parts of North America, Europe (in Spain and Italy), Central and Southern Africa, parts of Eastern Asia (including Thailand, Hong Kong, and China,), New Zealand, and Australia.
