= Bombardioidea =

Scientific classification
- Kingdom: Fungi
- Division: Ascomycota
- Class: Sordariomycetes
- Order: Sordariales
- Family: Lasiosphaeriaceae
- Genus: Bombardioidea; C. Moreau ex N. Lundqv.

Type species
- Bombardioidea bombardioides (Auersw.) C. Moreau ex C. Moreau

Genus of fungi

Bombardioidea is a genus of fungi within the Lasiosphaeriaceae family.
