= Strattonia =

Scientific classification
- Kingdom: Fungi
- Division: Ascomycota
- Class: Sordariomycetes
- Order: Sordariales
- Family: Strattoniaceae; S.K.Huang, Maharachch. & K.D.Hyde
- Genus: Strattonia; Cif.

Type species
- Strattonia tetraspora (R. Stratton) Cif.

Genus of fungi

Strattonia is a genus of fungi within the family Strattoniaceae.

The genus was circumscribed by Raffaele Ciferri in Sydowia vol.8 on page 245 in 1954.

The genus name of Strattonia is in honour of Robert Stratton (1883–1961), who was an American botanist and Mycologist, Professor of Botany and Plant pathology at the Oklahoma Agricultural and Mechanical College and at the Agricultural Experiment Station in Stillwater.

== Species ==
As accepted by Species Fungorum;

- Strattonia borealis N. Lundq. (1972)
- Strattonia dissimilis Barrasa, Soláns & G. Moreno (1985)
- Strattonia grandis A.E. Bell & Mahoney (2005)
- Strattonia insignis (E.C. Hansen) N. Lundq. (1972)
- Strattonia mesopotamica Abdullah (1983)
- Strattonia oblecythiformis A.E. Bell & Mahoney (2005)
- Strattonia petrogale (A.E. Bell) S.K. Huang & K.D. Hyde (2021)
- Strattonia tetraspora (R. Stratton) Cif. (1954)
- Strattonia zopfii N. Lundq. (1972)

Former species;

- Strattonia carbonaria (W. Phillips & Plowr.) N. Lundq. (1972) = Jugulospora carbonaria, Neoschizotheciaceae
- Strattonia karachiensis S.I. Ahmed & Asad (1968) = Lundqvistomyces karachiensis, Schizotheciaceae
- Strattonia minor N. Lundq. (1972) = Jugulospora minor, Neoschizotheciaceae
