= Phaeotrichosphaeria =

Scientific classification
- Kingdom: Fungi
- Division: Ascomycota
- Class: Sordariomycetes
- Order: incertae sedis
- Family: incertae sedis
- Genus: Phaeotrichosphaeria; Sivan.

Type species
- Phaeotrichosphaeria indica Sivan. & N.D. Sharma

Genus of fungi

Phaeotrichosphaeria is a genus of fungi in the Sordariomycetes class (subclass Sordariomycetidae) of the Ascomycota. The relationship of this taxon to other taxa within the class is unknown (incertae sedis), and it has not yet been placed with certainty into any order or family.
