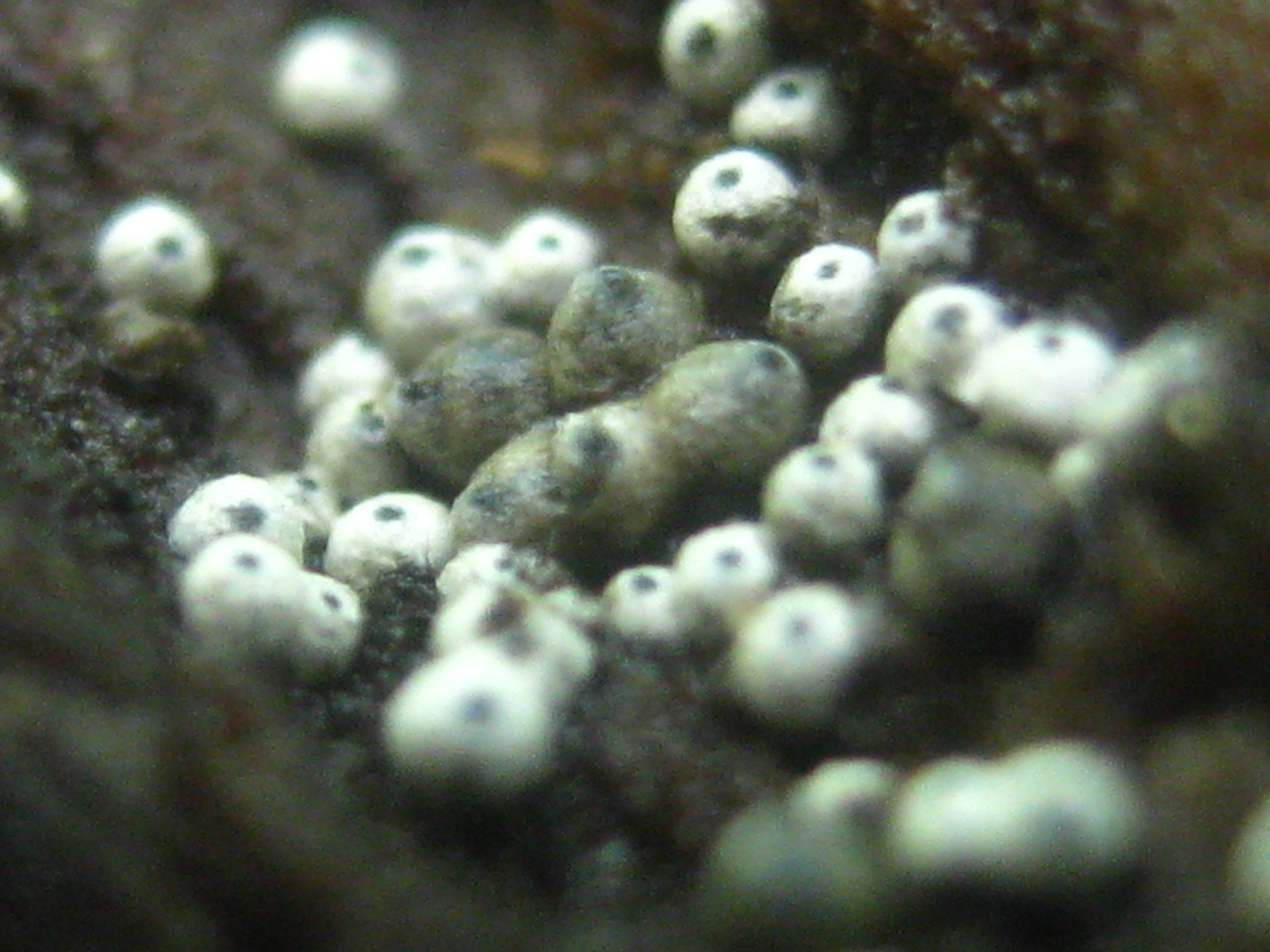
- Lasiosphaeria sp.

Scientific classification
- Kingdom: Fungi
- Division: Ascomycota
- Class: Sordariomycetes
- Order: Sordariales
- Family: Lasiosphaeriaceae
- Genus: Lasiosphaeria; Ces. & De Not. (1863)

Type species
- Lasiosphaeria ovina (Pers.) Ces. & De Not. (1863)

Synonyms
- Hormosperma Penz. & Sacc. (1897); Lasiella Quél. (1875); Lasiosordariella Chenant. (1919)

= Lasiosphaeria =

Genus of fungi

Lasiosphaeria is a genus of fungi in the family Lasiosphaeriaceae.

== Species ==
- L. alexandrae
- L. alexandricola
- L. angustispora
- L. araneosa
- L. aristata
- L. bambusicola
- L. biformis
- L. bravoi
- L. calligoni
- L. calva
- L. capitata
- L. caraguatae
- L. caryophylli
- L. chapmanii
- L. coacta
- L. conica
- L. culmicola
- L. culmorum
- L. cylindrospora
- L. dactylina
- L. depilata
- L. elephantina
- L. elinorae
- L. encalyptae
- L. faginea
- L. felina
- L. foliicola
- L. geranii
- L. gibberosa
- L. glabra
- L. glabrata
- L. globularis
- L. heterotricha
- L. hispidula
- L. insignis
- L. invisibila
- L. kamatii
- L. lanuginosa
- L. leptochaeta
- L. meningiensis
- L. meznaensis
- L. miconiae
- L. micranthi
- L. microspora
- L. mollis
- L. monotropae
- L. moseri
- L. mucida
- L. multiseptata
- L. nematospora
- L. ovina
- L. pallida
- L. paucipilis
- L. phyllophila
- L. polyporicola
- L. porifera
- L. punctata
- L. pyramidata
- L. racodium
- L. rickii
- L. rufula
- L. rugulosa
- L. setosa
- L. sorbina
- L. stictochaetophora
- L. strigosa
- L. tuberculosa
- L. vestita
- L. volvestriana
