= Arnium =

Scientific classification
- Kingdom: Fungi
- Division: Ascomycota
- Class: Sordariomycetes
- Order: Sordariales
- Family: Lasiosphaeriaceae
- Genus: Arnium; Nitschke ex G. Winter

Type species
- Arnium lanuginosum Nitschke

Genus of fungi

Arnium is a genus of fungi within the Lasiosphaeriaceae family.
