= Rosička (Žďár nad Sázavou District) =

- Municipality
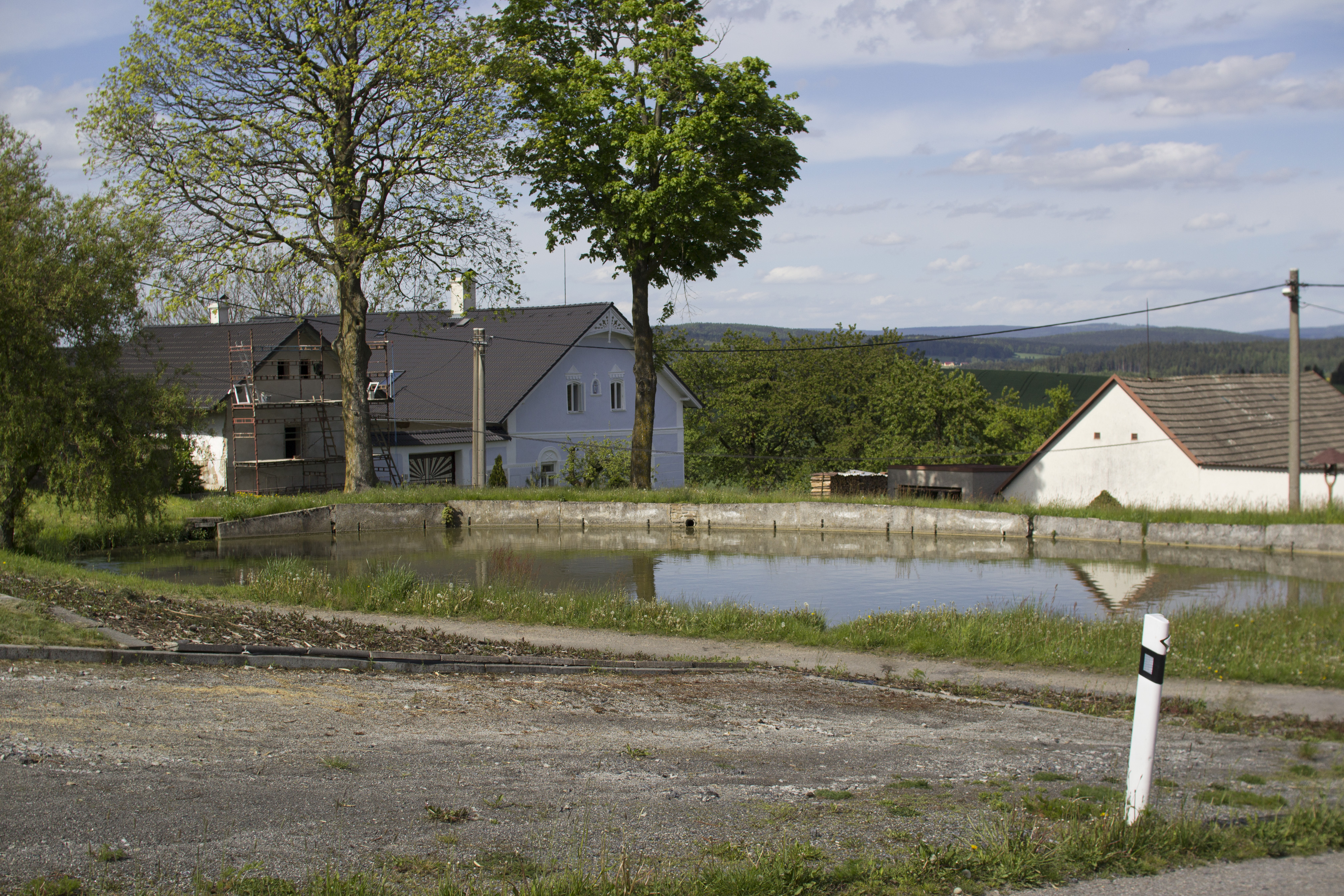
- Pond

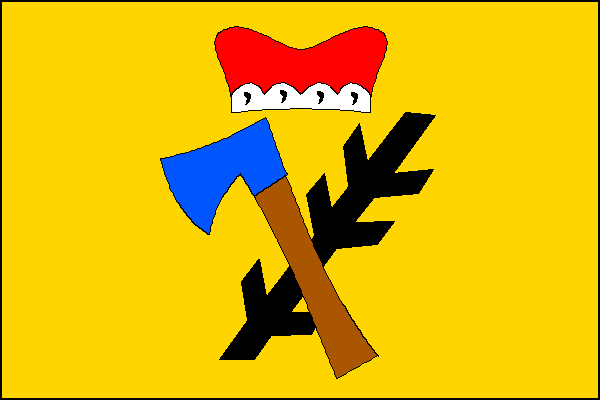
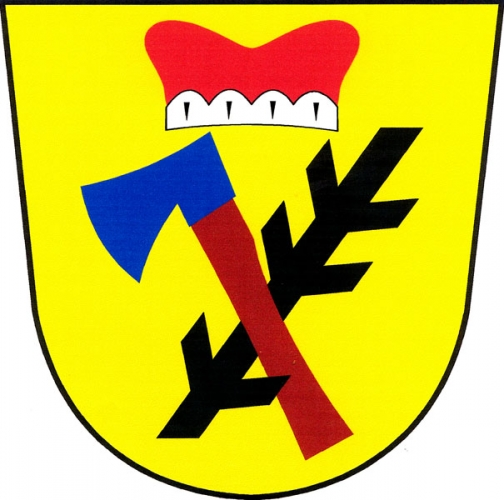
- Flag Coat of arms

- Location in the Czech Republic
- Coordinates: 49°32′13″N 15°51′0″E
- Country: Czech Republic
- Region: Vysočina
- District: Žďár nad Sázavou
- First mentioned: 1356

Area
  - Total: 2.70 km^{2} (1.04 sq mi)
- Elevation: 608 m (1,995 ft)

Population (2026-01-01)
  - Total: 45
  - Density: 17/km^{2} (43/sq mi)
- Time zone: UTC+1 (CET)
  - Summer (DST): UTC+2 (CEST)
- Postal code: 592 12
- Website: www.obec-rosicka.cz

Rosička is a municipality and village in Žďár nad Sázavou District in the Vysočina Region of the Czech Republic. It has about 50 inhabitants.

Rosička lies approximately 8 kilometres (5 mi) south-west of Žďár nad Sázavou, 25 km (16 mi) north-east of Jihlava, and 120 km (75 mi) south-east of Prague.

== Demographics ==
Historical population
Year	Pop.	±%
1869	136	—
1880	116	−14.7%
1890	122	+5.2%
1900	134	+9.8%
1910	148	+10.4%
1921	148	+0.0%
1930	127	−14.2%
1950	105	−17.3%
1961	95	−9.5%
1970	85	−10.5%
1980	82	−3.5%
1991	54	−34.1%
2001	49	−9.3%
2011	46	−6.1%
2021	41	−10.9%
Source: Censuses
