= Biconiosporella =

Scientific classification
- Kingdom: Fungi
- Division: Ascomycota
- Class: Sordariomycetes
- Order: incertae sedis
- Genus: Biconiosporella; Schaumann (1972)

Type species
- Biconiosporella corniculata Schaumann (1972)

Genus of fungi

Biconiosporella is a fungal genus in the Sordariomycetes class of the Ascomycota. The relationship of this taxon to other taxa within the class is unknown (incertae sedis), and it has not yet been placed with certainty into any order or family. This is a monotypic genus, containing the single species Biconiosporella corniculata.
