= Gustav Niessl von Mayendorf =

Austrian astronomer and mycologist (1839–1919)

Gustav Niessl von Mayendorf (26 April 1839 in Verona – 1 September 1919 in Hütteldorf, Vienna; often cited as G. von Niessl), was an astronomer and mycologist from Austria-Hungary. Niessl developed interests in botany, astronomy, and mathematics from a young age. His academic career began in 1859 as an assistant professor at the polytechnic institute in Brno, where he later became a full professor and served as rector (1877–1878). As an astronomer, he conducted research on meteor orbits that earned him membership in the Austrian Academy of Sciences, while his mycological work focused on microscopic fungi, resulting in an extensive herbarium and the description of several species. Niessl was instrumental in founding the Natural Science Society in Brno, serving as its secretary for over four decades (1865–1907), and received numerous honours throughout his career, including a government medal in 1883, appointment as court councillor in 1889, and an honorary doctorate upon his retirement in 1907.

== Early life and education ==
Niessl was born on 26 April 1839 in Verona, the son of an Austrian artillery officer and passionate naturalist who maintained extensive natural history collections. His family moved shortly after his birth to Štýrský Hradec, where Niessl began his schooling. From the age of twenty, he developed a particular interest in botany, astronomy, and mathematics. He studied initially at a technical secondary school (reálka) and later attended the polytechnic institute in Vienna, where he began specialising in cryptogams, particularly microscopic fungi.

== Career ==
In 1859, at just twenty years old, Niessl became an assistant professor of practical geometry at the polytechnic institute in Brno. He was appointed full professor there in 1860, teaching practical geometry as well as astronomy. In 1867, he became a regular professor of applied geometry and higher geodesy and served as rector of the polytechnic from 1877 to 1878.

Niessl played a significant role in the founding of the Natural Science Society in Brno (Naturforschender Verein) in 1861 and was its secretary from 1865 to 1907. He retired from his professorial duties in 1907, receiving an honorary doctorate the same year. His professional contributions were recognised through various honours, including a government medal in 1883 and appointment as a court councillor in 1889.

== Research contributions ==
Niessl's scientific research encompassed geodesy, astronomy, and mycology. As an astronomer, he conducted influential research on meteor orbits, for which he became a corresponding member of the Austrian Academy of Sciences in 1904. He published numerous botanical surveys, particularly on the flora of Moravian regions such as Kroměříž, Svitavy, Letovice, Rosicka, Lednice, Mikulov, and Vranov nad Dyjí.

His mycological work primarily involved microscopic fungi. Niessl assembled a mycological herbarium, much of which later formed part of the botanical collections of museums and universities in Brno and Opava. The fungal genus Niesslia commemorates his contributions, and he described species including Uromyces pallidus.

Niessl collected specimens which were widely distributed in exsiccata works, among others Ascomyceten edited by Heinrich Rehm, Flora exsiccata Austro-Hungarica edited by Anton Kerner von Marilaun and Eumycetes selecti exsiccati edited by Josef Karl Weese.

On the basis of a testamentary disposition by Niessl, a foundation for the benefit of botany and mycology at the Ludwig-Maximilians-Universität München was established in 1929. Since 1930, his large fungarium is integrated in the collections of the Botanische Staatssammlung München.
