= Diffractella =

Scientific classification
- Kingdom: Fungi
- Division: Ascomycota
- Class: Sordariomycetes
- Order: Sordariales
- Family: Lasiosphaeriaceae
- Genus: Diffractella; Guarro, P.F. Cannon & Aa
- Species: D. curvata

Binomial name
- Diffractella curvata Guarro, P.F. Cannon & Aa

Genus of fungi

Diffractella is a genus of fungi within the Lasiosphaeriaceae family. This is a monotypic genus, containing the single species Diffractella curvata.
