= Abyssomyces =

Scientific classification
- Kingdom: Fungi
- Division: Ascomycota
- Class: Sordariomycetes
- Informal group: Sordariomycetes incertae sedis
- Genus: Abyssomyces; Kohlm. (1970)

Type species
- Abyssomyces hydrozoicus Kohlm. (1970)

Genus of fungi

Abyssomyces is a genus of fungi within the class Sordariomycetes. The relationship of this taxon to other taxa within the class is unknown (incertae sedis). This is a monotypic genus, containing the single species Abyssomyces hydrozoicus, found in Antarctica.
