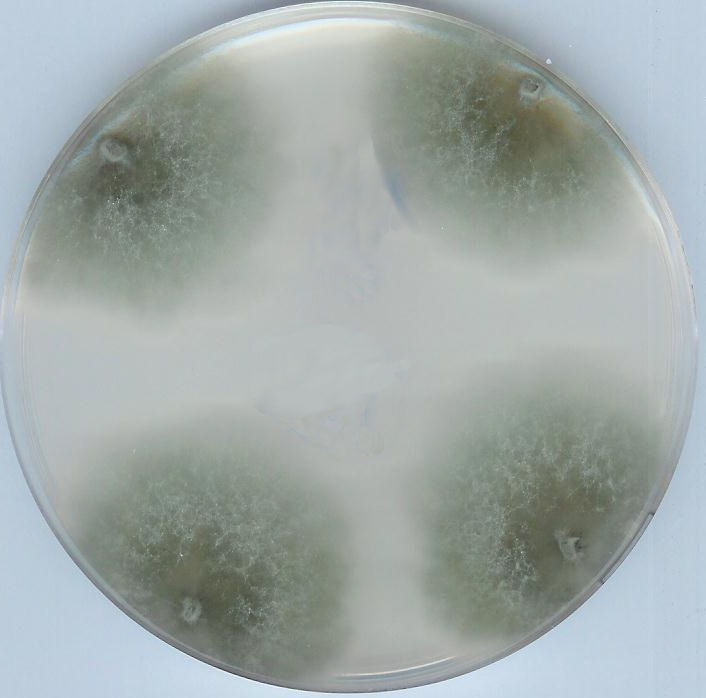
- Podospora anserina. Wild type strain on a Petri dish.

Scientific classification
- Domain: Eukaryota
- Kingdom: Fungi
- Division: Ascomycota
- Class: Sordariomycetes
- Order: Sordariales
- Family: Podosporaceae
- Genus: Podospora; Ces. (1856)

Type species
- Podospora fimiseda (Ces. & De Not.) Niessl (1883)

= Podospora =

Genus of fungi on the family Podosporaceae

Podospora is a genus of fungi in the family Podosporaceae. Fossils of Podospora have been reported from 12 million year old rocks from central England.

== Species ==
- Podospora adelura (Griffiths) Cain
- Podospora alexandri Doveri
- Podospora ampullacea Cailleux
- Podospora anamalayensis V.G.Rao & Varghese
- Podospora anomala (Griffiths) Cain
- Podospora anserina (Rabenh.) Niessl
- Podospora apiculifera (Speg.) Mirza & Cain
- Podospora appendiculata (Auersw. ex Niessl) Niessl
- Podospora araneosa (Cain) Cain
- Podospora argentinensis (Speg.) J.H.Mirza & Cain
- Podospora australis (Speg.) Niessl
- Podospora austroamericana (Speg.) J.H.Mirza & Cain
- Podospora austrohemisphaerica N.Lundq.
- Podospora badia Sultana
- Podospora bicolor Cailleux
- Podospora bicornis N.Lundq.
- Podospora bifida N.Lundq.
- Podospora brasiliensis Cain
- Podospora bulbillosa (W.Gams & Mouch.) X.Wei Wang & Houbraken
- Podospora bullata A.E.Bell & Mahoney
- Podospora cainii Narendra & V.G.Rao
- Podospora caligata R.S.Khan & Cain
- Podospora caprarum Petr.
- Podospora castorinospora Cain
- Podospora castorinospra Cain
- Podospora cecropiae C.Ram
- Podospora cochleariformis Cailleux
- Podospora coeruleotecta (Rehm) Cain
- Podospora collapsa (Griffiths) Cain
- Podospora communis (Speg.) Niessl
- Podospora cryptospora Rehm
- Podospora cupiformis Cailleux
- Podospora curvicolla (G.Winter) Niessl
- Podospora dactylina N.Lundq.
- Podospora dagobertii C.Moreau
- Podospora dasypogon N.Lundq.
- Podospora decidua Cailleux
- Podospora decipiens (G.Winter) Niessl
- Podospora deltoides R.S.Khan & J.C.Krug
- Podospora deropodalis R.S.Khan & Cain
- Podospora didyma J.H.Mirza & Cain
- Podospora dimorpha A.E.Bell
- Podospora dolichopodalis J.H.Mirza & Cain
- Podospora egyptiaca N.Lundq.
- Podospora ellisiana (Griffiths) J.H.Mirza & Cain
- Podospora euphratica Abdullah
- Podospora excentrica N.Lundq.
- Podospora fabiformis A.E.Bell & Mahoney
- Podospora fibrinocaudata R.S.Khan & J.C.Krug
- Podospora filiformis Cailleux
- Podospora fimiseda (Ces. & De Not.) Niessl
- Podospora gigantea J.H.Mirza & Cain
- Podospora globosa (Massee & E.S.Salmon) Cain
- Podospora granulostriata N.Lundq.
- Podospora gwynne-vaughaniae (W.M.Page) Cain
- Podospora hirsuta P.A.Dang.
- Podospora horridula (Sacc.) Dennis & S.M.Francis
- Podospora hyalopilosa (R.Stratton) Cain
- Podospora ignata A.E.Bell & Mahoney
- Podospora ignota A.E.Bell & Mahoney
- Podospora immersa (R.Stratton) Cain
- Podospora inaequilateralis (Cain) Cain
- Podospora inflatula Cain
- Podospora inquinata Udagawa & S.Ueda
- Podospora intestinacea N.Lundq.
- Podospora karachiensis Mirza & Cain
- Podospora kilimandscharica (Alf. Schmidt) Cain
- Podospora lautarea Guiraud, Sage, Seigle-Mur. & Steiman
- Podospora leporina (Cain) Cain
- Podospora levis Milovtz.
- Podospora lindquistii García-Zorrón
- Podospora longicaudata (Griffiths) Cain
- Podospora longicollis (L.M.Ames) J.H.Mirza & Cain
- Podospora longispora (Bat. & Pontual) N.Lundq.
- Podospora macrodecipiens M.J.Richardson
- Podospora macropodalis Mirza & Cain
- Podospora mexicana Mirza & Cain
- Podospora millespora (Alf. Schmidt) Cain
- Podospora minicauda Faurel & Locq.-Lin.
- Podospora minipistillata R.S.Khan & J.C.Krug
- Podospora minor Ellis & Everh.
- Podospora multicaudiculata Cailleux
- Podospora multispora R.S.Khan & Cain
- Podospora myriospora (P.Crouan & H. Crouan) Niessl
- Podospora obclavata A.E.Bell
- Podospora ontariensis (Cain) Cain
- Podospora ostlingospora Cain
- Podospora papilionacea N.Lundq.
- Podospora papillata R.S.Khan & Cain
- Podospora papilliformis Cain
- Podospora pectinata N.Lundq.
- Podospora perplexens (Cain) Cain
- Podospora petrogale A.E.Bell
- Podospora pistillata Mirza & Cain
- Podospora platensis (Speg.) Niessl
- Podospora pleiospora (G.Winter) Niessl
- Podospora praecox Cailleux
- Podospora prethopodalis Cain
- Podospora prolifica Cailleux
- Podospora pseudoinquinata S.I.Ahmed & Masood
- Podospora pyriformis (A.Bayer) Cain
- Podospora roselliniella Kamyschko
- Podospora selenospora Stchigel, Guarro & M.Calduch
- Podospora seminuda (Griffiths) Mirza & Cain
- Podospora serotina Cailleux
- Podospora sibirica Grebenjuk
- Podospora spinulosa R.S.Khan & Cain
- Podospora strobiliformis Teng
- Podospora taenioides (Griffiths) Cain
- Podospora tarvisina (Sacc.) J.H.Mirza & Cain
- Podospora trichomanes N.Lundq.
- Podospora unicaudata (C.Moreau & M. Moreau ex G.Sm.) Cain
- Podospora venezuelensis Mirza & Cain
- Podospora vertesensis (Tóth) N.Lundq.
- Podospora xerampelina N.Lundq.
