= Cercophora (fungus) =

Scientific classification
- Kingdom: Fungi
- Division: Ascomycota
- Class: Sordariomycetes
- Order: Sordariales
- Family: Neoschizotheciaceae
- Genus: Cercophora; Fuckel

Type species
- Cercophora mirabilis Fuckel

Genus of fungi

Cercophora is a genus of fungi which was within the Lasiosphaeriaceae family. As of 2020, it was placed into the Neoschizotheciaceae family.

== Species ==
As accepted by Species Fungorum;

- Cercophora acanthigera (Berk. & Broome) N. Lundq. (1972)
- Cercophora aggregata N. Lundq. (1996)
- Cercophora albicollis N. Lundq. (1972)
- Cercophora aligarhiensis Mukerji, R.N. Kumar & N. Singh (1995)
- Cercophora ambigua (Sacc.) R. Hilber (1979)
- Cercophora anisura N. Lundq. (1972)
- Cercophora appalachianensis O. Hilber & R. Hilber (1987)
- Cercophora aquatica P. Chaudhary, J. Fourn. & A.N. Mill. (2007)
- Cercophora argentina Catania, A.I. Romero, Huhndorf & A.N. Mill. (2011)
- Cercophora brevifila N. Lundq. & Fakirova (1973)
- Cercophora caerulea (Petch) N. Lundq. (1972)
- Cercophora cainii Mukerji, R.N. Kumar & N. Singh (1995)
- Cercophora californica (Plowr.) N. Lundq. (1972)
- Cercophora cephalothecoidea Doveri (2016)
- Cercophora citrina (Petch) N. Lundq. (1972)
- Cercophora coprogena (Speg.) N. Lundq. (1972)
- Cercophora coronata (Cailleux) Udagawa & T. Muroi (1979)
- Cercophora crustosa (Massee) P. Chaudhary, J. Fourn. & A.N. Mill. (2007)
- Cercophora dulciaquae M.S. Calabon, E.B.G. Jones & K.D. Hyde (2021)
- Cercophora fici Tennakoon, C.H. Kuo & K.D. Hyde (2021)
- Cercophora flabelliformis A.E. Bell & Mahoney (2016)
- Cercophora gossypina N. Lundq. (1972)
- Cercophora himalayensis Udagawa & Y. Sugiy. (1982)
- Cercophora hydrophila (Kirschst.) P. Chaudhary, J. Fourn. & A.N. Mill. (2007)
- Cercophora ignis A.E. Bell & Mahoney (2016)
- Cercophora indica (Tilak & Srinivas.) A. Pande (2008)
- Cercophora kalimpongensis Mukerji, R.N. Kumar & N. Singh (1995)
- Cercophora limneticum K.N. Borse, N.S. Pawar & B.D. Borse (2019)
- Cercophora macrocarpa (G.C. Carroll & Munk) O. Hilber & R. Hilber (1979)
- Cercophora minuta Mukerji, R.N. Kumar & N. Singh (1995)
- Cercophora mirabilis Fuckel (1870)
- Cercophora mutabilis (Cailleux) Doveri (2016)
- Cercophora nainitalensis Mukerji, R.N. Kumar & N. Singh (1995)
- Cercophora natalitia (Speg.) N. Lundq. (1972)
- Cercophora newfieldiana (Ellis & Everh.) R. Hilber (1979)
- Cercophora ovalis Mukerji, R.N. Kumar & N. Singh (1995)
- Cercophora pakistani (J.H. Mirza) Arx (1973)
- Cercophora palmicola Hanlin & Tortolero (1987)
- Cercophora pilosa Mukerji, R.N. Kumar & N. Singh (1995)
- Cercophora recta A.E. Bell & Mahoney (2005)
- Cercophora rostrata (Cailleux) Doveri (2016)
- Cercophora rubrotuberculata A.N. Mill., Mugambi & Huhndorf (2007)
- Cercophora sarawacensis (Ces.) N. Lundq. (1972)
- Cercophora scortea (Cain) N. Lundq. (1972)
- Cercophora septentrionalis N. Lundq. (1972)
- Cercophora silvatica N. Lundq. (1972)
- Cercophora similiscortea A.E. Bell & Mahoney (2016)
- Cercophora solaris (Cooke & Ellis) R. Hilber & O. Hilber (1979)
- Cercophora sordarioides (Speg.) N. Lundq. (1972)
- Cercophora sparsa (Sacc. & Fairm.) R. Hilber (1979)
- Cercophora spinosa (Harkn.) M.E. Barr (1993)
- Cercophora spirillospora (Penz. & Sacc.) N. Lundq. (1972)
- Cercophora squamulosa A.N. Mill., J. Fourn., Raja & Lechat (2016)
- Cercophora sulphurella (Sacc.) R. Hilber (1979)
- Cercophora thailandica D.Q. Dai & K.D. Hyde (2016)
- Cercophora tuberculata Mukerji, R.N. Kumar & N. Singh (1995)
- Cercophora vinosa A.N. Mill. & J. Fourn. (2016)

Former species;

- C. angulispora (Cain & Farrow) Stchigel & Guarro (2000) = Triangularia angulispora, Podosporaceae
- C. arenicola R. Hilber (1979) = Lasiosphaeris arenicola, Lasiosphaeridaceae
- C. areolata N. Lundq. (1972) = Areotheca areolata, Naviculisporaceae
- C. atropurpurea A.N. Mill. & Huhndorf (2001) = Pseudoschizothecium atropurpureum, Schizotheciaceae
- C. caudata (Sacc.) N. Lundq. (1972) = Immersiella caudata, Neoschizotheciaceae
- C. citrinella N. Lundq. (1972) = Camptosphaeria citrinella, Sordariales
- C. conica Fuckel (1870) = Neoschizothecium conicum, Neoschizotheciaceae
- C. coprophila (Fr.) N. Lundq. (1972) = Cladorrhinum coprophilum, Podosporaceae
- C. costaricensis (G.C. Carroll & Munk) O. Hilber & R. Hilber (1979) = Podospora costaricensis, Podosporaceae
- C. elephantina (Henn.) N. Lundq. (1972) = Lasiosphaeria elephantina, Lasiosphaeriaceae
- C. grandiuscula A.E. Bell & Mahoney (2005) = Cladorrhinum grandiusculum, Podosporaceae
- C. heterospora Mukerji, R.N. Kumar & N. Singh (1995) = Tripterosporella heterospora, Sordariales
- C. lanuginosa (P. Crouan & H. Crouan) N. Lundq. (1972) = Lasiosphaeria lanuginosa, Lasiosphaeriaceae
- C. meynae (R. Rao) A. Pande (2008) = Bovilla meynae, Lasiosphaeriaceae
- C. muskokensis (Cain) N. Lundq. (1972) = Sporormiella muskokensis, Sporormiaceae
- C. pongamiae (R. Rao) A. Pande (2008) = Bovilla pongamiae, Lasiosphaeriaceae
- C. rugulosa A.N. Mill. & Huhndorf (2001) = Lasiosphaeria rugulosa, Lasiosphaeriaceae
- C. samala Udagawa & T. Muroi (1979) = Triangularia samala, Podosporaceae
- C. striata (Ellis & Everh.) N. Lundq. (1972) = Triangularia striata, Podosporaceae
- C. sulphurea (Fuckel) N. Lundq. (1972) = Camptosphaeria sulphurea, Sordariales
- C. terricola S. Ueda (1994) = Cladorrhinum terricola, Podosporaceae
