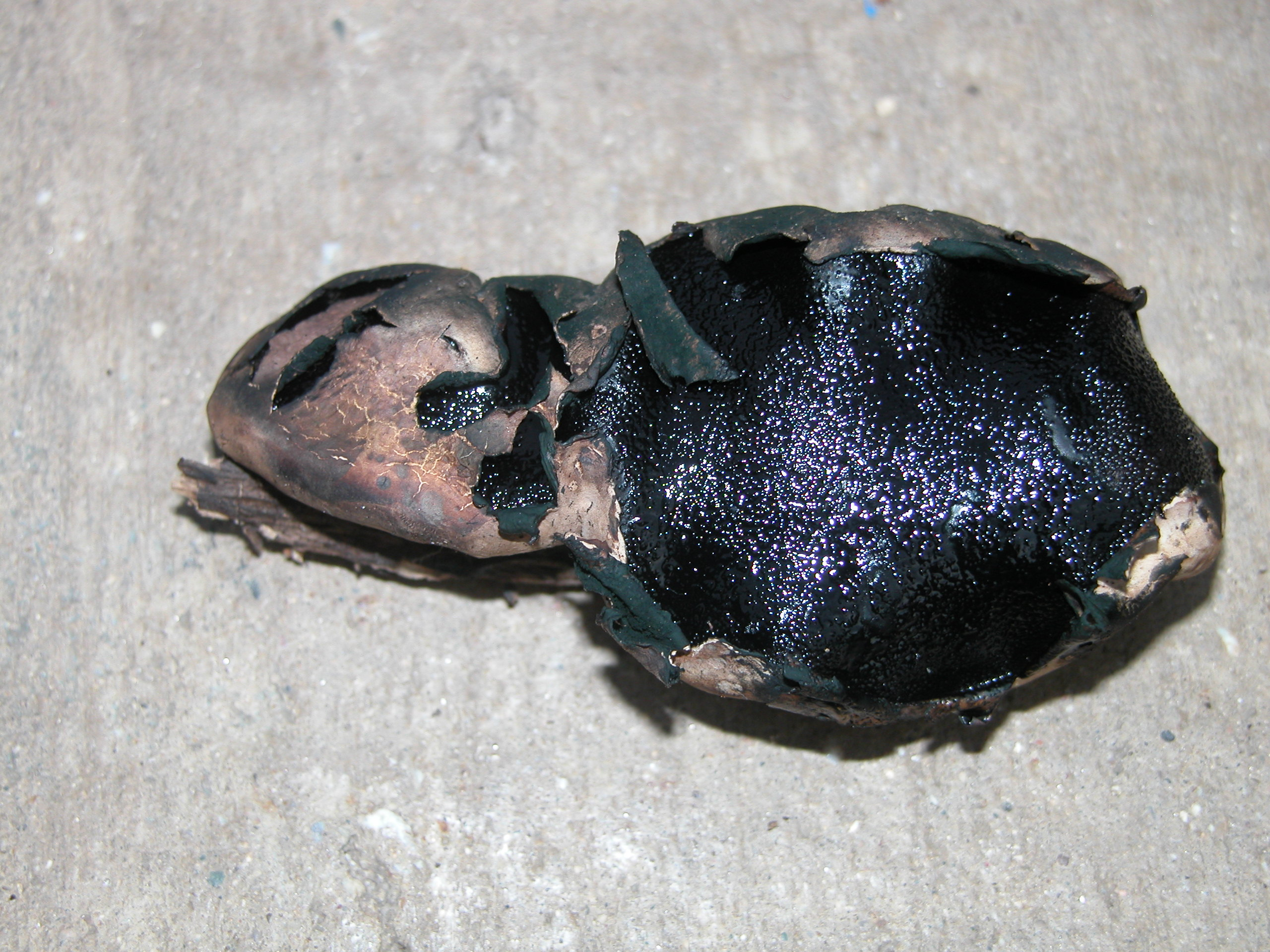
- Camarops petersii

Scientific classification
- Domain: Eukaryota
- Kingdom: Fungi
- Division: Ascomycota
- Class: Sordariomycetes
- Subclass: Sordariomycetidae; O.E.Erikss. & Winka (1997)

Orders
- Boliniales; Cephalothecales; Chaetosphaeriales; Coniochaetales; Meliolales; Phyllachorales; Pseudodactylariales; Sordariales

Synonyms
- Meliolomycetidae P.M.Kirk & K.D.Hyde, 2016

= Sordariomycetidae =

Subclass of sac fungi

Sordariomycetidae is a subclass of sac fungi.

Generally, species within the Sordariomycetidae subclass have light-dark coloured perithecia (flask shaped structures opening by a pore). The asci are non-amyloid, or lack apical rings. True paraphyses are normally present in most species.

Three new genera were created within the Sordariomycetidae subclass based on morphological and molecular data (SSU and LSU nrDNA) to hold five ascomycete fungi species collected from submerged woody debris in freshwater habitats from Costa Rica.

In 2015, after a study that found several genera of fungi taxa were phylogenetically and morphologically distinct from genera in Sordariomycetidae. So the subclass Diaporthomycetidae was formed for those different that were already placed within Sordariomycetidae subclass.

Wijayawardene et al. in 2020 added more families and genera to the order.

== Incertae sedis ==
Familiae;

- Aquapteridosporaceae
- Batistiaceae

Genera (with amount of species);

- Arecacicola (1)
- Bullimyces (3)
- Ceratolenta (1)
- Chaetosphaerides (1)
- Cryptophyllachora (2)
- Hanliniomyces (1)
- Hydromelitis (1)
- Merugia (1)
- Mycomedusiospora (1)
- Myxocephala (1)
- Neolinocarpon
- Nigromammilla (1)
- Phaeotrichosphaeria (4)
- Phragmodiscus (2)
- Pseudobotrytis (2)
