= Neoschizotheciaceae =

Scientific classification
- Kingdom: Fungi
- Division: Ascomycota
- Class: Sordariomycetes
- Order: Sordariales
- Family: Neoschizotheciaceae; S.K. Huang & K.D. Hyde

Type genus

Family of fungi

The Neoschizotheciaceae are a family of fungi in the Ascomycota, class Sordariomycetes and order Sordariales.

It was introduced in 2021 after molecular analysis of several species of fungi in the order Sordariales. These taxa were found to be similar to taxa found in the families Bombardiaceae, Podosporaceae and Lasiosphaeriaceae, as they had ellipsoidal ascospores, sometimes with appendages, but they were phylogenetically distinct from these three families. Neoschizotheciaceae was established based on Neoschizothecium.

== Genera ==
- Apodus (2)
- Cercophora (77)
- Echria (2)
- Immersiella (2)
- Jugulospora (1)
- Neoschizothecium (10)
- Rinaldiella (1)
- Zygopleurage (3) )
