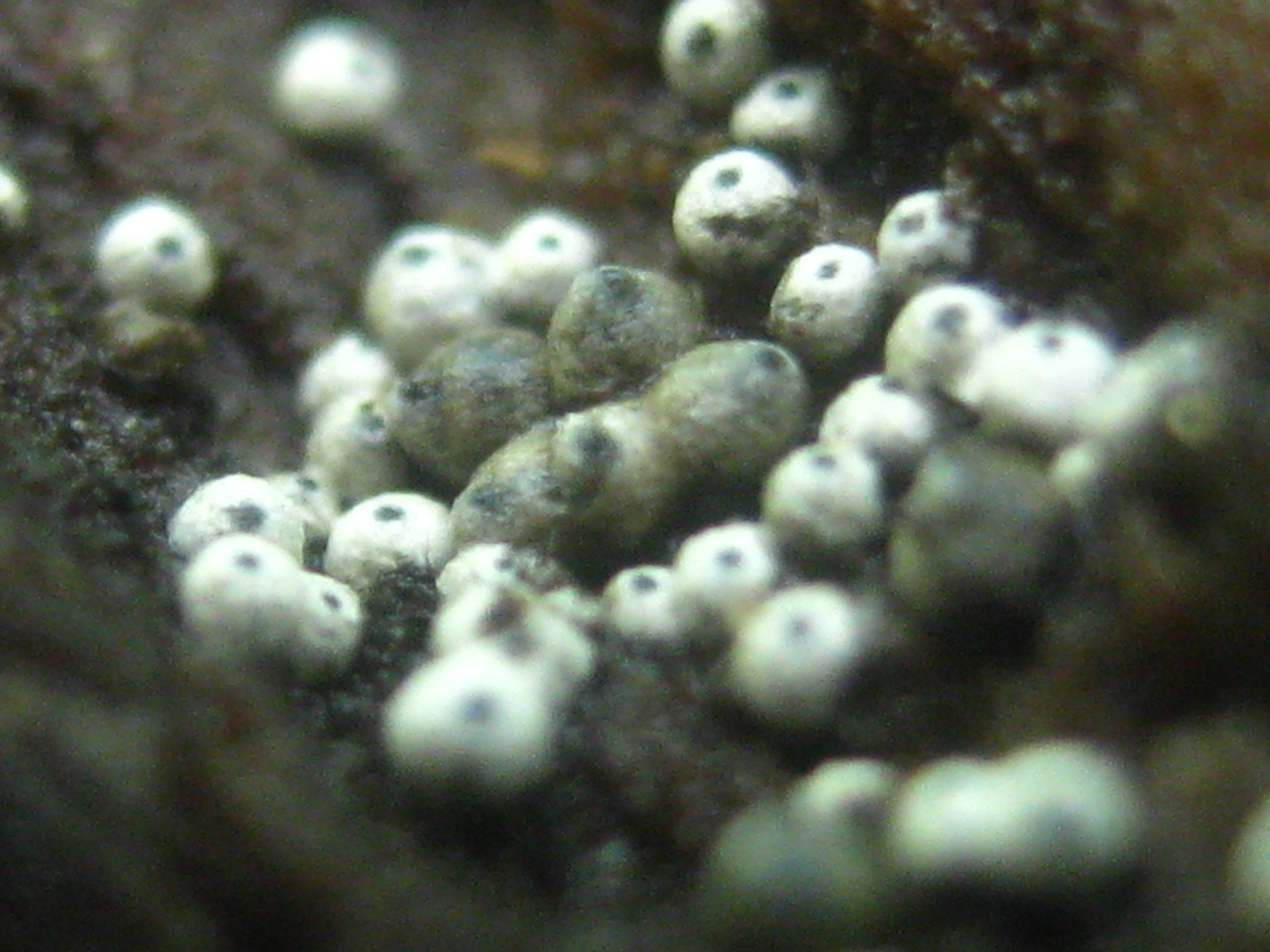

Scientific classification
- Kingdom: Fungi
- Division: Ascomycota
- Class: Sordariomycetes
- Order: Sordariales
- Family: Lasiosphaeriaceae; Nannf.

Type genus
- Lasiosphaeria Ces. & De Not.

= Lasiosphaeriaceae =

Family of fungi

The Lasiosphaeriaceae are a family of fungi in the Ascomycota, class Sordariomycetes.

== Genera ==
- Anopodium
- Apiosordaria
- Apodospora
- Apodus
- Arecacicola
- Arniella
- Arnium
- Bombardia
- Bombardioidea
- Camptosphaeria
- Cercophora
- Diffractella
- Diplogelasinospora
- Emblemospora
- Eosphaeria
- Fimetariella
- Jugulospora
- Lacunospora
- Lasiosphaeria
- Periamphispora
- Podospora
- Pseudocercophora
- Schizothecium
- Strattonia
- Thaxteria
- Triangularia
- Tripterosporella
- Zopfiella
- Zygopleurage
- Zygospermella
