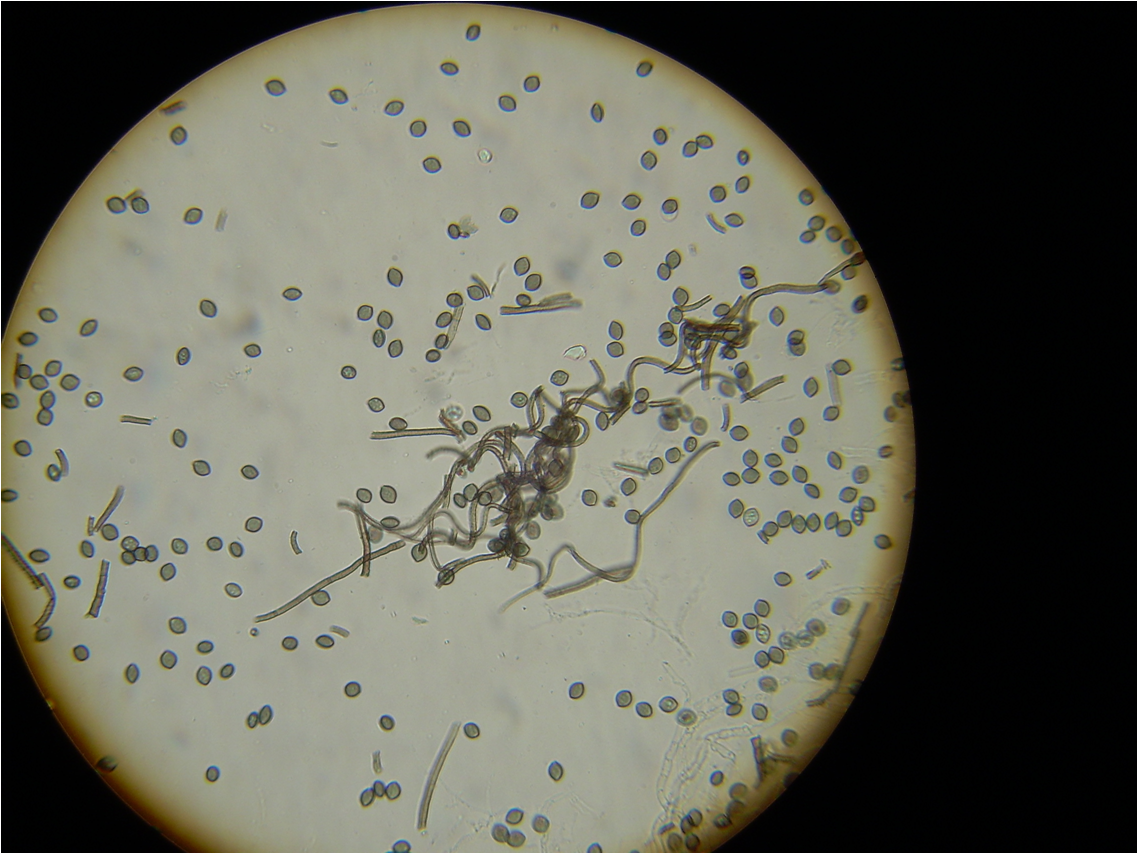
- Chaetomium sp.

Scientific classification
- Kingdom: Fungi
- Division: Ascomycota
- Class: Sordariomycetes
- Subclass: Sordariomycetidae
- Order: Sordariales

Families
- Bombardiaceae; Chaetomiaceae; Diplogelasinosporaceae; Lasiosphaeriaceae; Naviculisporaceae; Neoschizotheciaceae; Podosporaceae; Sordariaceae; Strattoniaceae; Zygospermellaceae

= Sordariales =

Order of fungi

The order Sordariales is one of the most diverse taxonomic groups within the Sordariomycetes (subdivision Pezizomycotina, division Ascomycota).

Species in the order Sordariales have a broad range of ecological diversity, containing lignicolous, herbicolous and coprophilous taxa. Most Sordariales are saprobic, producing solitary perithecial ascomata. They are commonly found on dung or decaying plant matter. The order contains a number of ecologically important species, including the model filamentous fungal genera Podospora and Neurospora, as well as potentially industrial-relevant fungi, such as members of the Chaetomiaceae family, which often produce biologically active secondary metabolites. The order Sordariales furthermore contains the highest diversity of thermophilic fungal species, with isolates present in seven different genera.

== Families in the order Sordariales ==
Recent phylogenetic studies have aimed to contribute to the natural classification of this order. The most recent phylogenetic tree divides the order into eleven families, based on molecular data from four marker genes.

- Bombardiaceae (includes Apodospora (6), Bombardia (43), Bombardioidea (5), Fimetariella (9) and Ramophialophora (4) )
- Chaetomiaceae
- Diplogelasinosporaceae (includes Diplogelasinospora Cain (4) )
- Lasiosphaeriaceae
- Lasiosphaeridaceae
- Naviculisporaceae (includes Areotheca (2), Naviculispora (1), Pseudorhypophila (3) and Rhypophila (4) }
- Neoschizotheciaceae (includes Apodus (2), Cercophora (77), Echria (2), Immersiella (2), Jugulospora (1), Neoschizothecium (10), Rinaldiella (1) and Zygopleurage (3) )
- Podosporaceae (includes Lundqvistomyces (2), Pseudoechria (4) and Pseudoschizothecium (1) )
- Sordariaceae
- Strattoniaceae (includes Strattonia)
- Zygospermellaceae (includes Episternus (1) and Zygospermella (3) )

== Genera incertae sedis ==
There are many genera in the Sordariomycetes that are not well known, and are of uncertain familial classification. These include:

- Abyssomyces Kohlm – 1 sp.
- Acanthotheciella Höhn. – 3 spp.
- Arnium Nitschke ex G.Winter – 34 spp.
- Ascolacicola Ranghoo & K.D.Hyde – 1 sp.
- Biconiosporella Schaumann – 1 sp.
- Bombardiella Höhn. – 1 sp.
- Camptosphaeria Fuckel – 4 spp.
- Coronatomyces Dania García, Stchigel & Guarro – 1 sp.
- Cuspidatispora Shearer & Bartolata – 1 sp.
- Diffractella Guarro, P.F.Cannon & Aa – 1 sp.
- Emblemospora Jeng & J.C.Krug – 2 spp.
- Eosphaeria Höhn. – 2 spp.
- Globosphaeria D.Hawksw. – 1 sp.
- Isia D.Hawksw & Manohar – 2 spp.
- Lockerbia K.D.Hyde – 2 spp.
- Lunulospora Ingold – 2 spp.
- Madurella Brumpt – 3 spp.
- Onygenopsis Henn. – 1 sp.
- Periamphispora J.C.Krug – 1 sp.
- Phaeosporis Clem. – 2 spp.
- Reconditella Matzer & Hafellner – 1 sp.
- Rhexodenticula W.A.Baker & Morgan-Jones – 5 spp.
- Rhexosporium Udagawa & Furuya – 1 sp.
- Roselliniomyces Matzer & Hafellner – 7 spp.
- Roselliniopsis Matzer & Hafellner – 7 spp.
- Synaptospora Cain – 5 spp.
- Tripterosporella Subram. & Lodha – 5 spp.
- Utriascus Réblová – 1 sp.
- Ypsilonia Lév. – 3 spp.
