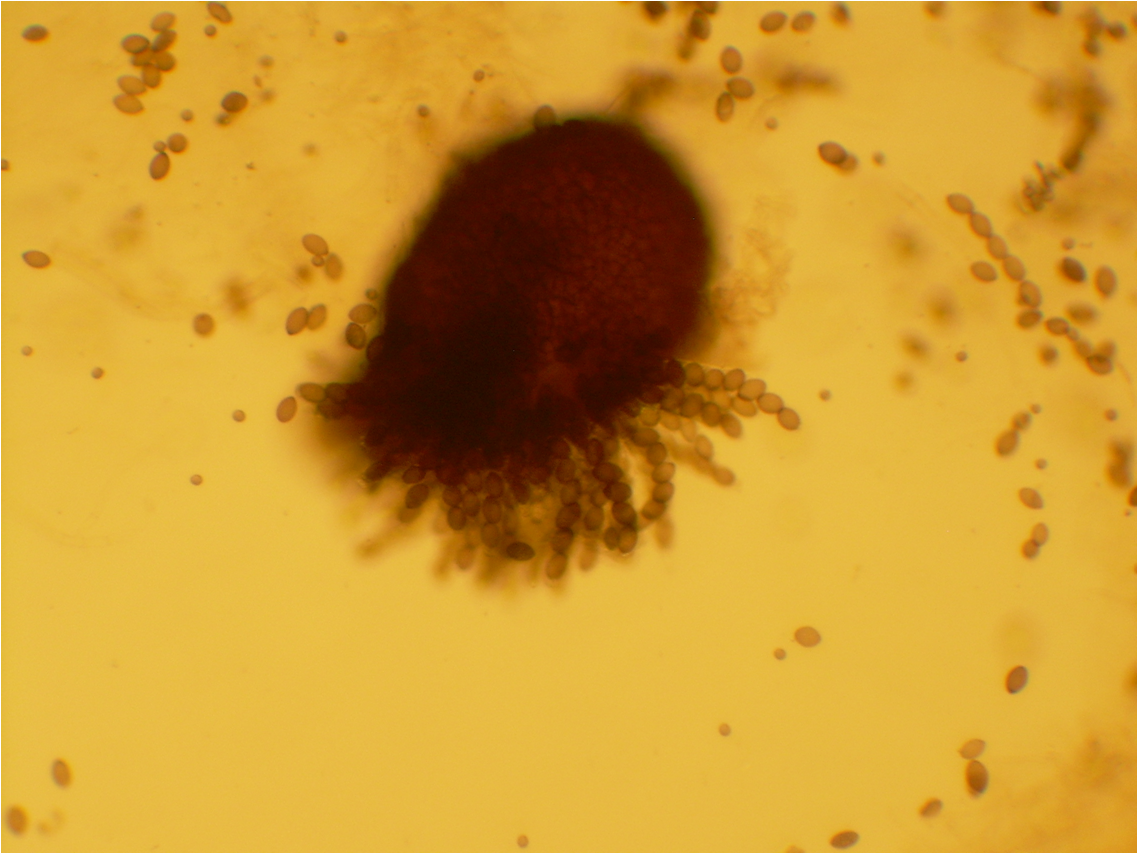
- Sordaria fimicola perithecium

Scientific classification
- Kingdom: Fungi
- Division: Ascomycota
- Class: Sordariomycetes
- Order: Sordariales
- Family: Sordariaceae
- Genus: Sordaria
- Species: S. fimicola

Binomial name
- Sordaria fimicola (Roberge ex Desm.) Ces. & De Not.

= Sordaria fimicola =

Species of fungus

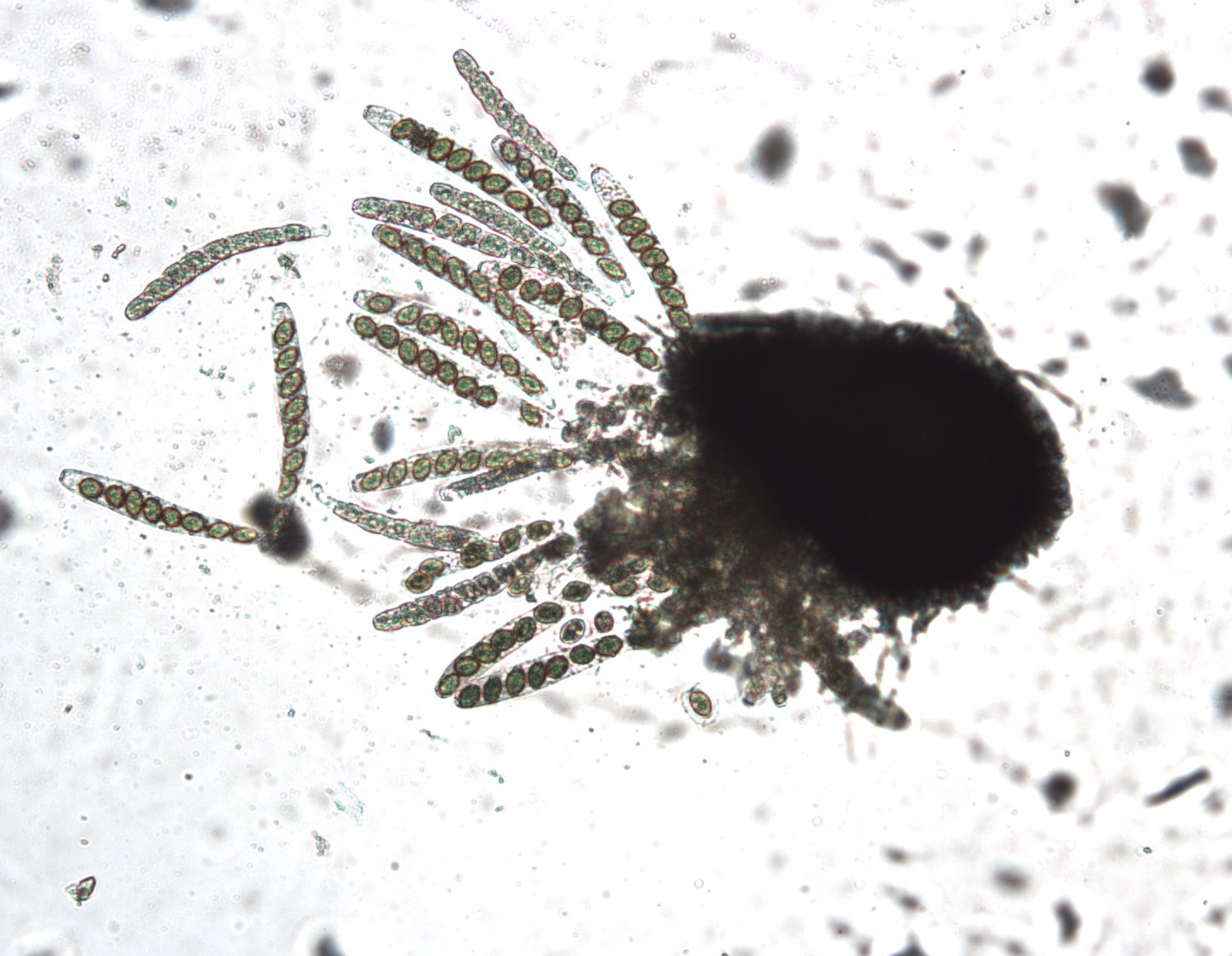
Image taken at 100x

Sordaria fimicola is a species of microscopic fungus. It is commonly found in the feces of herbivores. Sordaria fimicola is often used in introductory biology and mycology labs because it is easy to grow on nutrient agar in dish cultures. The genus Sordaria, closely related to Neurospora and Podospora, is a member of the large class Sordariomycetes, or flask-fungi. The natural habitat of the three species of Sordaria that have been the principal subjects in genetic studies is dung of herbivorous animals. The species S. fimicola is common and worldwide in distribution. The species of Sordaria are similar morphologically, producing black perithecia containing asci with eight dark ascospores in a linear arrangement. These species share a number of characteristics that are advantageous for genetic studies. They all have a short life cycle, usually 7–12 days, and are easily grown in culture. Most species are self-fertile and each strain is isogenic. All kinds of mutants are easily induced and readily obtainable with particular ascospore color mutants. These visual mutants aid in tetrad analysis, especially in analysis of intragenic recombination.

The most common form of S. fimicola is a dark brown. Certain mutants are grey or tan. A common experiment for an introductory biology lab class is to cross one of the mutant types with a wild type and observe the ratio of coloring in the offspring. This experiment illustrates the concepts of genetic inheritance in a haploid organism. The eight ascospores are produced inside an ascus. Sordaria squashes can give us information about crossing over during meiosis. If no crossing over occurs a 4:4 pattern is produced: four black spores, and four tan spores all lined up. If crossing over does occur there is a 2:2:2:2 pattern visible, or a 2:4:2 pattern.

Another common lab use is to observe meiosis and mitosis in the fruit bodies, called perithecia. An interesting feature of S. fimicola is that its fruit body is phototrophic. Thus, as it grows the stalk will bend toward a light source and when the sac bursts, the spores are shot towards the light.

== Taxonomy ==
Research to update Sordariomycete fungal taxonomy is ongoing, and the position of Sordaria fimicola within the taxonomy of the Sordariomycetes is being researched and updated. The sordariomycetes are known as the flask fungi because they are characterized by flask-shaped perithecia and unitunicate asci. Phylogenetic studies of partial 18s ribosomal DNA strands has illuminated the phylogeny of the Sordariomycetes. Morphological features that characterize the Sordariaceae include the differentiation of the hyphal envelope that surrounds the ascogonium into peripheral wall layers and a pseudoparenchymatous centrum. Broad paraphyses composed of delicate, multinucleate cells arise from the cells of the centrum and completely fill the perithecium, crushing the remaining pseudoparenchymatous cells against the perithecial wall. S. fimicola differs from other species of Sordariaceae studied in the aggregation of the ascogenous cells to form a placenta‐like mass in the base of the centrum. Consequently, the asci arise in a cluster rather than in a uniform wall layer.

== Fungal morphology ==
Sordaria fimicola is an ascomycete fungus that grows well on nutrient agar, dung, and in decaying matter in soil. As an ascoymcete it has a sexual teleomorph form and an asexual anamorph form. S. fimicola typically follows the life cycle of an obligate dung fungus; sexual reproduction that is obligate to herbivore dung after passage through the herbivore's gastrointestinal tract. Following meiosis on dung, ascospores are discharged and stick onto plant surfaces where they are thought to remain epiphyllous. S. fimicola grows septate hyphae which at the macro level look like small dark brown fibers forming a fluffy sheet over the substrate. Small black spots will form when sexual reproduction occurs, as these spots are the location of the ascii. Additionally, there are tan and grey mutant strains of S. fimicola. S. fimicola grows best in carbon rich substrates, but it also needs access to nitrogen. Research has shown that S. fimicola grows best with a carbon:nitrogen ratio between 5:1 and 10:1, as S. fimicola grown under these conditions produces markedly more perithecium than in those with higher carbon ratios or higher nitrogen ratios. S. fimicola grows well in a laboratory setting and because of that it is often used in introductory biology laboratories and also as a model organism for research. S. fimicola is also a good tool for teaching meiosis as it quickly produces diploid perithecium which undergoes meiosis to produce ascii with ordered linear tetrads of haploid ascospores.

== Ecology ==
Although S. fimicola was traditionally understood to grow on the dung of herbivorous animals or in decaying plant matter, it has also been discovered that it grows symbiotically with some plants. New research shows that S. fimicola is a facultative dung fungus and S. fimicola has been found to grow among the roots of rye-grass and wheat-grass. In sterilized and unsterilized soil, S. fimicola promoted host growth and prevented mortality. Research shows that S. fimicola in potato dextrose cultures is capable of producing triacontanol and indole-3-carboxaldehyde, both of which have antibacterial properties that may help prevent host disease.

S. fimicola has also been shown to inhibit the growth of other species of fungi which are pathogenic to plants including Pestalotiopsis guepinii, Colletotrichum capsici, Curvularia lunata [Cochliobolus lunatus], Alternaria alternata and Fusarium oxysporum.

S. fimicola has also been shown to negatively affect the health of some plants that it can be found growing on. When S. fimicola was first isolated from maize researchers believed that it was most likely an opportunistic pathogen. Healthy maize plants in the laboratory did not grow S. fimicola indicating that healthy maize plants may exclude it. S. fimicola did colonize healthy B. tectorum resulting in reduced fecundity and reduced growth.

S. fimicola is also phototropic and the response is twofold: 1) the number of fruiting bodies produced by the fungus is influenced by light and 2) the direction which the fruiting bodies grow is also influenced. This response is likely mediated by a specific fungal receptor called the S. fimicola white collar-1 photoreceptor (SfWC-1). Other species of phototropic fungi have homologous receptors with similar receptor domains. S. fimicola with a non-functional mutant SfWC-1 receptor had delayed and less-pronounced fruiting-body formation, was defective in phototropism of the perithecial beaks, and lacked the fruiting-body zonation pattern compared with the wild type.

== Gene conversion ==
Each individual meiosis generates four haploid products, and after one further round of mitosis, eight products are formed and all retained as haploid spores within the sac-like ascus (pl. asci). The retention of the products of an individual meiosis in an individual ascus has facilitated certain kinds of genetic analyses, particularly the analysis of the molecular mechanism of genetic recombination. When a wild type (+) strain is mated with a mutant (m) strain, ordinarily each ascus will contain a pattern of four + and four m spores. However, it was found that, with low frequency, some asci had ratios that differed from the expected 4+ : 4m (e.g. 6+: 2m or 2+: 6m or even 5+: 3m or 3+: 5m). In these cases it appeared that the m gene had been converted to the + gene or vice versa. And so the phenomenon was termed "gene conversion." Gene conversion was first detected in S. fimicola in 1951 by Lindsay Olive, and definitively characterized by him in 1959. Olive considered that these gene conversion events resulted from "trans replication, by which a locus is copied more than the normal number of times during replication at meiotic prophase." Since then many studies on the gene conversion phenomenon were carried out with S. fimicola and other organisms, particularly other ascomycetes [see review by Whitehouse (1982)]. Efforts to understand gene conversion at the molecular level have provided important insights into the mechanism and adaptive function of meiotic recombination, which in turn bears on the adaptive function of sexual reproduction.

== Images ==
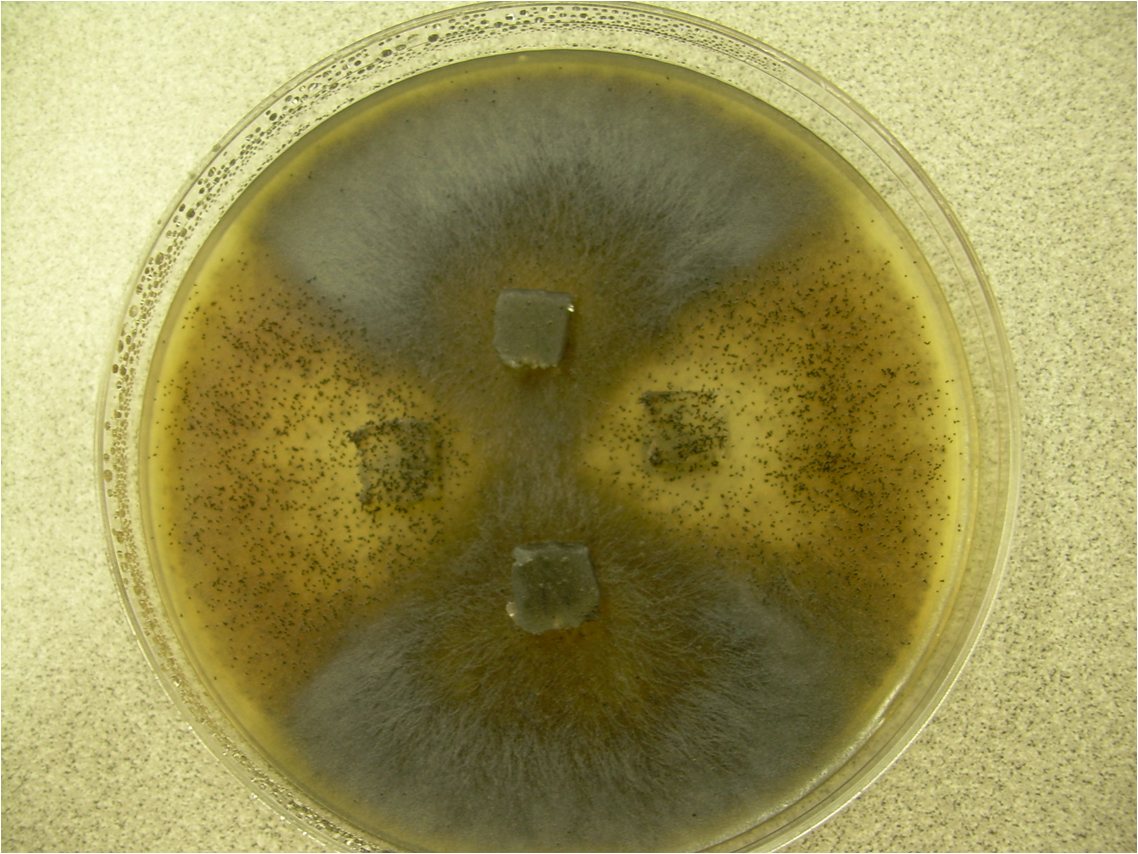
A mating between wild-type (dark brown) and mutant (tan) Sordaria fimicola colonies

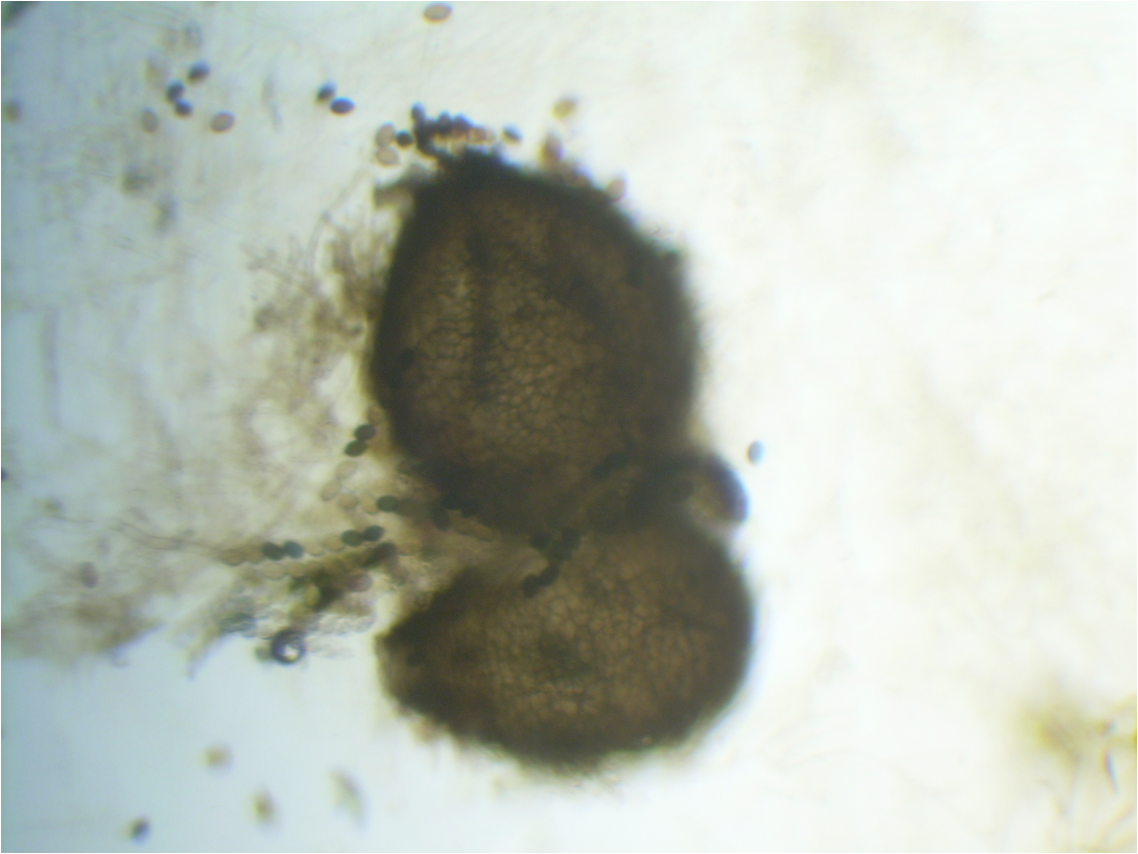
Sordaria fimicola perithecia with both mutant and wild-type ascospores

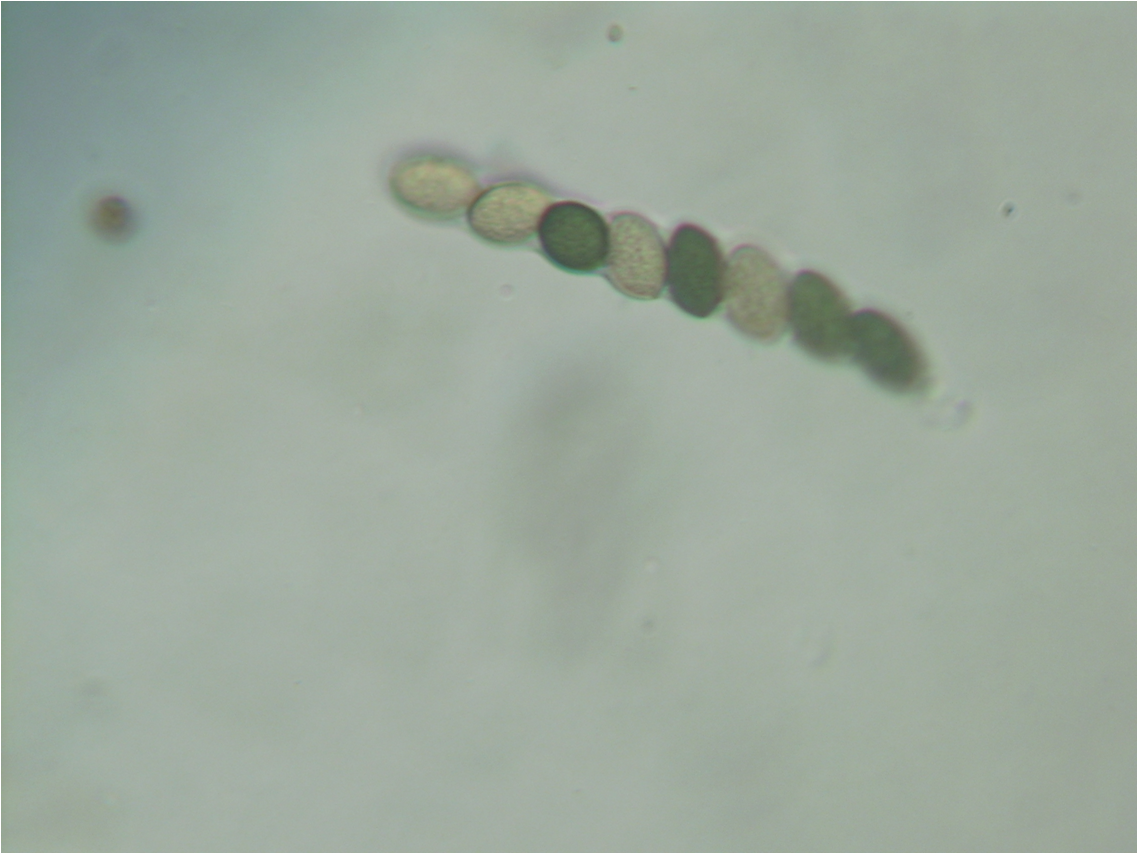
A Sordaria fimicola ascus with an unusual 2:1:1:1:1:2 pattern
