= Pirone =

Surname

Pirone is an Italian surname. Notable people with the surname include:

- Pascal Pompey Pirone (1907 - 2003), American botanist, plant pathologist, urban horticulturalist, science communicator, and author
- Valeria Pirone (born 1998), Italian professional footballer

== See also ==
- Peroni (disambiguation)
