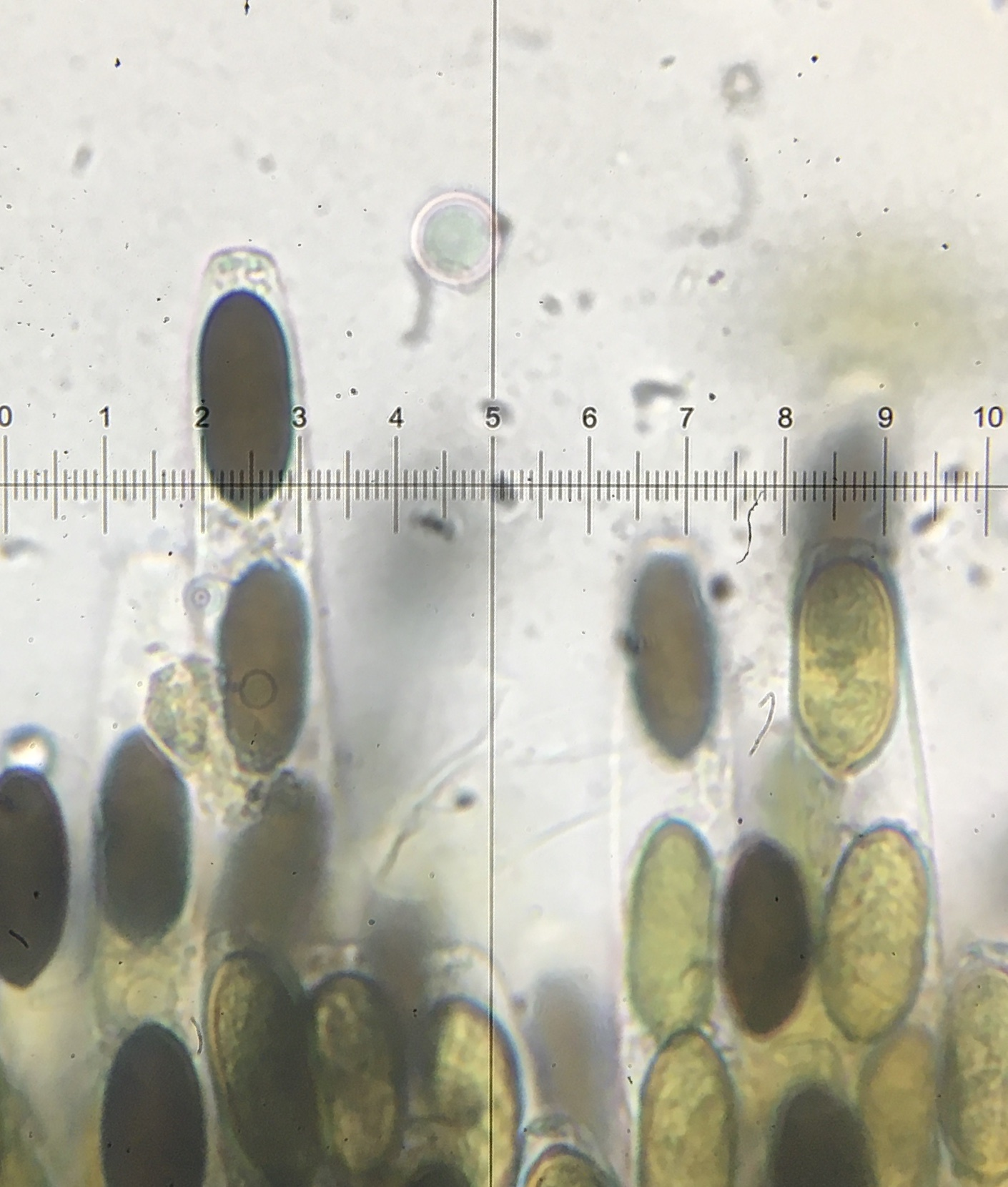

Scientific classification
- Domain: Eukaryota
- Kingdom: Fungi
- Division: Ascomycota
- Class: Sordariomycetes
- Order: Sordariales
- Family: Sordariaceae
- Genus: Sordaria
- Species: S. alcina

Binomial name
- Sordaria alcina N.Lundq.

= Sordaria alcina =

Species of fungus

Sordaria alcina is a species of fungus from the genus Sordaria.
