= Beta-apo-4'-carotenal oxygenase =

Identifiers
- EC no.: 1.2.1.82

Databases
- IntEnz: IntEnz view
- BRENDA: BRENDA entry
- ExPASy: NiceZyme view
- KEGG: KEGG entry
- MetaCyc: metabolic pathway
- PRIAM: profile
- PDB structures: RCSB PDB PDBe PDBsum
Search
- PMC: articles
- PubMed: articles
- NCBI: proteins

Beta-apo-4'-carotenal oxygenase (EC 1.2.1.82, beta-apo-4'-carotenal dehydrogenase, YLO-1, carD (gene)) is an enzyme with systematic name 4'-apo-beta,psi-carotenal:NAD^{+} oxidoreductase. This enzyme catalyses the following chemical reaction:

4'-apo-beta, psi-caroten-4'-al + NAD^{+} + H2O $\rightleftharpoons$ neurosporaxanthin + NADH + 2 H^{+}

Neurosporaxanthin is responsible for the orange color of Neurospora.
