= Nectriella pironii =

Scientific classification
- Domain: Eukaryota
- Kingdom: Fungi
- Division: Ascomycota
- Class: Sordariomycetes
- Order: Hypocreales
- Family: Bionectriaceae
- Genus: Nectriella
- Species: N. pironii

Binomial name
- Nectriella pironii Alfieri & Samuels, (1980)

Species of fungus

Nectriella pironii is a plant pathogen. It parasitizes Aphelandra squarrosa, Clerodendron bungei, Codiaeum variegatum, Jussiaea peruviana, Leucophyllum frutescens, Pittosporum tobria, Plumbago capensis, Chrysanthemum morifolium and Psychotria undata.

The species is named in honor of Pascal Pompey Pirone.

== Plant symptoms ==
Symptoms on leaves appear as slightly sunken spots surrounded by a dark brown edge. The center of the spot may appear pink from the spore masses which are being produced by the fungus. Frequently, large areas on the leaf turn brown, dry out along the leaf margins, and eventually the leaf falls off. Symptoms on fruit also develop as small, discolored, sunken areas that enlarge and develop pink spore masses in the center. Fruits that develop will soft rot and drop off the tree.

In chrysanthemum, the fungus will first produce an infection canker near the bottom of the stem after which the fungus most likely disturbed the plant hormonal system causing infected plants to grow taller than uninfected plants. In time, infected chrysanthemum plants will also show very typical blister like leasions on the leaves, making this disease quite easily recognisable (William Quaedvlieg, unpublished information).
