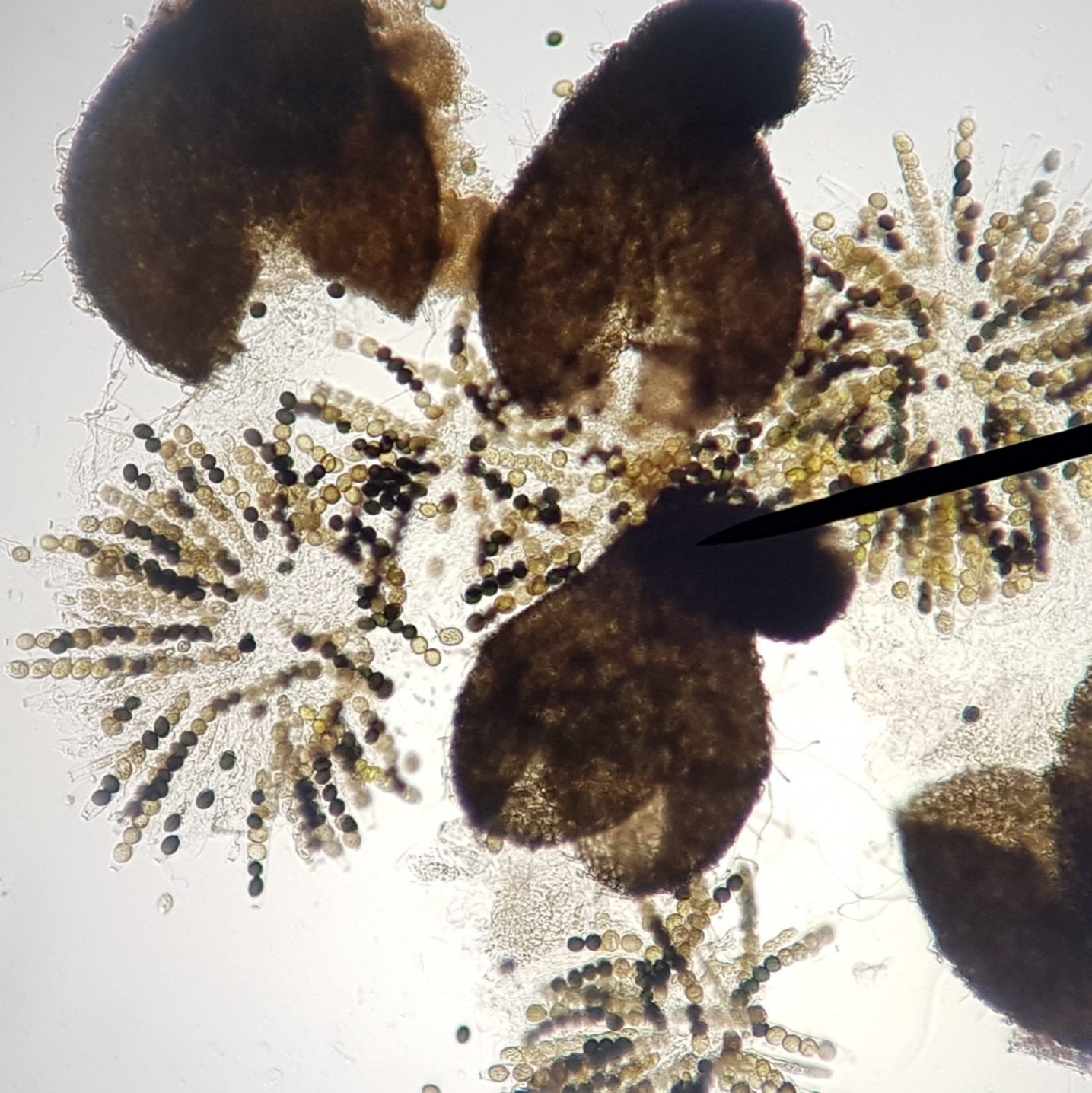
- Sordaria macrospora asci, optic microscopy under water ×100

Scientific classification
- Domain: Eukaryota
- Kingdom: Fungi
- Division: Ascomycota
- Class: Sordariomycetes
- Order: Sordariales
- Family: Sordariaceae
- Genus: Sordaria
- Species: S. macrospora

Binomial name
- Sordaria macrospora Auersw.

= Sordaria macrospora =

Species of fungus

Sordaria macrospora is a species of coprophilous (dung-colonizing) fungus. It is one of several fungal model organisms in biology, e.g. the model of fruiting body development in Ascomycetes. It is a homothallic, self-fertile organism.

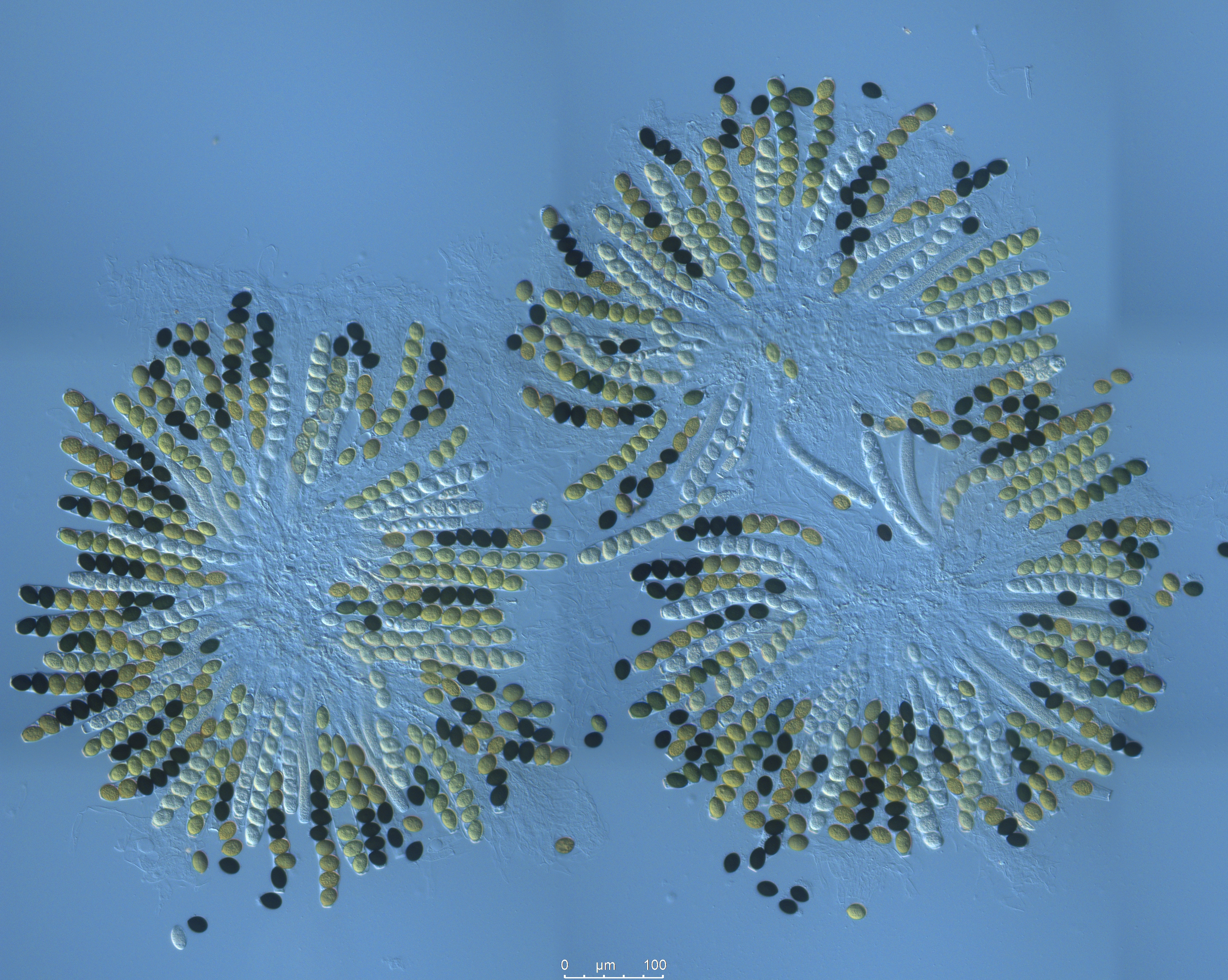
Ascospores issued from a diploid heterozygous at the spore-color locus, segregate as yellow and black. Different colors patterns reflect DNA recombination events during meiotic prophase. Lighter colors are due to incomplete maturation.
