= Cainiella =

Scientific classification
- Kingdom: Fungi
- Division: Ascomycota
- Class: Sordariomycetes
- Order: Diaporthales
- Family: Sydowiellaceae
- Genus: Cainiella; E.Müll. (1957)

Type species
- Cainiella johansonii (Rehm) E.Müll. (1957)

Species
- C. borealis M.E. Barr (1959); C. johansonii (Rehm) E. Müll. (1957)

Genus of fungi

Cainiella is a genus of fungi in the family Sordariaceae.

The genus name of Cainiella is in honour of Roy Franklin Cain (1906 - 1998), a Canadian botanist and Professor in Toronto.

The genus was circumscribed by Emil Müller in Sydowia Vol.10 on page 120 in 1957.
