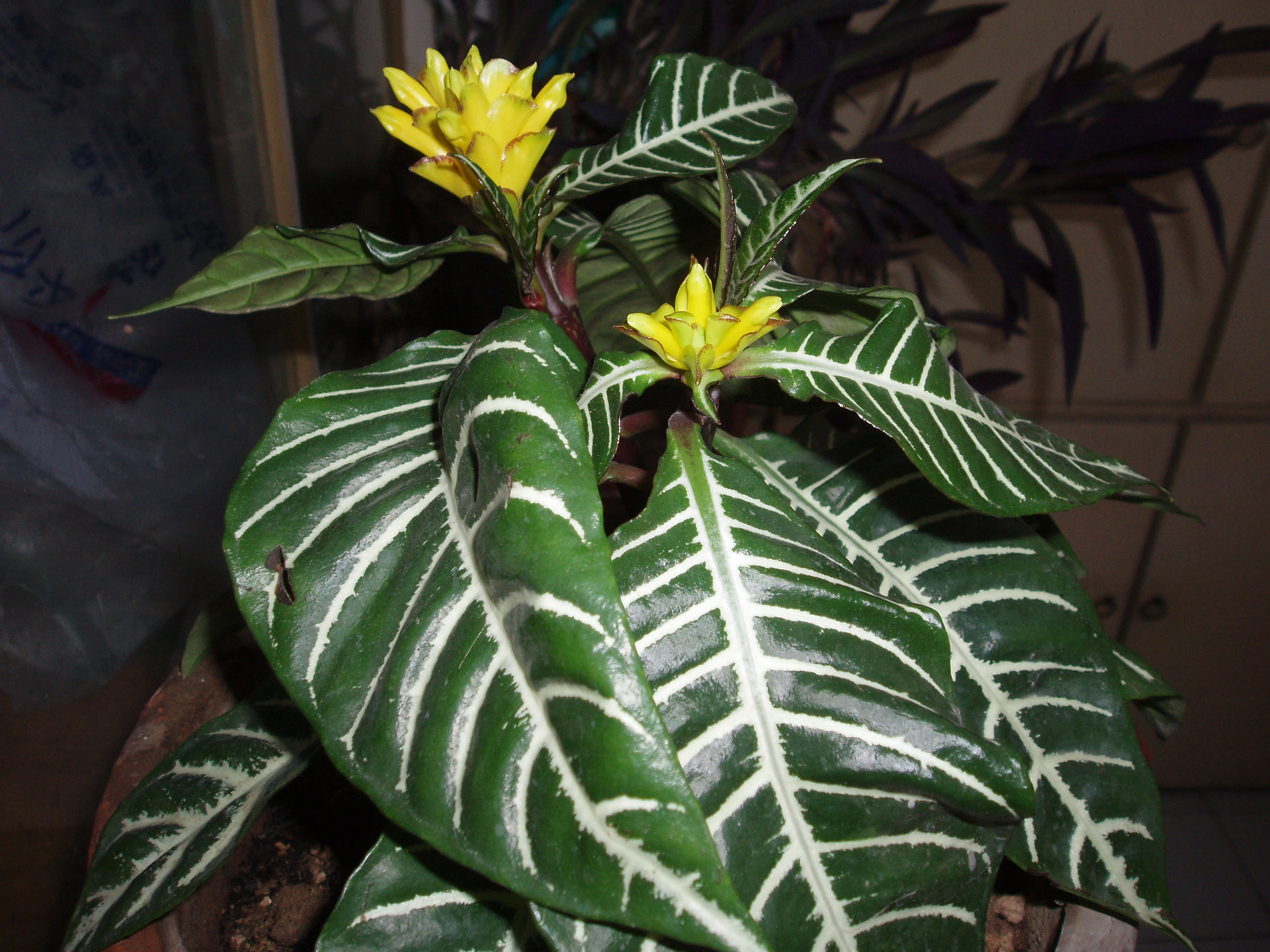
- Aphelandra squarrosa

Scientific classification
- Kingdom: Plantae
- Clade: Embryophytes
- Clade: Tracheophytes
- Clade: Angiosperms
- Clade: Eudicots
- Clade: Asterids
- Order: Lamiales
- Family: Acanthaceae
- Subfamily: Acanthoideae
- Tribe: Acantheae
- Genus: Aphelandra; R.Br. (1810)

Species
- 206, see text

Synonyms
- Amathea Raf. (1838); Aphelandrella Mildbr. (1926); Aphelandros St.-Lag. (1880), orth. var.; Encephalosphaera Lindau (1904); Geissomeria Lindl. (1827); Hemisandra Scheidw. (1842); Hemitome Nees (1847), not validly publ.; Hydromestus Scheidw. (1842); Lagochilium Nees (1847); Odontophyllum Sreem. (1977), nom. illeg.; Orophochilus Lindau (1897); Poecilocnemis Mart. ex Nees (1847); Rhombochlamys Lindau (1897); Sreemadhavana Rauschert (1982); Strobilorhachis Klotzsch (1839); Synandra Schrad. (1821), nom. illeg.

= Aphelandra =

Species of plant

Aphelandra is a genus of over 200 species of flowering plants in the family Acanthaceae, native to tropical regions of the Americas.

They are evergreen shrubs growing to 1–2 m (3 ft 3 in – 6 ft 7 in) tall, with opposite, simple leaves 5–30 cm (2–12 in) long, often with white veins. The flowers are produced in dense spikes, with brightly coloured bracts.

Several species are grown as houseplants for their patterned leaves and brightly coloured inflorescences.

== Pharmacological activity ==
Pharmacological reports on genus Aphelandra are Antibacterial activity, Antifungal activity and Immunomodulatory activity.

== Phytochemistry ==
Phytochemical reports on genus Aphelandra are Alkaloids, Flavonoids, Isoflavones, Benzoxazinoids-cyclic hydroxamic acid and their corresponding glucosides.

== Selected species ==
Accepted species include:

- Aphelandra albinotata Wassh.
- Aphelandra anderssonii Wassh.
- Aphelandra arnoldii Mildbr.
- Aphelandra attenuata Wassh.
- Aphelandra aurantiaca (Scheidw.) Lindl. (synonyms Aphelandra fascinator and Aphelandra nitens)
- Aphelandra azuayensis Wassh.
- Aphelandra bahiensis (Nees) Wassh.
- Aphelandra chamissoniana Nees
- Aphelandra chrysantha Wassh.
- Aphelandra cinnabarina Wassh.
- Aphelandra claussenii Wassh.
- Aphelandra colorata (Vell. Conc.) Wassh.
- Aphelandra dielsii Mildbr.
- Aphelandra dodsonii Wassh.
- Aphelandra eurystoma Mildbr.
- Aphelandra galba Wassh.
- Aphelandra guayasii Wassh.
- Aphelandra gunnari Wassh.
- Aphelandra harleyi Wassh.
- Aphelandra harlingii Wassh.

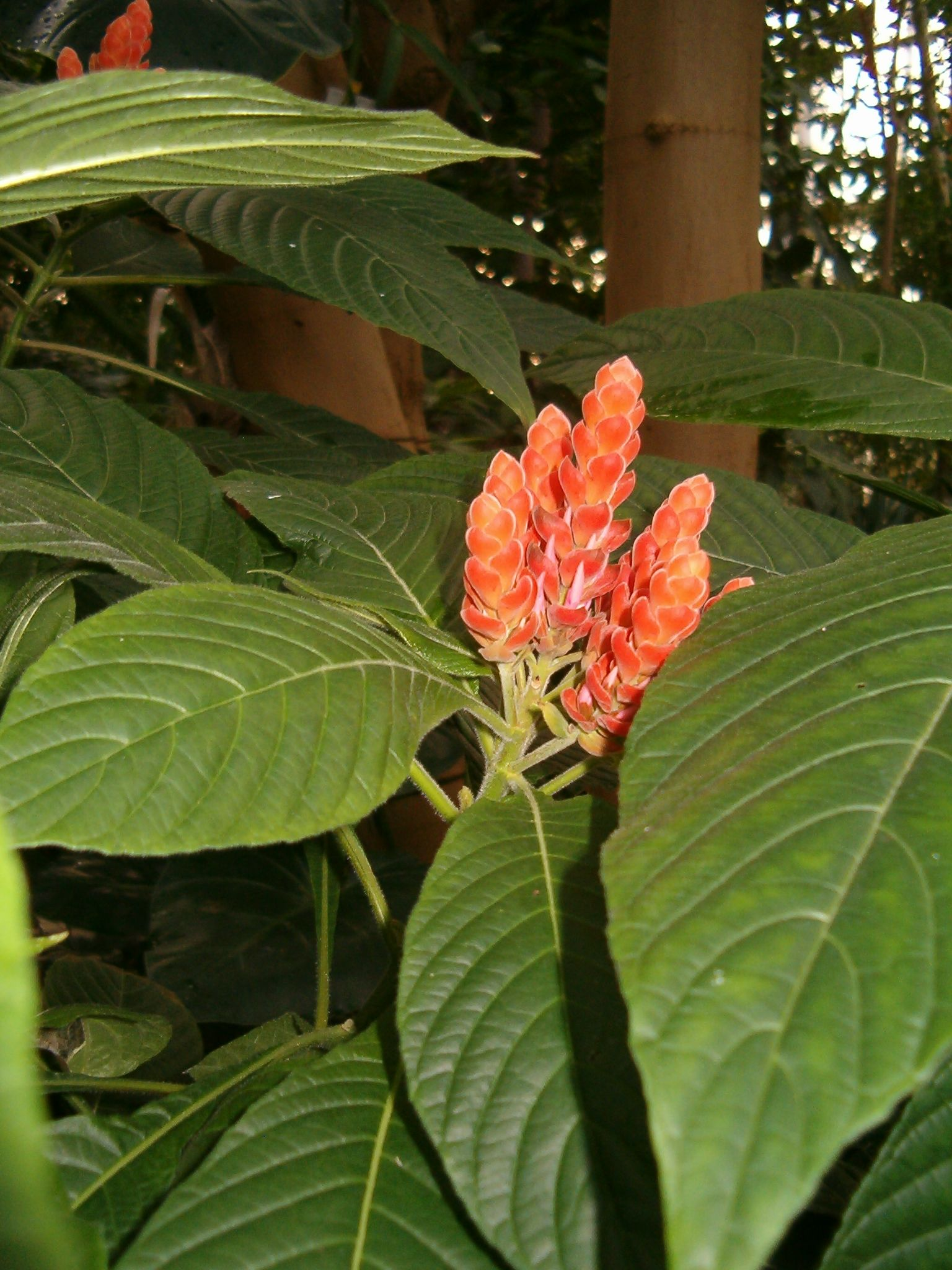
Aphelandra sinclairiana

- Aphelandra ignea (Schrader) Nees ex Steudel
- Aphelandra lasiandra (Mildbr.) McDade & E.A.Tripp
- Aphelandra lineariloba Leonard
- Aphelandra longiflora (Lindl.) Profice
- Aphelandra madrensis Lindau
- Aphelandra marginata Nees & Martius
- Aphelandra maximiliana (Nees) Benth
- Aphelandra mirabilis Rizzini
- Aphelandra modesta (Mildbr.) Wassh.
- Aphelandra neesiana Wassh.
- Aphelandra nemoralis Nees
- Aphelandra loxensis Wassh.
- Aphelandra nuda Nees
- Aphelandra obtusa (Nees) Wassh.
- Aphelandra obtusifolia (Nees) Wassh.
- Aphelandra paulensis Wassh.
- Aphelandra phaina Wassh.
- Aphelandra phrynioides Lindau
- Aphelandra rigida Glaz. ex Mildbr.
- Aphelandra schottiana (Nees) Profice
- Aphelandra sinclairiana Nees - Coral aphelandra
- Aphelandra squarrosa Nees (unplaced) – Zebra plant
- Aphelandra stephanophysa Nees
- Aphelandra sulphurea Hook.f.
- Aphelandra tetragona (Vahl) Nees
- Aphelandra tridentata Hemsl.
- Aphelandra viscosa Mildbr.
- Aphelandra weberbaueri Mildbr.
- Aphelandra zamorensis Wassh.
