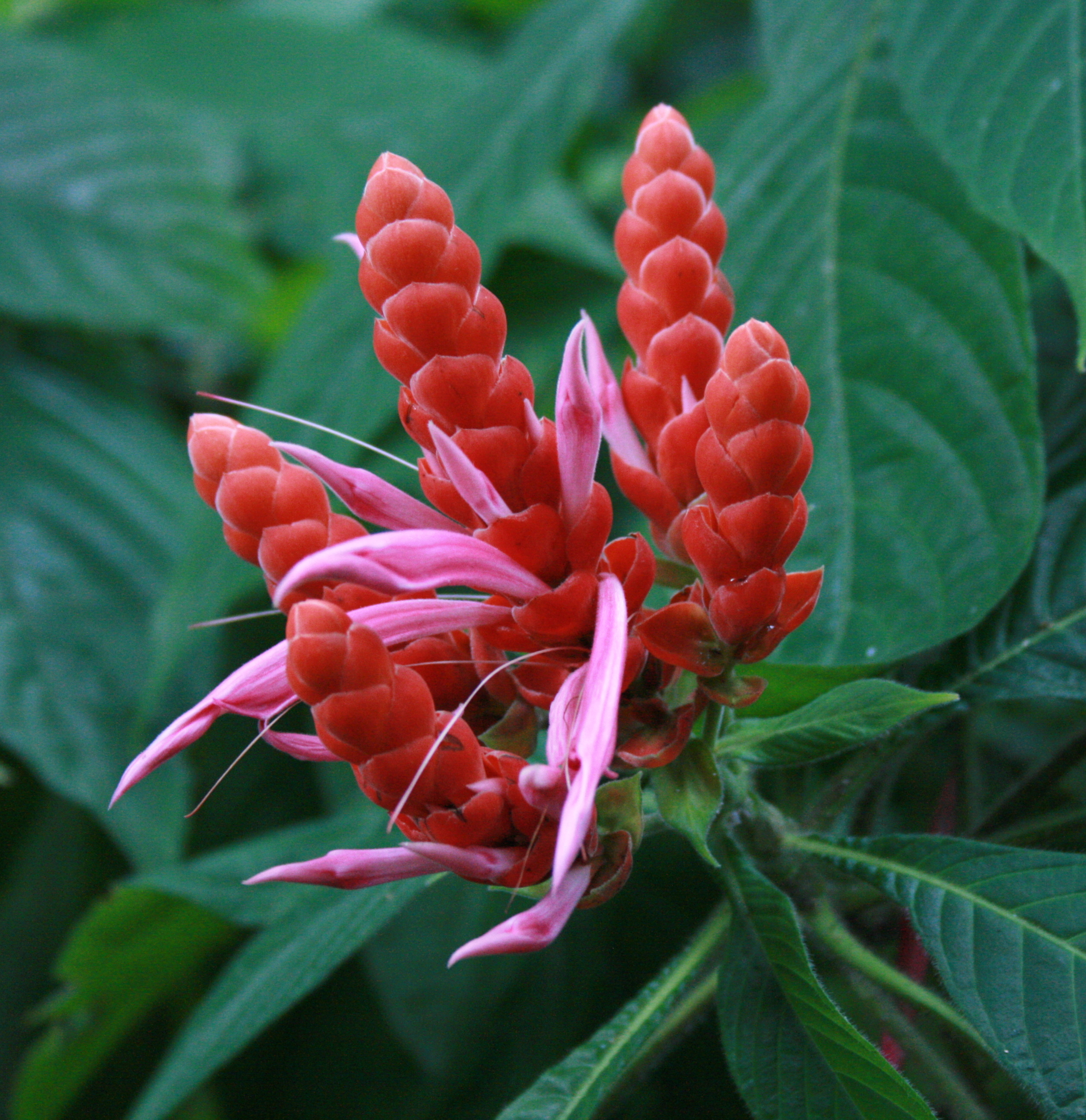

Scientific classification
- Kingdom: Plantae
- Clade: Tracheophytes
- Clade: Angiosperms
- Clade: Eudicots
- Clade: Asterids
- Order: Lamiales
- Family: Acanthaceae
- Genus: Aphelandra
- Species: A. sinclairiana

Binomial name
- Aphelandra sinclairiana Nees ex Benth.

= Aphelandra sinclairiana =

Species of flowering plant

Aphelandra sinclairiana is a plant species commonly called coral aphelandra, orange shrimp plant, Panama queen or Sinclair's aphelandra. It is a shrub up to 3 m (10 feet) high, native to Central America, specifically Panama, Costa Rica, Honduras and Nicaragua. It is also cultivated in warm locations elsewhere, with pink, red, orange, or red-violet flowers and bracts.

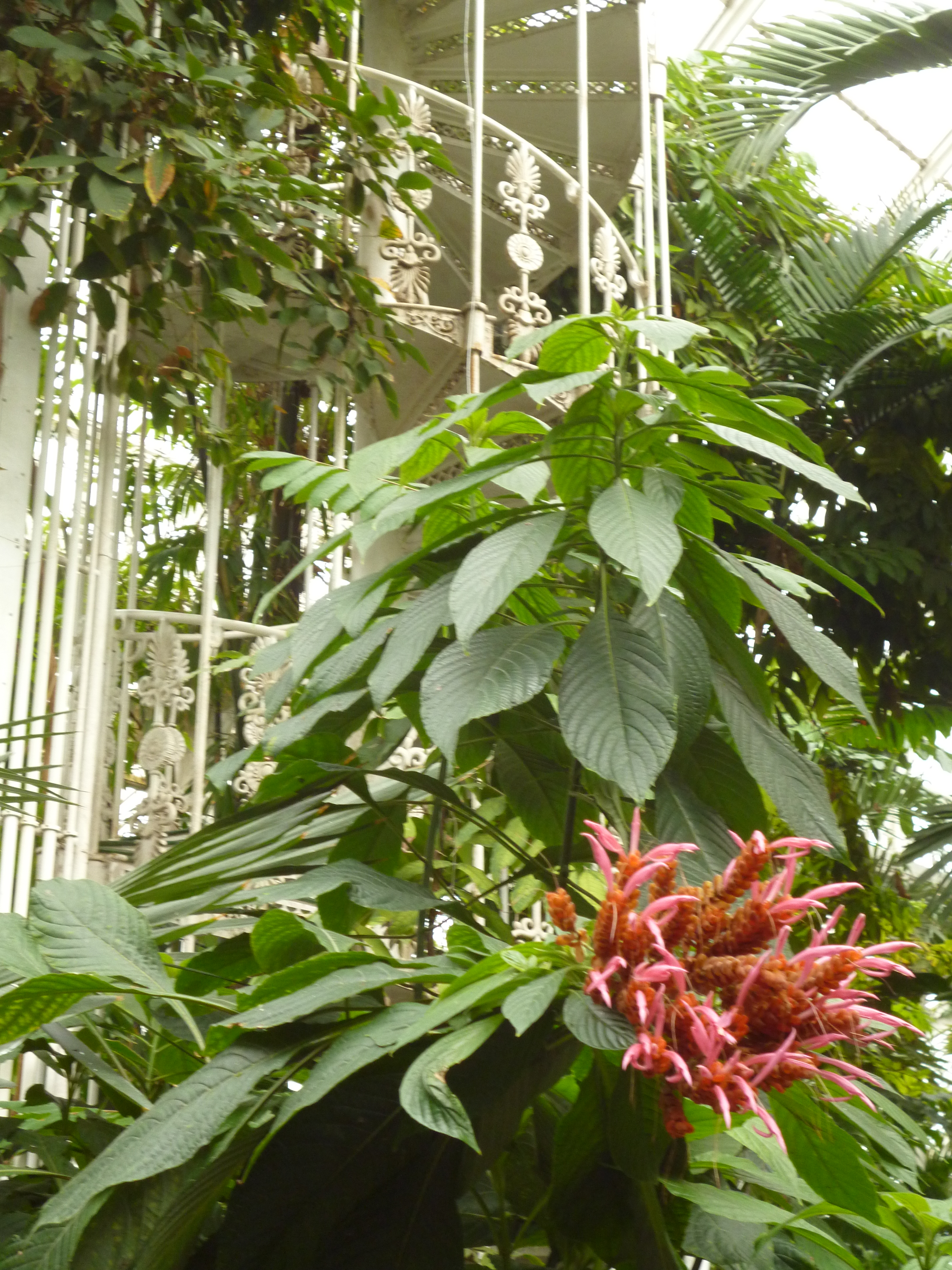
Bloom in the Palm House of Kew Gardens

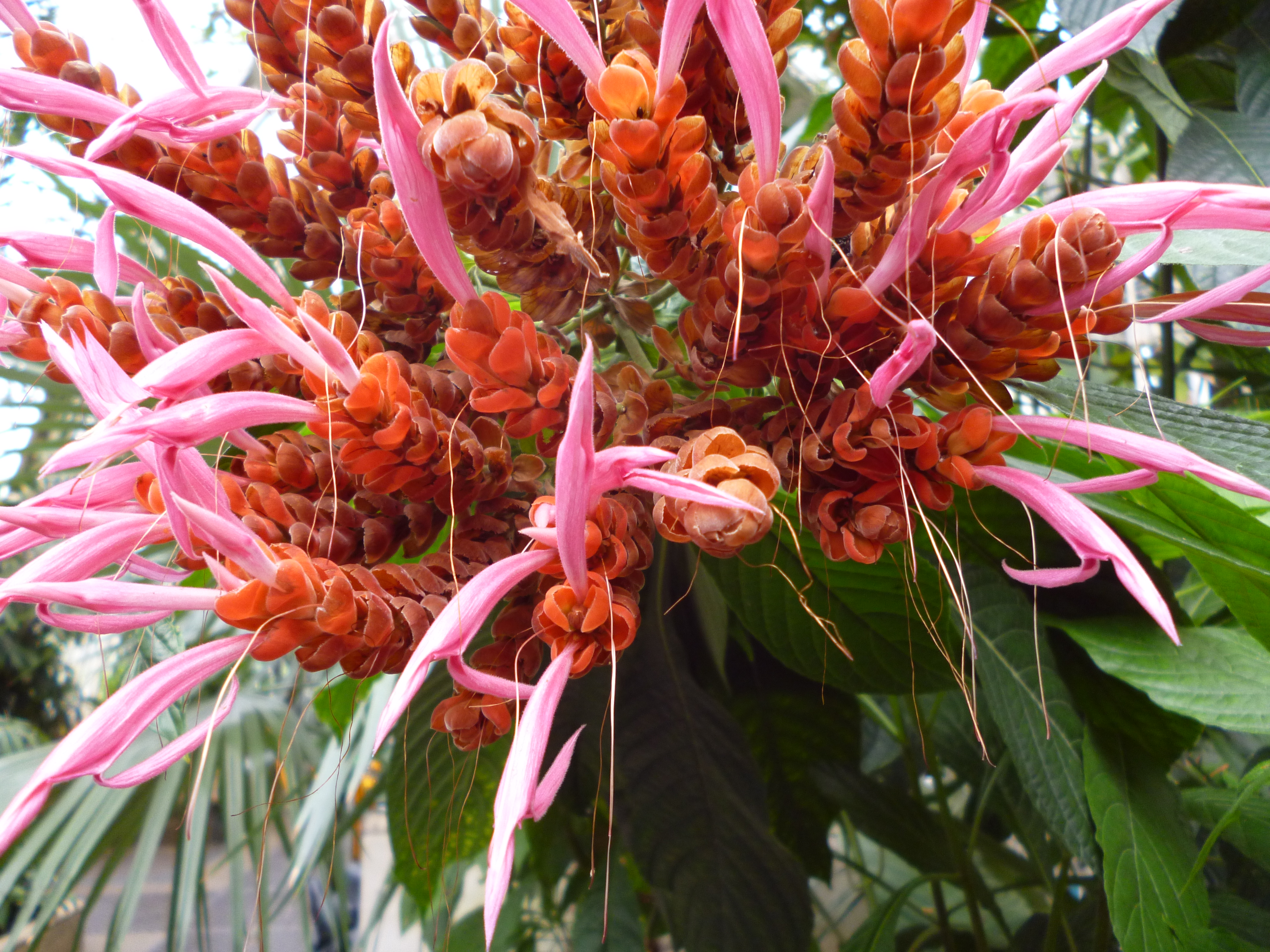
Closeup in Kew Gardens
