= Stellatospora =

Scientific classification
- Kingdom: Fungi
- Division: Ascomycota
- Class: Sordariomycetes
- Order: Sordariales
- Family: Sordariaceae
- Genus: Stellatospora; T. Ito & A. Nakagiri

Type species
- Stellatospora terricola Tad. Ito & Nakagiri

Genus of fungi

Stellatospora is a genus of fungi within the Sordariaceae family. This is a monotypic genus, containing the single species Stellatospora terricola, isolated from paddy soil in Japan.
