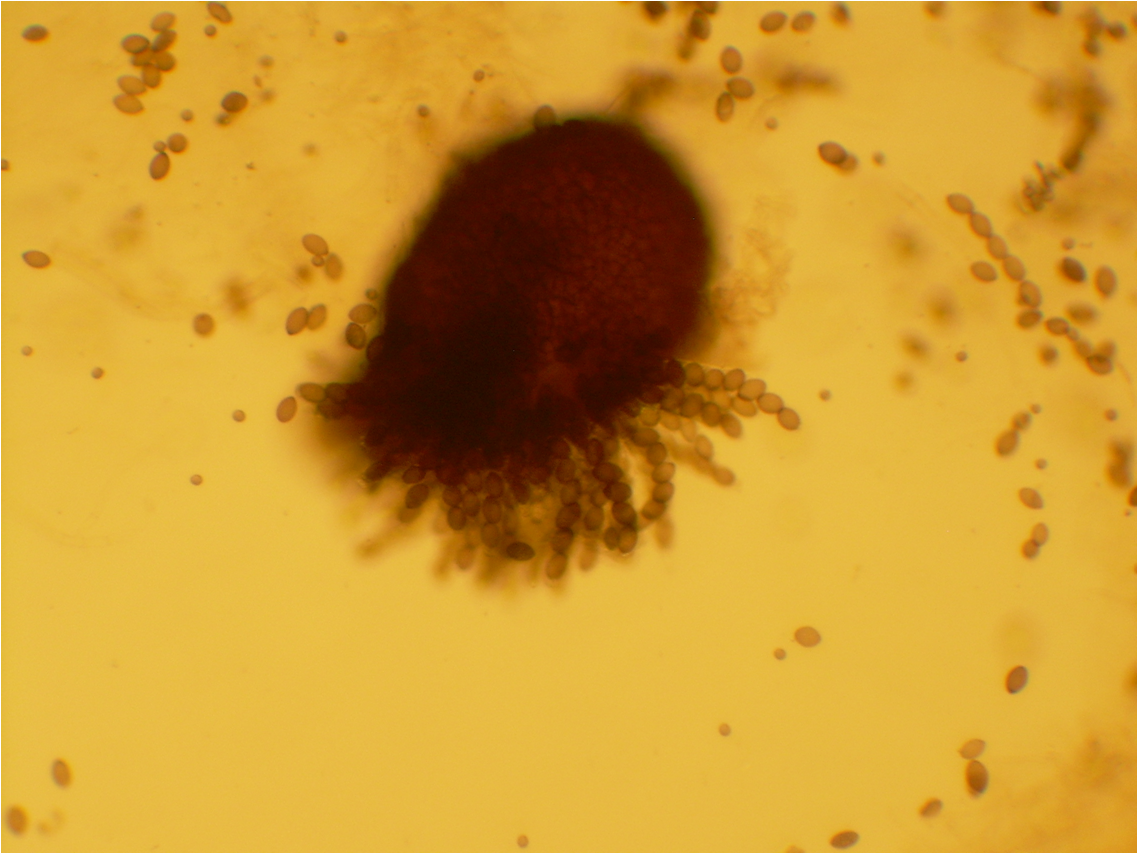
- Sordaria fimicola perithecium

Scientific classification
- Domain: Eukaryota
- Kingdom: Fungi
- Division: Ascomycota
- Class: Sordariomycetes
- Order: Sordariales
- Family: Sordariaceae
- Genus: Sordaria; Ces. & De Not.

Type species
- Sordaria fimicola (Roberge ex Desm.) Ces. & De Not.

Species
- Sordaria alcina; Sordaria fimicola; Sordaria macrospora

= Sordaria =

Genus of fungi

Sordaria is a genus of microscopic fungi. It is commonly found in the feces of herbivores. The genus has a widespread distribution, and contains 12 species.
