= Guilliermondia =

Scientific classification
- Kingdom: Fungi
- Division: Ascomycota
- Class: Sordariomycetes
- Order: Sordariales
- Family: Sordariaceae
- Genus: Guilliermondia; Dowding

Species
- G. elongata G. saccoboloides

Genus of fungi

Guilliermondia is a genus of fungi within the Sordariaceae family.

The genus is named in honour of Marie Antoine Alexandre Guilliermond (1876 - 1945), who was a French botanist (Mycology, Bryology and Zytology) and a professor in Lyon.

The genus was circumscribed by Jean Louis Émile Boudier in Bull. Soc. Mycol. France vol.20 on page 19 in 1904.
