= Pascal Pompey Pirone =

Pascal "Pat" Pompey Pirone (October 7, 1907 Mount Vernon, New York – January 11, 2003, Lexington, Kentucky) was a botanist, plant pathologist, urban horticulturalist, science communicator, and author.

== Biography ==
He grew up in Mount Vernon, New York. After graduating from A. B. Davis High School (now Mount Vernon High School), he matriculated in 1925 at Cornell University. There he was a member of the 1927 intercollegiate championship fencing team and the captain of the fencing team in his graduation year of 1929.

In 1933 he graduated from Cornell University with a Ph.D. in plant pathology. His doctoral dissertation has the title "Studies on the Leaf-blight of Carrots Caused by Macrosporium carotae Ell. & Lang." (Macrosporium carotae is a synonym for Alternaria carotae.) From 1933 to 1934 he worked for the U.S. Department of Agriculture in the Dutch elm disease eradication program. He was from 1934 to 1938 an assistant professor of plant pathology at Cornell University and from 1938 to 1947 an associate professor at Rutgers University. From 1947 until his retirement in 1974, he was a horticulturist and plant pathologist in charge of disease and insect control at the New York Botanical Garden (NYBG). He became the NYBG's Director of Education and taught adult education courses there. He was a frequent guest on radio programs such as The Garden Hot Line. (The Garden Hot Line was a weekly WOR (AM) radio show hosted by Ralph Snodsmith for 35 years.)

In the early years of his NYBG employment, Pirone conducted tests of pesticides to eradicate the Botryosphaeria ribis canker disease of London planes in New York City.

He investigated and treated many plant diseases such as begonia mildew, coleus wilt, and Rhododendron leaf-spot, and he researched the role of peat moss as a carrier of parasitic fungi. From his research he developed practical horticultural innovations such as methods of foliar feeding, i.e., the application of plant nutrients and antibiotics directly to foliage, and air-layering plants to develop roots above ground.

During WW II he was in charge of New Jersey's Victory Garden program.

He discovered several species of fungi and bacteria harmful to trees, lectured widely, and wrote hundreds of scientific and popular articles on plant diseases and pests, gardening, and plant care. He was the author of four books, two of which, Diseases and Pests of Ornamental Plants and Tree Maintenance, were the leading sources of information on those topics for several decades.

Pirone worked as a consultant for the New York City Department of Parks and Recreation, the Triborough Bridge Authority, Sleepy Hollow Restorations, country clubs, commercial florists, and many corporations, including General Motors, IBM, shipping lines, and public utilities companies.

He and his wife Loretta, who died in 1987, had three sons and a daughter. Thomas P. Pirone, one of the three sons, became a professor of plant pathology at the University of Kentucky. Albert Parella, known as the "Dahlia King of the Bronx", was a friend of the Pirone family and gave the names "Dr. P. P. Pirone" and "Loretta Pirone" to two varieties of dahlia.

== Fonds ==
The Mertz Library of the New York Botanical Garden has the Pascal P. Pirone fonds consisting of "correspondence, research papers, manuscripts, photographic material, artwork, reprints, and an audio recording." There are 16 files of general correspondence with correspondents, including Charles Barney Harding (stockbroker associated with Smith Barney & Co.), Howard S. Irwin, Ronald Lauder, Thomas P. Reilly (nurseryman who introduced "Ra-Pid-Gro Plant Food" in 1938 in Woolworth five-and-dime stores), and William J. Robbins.

== Awards and honors ==
- 1975 — Fellow of the American Phytopathogical Society
- 1980 — Award of Merit of the International Society of Arboriculture
- 1982 — Gold Medal of Horticulture of the New York State Nurseryman's Association

== Eponyms ==
- Nectriella pironii

== Selected publications ==
- Maintenance of shade and ornamental trees. New York: Oxford University Press. 1941. 2nd edition 1948.
  - Tree maintenance (3rd ed.). New York: Oxford University Press. 1959. (title changed from 2nd edition); 4th edition 1972; 5th edition 1978; 6th edition 1989 with Pascal Pirone as co-author.
  - Hartman, John; Pirone, Thomas P.; Sall, Mary Ann (2000). Pirone's Tree Maintenance. New York: Oxford University Press. ISBN 9780195119916. (This is a revision of the 6th edition with most of the revision written by John Hartman.)
- Modern gardening; a complete guide to the agricultural uses of modern chemistry's miracle drugs. Compiled under the editorial supervision of Maron J. Simon. New York: Simon and Schuster. 1952; 371 pages
- What's new in gardening. Garden City, N.Y.: Hanover House. 1956; 254 pages
- with Bernard Ogilvie Dodge and Harold William Rickett: Diseases and pests of ornamental plants (3rd ed.). New York: Ronald Press. 1960; Bernard O. Dodge and Harold W. Rickett (without Pirone) published the 1st edition in 1943 and the 2nd edition in 1948. 4th edition 1970 by Pirone and Dodge; 5th edition 1978 by Pirone.
- with Michael Rapuano and Brooks E. Wigginton: Open Space in Urban Design. Cleveland Development Foundation. 1964; 95 pages.
