= Aphelandra albinotata =

Conservation status
- Vulnerable (IUCN 3.1)

Scientific classification
- Kingdom: Plantae
- Clade: Tracheophytes
- Clade: Angiosperms
- Clade: Eudicots
- Clade: Asterids
- Order: Lamiales
- Family: Acanthaceae
- Genus: Aphelandra
- Species: A. albinotata

Binomial name
- Aphelandra albinotata Wassh.

Species of flowering plant

Aphelandra albinotata is a species of plant in the family Acanthaceae. It is endemic to Ecuador. Its natural habitat is subtropical or tropical moist montane forests. It is threatened by habitat loss.
