= Aphelandra schottiana =

Scientific classification
- Kingdom: Plantae
- Clade: Tracheophytes
- Clade: Angiosperms
- Clade: Eudicots
- Clade: Asterids
- Order: Lamiales
- Family: Acanthaceae
- Genus: Aphelandra
- Species: A. schottiana

Binomial name
- Aphelandra schottiana (Nees) Profice (2004)

Synonyms
- Geissomeria schottiana Nees (1847); Geissomeria schottiana f. floribunda Wawra (1883)

Species of flowering plant

Aphelandra schottiana is a species of flowering plant in the family Acanthaceae. It is a shrub native to eastern and southern of Brazil. This plant is cited in Flora Brasiliensis by Carl Friedrich Philipp von Martius.
