= Alexandre Guilliermond =

French botanist and mycologist (1876–1945)

Marie Antoine Alexandre Guilliermond (19 August 1876 – 1 April 1945) was a French botanist and mycologist who specialized in cytological studies of the yeasts, fungi, and algae. He was among the first to identify sexual reproduction in yeast and published a major review on the yeasts in 1912.

Born in Lyons to physician Jacques Guilliermond (1841-1878) and Madeleine Rollet (1856-1893), daughter of professor of hygiene Joseph Rollet, Guilliermond grew up with a numerous physicians in the family. He lost his father at a young age and after his mother remarried he grew up as a shy and reticent youth. He became interested in botany after joining the faculty of sciences at Lyon in 1897. He was influenced by the teaching of Maurice Caullery, Eugène Bataillon, and Louis Matruchot. He graduated in 1899 and began to study the yeasts, receiving a doctorate in 1902. He became a lecturer at the University of Paris in 1913 and became a chair of botany at Sorbonne in 1935 where he succeeded Pierre Augustin Dangeard.

Guilliermond identified isogamous copulation in the yeast Zygosaccharomyces chevalieri and the formation of an ascus in Schizosaccharomyces octosporus. Prior to his work, the vacuole and nucleus of yeast had been confused. He suggested a taxonomy of yeasts in 1928 with 22 genera which was based on morphology, presence or absence of ascospores and their ability to fermentation specific substrates.

A genus Guilliermondia (Mirangiaceae), and several species including Debaryomyces guilliermondii, Hanseniaspora guilliermondii, Saccharomyces guilliermondii, Zygosaccharomycodes guilliermondii, and Candida guilliermondii are named after him.
