= Nectriella =

Scientific classification
- Domain: Eukaryota
- Kingdom: Fungi
- Division: Ascomycota
- Class: Sordariomycetes
- Order: Hypocreales
- Family: Bionectriaceae
- Genus: Nectriella; Nitschke ex Fuckel (1870)

Type species
- Nectriella fuckelii Nitschke ex Fuckel (1870)

Species
- Species include: N. bloxamii; N. chrysites; N. consolationis; N. dacrymycella; N. exigua; N. laminariae; N. minuta; N. pironii; N. versoniana

Genus of fungi

Nectriella is a genus of fungi in the class Sordariomycetes. It consists of 35 species.
