= Copromyces =

Scientific classification
- Kingdom: Fungi
- Division: Ascomycota
- Class: Sordariomycetes
- Order: Sordariales
- Family: Sordariaceae
- Genus: Copromyces; N. Lundq.

Type species
- Copromyces bisporus N. Lundq.

Genus of fungi

Copromyces is a genus of fungi within the Sordariaceae family. This is a monotypic genus, containing the single species Copromyces bisporus.
