= Neurospora sitophila =

Scientific classification
- Kingdom: Fungi
- Division: Ascomycota
- Class: Sordariomycetes
- Order: Sordariales
- Family: Sordariaceae
- Genus: Neurospora
- Species: N. sitophila

Binomial name
- Neurospora sitophila Shear & B.O.Dodge

Synonyms
- Amblyosporium aurantiacum (Lév. ex Mont.) Höhn.; Chrysonilia sitophila (Mont.) Arx; Monilia aurantiaca (Lév. ex Mont.) Herter; Monilia lupuli (C.G.Matthews & F.E.Lott) Massee; Monilia sitophila (Mont.) Sacc.; Oidium aurantiacum Lév.; Oidium aurantiacum Lév. ex Mont.; Oidium lupuli C.G.Matthews & F.E.Lott; Oospora aurantiaca (Lév. ex Mont.) Herter; Oospora lupuli (C.G.Matthews & F.E.Lott) Lindau; Penicillium sitophilum Mont.

Species of fungus

Neurospora sitophila is a species of fungus also known as red bread fungus or orange bread fungus. It is a mold that spoils various foods and is responsible for occupational asthma in the wood and cork industry.

== Classification ==
Chrysonilia sitophila is the anamorphic counterpart of Neurospora sitophila (teleomorph). Its position in the classification is:

Sordariaceae, Sordariales, Sordariomycetidae, Sordariomycetes, Ascomycota, Fungi.

== History ==
At the time of its discovery, in 1843, this fungus was named "Penicillium sitophilum" by Montagne and "Oïdium aurantiacum" by Léveillé, but it is now considered not to belong to either genus Oidium nor Penicillium.

In 1848, Anselme Payen reported that it resisted temperatures above 100 degrees, a fact which played a role in discussions of spontaneous generation.

In 2010, Chrysonilia sitophila, the asexual state of neurospora sitophilia, was found to be linked to a case of occupational asthma in a worker exposed to ground coffee.

== Bibliography ==
- Montagne, C. "Quatrième centurie de plantes cellulaires exotiques nouvelles." Annales des Sciences Naturelles, Botanique, 2e sér., vol. 20, 1843, pp. 352–379.
- Payen, A. (rapporteur) "Extrait d'un rapport adressé à M. Le Maréchal Duc de Dalmatie, Ministre de la Guerre, Président du Conseil, sur une altération extraordinaire du pain de munition", Annales de Chimie et de Physique, 3e sér., t. 9, 1843, pp. 5–21.
- Payen, A. "Températures que peuvent supporter les sporules de l'Oïdium aurantiacum sans perdre leur faculté végétative", Comptes rendus de l'Académie des Sciences, 27, 1848, pp. 4–5.
- Payen, A., in Milne Edwards, "Remarques sur la valeur des faits qui sont considérés par quelques naturalistes comme étant propres à prouver l'existence de la génération spontanée des animaux", Payen's intervention, Comptes rendus de l'Académie des Sciences, session of January 3, 1859, vol. 48, 1859, pp. 23–36, online.
- Pasteur, L. 1862. " L'influence de la température sur la fécondité des spores de Mucédinées. ", Comptes rendus de l'Académie des sciences, t. 52, 1861, p. 16-19.
- Gauthier de Claubry, « Sur quelques points de l'histoire de l'oïdium aurantiacum », dans Comptes rendus de l'Académie des Sciences, t. 73 (1871), pp. 725–726, online.
- D.D. Perkins, " The first published scientific study of Neurospora, including a description of photoinduction of carotenoids ", Fungal Genetics Stock Center
- Tarlo S. M.; Wai Y.; Dolovich J.; Summerbell R., " Occupational asthma induced by Chrysonilia sitophila in the logging industry ", Journal of allergy and clinical immunology, 1996, vol. 97, n° 6, pp. 1409–1413.
