= Effetia =

Scientific classification
- Kingdom: Fungi
- Division: Ascomycota
- Class: Sordariomycetes
- Order: Sordariales
- Family: Sordariaceae
- Genus: Effetia; Bartoli, Maggi & Persiani

Type species
- Effetia craspedoconidica Bartoli, Maggi & Persiani

Genus of fungi

Effetia is a genus of fungi within the Sordariaceae family. This is a monotypic genus, containing the single species Effetia craspedoconidica, found on woodland soil in the Ivory Coast.
