= Pseudoneurospora =

Scientific classification
- Kingdom: Fungi
- Division: Ascomycota
- Class: Sordariomycetes
- Order: Sordariales
- Family: Sordariaceae
- Genus: Pseudoneurospora; D. García, Stchigel & Guarro

Type species
- Pseudoneurospora amorphoporcata (Udagawa) Dania García, Stchigel & Guarro

Genus of fungi

Pseudoneurospora is a genus of fungi within the Sordariaceae family. This is a monotypic genus, containing the single species Pseudoneurospora amorphoporcata.
