= Aphelandra rigida =

Scientific classification
- Kingdom: Plantae
- Clade: Tracheophytes
- Clade: Angiosperms
- Clade: Eudicots
- Clade: Asterids
- Order: Lamiales
- Family: Acanthaceae
- Genus: Aphelandra
- Species: A. rigida

Binomial name
- Aphelandra rigida Glaz. & Mildbr.

Species of flowering plant

Aphelandra rigida is a plant species in the family Acanthaceae, which is native to Atlantic Forest vegetation of Brazil.
