= Gelasinospora =

Scientific classification
- Kingdom: Fungi
- Division: Ascomycota
- Class: Sordariomycetes
- Order: Sordariales
- Family: Sordariaceae
- Genus: Gelasinospora

Genus of fungi

Gelasinospora is a genus of fungi within the order Sordariales.

== Reproduction ==
- Gelasinospora as a genus is made up of perithecial fungi, meaning that they discharge their ascospores through an ostiole.
- Spores do not germinate easily, needing a treatment of temperature, chemicals or a combination of the two to initiate germination.
- Like most ascomycetes, Gelasinospora species typically have 8 spores in each ascus.
