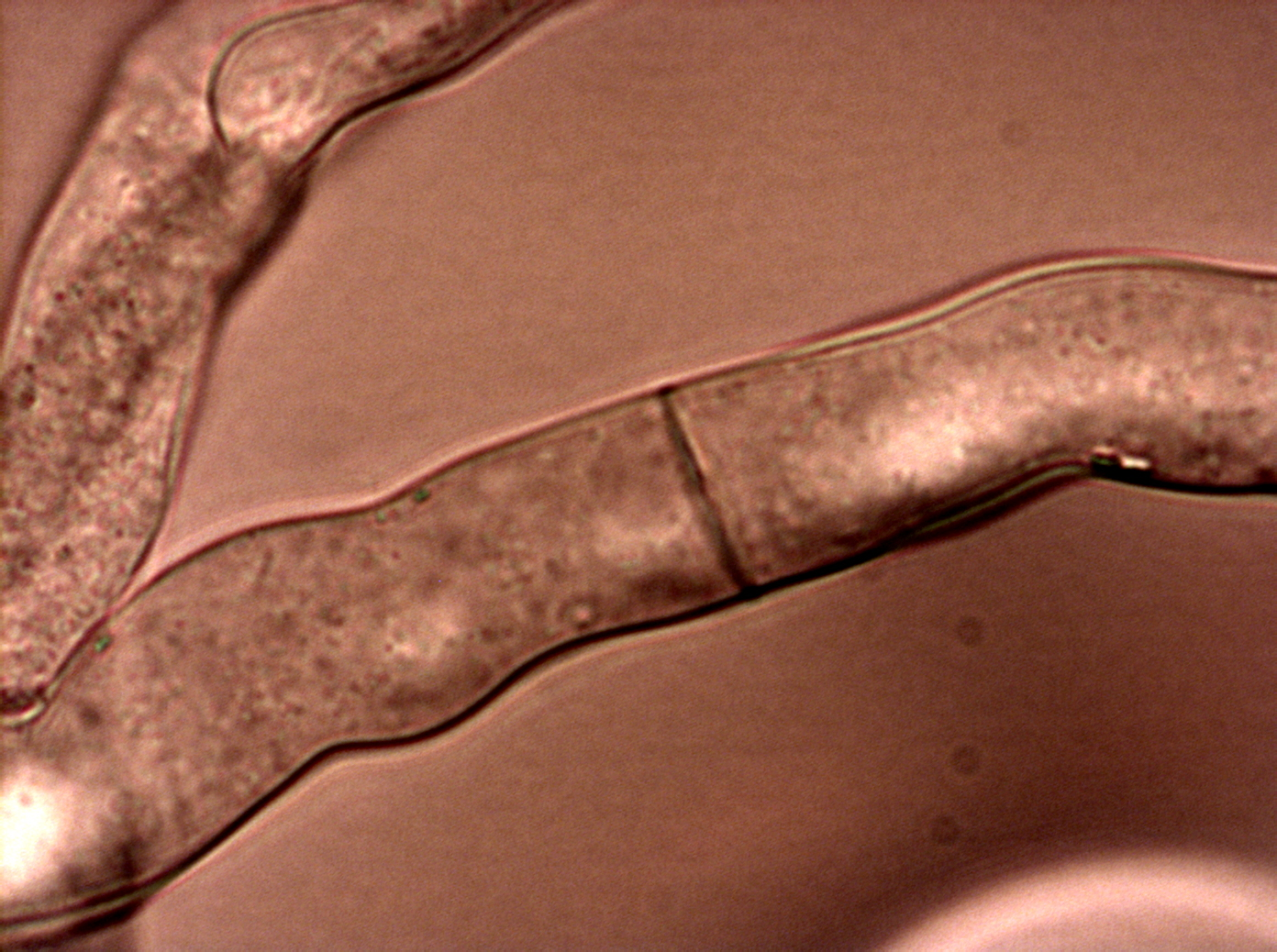
- Neurospora crassa

Scientific classification
- Kingdom: Fungi
- Division: Ascomycota
- Class: Sordariomycetes
- Order: Sordariales
- Family: Sordariaceae
- Genus: Neurospora; Shear & B.O.Dodge (1927)

Type species
- Neurospora sitophila Shear & B.O.Dodge (1927)

Synonyms
- Gelasinospora Dowding (1933); Anixiella Saito & Minoura (1948); Anixiella Saito & Minoura ex Cain (1961); Chrysonilia Arx (1981)

= Neurospora =

Genus of fungi

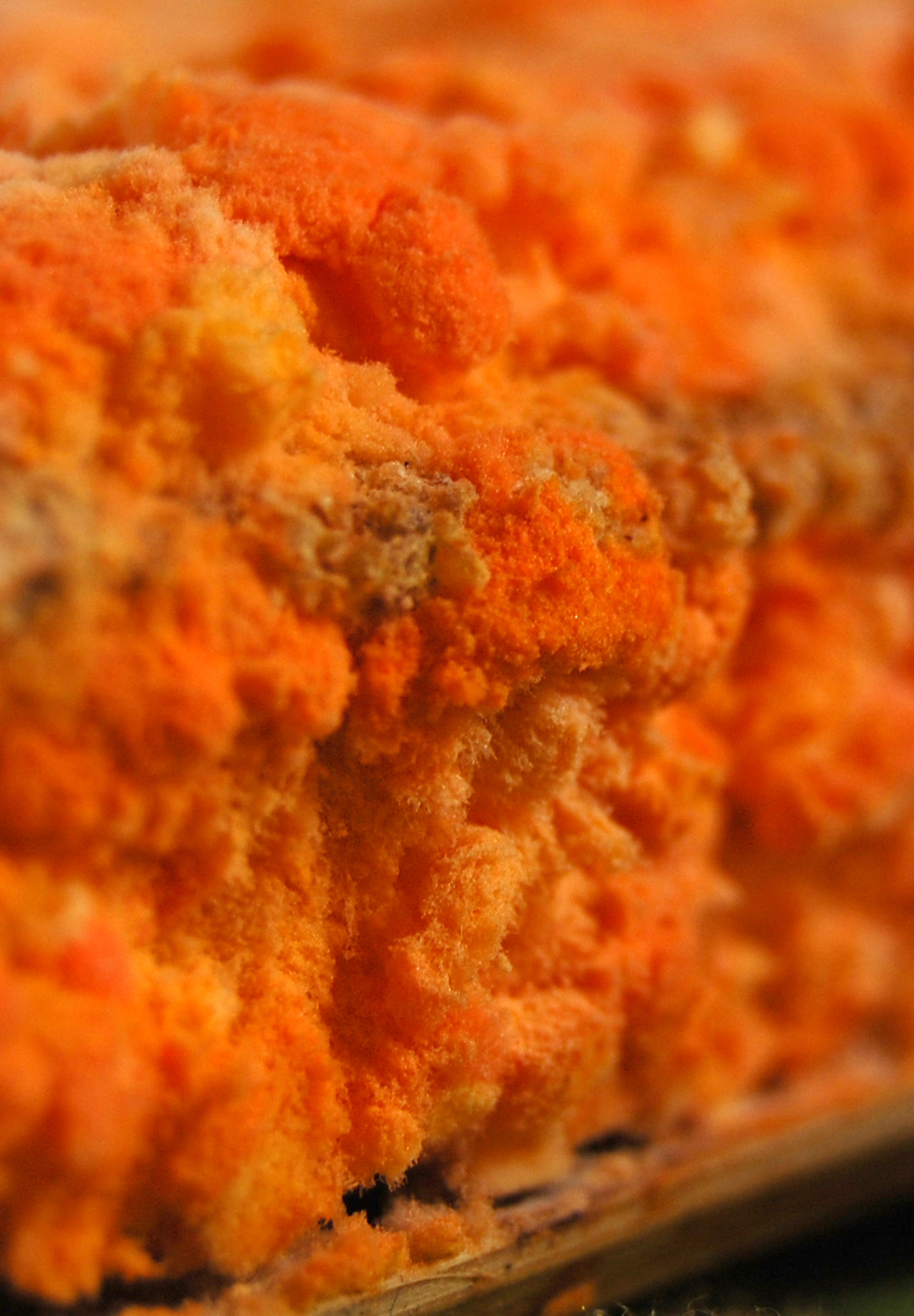
Oncom, made using Neurospora intermedia var. oncomensis

Neurospora is a genus of Ascomycete fungi. The genus name, meaning "nerve spore" refers to the characteristic striations on the spores that resemble axons.

The best known species in this genus is Neurospora crassa, a common model organism in biology. Neurospora intermedia var. oncomensis is believed to be the only mold belonging to Neurospora which is used in food production (to make oncom).

== Characteristics ==
Neurospora species are molds with broadly spreading colonies, with abundant production of ascomata. Ascomata are superficial or immersed, perithecial and ostiolate or cleistothecial and non-ostiolate, hairy or glabrous, dark coloured. Peridium membranaceous, asci cylindrical, clavate or subspherical, with a persistent or evanescent wall, usually with a thickened and non-amyloid annular structure at the apex, usually 8-spored. Ascospores broadly fusiform, ellipsoidal, or nearly spherical, unicellular, hyaline to yellowish brown or olive-brown, becoming dark and opaque at maturity, ascospore wall with longitudinal ribs or pitted, occasionally nearly smooth, 1–2 (but rarely up to 12) germ pores disposed at the ends of the ascospores, gelatinous sheaths or appendages are absent. Anamorphs are known in only a relatively small number of species, which belong to the fungi imperfecti genus Chrysonilia. The type species of the genus is Neurospora sitophila Shear.

== Systematics ==
The former genus Gelasinospora is closely related and not resolved as a distinct monophyletic group, thus the former genus is nowadays included as a synonym of Neurospora.

== Species ==
- Neurospora africana L.H.Huang & Backus (1969)
- Neurospora autosteira (Alexop. & S.H.Sung) S.K.Huang & K.D.Hyde (2021)
- Neurospora bonaerensis (Stchigel & Guarro) Dania García, Stchigel & Guarro (2004)
- Neurospora brevispora (R.S.Khan & J.C. Krug) Dania García, Stchigel & Guarro (2004)
- Neurospora caffra (Matsush.) Dania García, Stchigel & Guarro (2004)
- Neurospora calospora (Mouton) Dania García, Stchigel & Guarro (2004)
- Neurospora cerealis (Dowding) Dania García, Stchigel & Guarro (2004)
- Neurospora crassa Shear & B.O.Dodge (1927)
- Neurospora cratophora (R.S.Khan & J.C.Krug) Dania García, Stchigel & Guarro (2004)
- Neurospora dictyophora (R.S.Khan & J.C.Krug) Dania García, Stchigel & Guarro (2004)
- Neurospora discreta D.D.Perkins & N.B.Raju (1986)
- Neurospora dodgei P.E.Nelson & R.O.Novak (1964)
- Neurospora endodonta (Malloch & Cain) Dania García, Stchigel & Guarro (2004)
- Neurospora erythraea (Möller) Shear & B.O.Dodge (1927)
- Neurospora fallaciosa (Cailleux) Dania García, Stchigel & Guarro (2004)
- Neurospora foveaconica (Cailleux) Dania García, Stchigel & Guarro (2004)
- Neurospora galapagosensis Mahoney & Backus (1969)
- Neurospora goundaensis (Cailleux) Dania García, Stchigel & Guarro (2004)
- Neurospora hapsidophora (R.S.Khan & J.C.Krug) Dania García, Stchigel & Guarro (2004)
- Neurospora heterospora (Cailleux) Dania García, Stchigel & Guarro (2004)
- Neurospora himalayensis (Y.Horie & Udagawa) Dania García, Stchigel & Guarro (2004)
- Neurospora hippopotama (J.C.Krug, R.S.Khan & Jeng) Dania García, Stchigel & Guarro (2004)
- Neurospora hispaniola Villalta, D.J.Jacobson & J.W.Taylor (2009)
- Neurospora indica (J.N.Rai, Wadhwani & J.P.Tewari) Dania García, Stchigel & Guarro (2004)
- Neurospora intermedia F.L.Tai (1935)
- Neurospora inversa (Cailleux) Dania García, Stchigel & Guarro (2004)
- Neurospora kobi (Cailleux) Dania García, Stchigel & Guarro (2004)
- Neurospora lineolata Frederick & Uecker (1970)
- Neurospora longispora (Udagawa) Dania García, Stchigel & Guarro (2004)
- Neurospora macrospora (Cailleux) Dania García, Stchigel & Guarro (2004)
- Neurospora metzenbergii Villalta, D.J.Jacobson & J.W.Taylor (2009)
- Neurospora micropertusa (Y.Horie & Udagawa) Dania García, Stchigel & Guarro (2004)
- Neurospora mirabilis (Furuya & Udagawa) Dania García, Stchigel & Guarro (2004)
- Neurospora multiforis (Cailleux) Dania García, Stchigel & Guarro (2004)
- Neurospora nigeriensis Stchigel & Guarro (2004)
- Neurospora novoguineensis (Takada) Dania García, Stchigel & Guarro (2004)
- Neurospora pannonica J.C.Krug & R.S.Khan (1992)
- Neurospora perkinsii Villalta, D.J.Jacobson & J.W. Taylor (2009)
- Neurospora pseudocalospora (Udagawa) Dania García, Stchigel & Guarro (2004)
- Neurospora pseudoreticulata (Matsush.) Dania García, Stchigel & Guarro (2004)
- Neurospora reticulata (C.Booth & Ebben) Dania García, Stchigel & Guarro (2004)
- Neurospora retispora (Cain) Dania García, Stchigel & Guarro (2004)
- Neurospora saitoi (Udagawa) Dania García, Stchigel & Guarro (2004)
- Neurospora santi-florii (Cailleux) Dania García, Stchigel & Guarro (2004)
- Neurospora seminuda (Cailleux) Dania García, Stchigel & Guarro (2004)
- Neurospora sitophila Shear & B.O.Dodge (1927)
- Neurospora sphaerospora (Y.Horie & Udagawa) Dania García, Stchigel & Guarro (2004)
- Neurospora stellata (Cailleux) Dania García, Stchigel & Guarro (2004)
- Neurospora sublineolata (Furuya & Udagawa) Arx (1982)
- Neurospora terricola Goch. & Backus (1963)
- Neurospora tetrasperma Shear & B.O.Dodge (1927)
- Neurospora tetraspora Dania García, Stchigel & Guarro (2004)
- Neurospora toroi F.L.Tai (1935)
- Neurospora udagawae (R.S.Khan & J.C.Krug) Dania García, Stchigel & Guarro (2004)
- Neurospora uniporata Stchigel, Dania García & Guarro (2004)
- Neurospora varians (Furuya & Udagawa) Dania García, Stchigel & Guarro (2004)
- Neurospora xylopiae C.Ram (1968)

== As model organisms ==
Neurospora is widely used in genetics as a model organism (especially N. crassa) because it quickly reproduces, is easy to culture, and can survive on minimal media (inorganic salts, glucose, water and biotin in agar).

The first studies of sexual reproduction in Neurospora were made by B. O. Dodge. Neurospora was later used by George Wells Beadle and Edward Lawrie Tatum in X-ray mutation experiments to discover mutants that would differ in nutritional requirements. The results of their experiments led them to the one gene-one enzyme hypothesis, in which they postulated that every enzyme was encoded with its own gene.

Research with Neurospora is reported semi-annually at the Neurospora Meeting at Asilomar, California, coordinated by the Fungal Genetics Stock Center. Mutant and wild-type strains of Neurospora are available from the FGSC. The FGSC also publishes the Fungal Genetics Reports.

Important people in Neurospora research:

- Bernard Ogilvie Dodge (1872–1960)
- George Beadle (Nobel Prize in Physiology or Medicine, 1958)
- Edward Tatum (Nobel Prize in Physiology or Medicine, 1958)
- Esther Lederberg
- Norman Giles
- David Perkins
- Robert Metzenberg
- Norman Horowitz
- Herschel K. Mitchell
- Mary B. Mitchell
- Martha Merrow

== Sexual reproduction ==
In the heterothallic species Neurospora crassa, the interaction of haploid strains of opposite mating type is necessary for the occurrence of sexual reproduction and the production of ascospores by meiosis. Ascospores then restore haploid individuals of either mating type. The life cycle phase is thus predominantly haploid, however, upon mating, the nuclei do not immediately fuse: karyogamy is delayed until the very onset of meiosis. The resulting mycelium is called a heterokaryon and is neither diploid nor haploid. The genus Neurospora also includes homothallic species in which a single haploid individual carries both mating type loci and can undergo self-fertilization leading to meiosis and sexual reproduction. Neurospora africana is an example of such a species. Additionally, some "Neurospora" species are said pseudohomothallic. They carry both mating types, but in separate nuclei in the same individual. Two haploid nuclei originating from the same meiosis are packaged into one ascospore. The individual is thus permanently heterokaryotic. Examples of this mating system include "Neurospora tetrasperma" and "Neurospora tetraspora". Because heterothallic species necessarily undergo some degree of outcrossing they may benefit from a higher efficiency of selection because of higher effective recombination rates. In contrast, pseudohomothallic and homothallic species do not outcross (or rarely) and do not experience these benefits: in homothallics a reduced efficiency of negative selection has been shown. However, both hetero- and pseudohomothallic species benefit from the masking of deleterious recessive alleles in the heterokaryotic phase. In addition, all species derive the benefits of meiosis that include the removal of stress-induced DNA damages by homologous recombinational repair, and the formation of stress-resistant ascospores.
