= Bernard Ogilvie Dodge =

American botanist

- Born: 18 April 1872; Mauston, Wisconsin
- Died: 9 August 1960 (aged 88)
- Education: University of Wisconsin, Columbia University
- Scientific career
- Fields: Mycology

Bernard Ogilvie Dodge (18 April 1872 – 9 August 1960) was an American botanist and pioneer researcher on heredity in fungi. Dodge was the author of over 150 papers dealing with the life histories, cytology, morphology, pathology and genetics of fungi, and with insects and other animal pests of plants. He made the first studies of sexual reproduction in the common bread mold, Neurospora.

Dodge's work on the genetics of Neurospora laid the groundwork for the discoveries that earned George Wells Beadle and Edward Lawrie Tatum the Nobel Prize in 1958.

== Early years ==
Bernard Ogilvie Dodge was an eighth-generation descendant of Rebecca Nurse, the third of seven children born to Mary Ann and Elbridge Gerry Dodge. Though neither parent had a high school education, both had a strong love for literature, music and learning. Dodge's father was widely acquainted with the writings of Shakespeare, Byron, Chaucer, Spenser, and Pope, and supplemented the income from his Mauston, Wisconsin farm by teaching in the local schools.

Bernard Dodge spent the first 20 years of his life working on the family farm. He recalled to biographer W. J. Robbins that at the age of 10 a bumper crop of sorghum required operation of the mill day and night during the rush period of syrup making. At such times Dodge's father, two of Dodge's older brothers, and Dodge worked 18 hours a day, beginning at midnight. (Dodge's job was to stand on the circling horsepower platform and drive the horses, walking sideways to avoid dizziness.) That same winter, Bernard Dodge also worked at the local schoolhouse, one mile away, to sweep out the schoolhouse and build the fire. He earned five cents each school day.

Dodge did not complete his high school education until he was 20 years old. He taught high school and then entered the University of Wisconsin as a special student in 1896, only to leave college less than a year later when his funds were exhausted. He returned to teaching until, at the age of 28, he had saved enough money to resume his formal education. He obtained a diploma from Milwaukee Normal School, returned to teaching a third time (serving as high school principal at Algoma, Wisconsin, where he also taught botany, physics and geometry). Dodge returned to the University of Wisconsin in 1908, at the age of 36, and completed the requirements for the Ph.B. degree in 1909.

In high school, Dodge had a three-month course in botany in which each student was required to collect and identify 75 plants, using the keys of Gray's "School and Field Botany" textbook. Dodge recounted to W. J. Robbins that he "far exceeded the number required". While still a high school principal in Algoma, a chance meeting with an amateur mycologist (a Bohemian tailor with a basket full of "Pilze" (mushrooms) that were "gut fur essen" (good to eat)) aroused an interest in collecting fungi. Dodge sent specimens to the University of Wisconsin for identification, bought Atkinson's book on mushrooms, and his wife Jennie presented him with MacIllwain's "One Thousand Edible Mushrooms" as a Christmas present.

At the University of Wisconsin, Dodge studied Botany under R. A. Harper. When Harper transferred to Columbia University in New York, he suggested that Dodge undertake graduate work there. Dodge accepted a minor position as an Assistant and Research Fellow in Botany at Columbia. Dodge received his Ph.D at the age of 40; his first paper was published when he was 42.

Dodge remained at Columbia as Instructor of Botany until 1920, when he accepted an appointment as Plant Pathologist (in fruit diseases) in the Bureau of Plant Industry of the U.S. Department of Agriculture. During his eight years in Washington, D.C., he initiated his studies of Neurospora.

== Neurospora research ==
As a graduate student and instructor at Columbia, Dodge investigated the taxonomy and reproduction of species of Ascobolaceae. He found that the ascospores of several species of Ascobolus which rarely germinate under ordinary conditions on artificial media, do so readily after being subjected to 50-70 degrees Celsius for five to 10 minutes. Dodge discovered this completely by accident: after trying several methods to germinate the ascospores of Ascobolus (without success). One day Dodge temporarily set down a batch of test plates inside a hot-air sterilizer which was not running, while he went to teach a class. When Dodge returned, he was dismayed to find that someone had lit the oven in the interim, and the temperature inside had reached over 70 degrees. Dodge removed the plates, assumed that the spores had been killed, but before discarding the old plates he examined them under a microscope. He was astounded to find that most of the spores had germinated. This discovery proved to be of importance later for his studies of Neurospora.

Though Dodge considered himself primarily a mycologist and a plant pathologist, his study of Neurospora is regarded by many as his major work. As he told W. J. Robbins:

I was, 1925-6, highly interested in studies on the blackberry rusts, short and long cycle forms (species). […] I had found that I could pass the rust on the Black Diamond blackberry (dewberry) by grafting to young shoots of this species, and was trying to culture the rest on cornmeal agar in plates and flasks. So I had several plates and flasks (250 cc) standing on shelves in the Arlington Farm greenhouses. I was much concerned to find that Monila sitophila had gotten into some of the flasks as well as some plates. Practically all of them were soon bearing perithecia resembling those Dr. C. L. Shear had shown me and [had] asked me to try to germinate the ascospores. I was so much excited and interested in my rust studies that I could not leave those experiments to help my superior out. I did suggest trying to make those spores germinate by heating them. […] Several weeks had passed when this red bread mold developed in my greenhouse flasks and plates. Just on a chance I inverted plates of corn [meal] agar on cultures of perithecia shooting spores so spores were shot upward and scattered about. I put some of these plates in a drying oven and heated them as I had gone many times to make ascospores of Ascobolus to germinate. By next morning a high percentage of the mold had germinated.

The ability to germinate the ascospores of Neurospora made it possible to define its life cycle, distinguish species, make crosses between species, and grow the haploid offspring.

Over the next 30 years, Dodge published over 40 papers on Neurospora, which was easy to grow and required little space (and only a few days) to complete its life cycle. These advantages made Neurospora, in many respects, an ideal organism for the investigation of genetics and biochemical genetics. Dodge convinced Thomas Hunt Morgan of the advantages of Neurospora and Morgan took cultures with him when he transferred from Columbia University to the California Institute of Technology in 1928.

== Influence ==
Dodge never developed a larger program involving an extensive study of spontaneous and induced mutations or chromosome mapping. In fact, he regarded his research on Neurospora as an "extra", carried on while pursuing his official duties as a plant pathologist. Nevertheless, Dodge's investigations laid the foundation for the use of Neurospora in the investigation of genetics and biochemical genetics on a worldwide basis. In a letter to Dodge on November 1, 1959, George Beadle wrote:

Without your pioneer work, those of us who have made use of Neurospora never could have done what we did. [..] Neurospora has been good to many of us and it is your baby more than anyone else's. Thanks again for giving it to genetics.

In his own Nobel Lecture, Edward L. Tatum wrote:

I shall not enumerate the factors involved in our selection of this organism for the production of chemical or nutritionally deficient mutants, but must take this opportunity of reiterating our indebtedness to the previous basic finds of a number of investigators. Foremost among these, to B. O. Dodge for this establishment of this ascomycete as a most suitable organism for genetics studies; and to C. C. Lindegren, who became interested in Neurospora through T. H. Morgan, a close friend of Dodge.

Another prominent scientist inspired directly by Dodge was Esther Lederberg, who worked with him at the New York Botanical Garden as an intern while she was an undergraduate at Hunter College, Lederberg (née Esther Miriam Zimmer) worked with Dodge under three scholarships between 1941 and 1942, conducting research in heterokaryosis in Neurospora tetrasperma. She wrote her Master's thesis on Neurospora crassa and published two papers on Neurospora crassa before beginning her studies of the bacterium Escherichia coli, and her highly influential development of replica plating, the discovery of fertility factor F (inheritable sex change due to viral infection), temperate lambda bacteriophage, and her pioneering work in transduction.

== Professional associations ==
- National Academy of Sciences
- Sigma Xi
- American Association for the Advancement of Science
- Linnean Society of London
- British Mycological Society (honorary)
- Torrey Botanical Club
- Botanical Society of America
