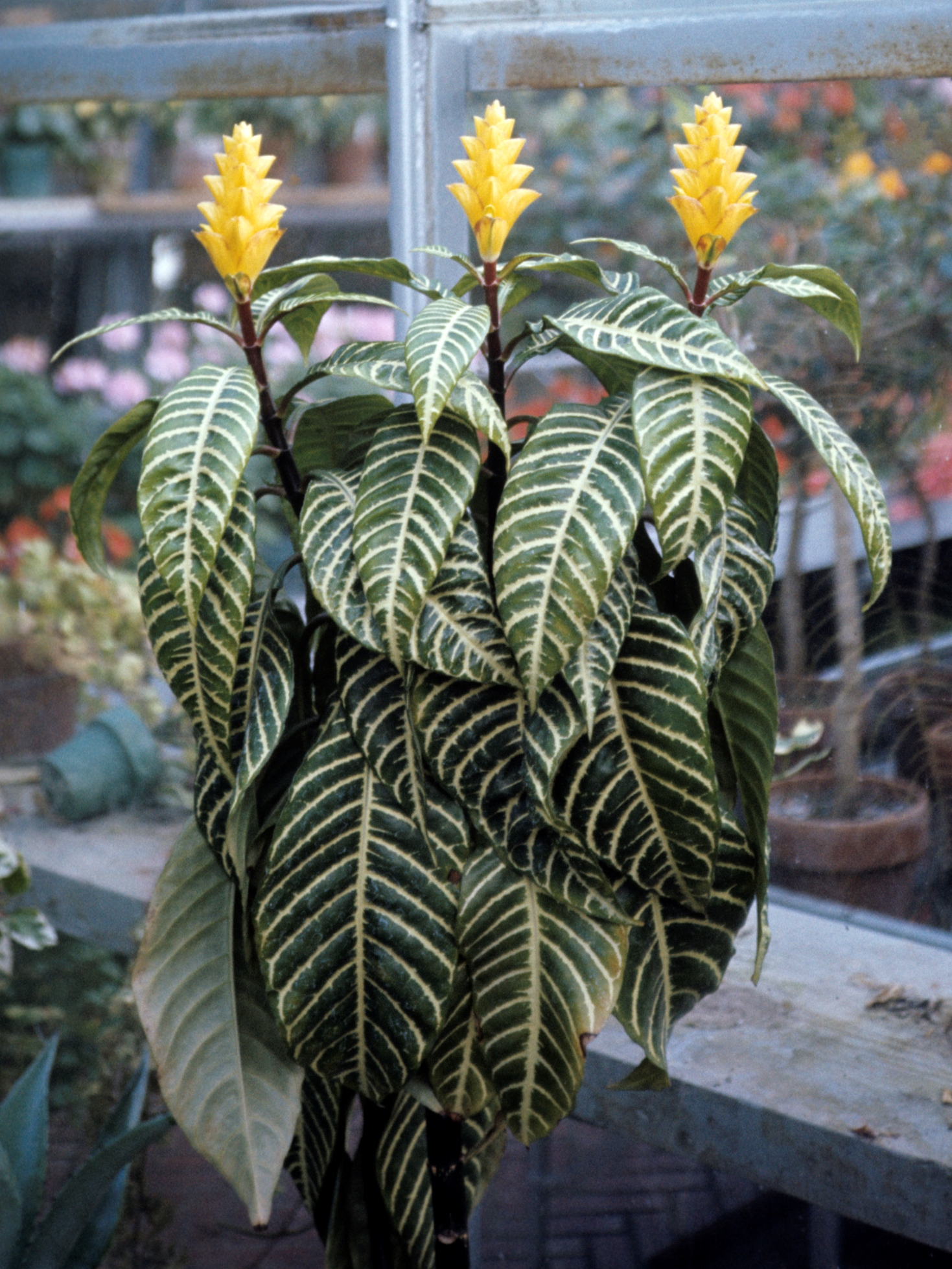

Scientific classification
- Kingdom: Plantae
- Clade: Embryophytes
- Clade: Tracheophytes
- Clade: Spermatophytes
- Clade: Angiosperms
- Clade: Eudicots
- Clade: Asterids
- Order: Lamiales
- Family: Acanthaceae
- Genus: Aphelandra
- Species: A. squarrosa

Binomial name
- Aphelandra squarrosa Nees

= Aphelandra squarrosa =

Species of flowering plant

Aphelandra squarrosa (commonly but ambiguously called "zebra plant") is a plant species in the family Acanthaceae, which is native to Atlantic Forest vegetation of Brazil. This plant is often used as a house plant. This plant is cited in Flora Brasiliensis by Carl Friedrich Philipp von Martius.

== Plant care ==
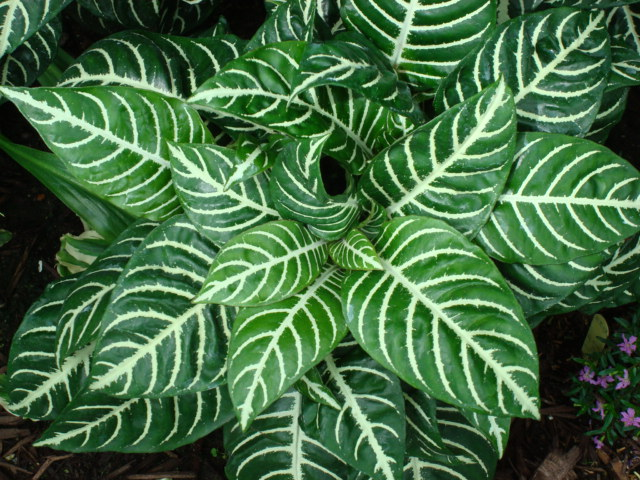

This plant flourishes in abundant, but not direct, light. It does not bloom often, but it can be encouraged to bloom by prolonged daily exposure to light. It is also very sensitive to moisture content; too much or too little water will cause the lower leaves to brown and fall off. It likes to be kept moist, but not wet. On average, it needs frequent, small amounts of water, as opposed to an occasional, thorough watering. The zebra plant can grow slowly, it grows 2 feet (60 cm) over a few years.

The plant flourishes when the temperature is in the range of 18–21 °C (64–70 °F); and will suffer if the temperature drops below 15 °C (59 °F) for prolonged periods. The plant may be weak after flowering and may need a little more care.

Potting soil enriched with peat moss or African violet mix is recommended. Fertilizer should be applied every two weeks from spring through fall and every six weeks in winter. Repotting is usually done annually in the spring to refresh the soil, keeping the plant slightly rootbound.

Propagation is typically achieved through stem tip cuttings taken in spring. Use of rooting hormone can improve success rates. With proper care, the plant can live several years and can be maintained indefinitely through propagation.

== Flowering ==
The plant naturally blooms in the fall. Its yellow bracts often persist for several weeks even though the actual flowers only last a few days. For reblooming, the plant should be exposed to bright light for at least three months. Light intensity, rather than day length, is the main trigger for flowering. After flowering, the plant should be allowed to rest in a cooler room for about two months before moving it back to a bright location in late spring.

== Common problems and pests ==
Aphelandra squarrosa can be sensitive to its growing conditions. Leaf curling or crinkling may indicate too much light, while wilting tips typically point to dry soil. Yellowing lower leaves may result from inconsistent watering or over-fertilization.

It is susceptible to common indoor pests, including whiteflies, fungus gnats, aphids, and mealybugs. Mealybugs appear as white, cottony masses on the stems, while aphids are often found on the undersides of new leaves. Affected plants should be cleaned thoroughly and treated with insecticidal soap or rubbing alcohol.

== Cultivars ==
The most widely grown cultivar is ‘Dania’, known for its deep green leaves with prominent white veins. Another popular selection is ‘Red Apollo’, which features red-tinged stems and leaf undersides with a reddish blush, giving the plant a more dramatic appearance.
