= Peroni (surname) =

Peroni is a surname. Some people that bear the name include:

- Alessandro Peroni (1874–1964), Italian musician and composer
- Claudia Peroni (born 1959), Italian journalist
- Geraldine Peroni (1953–2004), American film editor
- Giuseppe Peroni (1700–1776), Italian painter of the Baroque period
- Renato Peroni (1930–2010), Italian prehistorian
- Riccardo Peroni (born 1949), Italian actor and cabaret performer
