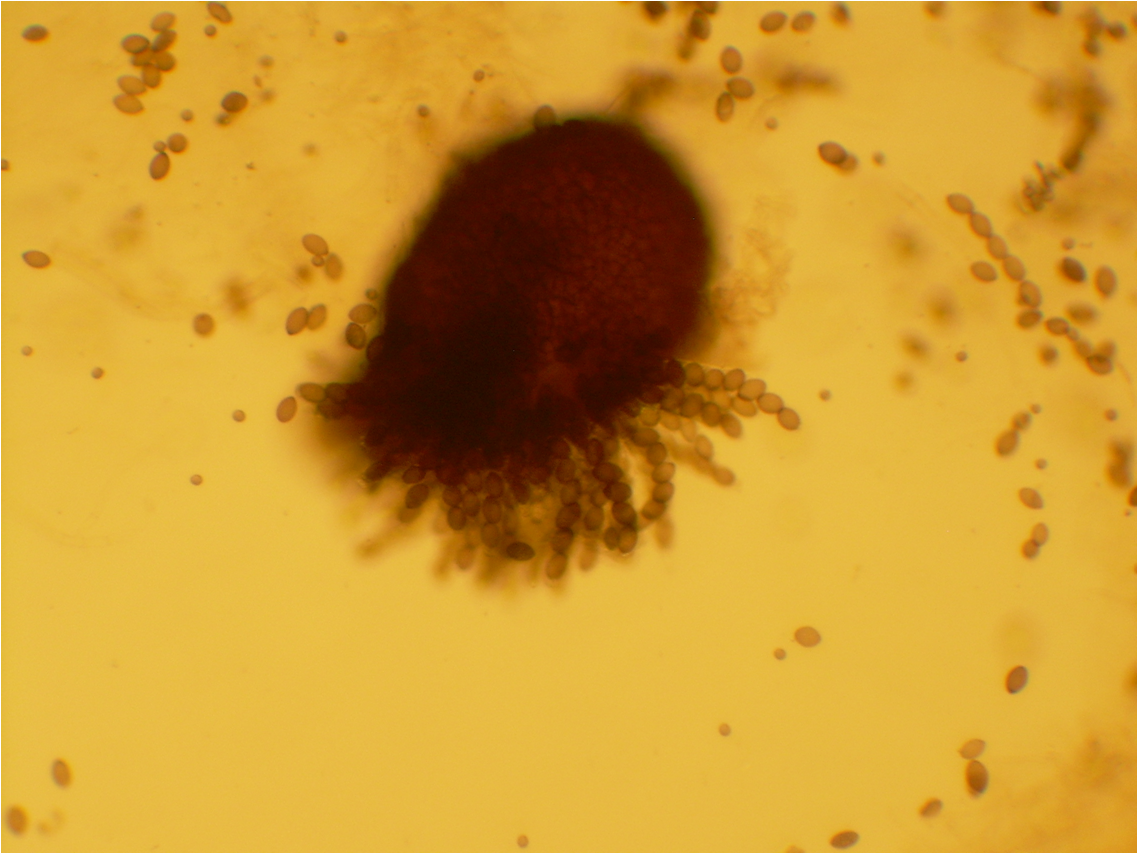
- Sordaria fimicola perithecium

Scientific classification
- Kingdom: Fungi
- Division: Ascomycota
- Class: Sordariomycetes
- Order: Sordariales
- Family: Sordariaceae; G. Winter

Type genus
- Sordaria Ces. & De Not.

Genera
- Cainiella; Copromyces; Effetia – uncertain position Gelasinospora; Guilliermondia – uncertain position Neurospora; Pseudoneurospora; Sordaria; Stellatospora

= Sordariaceae =

Family of fungi

The Sordariaceae are a family of perithecial fungi within the Sordariales order.

The family includes the important model organism Neurospora crassa that is used in genetic research. Members of the family include the red bread molds in the genus Neurospora, including Neurospora sitophila, which is used to produce the fermented food oncom. Other species in the family inhabit herbivore dung or plant parts.

== Characteristics ==
Sordariaceae have dark, usually ostiolate ascomata, and unitunicate, cylindrical asci. Their ascospores are brown to black, often with a gelatinous sheath or with wall ornamentations, but lack gelatinous appendages.

== Systematics ==
The family includes the following genera:

- Cainiella
- Copromyces
- Effetia
- Gelasinospora
- Guilliermondia
- Neurospora
- Pseudoneurospora
- Sordaria
- Stellatospora

The Gelasinospora might be included in Neurospora.
