= Conidiomata =

Fruiting structures of a type of fungus

Conidiomata (singular: Conidioma) are blister-like fruiting structures produced by a specific type of fungus called a coelomycete. They are formed as a means of dispersing asexual spores call conidia, which they accomplish by creating the blister-like formations which then rupture to release the contained spores.

== Structure ==
Conidiomata mainly consist of a mass of densely packed hypha which develops below the surface of the host cuticle, and the fungus may or may not use some of the host’s own tissue to construct the structure. Development of these structures can either occur just below the cuticle or below the epidermal layer of the tissue. Formation on the differing levels is dependent upon the type of conidiomata being formed. Five types of conidioma have been found and are classified as acervuli, pycnidia, sporodochia, synnemata and corenima.

== Types ==
=== Acervuli ===
Acervuli is one of the two major groups of conidiomata (the other being pycnidia). Conidiomata of this type form just below the cuticle of host tissue and produce massive blisters which protrude fairly far into the outside environment. Acervuli also have a large opening at the top from which the conidia are released. Colletotrichum and Pestaloptiopsis are examples of genera which produce these structures.

=== Pycnidia ===
Pycnidia, the other major group of conidiomata, forms beneath the epithelial layer of host tissue. The structure resembles that of ascospores, and a pear-shaped structure produced entirely below the surface. This formations leaves the cuticle with only a minor bulge on the outside surface rather that a massive blister which was seen with Acervuli. Genera which produce this type of structure include Phomopsis, Botryodiplodia, and Phoma

=== Sporodochia and synnemata ===
Sporodochia are small, compact, slightly raised circles which form on host. Deuteromycota and Hyphomycetes produce these types of structures.

Synnemata are large, fused conidiophores which form a strand resembling a stalk of wheat, with spores lining the outside of the structure. Genera which produce synnemata include Doratomyces.
