= Ceratopodium elegans =

Scientific classification
- Kingdom: Fungi
- Division: Ascomycota
- Class: Sordariomycetes
- Order: Microascales
- Family: Microascaceae
- Genus: Ceratopodium
- Species: C. elegans

Binomial name
- Ceratopodium elegans Sorokīn 1871

Species of fungus

Ceratopodium elegans is a species of fungus in the family Microascaceae
