= Graphium samogiticum =

Scientific classification
- Domain: Eukaryota
- Kingdom: Fungi
- Division: Ascomycota
- Class: Sordariomycetes
- Order: Microascales
- Family: Microascaceae
- Genus: Graphium
- Species: G. samogiticum

Binomial name
- Graphium samogiticum Motiej. & Alstrup (2006)

Species of lichen

Graphium samogiticum is a little-known species of lichenicolous (lichen-eating) fungus in the family Microascaceae. It is found in Lithuania, where it parasitises two lichen species that inhabit abandoned gravel pits.

== Taxonomy ==
The fungus was formally described as a new species in 2006 by Jurga Motiejūnaitė and Vagn Alstrup. The type specimen was collected in Žemaitija National Park (Plungė District); there, in an abandoned gravel pit in Žalnierkalnis, the fungus was found growing on the thallus of the crustose lichen Verrucaria bryoctona, which itself was growing on gravelly soil. The species epithet refers to the type locality: samogiticum is formed from the Latin name for Žemaitija (Samogitia).

== Description ==
Graphium samogiticum is an anamorphic fungus, meaning that its sexual cycle has not been observed, or does not exist–only asexual and vegetative phases are known. The conidiophores made by the fungus are grouped together in black synnemata that are 80–120 μm high and 25 μm thick. The thick-walled conidia are a pale grey-brown colour with dimensions of 6.5–8 by 3–4 μm. A morphologically similar species is Graphium aphthosae, which grows on Peltigera lichens.

Known hosts for the fungus are Sarcosagium campestre and Verrucaria bryoctona. Of the twenty six known lichenicolous fungi that have a strict host preference on genus Verrucaria, Graphium samogiticum is the only anamorphic fungus. Little is known about the ecology and distribution of Graphium samogiticum; the lichens it was parasitising are inhabitants of a little-studied habitat the authors call a "pioneer epigeal community". They suggest it may have a more widespread European distribution.
