= Petriella setifera =

Scientific classification
- Kingdom: Fungi
- Division: Ascomycota
- Class: Sordariomycetes
- Order: Microascales
- Family: Microascaceae
- Genus: Petriella
- Species: P. setifera

Binomial name
- Petriella setifera (Alf. Schmidt) Curzi (1930)

Synonyms
- Microascus setifer Alf. Schmidt (1912); Lophotrichus setifer Alf. Schmidt (1978)

Species of fungus

Petriella setifera is a fungus commonly found in soil and feces. The fungus has also been located on wood rot, plant species, and compost. A significant portion of P. setifera reports are found on sources with no previous association with the fungus. There are no known human cases of fungal infection, but one reported case of a dolphin infection. The fungus may have immunosuppressive characteristics, but it has not been confirmed. Many properties of the fungus are unknown, requiring further research.

== History and taxonomy ==
Petriella setifera was first discovered on horse dung by A. Schmidt in Germany 1912. In this discovery, the fungus was categorized as a species of Microascus. It was later determined as a wood fungus by L. Shigo in 1957 when it was collected from a wilted oak tree in West Virginia. Since the discovery, the fungus was found in a variety of environments including wood and soil areas. This fungus was renamed under the genus Petriella in 1930 for reasons currently unknown. Further analysis of the fungus concluded there are multiple stages of development, including Schmidt`s discovery of the fungus in teleomorph phase. In 1961 Barron reported on the Sporotrichum and Graphium anamorph stages of the fungus in isolations from soil. A year later, A.L Shigoon reported the fungus in Tokyo and other regions of the globe including the United States. The fungus continues to be found in other regions, classified under P. setifera.

== Morphology and physiology ==
All species in the genus Petriella have a Graphium state, characterized by dark synnemata and round, single-celled spores in the mucus. Dimorphic pore openings produce condia to form mucoid balls at the synnemata apex, which is similarly found in Lectographium lundbergii. The spores are sexual, non-motile conidiophores. The perithecium in which the sexual spores are borne is pale to dark brown colour, 75-125μm in diameter with scattered hairs along the neck. It is thought that expression of the slime-spored Graphium may be induced by certain environmental conditions.

In the laboratory, asymmetric ascospores were found at room temperature when the fungus was grown on a PDA plate. Clusters of brown-grey chlamydospores have been isolated on the agar. These spores were only found in P. boulangeri previously, but it is believed P. setifera developed chlamydospores to survive in the soil. The asymmetrical ascospore convex and marked germinal pores are unique to P. setifera. The Graphium stage has been associated with fungal reproduction, while the Sporotrichum state has the largest growth and branching. Hyphae are found to form many condia near the apical end during the Sporotrichum stage. CMCase which is also known as cellulase, can be produced by P. setifera optimally at 55 °C and a pH 6.0. The fungus is stable between pH 5.0-8.0 and at temperatures below 45 °C. In-vitro CMCase production has been linked to increased Na^{+}, K^{+}, Ca^{2+}, Mg^{2+}, EDTA and Mn^{2+} levels in the agar and a severe decrease in Fe^{2+}, Pb^{2+}, Al^{3+}, Zn^{2+}, Fe^{3+} and Cu^{2+}.

== Pathology and medical uses ==
A single case of infection has been reported from a bottlenose dolphin. Petriella setifera has no known infectious properties for humans or other species. Petriella strains have rarely been associated with vertebrate infections. However, all species in the genus have not been fully analyzed for pathology.

The fungus is known to have antifungal properties. Ethyl acetate extracts from the fungus show activity against fungal pathogens of plants including Magnaporthe grisea and Fusarium oxysporum. The fungus also showed inhibitory effects on Staphylococcus aureus. In-vitro, species of Petriella can produce immunosuppressive metabolites but none of the members of this group are regularly implicated in human disease.

== Habitat and ecology ==
Petriella setifera was originally found on horse feces in 1912, but has since been linked to decayed wood, compost and maize field soil. It is most commonly found in soil and feces, but also common in wood or plant debris when in Graphium state. The discovery of P. setifera on rock hyrax dung was the first case of the fungus in Kenya. It has not been linked to this species prior. There are multiple reports of P. setifera found in unique environments including a human nail and bathroom jar, but these may be due to cross-contamination. One study found P. setifera in wood litter of chicken houses with a history of fungal infestations. Growth of the fungus was independent of ventilation and amount of light. There may be an association with ammonia, as the fungus was found in chicken fertilized soil but not in mineral fertilized. There was also a case of the fungus found in black pepper and mustard seedling rot. Researchers believe the fungus diverged from the genus Ceratocystis. The habitat P. setifera thrives in is difficult to isolate due to the environments it has been found in.

The fungus has been recorded in multiple regions across continents. Regions of Canada, coastal Asia, Northern and Central Europe have frequent reports of the fungus. Petriella setifera has also been associated with Sessile oak in North-western Poland causing oak decline, and in Ontario cedar swamp soil. Phomopsis and Rosellinia acquila grew with P. setifera when isolated from oak. Nothapodytes nimmoniana and Pinus roxburghii are also possible plant hosts of the fungus, found in the Western Himalayas. Salvia miltiorrhiza has also been associated with the fungus. Petriella setifera has an endophytic relationship with this species, and possibly other plants.

== Use ==
CMCase produced by P. setifera has a potential use in denim stoning with the ability to cause fabric loss and indigo dye removal.
