= Petriella =

Scientific classification
- Kingdom: Fungi
- Division: Ascomycota
- Class: Sordariomycetes
- Order: Microascales
- Family: Microascaceae
- Genus: Petriella; Curzi (1930)

Type species
- Petriella asymmetrica Curzi (1930)

Species
- Petriella asymmetrica; Petriella setifera

Genus of fungi

Petriella is a genus of fungi in the family Microascaceae. Species in the genus are typically found in plant material and dung in nature. Indoors, they are commonly found in wet wood, particularly common under kitchen sinks and bathrooms where there is relatively slowly on persistently wet wood. It produces a Graphium or Scedosporium in the anamorph state. Petriella produces sticky cirrus of reddish brown ascospores at maturity from small black ascocarps. No reports of mycotoxins, pathogenicity, or allergy are known.

The genus name of Petriella is in honour of Lionello Petri (1875-1946), who was an Italian botanist (Mycology) and Phytopathologist, who worked with Oreste Mattirolo in Florence.

The genus was circumscribed by Mario Curzi in Boll. Staz. Patol. Veg. Roma vol.10 on page 384 in 1930.
