= Graphium =

Graphium may refer to:

- Graphium (butterfly), a genus of mostly tropical swallowtail butterflies
- Graphium (fungus), a genus of fungi in the family Microascaceae
