= Conservation and restoration of feathers =

Process of protecting feathers

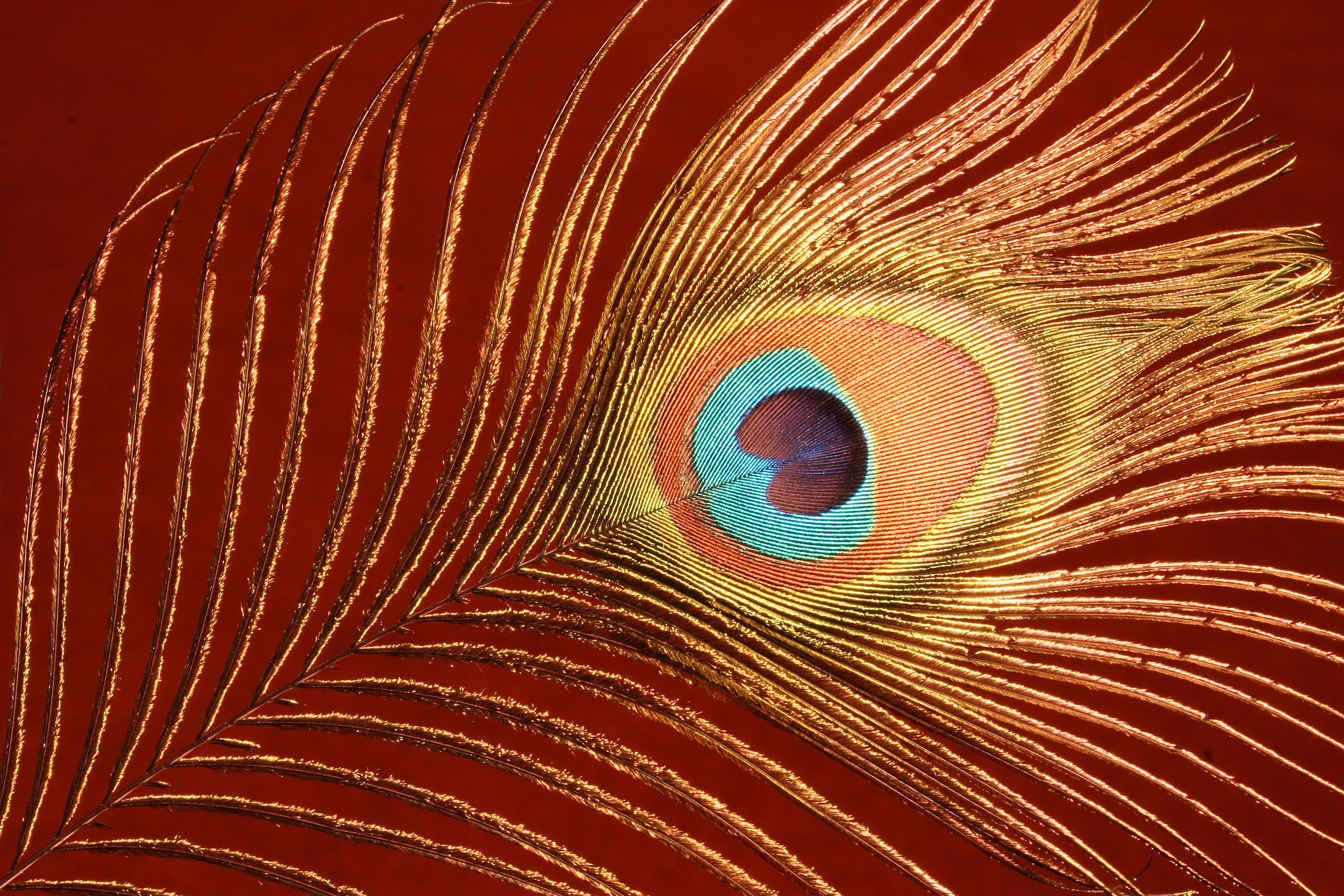
Peacock tail feather

The conservation and restoration of feathers is the practice of maintaining and preserving feathers or featherwork objects, and requires knowledge of feather anatomy, properties, specialized care procedures, and environmental influences. This practice may be approached through preventive and/or interventive techniques.

== Anatomy ==
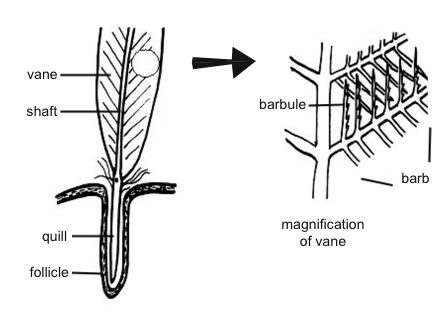
The anatomy of a contour feather

=== Overview ===
- Feathers are made of a protein commonly found in the bodies of many animals known as keratin
- Feathers take on a protective function
- Made up of about 91% protein, 8% water, and 1% lipids
- There are two basic types of feathers: pennaceous (contour) and plumulaceous (down)

=== Structure ===
Although there are many different parts to a feather, all of the parts fall into two subsections of the feather. The two main sections of the feather are the shaft and the vane.

==== Shaft ====
The shaft is composed of the calamus and the rachis. The calamus can also be called the quill and is the hollow portion of the shaft that enters the skin follicle, while the rachis is the solid portion of the shaft where the barbs attach.

==== Vane ====
The vane extends to either side of the rachis and is made up of interconnecting barbs, barbules, and "hooklets" known as hamuli. This is considered the most substantial portion of the feather.

=== Uses ===
Feathers found in museum collections are often part of composite objects, such as hats, fans, jewelry, and spiritual objects. Their use in collection items that may be in need of conservation or restoration include purposes such as:

- Utilitarian
- Cultural
- Artwork
- Natural history and taxidermy

== Deterioration ==
Many of the issues contained in this section can be eliminated or reduced through the proper care instructions listed in the below preventive and interventive sections.

=== Pests in living birds ===
While birds are alive, they are susceptible to several different pests including lice and mites. In particular, "chewing lice" like Mallophaga can infest a living bird, feed on and degrade its feathers. Over 2500 species of mites are linked with birds, including those that live on feather plumage and within quill structures. Despite the seeming threat, some current research suggests that at least some mites may be beneficial to living birds (and their feathers) by consuming bacteria and fungi thereby creating a symbiotic relationship. Special sprays and soaps can kill these pests allowing the birds to regain feather growth and become healthy.

=== Pests in collections ===
==== Insects ====
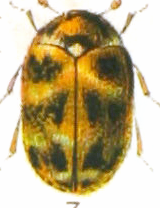
Dermestid beetle, also known as the carpet beetle

Because feathers are made largely of protein (keratin), they are a target for insects. Insects that like to eat protein based material will often feed on feathers causing serious damage including loss of feather material, burrowed or grazed surfaces, and frass. The most common threats come from the carpet beetle, hide beetles, larder beetles and clothing moths.

==== Fungi ====
Other organisms that can contribute to the deterioration of feathers include fungi. The high keratin content of feathers makes them susceptible to keratinophilic, or keratin loving, fungi. Some of these fungi, like Chrysosporium keratinophilum, can eventually completely consume and destroy feathers. Others, like Aspergillus and Penicillium, can cause black and green discoloration.

==== Vertebrate pests ====
There is also a risk presented by other animals, particularly rodents, who may damage items by eating them, using them for nesting, etc. In addition, these animals may bring other insects and mites with them or attract them after dying.

=== Physical forces ===
Physical forces that contribute to deterioration include things like impact, shock, vibration, pressure and abrasion. Feathers are very vulnerable to physical forces due to their fragile structure which can be easily bent and broken, and the structural color of some feathers can be affected by abrasion.

=== Light ===
Light can have a differential effect on the coloration of feathers depending on whether the color is caused by structural characteristics of the feather or by natural pigmentation due to melanin, carotenoids or psittacofulvins with coloration from pigmented feathers being more sensitive to light than those with structural coloration. Feathers that have been artificially dyed by humans are even more highly sensitive to light. In addition, the degree of fading can vary between bird species. Most of the change in feather coloration occurs somewhat quickly upon initial exposure to light, and once this happens, the fading becomes somewhat stabilized. Exposure to UV light can also cause feathers to become brittle

=== Incorrect temperature ===
Lower temperatures are generally preferred. As temperatures get warmer, growth of mold/fungi can increase and the eating and breeding activities of pests can rise. Temperatures that are too warm can also contribute to the expulsion of residual oils from the skins of taxidermy specimens which can in turn cause feather loss. One study was shown to indicate that temperature can also contribute to color change in carotenoids with the most stable temperatures for color being below freezing.

==== Temperature fluctuations ====
In addition to the temperature itself, the expansion and contraction cycles caused by fluctuations in temperature can also contribute to deterioration especially of composite objects that may include feathers as a component. Different materials can expand and contract at different rates causing components to work free of each other over time.

=== Incorrect relative humidity and water ===
Most of the danger from high relative humidity (RH) is related to its effect on the growth of mold/fungi and pest activity which is more likely when RH is higher than 65%. High relative humidity can also increase chemical reactions resulting in things like the fading of artificial dyes. Similar to fluctuations in temperature, fluctuations in relative humidity can also put differential stress on composite objects where feathers are attached to other materials resulting in possible damage. Dew point may also be an important concern as it relates to fluctuations in temperature below the dew point which can cause condensation to occur on surfaces. Common sources of humidity include external air and weather, human respiration, broken pipes, mopping and flooded areas.

==== Water ====
Feathers can be naturally water repellant to some degree unless damaged. However, artificially dyed feathers can bleed or be stained if they come into contact with water.

=== Pollutants ===
Feathers have a large surface area created by their structure which can easily capture particulates and "oily residues".

==== Gaseous pollutants ====
Outdoor pollutants that can cause deterioration most commonly include sulphur dioxide, hydrogen sulfide, nitrogen oxide, nitrogen dioxide, and ozone which can react with objects or combine with other substances to produce sulphuric acid or nitric acid which in turn can cause damage to objects. Gaseous pollutants can also come from indoor sources often in the form of organic acids, peroxides, formaldehydes and ozone, and can be generated by building materials, plastics, glues, paints, cleaning chemicals or office equipment.

==== Particulate pollutants ====
Particulate pollutants include substances such as dust, soot, smoke, pollen, and soil which can be abrasive to feathers, attract pests and chemically react with moisture. Allowing particulates to accumulate on feathers also creates the need for cleaning which can put fragile feathers at risk for physical damage. In addition, particulates can cause the relative humidity around the feather to rise. This rise in humidity and the resulting addition of moisture can accelerate the deterioration of the feather.

=== Theft ===
Humans use feathers in many different ways. Certain species of bird feathers are highly sought after or are rare or valuable. Because of this, some feathers are at risk for theft. One recent example was an incident in the UK in 2009 when 299 bird specimens, some originally collected by Alfred Russel Wallace, were stolen from the Natural History Museum at Tring with the intent to sell the feathers for fly tying.

== Preventive conservation ==
Preventive conservation seeks to preemptively assess how collection objects may be affected by agents of deterioration, and how to best combat or slow down their influence. Accurate record keeping is an important tool for preventive conservation. Having detailed records to consult and being able to repeat the same method of testing where applicable will most accurately depict any changes happening to the object.

=== Proper display and storage conditions ===
The proper care and handling of feathers is essential for the survival of the object.

==== Storage materials ====
Alkaline storage or display construction materials are not favorable to feathers, as they will cause the chemical deterioration of items made from animal products. Better suited for feather storage and display are acid-free, pH-neutral, or un-buffered materials, such as boxes or tissues.

==== Climate control (temperature and relative humidity) ====
The complex structures of organic materials in general make them vulnerable to deterioration from extremes and variations in RH and temperature. The temperature and RH can be monitored with a climate control system or managed on a smaller scale using silica gel packets in storage or display areas. Cotton and acid-free tissue are humidity-buffering materials that may be used in storage solutions.

==== Pest control ====
The organic makeup of feathers make them a food source for mold, insects, rodents and other museum pests. Implementing an Integrated Pest Management Program can help identify any current or potential pest issues. If active pests are suspected, featherwork can be stored within two layers of well-sealed polyethylene bags, labeled with the date.

==== Light exposure ====
Exposure to light can cause "color shift and/or embrittlement in organic materials". As structural color relies on the physical structure of the feather, and not pigmentation, these feathers are less likely to be adversely affected by light exposure in regards to their coloring. Feathers colored by pigmentation are most susceptible to fading or discoloration while on display, and so require more stringent lighting provisions. UV filtration in storage and display areas is one way to manage light exposure.

==== Protection from physical forces ====
Feathers come in all shapes and sizes, and can be very delicate. This makes them susceptible to crushing or distortion if improperly stored with and/or near a heavier object.

==== Protection from pollutants ====
As feathers are made of fibrous materials, they can easily absorb airborne pollutants. The structure of feathers, with their tiny barbed branches, make dust an issue for feathers. Dust covers can be used to prevent dust from building up on the object while in storage or on display.

==== Fire safety ====
Feathers are flammable, especially if dry and/or brittle. For fire safety and prevention, eliminating the threat of fire hazards is often the preferred method of control.

=== Proper handling ===
==== Protective wear ====
When handling feathers, wearing nitrile gloves will protect feathers from skin oils, as well as protect the skin from any harmful pollutants that may be on the feather. Protection for eyes and lungs may also be needed.

==== Support ====
Necessary in storage and display of featherwork is a proper support system. Materials that may function well in this regard are Tyvek and Ethafoam, which can be carved and shaped to fit unique objects.

==== Hazards ====
Due to the particularly high risk of deterioration from pests, many feathered objects and specimens have been treated historically with a variety of substances intended as a pesticide. These substances, including hazardous chemicals such as mercuric chloride, benzene, arsenic, strychnine and even dichlorodiphenyltrichloroethane (DDT) among others, were used in various mixtures and applied in both liquid and powdered form to objects in collections.

Residues from past applications of hazardous insecticides may be present even if not visible; therefore, the use of gloves, respirators, eye protection and other protective clothing can be used to avoid contact. During handling, feathers can be placed on tissue or a sheet of Tyvek to prevent the spread of pesticide residue onto the surrounding environment or workspace, and the use of a HEPA filtered vacuum can prevent the propagation of pesticide residue particles into the air.

If any pesticide residues are discovered, certain legal obligations may exist, such as NAGPRA in the US, that require the institution to notify the recipients of the objects about the presence of the hazardous substances.

== Interventive conservation ==
=== Cleaning ===
Removing debris and organic matter from feathers is a key step in the conservation process. Here are several of the ways that feathers are typically cleaned by conservators:

==== Dry cleaning ====
Using a small HEPA-filtered vacuum allows conservators to clean off dust and other particulate debris that is not embedded onto the feather. This method cannot be done by conservators when dealing with fragile feathers due to the likelihood of damage. Flat sable paintbrushes can also be used to remove light dust or dirt from feathered objects. Additionally, microfiber cloths are highly effective at removing and trapping dust. For contour feathers, latex-free cosmetic sponges can also be used as a dry-cleaning tool.

==== Solvents ====
Certain gentle soaps solvents are typically used to clean feathers and are mainly used for feathers that have not been dyed or painted in order to prevent color bleeding. One such solvent, isopropyl alcohol, is usually diluted to make it less caustic to the specimen. Isopropyl alcohol is also a fast-drying solution that will not cause the feathers to remain wet for an extended period of time. Diluting ethanol with water is an effective method for cleaning natural feathers that are free from dye. Gentle soaps and solvents will often also be used on living specimens when approved by a vet or zoologist.

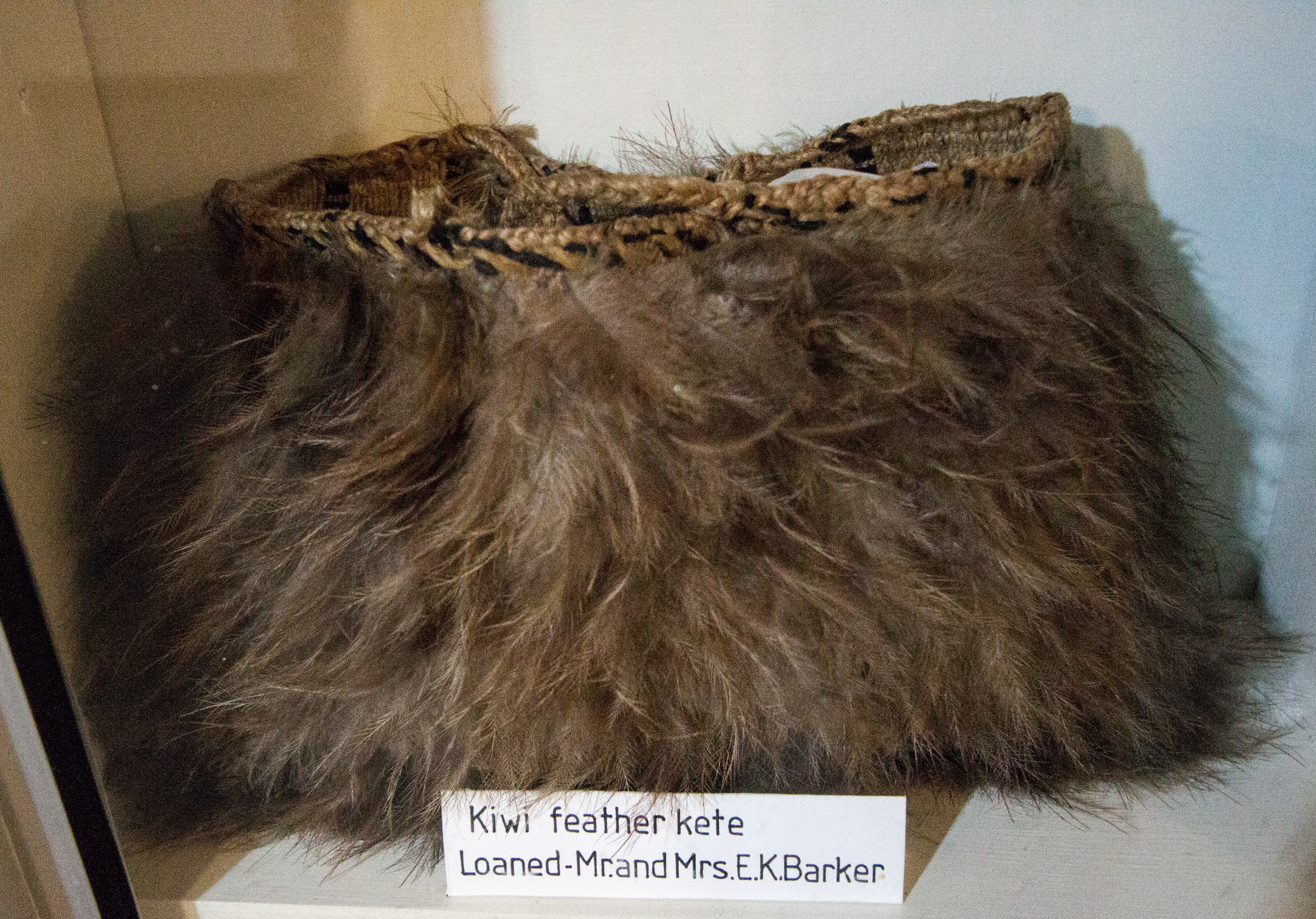
Feather Basket from the Warkworth Museum

=== Structural treatments ===
A living specimen can sometimes lose some of their vital flight feathers and there are ways of repairing them to restore flight to the bird. Feathers from another source are placed in the hollow portion of the quill and securing them with small splints. In the aviary world this process is called imping. A procedure such as this allows a bird to resume flight until the old quill falls out and a new feather takes its place during molting.

Mounted birds and feathers are repaired with several simple methods. Feathers that are tattered or messy can be moved back into shape with the use of mist, warm cotton compresses, or light steam. In the case of feathers that are falling out of a mount or broken in two, the pieces are reattached with small amounts of adhesive, or adhered to a splint to restore the feather's structure. Extreme care is always used to not get the adhesive stuck onto the barbs. A wheat starch paste adhesive is utilized in some cases to reattach feathers to skin or to each other.

== Resources ==
There are many different sources both online and in person to learn more about feather conservation. The AIC Wiki, as well as the AIC Wiki for Feathers, are jumping points into conservation topics, including the care of feathers. Many museums and conservation organizations are also providing classes in the conservation of feathers.

=== Further reading ===
Demouthe, Jean Frances. Natural materials sources, properties, and uses. Amsterdam; Boston; London: Elsevier/Architectural Press, 2006.

Pearlstein, Ellen J. The Conservation of Featherwork from Central and South America / Edited by Ellen Pearlstein. 2017. Print.

Wright, Margot M., and Conservators of Ethnographic Artefacts. The Conservation of Fur, Feather and Skin: Seminar Organised by the Conservators of Ethnographic Artefacts at the Museum of London on 11 December 2000 / Edited by Margot M. Wright. London: Archetype, 2002. Print. CEA Ser.; No. 3.
