= Graphium rubrum =

Scientific classification
- Kingdom: Fungi
- Division: Ascomycota
- Class: Sordariomycetes
- Order: Microascales
- Family: Microascaceae
- Genus: Graphium
- Species: G. rubrum

Binomial name
- Graphium rubrum Rumbold (1934)

Species of fungus

Graphium rubrum is a plant pathogen.
