= Wardomyces moseri =

Scientific classification
- Kingdom: Fungi
- Division: Ascomycota
- Class: Sordariomycetes
- Order: Microascales
- Family: Microascaceae
- Genus: Wardomyces
- Species: W. moseri

Binomial name
- Wardomyces moseri W.Gams (1995)

Species of fungus

Wardomyces moseri is a species of mold in the family Microascaceae. It was described as new to science by Walter Gams in 1995. The specific epithet honours mycologist Meinhard Moser "on the occasion of his 70th birthday". The type locality was a riverbank in the savanna area east of Villavicencio, Colombia. The fungus was discovered growing on a dead petiole of moriche palm (Mauritia flexuosa). It differs from other Wardomyces by having conidia that are readily liberated.
