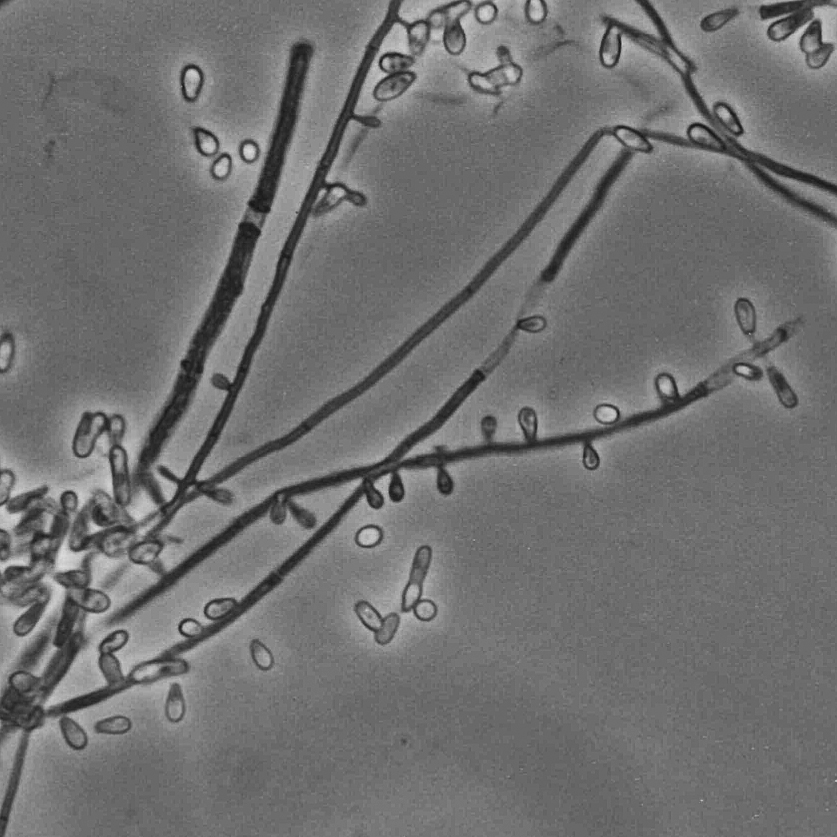

Scientific classification
- Kingdom: Fungi
- Division: Ascomycota
- Class: Eurotiomycetes
- Order: Onygenales
- Family: Onygenaceae
- Genus: Keratinophyton
- Species: K. durum

Binomial name
- Keratinophyton durum (Zukal) Currah (1985)

Synonyms
- Aphanoascus durus (Zukal) Cano & Guarro (1990); Gymnoascus durus Zukal (1890); Ascocalvatia dura (Zukal) Arx (1986); Anixiopsis biplanata Guého & Vroey (1985)

= Keratinophyton durum =

Species of fungus

Keratinophyton durum is a keratinophilic fungus, that grows on keratin found in decomposing or shed animal hair and bird feathers. Various studies conducted in Canada, Japan, India, Spain, Poland, Ivory Coast and Iraq have isolated this fungus from decomposing animal hair and bird feathers using SDA and hair-bait technique. Presence of fungus in soil sediments and their ability to decompose hairs make them a potential human pathogen.

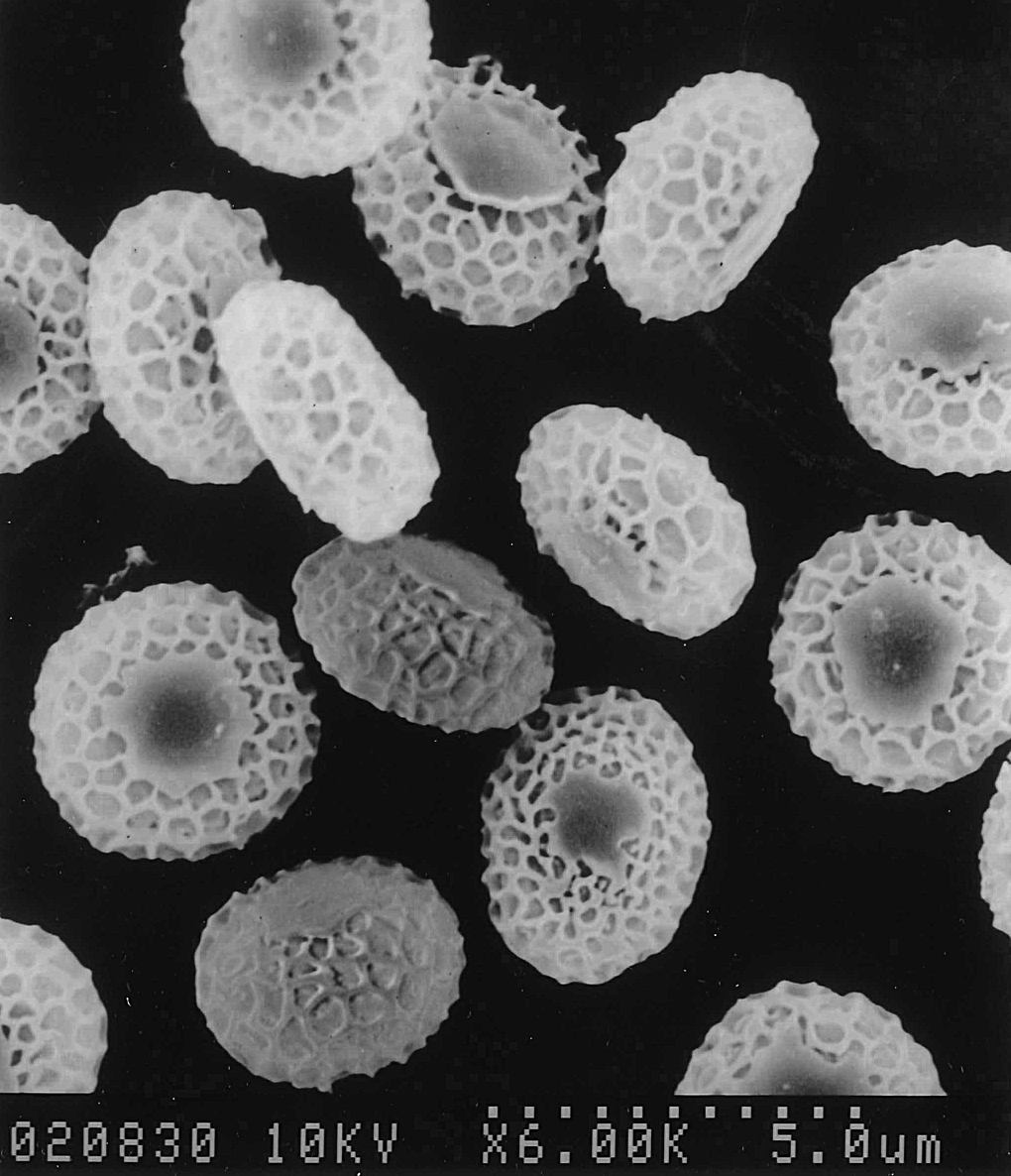
Strain UAMH 10061 ascospores in SEM

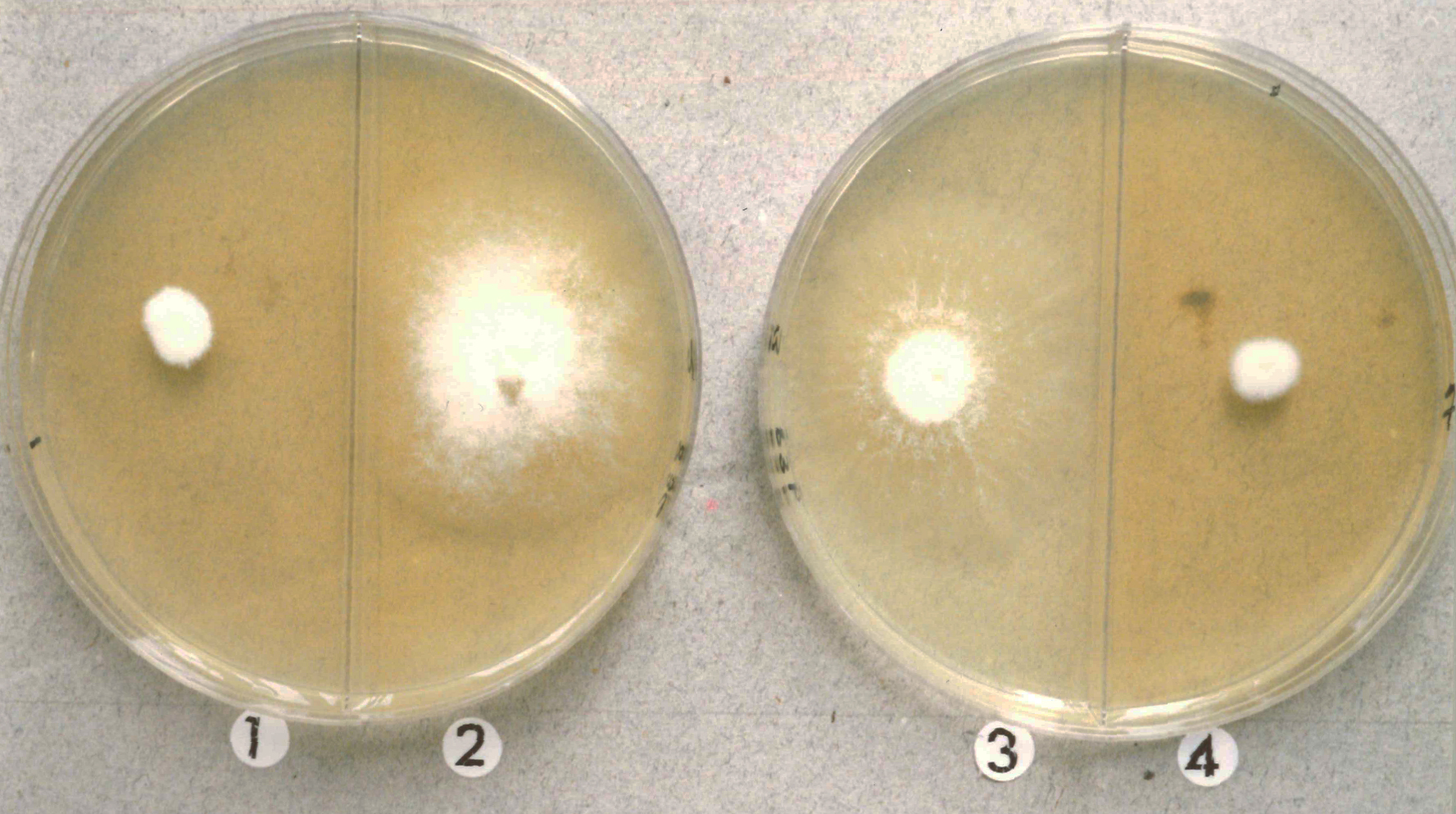
Strain UAMH 836 grown on Trichophyton agars (1–4) at 21 C for 35 days

== History and taxonomy ==
Keratinophyton durum was first described by Hugo Zukal in 1890 as Gymnoascus durus, and subsequently has been the subject of taxonomic confusion. Nearly 100 years after Zukal's description, Currah transferred the fungus from genus Gymnoascus to Keratinophyton (1985) and eventually to genus Aphanoascus (1986) due to similarity in their ascospores. At the same time, Guého and Vroey treated the fungus under the name, Anixiopsis biplanata (1986). The genera Aphanoascus and Anixiopsis have ascospores of similar appearance. This led to a debate within the mycological community upon its naming, wherein some mycologists used Anixiopsis biplanata and others used Aphanoascus durus to describe this species. Amidst this debate, the fungus was misclassified under the genus Ascocalvatia by von Arx in 1986. Ascocalvatia has cylindrical ascospores whereas Aphanoascus spores are flat and circular (oblate) in shape. Finally, in 1990 it was re-classified as Aphanoascus durus by Cano and Guarro. The name Keratinophyton durum was originally applied to the sexual state of the fungus (teleomorph), but now is used to include all life stages. The correct name for this species is K. durum.

== Genomic information ==
Listed below are identified gene sequences for this fungus.

| Gene type | Identification year | Partial sequence | Gene accession number |
|---|---|---|---|
| 5.8S rRNA gene and ITS 1 and 2, strain FMR 5651 | March 2003 | 601 bp linear DNA sequence | AJ439434 |
| 28S ribosomal RNA gene | June 2003 | 612 bp linear DNA sequence | AB075345 |
| 28S ribosomal RNA gene | October 2016 | 593 bp linear DNA sequence | KX492893 |

== Morphology and growth ==
Ascospores found within the ascoma, are oblate (shaped like an M&M candy) and yellow-yellowish brown in color when observed in transmitted light microscopy. Typically, the lateral sides of these ascospores are smooth with a bumpy, pitted equatorial edge. Ascospores of this fungus are similar in appearance (morphology) to those of A. terreus by Apnis (Cano & Guarro, Randhawa & Sandhu) A. clathratus and A. hispanicus by Cano & Guarro. Ascospores of A. terreus and A. hispanicus are small, pitted and diamond-shaped (rhomboid), whereas A. clathratus has circular (oblate) ascospores with reduced pitting. Ascomata are spherical (globose) to oval (subglobose), pale yellowish brown to dark reddish brown in color, and range from 280 to 800 μm in diameter. Ascomata are encased in white aerial hyphae and conidia.

In laboratory, this fungus can be grown on 2% malt agar, potato-carrot agar (PCA), phytone yeast extract agar (PYE) and yeast-starch agar (YpSs) growth mediums. On 2% malt agar, post 2-week incubation, K.durum colonies reach up to 35–40 mm in diameter. Colonies appear fluffy and white but have uneven growth. Mostly thinly spread colonies are denser at the centre and can reach 2 mm in height. Hyphae are usually branched, hyaline, smooth-walled and septate. Colonies also contain aleurioconidia. On potato-carrot agar (PCA), rapid growth is observed at 25 °C. Within 14 days of PCA culturing, circular colonies measuring 53–67 mm in diameter can be seen. Initial colonies appear white, but later on change their color and appear greenish grey. In this growth media, resulting ascomata are scattered and there is limited production of conidia. On phytone yeast extract agar (PYE), fungus grows rapidly into white-yellowish white colonies. While conidiogenesis is prominent, ascomata are not produced. On YpSs growth medium, under dark conditions and 28 °C, it grows at the rate of 2–3 mm per day. Cream-coloured colonies with smooth, septate, hyaline hyphae can be observed. Hyphae are thin-walled and wide, measuring 1.7–2.5 μm in width. Ascoma maturation can be observed in 20–23 days. Acomata are encased in round, dark-brown aerial mycelium measuring 500–1050 μm in diameter.

Additionally, the fungus can be isolated using a hair-baiting technique and followed by incubation on Sabouraud's dextrose agar (SDA). Isolation using Sabouraud's dextrose agar supplemented with (50 mg/L) chloramphenicol and cycloheximide (500 mg/L), requires 5–10 day, room temperature incubation. Similarly, hair baiting technique involving sterile human or horse hair can also be used to isolate this fungus from wet soils (rivers and lakes). Pocket-like surface erosion in human hair caused by this fungus can be observed under a light microscope following staining with lactophenol cotton blue.

== Habitat and ecology ==
Typically, it has been isolated from depth of 3–5 cm in soils containing decomposing feather and animal hair. K. durum is known from soils of Gir Forest National Park (India), Sanjay Gandhi National Park, Kaziranga national park, Lonar crater lake as well as Shatt Al-Arab river (Iraq). In terrestrial ecosystems, this fungus is predominantly found areas where there is increased animal and bird densities. In underwater sediments, it prefers alkaline pH conditions. A study conducted in Shatt Al-Arab river by Abdullah and Hassan, demonstrated that the soil pH range for this fungi is 6.9. It is also found in Lonar lake sediments where water is highly alkaline (pH of 10.5–11.2) with increased concentrations of sodium chloride, fluorides and bicarbonates.

== Pathogenicity ==
In their study, Deskhmukh & Verekar determined that it releases keratin at the rate of 234.6 μg/mL and is capable of decomposing 26.4% of human hair within four weeks of incubation. Since this fungus occurs in close proximity of animals and birds, it may be pathogenic to animal and humans.
