= Lophotrichus =

Scientific classification
- Kingdom: Fungi
- Division: Ascomycota
- Class: Sordariomycetes
- Order: Microascales
- Family: Microascaceae
- Genus: Lophotrichus; R.K. Benj.

Type species
- Lophotrichus ampullus R.K. Benj.

Genus of fungi

Lophotrichus is a genus of fungi in the family Microascaceae.

== Species ==
As accepted by Species Fungorum;

- Lophotrichus ampullus R.K. Benj. (1949)
- Lophotrichus bartlettii (Massee & E.S. Salmon) Malloch & Cain (1971)
- Lophotrichus geniculosporus Locq.-Lin. (1986)
- Lophotrichus incarnatus Seth (1971)
- Lophotrichus macrosporus (Faurel & Locq.-Lin.) Arx, Figueras & Guarro (1988)
- Lophotrichus martinii R.K. Benj. (1949)
- Lophotrichus medusoides Calvert, McTaggart & R.G. Shivas (2020)
- Lophotrichus plumbescens Morinaga, Minoura & Udagawa (1978)

Former species (all in Microascaceae family);

- L. brevirostratus L.M. Ames (1963) = Lophotrichus bartlettii
- L. fimeti (Arx, Mukerji & N. Singh) Gilgado, Guarro, Gené & Cano (2007) = Pseudallescheria fimeti
- L. setifer (Alf. Schmidt) Lodha (1978) = Petriella setifera
