= Frank Dunn Kern =

American mycologist

- Born: 29 June 1883; Reinbeck, Iowa, USA
- Died: 28 September 1973 (aged 90); State College, Pennsylvania, USA
- Education: Columbia University
- Known for: Pucciniales
- Children: 2
- Scientific career
- Fields: mycology; plant pathology
- Workplaces: Purdue Agricultural Experiment Station; Pennsylvania State University
- Thesis: A Biologic and Taxonomic Study of the Genus Gymnosporangium (1911)

Frank Dunn Kern (June 29, 1883 – September 28, 1973) was an American plant pathologist and university administrator. He was a faculty member at Pennsylvania State University, holding appointments as Head of the Department of Botany and Dean of the Graduate School. He was an expert on the Pucciniales (rust fungi).

== Personal life ==
Frank Dunn Kern was born 29 June 1883 in Reinbeck, Iowa, USA. He graduated from University of Iowa with a bachelor's degree in 1904 and a master's degree from Purdue University in 1907 His doctorate was awarded by Columbia University in 1911.

He married and had two daughters.

After retirement he continued to live in State College and he died there on September 28, 1973.

== Career ==
Kern worked in several places between 1904 and 1913. These included for the United States Department of Agriculture, the Purdue Agricultural Experimental Station, the New York Botanical Garden and (in 1910) as a Fellow in Botany at Columbia University. His doctoral thesis was submitted successfully to Columbia University in 1911. He was an instructor at Purdue University from 1910 until he was appointed to the faculty of Pennsylvania State College in 1913, where he stayed for the rest of his career. He became Head of the Botany Department and in 1922 was appointed Dean of the new Graduate School. From 1925 - 1926 and 1933 - 1934 Kern was Acting Dean of the Colleges of Agriculture and Engineering at the University of Puerto Rico.

Kern's research and expertise was in plant pathology, especially the rust fungi. He worked on the genus Gymnosporangium (cedar apple rusts) until his death. He undertook a number of visits to explore the fungi of Southern America. These including collaboration with Carlos E. Chardón to explore the rust and smut fungi of Puerto Rico as well as other collaborations about rusts in Venezuela, Colombia and Santo Domingo.

In 1908 he was among the founding members of the American Phytopathological Society, acting as vice president in 1914, and in 1922 was the author of the first publication in the Society's scientific journal Phytopathology.

In 1924 he was a founding member of the Pennsylvania Academy of Science and President of the Academy in 1929.

He retired in 1950.

== Publications ==
Kern was author or co-author of over 80 scientific publications, including 20 after his retirement and 2 posthumously. Among the most significant are:

Kern, Frank D., (1947) The Essentials Of Plant Biology Harper & Brothers Publishers

Kern, Frank D., Revised Taxonomic Account of the Genus Gymnosporangium. (revised edition 1973) Pennsylvania State University Press.

Kern, F. D. and H. H. Whetzel. (1926) Some New and Interesting Porto Rican Rusts. Mycologia 18 39-47

Kern, F. D. (1928) Fungi of Santo Domingo II. Uredinales. Mycologia. 20 60–82.

== Awards and recognition ==
He was awarded D Sc by University of Puerto Rico in 1926.

In 1945 he was president of the Mycological Society of America and vice-president of the American Association for the Advancement of Science.

Three fungal genera, Kernia which is a genus of fungi in the family Microascaceae, then Kernella Thirum. within the Pucciniaceae family and Kerniomyces Toro. within the Schizothyriaceae, are named after him.

== Legacy ==
In 1971 the new graduate center at Penn State University was named the Kern Graduate Building.
