= Microascus manginii =

Scientific classification
- Kingdom: Fungi
- Division: Ascomycota
- Class: Sordariomycetes
- Order: Microascales
- Family: Microascaceae
- Genus: Microascus
- Species: M. manginii

Binomial name
- Microascus manginii (Loubière) Curzi (1931)

Synonyms
- Nephrospora manginii Loubière (1923); Scopulariopsis candida Vuill. (1911); Monilia candida Guég. (1899); Chrysosporium keratinophilum var. denticola C. Moreau (1969)

Species of fungus

Microascus manginii is a filamentous fungal species in the genus Microascus. It produces both sexual (teleomorph) and asexual (anamorph) reproductive stages known as M. manginii and Scopulariopsis candida, respectively. Several synonyms appear in the literature because of taxonomic revisions and re-isolation of the species by different researchers. M. manginii is saprotrophic and commonly inhabits soil, indoor environments and decaying plant material. It is distinguishable from closely related species by its light colored and heart-shaped ascospores used for sexual reproduction. Scopulariopsis candida has been identified as the cause of some invasive infections, often in immunocompromised hosts, but is not considered a common human pathogen. There is concern about amphotericin B resistance in S. candida.

== History and taxonomy ==
The anamorph was first documented, unintentionally, by Professor Fernand-Pierre-Joseph Guéguen in 1899 who mistook it for the species, Monilia candida, previously described in 1851 by Hermann Friedrich Bonorden. In 1911, Jean Paul Vuillemin determined that the two taxa were distinct, noting that the taxon described by Bonorden was a yeast whereas the strain that was the subject of Guéguen's studies was filamentous and produced true conidia. Vuillemin formally described the latter as S. candida. At the same time, he re-described Bonordeon's yeast taxon, Monilia candida, as Monilia bonordenii. Subsequent researchers described taxa that have since been reduced to synonymy with S. candida, including: S. alboflavescens in 1934, S. brevicaulis var. glabra in 1949, Chrysosporium keratinophilum var. denticola in 1969 and Basipetospora denticola in 1971.

The teleomorph was discovered by Auguste Loubière in 1923 and named Nephrospora manginii in honour of his mentor, Professor Louis Mangin. It was later transferred to the genus Microascus by Mario Curzi in 1931. Curzi did not provide an explanation for this transfer. S. candida and M. manginii are used in the literature to describe the same species. However, recent changes to the International Code of Nomenclature for algae, fungi and plants have terminated the use of dual nomenclature for fungal species with multiple forms. It is not yet known which name will take priority for this fungus in the future.

== Growth and morphology ==
=== Sexual form ===
Colonies of M. manginii are pale, white and rapid growing. Growth is tolerant of cycloheximide and restricted at 37 °C. The vegetative hyphae are septate and appear glassy (hyaline). Ascomata are the sexual structures within which ascospores are produced in sacs called asci. The ascomata of M. manginii are spherical, smooth-walled, dark-brown to black and 100–175 μm in size. These fruiting bodies are also called perithecia because of their flask-like shape wherein asci grow at the base and an opening allows for the release of mature ascospores. They are also papillate with short cone-shaped projections at the opening, sessile, and rich in carbon. Perithecia manifest as small black dots organized in concentric rings. An incubation period of over two weeks may be necessary for the production of perithecia. The asci are shaped similar to an upside-down egg where the apex is broad and thicker than the base. They are 11–16 × 8–13 μm in size and contain 8 ascospores. Ascospores are nonseptate and smooth-walled. They are characteristically uniform in heart-shape and pale, straw-colored when mature - but appear reddish-brown as a mass. They each have a single inconspicuous germ pore, which is a predetermined spot in the spore cell wall where the germ tube emerges during germination. Ascospores are 5–6 × 4.5–5 μm in size. M. manginii is a heterothallic species and as a result, generation of sexual spores requires mating between two compatible individuals.

=== Asexual form ===
S. candida is a hyaline mold with septate hyphae. The white and membranous morphology of S. candida colonies differentiates it from the more common species S. brevicaulis, which is characterized by a sand-coloured and granular colonial morphology. As the colony ages, it becomes slightly yellow. Conidiophores are specialized hyphal stalks that have conidiogenous cells which produce conidia for asexual reproduction. The Latin word for broom, scopula, was chosen as the basis of the generic name due to the broom-like appearance of the conidiophores of Scopulariopsis. In S. candida, these structures are 10–20 μm in length. S. candida sporulates using specialized conidiogenous cells called annellide. The tip of the cell elongates and narrows each time a conidium is formed and results in a series of ring-like scars called annellations near the tip. The annelloconidia are formed in dry chains that eventually break off to allow the dispersal of spores by wind. They are one-celled, smooth- and thick-walled, and round but also broad-based. They resemble simple yeasts. Annelloconidia are hyaline and 6–8 × 5–6 μm in size. The smooth hyaline annelloconidia can also distinguish S. candida from S. brevicaulis, which has conidia that are rough-walled, truncate and covered in tiny, thorny outgrowths. Isolates of S. candida can produce sterile perithecia-like structures.

== Physiology ==
The optimal growth temperature range for S. candida is 24–30 °C (75–86 °F), with a minimum of 5 °C and maximum 37 °C. It is a keratinophilic species which may contribute to its role in nail infections. It grows well on protein-rich surfaces and is able to digest α-keratins. In vitro study of antifungal susceptibilities reports S. candida as relatively more resistant to the antifungal drug amphotericin B, and susceptible to Itraconazole and miconazole.

== Habitat and ecology ==
M. manginii is a saprobic fungus. It has a worldwide distribution. It is often isolated from decaying plant material, soil and indoor environments, but also human skin and nails, dust, chicken litter, atmosphere, book paper and cheese, among other locations. Contaminated dust, soil and air samples are often found in North America and Europe. In Portugal, S. candida was identified as the most prevalent fungal species contaminating the air of three poultry slaughterhouses in 2016. Contamination with fungal pathogens was found on equipment used in physiotherapy clinics in Brazil, specifically electrodes and ultrasound transducers, S. candida was found on several contact electrodes.

== Pathogenicity ==
Invasive fungal infections are becoming increasingly common in patients who are immunocompromised. M. manginii and S. candida are not traditionally recognized as common human pathogens. However, they were identified as opportunistic human and plant pathogens in a few reported cases. Other Scopulariopsis species have been associated with nail infection and keratitis (S. brevicaulis), and brain abscess and hypersensitivity pneumonitis (S. brumptii).

A case of disseminated infection caused by Scopulariopsis species in a 17-year old patient with chronic myelogenous leukemia was described in 1987. After receiving an allogenic bone marrow transplantation for cancer treatment, the patient complained of recurrent fever, nosebleeds, and abnormal sensations of the nose. Amphotericin B therapy was administered but symptoms persisted. Within two months of transplant, the patient experienced a short period of improvement followed by rapid deterioration and death. The autopsy discovered Scopulariopsis species in the lungs, blood, brain and nasal septum, and exhibited high resistance to amphotericin B in vitro. In 1989, the species responsible for the disseminated infection was identified as S. candida.

S. candida was identified as the cause of invasive sinusitis in a 12-year old girl undergoing treatment for non-Hodgkin's lymphoma in 1992. This is the second reported case of invasive sinus disease caused by Scopulariopsis species and only reported case due to S. candida. The patient was immunocompromised at the time of fungal infection due to ongoing cancer treatment. The clinical presentation resembled an infection by fungi in the order Mucorales, and involved myalgia, cheek swelling and tenderness, a week-long fever, and extensive necrosis of maxillary sinuses. As a result, the presumed diagnosis was mucormycosis until further examination of patient specimens showed abundant growth of a powdery, tan mold that was distinguished as S. candida by several features (e.g., septate hyphae, round and smooth conidia, broom-shaped conidiophores). The patient immediately received surgical drainage and debridement of damaged tissue, and amphotericin B to treat the fungal infection. Subsequent identification of S. candida as the cause of disease prompted administration of additional antifungal medication, Itraconazole, to address potential amphotericin B resistance. The patient was cured of invasive sinusitis with no signs of progressive sinus disease. This marked the first successful treatment of an invasive infection caused by Scopulariopsis species in an immunocompromised host. Immunosuppression was suspected to play a role in the ability of S. candida to cause invasive infection. The most significant contributor to managing the disease was likely strengthening the patient's immune system by suspending chemotherapy and administrating granulocyte colony-stimulating factor.

S. candida and M. manginii have been identified in cases of onychomycoses. They mainly cause tissue damage to the big toe and rarely other nails. Common symptoms include difficulty walking while wearing shoes, thickening and discolouration of nails, and deformation of nails. The infection often begins at the lateral edge of the nail instead of the proximal edge. Patients are typically middle-aged or older. The mechanism of these infections is not well-characterized. In addition, the published cases of onychomycoses caused by these species are not all reliable.
