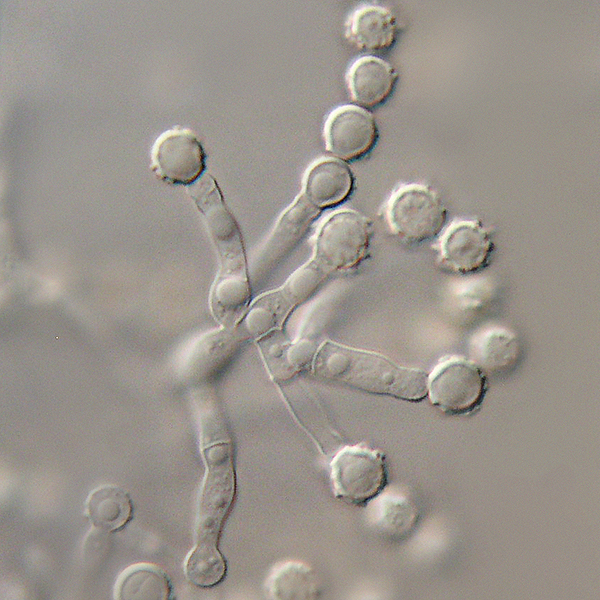
- Microascus brevicaulis

Scientific classification
- Kingdom: Fungi
- Division: Ascomycota
- Class: Sordariomycetes
- Order: Microascales
- Family: Microascaceae
- Genus: Microascus; Zukal

Type species
- Microascus longirostris Zukal

= Microascus =

Genus of fungi

Microascus is a genus of fungi in the family Microascaceae.

== History ==
It was introduced by Luttrell (1951) to accommodate genus Microascus which was originally placed in family Ophiostomataceae (Nannfeldt 1932,) or Eurotiaceae in Eunotiales order, (Moreau and Moreau 1953; Emmons and Dodge 1931; Doguet 1957). Then Malloch (1970) validated the family and accepted genera, Kernia, Lophotrichus and Petriellidium in the family. It has 60 species in 2023.

== Species ==
As accepted by Species Fungorum;

- Microascus aculeatus B.D Sun, Y.G. Zhou & A.J. Chen (2020)
- Microascus albonigrescens (Sopp) Curzi (1931)
- Microascus alveolaris Sand.-Den., Gené & Guarro (2015)
- Microascus anfractus Z.F. Zhang, F. Liu & L. Cai (2017)
- Microascus appendiculatus Woudenb. & Samson (2017)
- Microascus atrogriseus Woudenb. & Samson (2017)
- Microascus boulangeri (Curzi) Lodha (1978)
- Microascus brevicaulis S.P. Abbott (1998)
- Microascus brunneosporus Sand.-Den., Gené & Guarro (2015)
- Microascus campaniformis Sand.-Den., Cano & Deanna A. Sutton (2015)
- Microascus chartarum (G. Sm.) Sand.-Den., Gené & Guarro (2015)
- Microascus chinensis Jin Yu, Sand.-Den. & Gené (2016)
- Microascus cinereus Curzi (1931)
- Microascus cirrosus Curzi (1930)
- Microascus cleistocarpus Woudenb., X.Wei Wang & Samson (2017)
- Microascus collaris Z.F. Zhang & L. Cai (2020)
- Microascus croci (J.F.H. Beyma) Sand.-Den., Gené & Guarro (2015)
- Microascus decorticatus C. Ram (1972)
- Microascus desmosporus (Lechmere) Curzi (1931)
- Microascus doguetii C. Moreau (1953)
- Microascus ennothomasiorum Brasch, Beck-Jendroschek, K. Voss, Iturrieta-Gonzalez & Gené (2018)
- Microascus expansus Sand.-Den., Gené & Cano (2015)
- Microascus fusisporus Woudenb. & Samson (2017)
- Microascus globulosus Z.F. Zhang, F. Liu & L. Cai (2017)
- Microascus gracilis (Samson) Sand.-Den., Gené & Guarro (2015)
- Microascus hollandicus Woudenb. & Samson (2017)
- Microascus hyalinus (Malloch & Cain) Sand.-Den., Gené & Guarro (2015)
- Microascus inopinatus Udagawa & Furuya (1978)
- Microascus intricatus Sand.-Den., Stchigel & Deanna A. Sutton (2015)
- Microascus levis Z.F. Zhang & L. Cai (2020)
- Microascus longicollis Hubka, Lysková, Cmokova & M. Kolařík (2016)
- Microascus longirostris Zukal (1886)
- Microascus lunasporus P.M. Jones (1936)
- Microascus macrosporus (G.F. Orr) Sand.-Den., Gené & Guarro (2015)
- Microascus manginii (Loubière) Curzi (1931)
- Microascus melanosporus (Udagawa) Woudenb. & Samson (2017)
- Microascus microcordiformis Matsush. (1996)
- Microascus micronesiensis Woudenb., Seifert & Samson (2017)
- Microascus murinus (Samson & Klopotek) Sand.-Den., Gené & Guarro (2015)
- Microascus niger (Sopp) Curzi (1931)
- Microascus onychoides Jin Yu, Sand.-Den. & Gené (2016)
- Microascus paisii (Pollacci) Sand.-Den., Gené & Guarro (2015)
- Microascus pedrosoi C.A. Fuentes & F.A. Wolf (1956)
- Microascus pilosus Valldos. & Guarro (1993)
- Microascus pseudolongirostris Jagielski, Sand.-Den., Krzyściak & Gené (2016)
- Microascus pseudopaisii Woudenb. & Samson (2017)
- Microascus pyramidus G.L. Barron & J.C. Gilman (1961)
- Microascus restrictus Sand.-Den., Gené & Deanna A. Sutton (2015)
- Microascus senegalensis Arx (1975)
- Microascus singularis (Sacc.) Malloch & Cain (1971)
- Microascus soppii S.P. Abbott (2002)
- Microascus sparsimycelialis Z.F. Zhang & L. Cai (2020)
- Microascus spinosporus B.D Sun, Y.G. Zhou & A.J. Chen (2020)
- Microascus superficialis Z.F. Zhang & L. Cai (2020)
- Microascus tardifaciens Y. Horie & Udagawa (1983)
- Microascus terreus (Kamyschko) Jagielski, Sand.-Den. & Gené (2016)
- Microascus trautmannii Woudenb. & Samson (2017)
- Microascus trigonosporus C.W. Emmons & B.O. Dodge (1931)
- Microascus trigonus Z.F. Zhang & L. Cai (2020)
- Microascus verrucosus Sand.-Den., Gené & Cano (2015)

Former species;

- M. americanus Sacc. (1916) = Microdiscus americanus, Helotiales
- M. caviariformis Malloch & Hubart (1987) = Acaulium caviariforme
- M. desmosporus var. macroperithecius Sage, Steiman, Seigle-Mur. & Guiraud (1995) = Microascus desmosporus
- M. exsertus Skou (1973) = Pithoascus exsertus
- M. giganteus Malloch (1970) = Wardomyces giganteus
- M. guttulatus (G.L. Barron & Cain) Lodha (1978) = Petriella guttulata
- M. intermedius C.W. Emmons & B.O. Dodge (1931) = Pithoascus nidicola
- M. lindforsii (Curzi) Lodha (1978) = Petriella lindforsii
- M. nidicola Massee & E.S. Salmon (1901) = Pithoascus nidicola
- M. schumacheri (E.C. Hansen) Curzi (1931) = Pseudoscopulariopsis schumacheri
- M. setifer Alf. Schmidt (1912) = Petriella setifera
- M. sordidus Zukal (1890) = Petriella sordida
- M. stoveri (Arx) S.P. Abbott (2002) = Pithoascus stoveri
- M. stysanophorus (Mattir.) Curzi (1930) = Pithoascus stysanophorus
- M. trigonosporus var. macroperithecius Sage, Steiman, Seigle-Mur. & Guiraud (1995) = Microascus trigonosporus
- M. trigonosporus var. macrosporus G.F. Orr (1961) = Microascus macrosporus
- M. trigonosporus var. terreus Kamyschko (1966) = Microascus terreus
- M. variabilis Massee & E.S. Salmon (1901) = Microascus longirostris
