= Graphium rigidum =

Scientific classification
- Kingdom: Fungi
- Division: Ascomycota
- Class: Sordariomycetes
- Order: Microascales
- Family: Microascaceae
- Genus: Graphium
- Species: G. rigidum

Binomial name
- Graphium rigidum (Pers.) Sacc. (1886)

Synonyms
- Stilbum rigidum Pers. (1794); Ceratopodium rigidum (Pers.) Kuntze (1891); Stilbum nigrum DC. (1806); Stilbum rigidum subsp. nigrum (DC.) Pers. (1822); Stilbum rigidum var. atrum Pers. (1822)

Species of fungus

Graphium rigidum is a species of fungus in the family Microascaceae. It is a plant pathogen. The fungus was originally described as new to science in 1794 by Christiaan Hendrik Persoon, as Stilbum rigidum. Pier Andrea Saccardo transferred it to the genus Graphium in 1886.
