= Wardomyces =

Scientific classification
- Kingdom: Fungi
- Division: Ascomycota
- Class: Sordariomycetes
- Order: Microascales
- Family: Microascaceae
- Genus: Wardomyces; F.T.Brooks & Hansf. (1923)

Type species
- Wardomyces anomalus F.T.Brooks & Hansf. (1923)

Genus of fungi

Wardomyces is a genus of seven species of mould fungi in the family Microascaceae. The genus was circumscribed in 1923 by Frederick Tom Brooks and Clifford Gerald Hansford. The generic name honours Harry Marshall Ward, Professor of Botany at Cambridge University. The type species, Wardomyces anomalus, was originally found as a mould growing on rabbit meat kept in cold storage. The most recent addition to the genus is W. moseri, described by Walter Gams in 1995. Found in Colombia, it was discovered growing on a dead petiole of moriche palm (Mauritia flexuosa).

== Species ==
- Wardomyces anomalus F.T.Brooks & Hansf. 1923
- Wardomyces columbinus (Demelius) Hennebert 1968
- Wardomyces humicola Hennebert & G.L.Barron 1962
- Wardomyces inflatus (Marchal) Hennebert 1962
- Wardomyces moseri W.Gams 1995
- Wardomyces ovalis W.Gams 1968
- Wardomyces pulvinatus (Marchal) C.H.Dickinson 1964
