= Canariomyces =

Scientific classification
- Kingdom: Fungi
- Division: Ascomycota
- Class: Sordariomycetes
- Order: Microascales
- Family: Microascaceae
- Genus: Canariomyces; Arx

Type species
- Canariomyces notabilis Arx

Genus of fungi

Canariomyces is a genus of fungi in the family Microascaceae.
