= Scopulariopsis =

Scientific classification
- Kingdom: Fungi
- Division: Ascomycota
- Class: Sordariomycetes
- Order: Microascales
- Family: Microascaceae
- Genus: Scopulariopsis; Bainier (1907)

Type species
- Scopulariopsis brevicaulis (Sacc.) Bainier (1907)

Genus of fungi

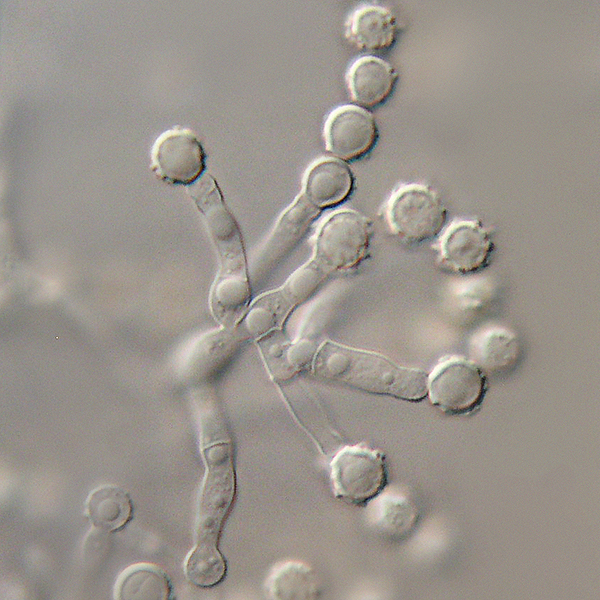
Scopulariopsis brevicaulis

Scopulariopsis is a genus of anamorphic fungi that are saprobic and pathogenic to animals. The widespread genus contains 22 species. Scopulariopsis belongs to the group Hyphomycetes. These species are commonly found in soil, decaying wood, and various other plant and animal products. In indoor environment Scopulariopsis is found on dry walls, cellulose board, wallpaper, wood, and mattress dust. Species of Scopulariopsis have also been isolated from carpets, hospital floors, swimming pools, wooden food packing, shoes and wood pulp. Scopulariopsis species are sometimes encountered growing on meat in storage. Some of the common species are S. brevicaulis, S. brumptii, S. candida and S. asperula.
