= Doratomyces =

Scientific classification
- Domain: Eukaryota
- Kingdom: Fungi
- Division: Ascomycota
- Class: Sordariomycetes
- Order: Microascales
- Family: Microascaceae
- Genus: Doratomyces; Corda (1829)

Type species
- Doratomyces neesii Corda (1829)

Species
- D. asperulus D. columnaris D. microsporus D. neesii D. purpureofuscus D. stemonitis

Synonyms
- Synpenicillium Costantin (1888)

Genus of fungi

Doratomyces (Dor-ah-toe-mice’-ees) is a genus of the fungi imperfecti, closely related to Scopulariopsis. Their conidiophores gather together to form a stalk-like inflorescence known as a synnema or coremia; Scopulariopsis being distinguished in their lack of such a structure.

Usually associated with decay, they are usually found in association with dead wood, rotting plants, and in soil or dung. Economically, they can cause rot in potatoes, oats and corn.
