= Cephalotrichum =

Scientific classification
- Domain: Eukaryota
- Kingdom: Fungi
- Division: Ascomycota
- Class: Sordariomycetes
- Order: Microascales
- Family: Microascaceae
- Genus: Cephalotrichum; Link, 1809

Genus of fungi

Cephalotrichum is a genus of fungi belonging to the family Microascaceae.

== Species ==
As accepted by Species Fungorum;

- Cephalotrichum acutisporum J.J. Xu & T.Y. Zhang (2011)
- Cephalotrichum asperulum (J.E. Wright & S. Marchand) Sand.-Den., Guarro & Gené (2016)
- Cephalotrichum brevistipitatum Sand.-Den., Guarro & Gené (2016)
- Cephalotrichum caespitosum Demelius (1923)
- Cephalotrichum castaneum (Y.L. Jiang & T.Y. Zhang) Y.L. Jiang & T.Y. Zhang (2011)
- Cephalotrichum commune Demelius (1923)
- Cephalotrichum cylindricum (Clem. & Shear) S.P. Abbott (2016)
- Cephalotrichum cylindrosporum Y.L. Zhang & T.Y. Zhang (2011)
- Cephalotrichum dendrocephalum (Udagawa, Y. Horie & Abdullah) S.P. Abbott (2016)
- Cephalotrichum domesticum Woudenb. & Seifert (2017)
- Cephalotrichum ellipsoideum H.Q. Pan & T.Y. Zhang (2011)
- Cephalotrichum gorgonifer (Bainier) Sand.-Den., Gené & Guarro (2016)
- Cephalotrichum guizhouense J.R. Jiang, L. Cai & F. Liu (2017)
- Cephalotrichum heliciforme T.Y. Zhang (2014)
- Cephalotrichum hinnuleum Sand.-Den., Guarro & Gené (2016)
- Cephalotrichum inflatum Y.L. Jiang & T.Y. Zhang (2011)
- Cephalotrichum laeve J.R. Jiang, L. Cai & F. Liu (2017)
- Cephalotrichum lignatile Woudenb. & Seifert (2017)
- Cephalotrichum longicollum Y.L. Jiang & T.Y. Zhang (2011)
- Cephalotrichum macrosporum Y.L. Jiang & T.Y. Zhang (2011)
- Cephalotrichum medium (Sacc.) S. Hughes (1958)
- Cephalotrichum microsporum (Sacc.) P.M. Kirk (1984)
- Cephalotrichum nanum (Ehrenb.) S. Hughes (1958)
- Cephalotrichum oblongum J.J. Xu & T.Y. Zhang (2011)
- Cephalotrichum oligotrophicum J.R. Jiang, L. Cai & F. Liu (2017)
- Cephalotrichum ovoideum Y.L. Jiang & T.Y. Zhang (2011)
- Cephalotrichum purpureofuscum (S. Hughes) S. Hughes (1958)
- Cephalotrichum robustum Y.L. Jiang & T.Y. Zhang (2011)
- Cephalotrichum septatum Demelius (1923)
- Cephalotrichum spirale H.M. Liu, H.Q. Pan & T.Y. Zhang (2011)
- Cephalotrichum stemonitis (Pers.) Nees (1809)
- Cephalotrichum telluricum Woudenb. & Seifert (2017)
- Cephalotrichum tenuissimum Woudenb. & Seifert (2017)
- Cephalotrichum terricola Y.L. Jiang & T.Y. Zhang (2011)
- Cephalotrichum transvaalense Woudenb. & Seifert (2017)
- Cephalotrichum turriforme T.Y. Zhang, Y.L. Jiang & Y.M. Wu (2017)
- Cephalotrichum verrucipes Y.L. Jiang & T.Y. Zhang (2011)
- Cephalotrichum verrucisporum (Y.L. Jiang & T.Y. Zhang) Y.L. Jiang & T.Y. Zhang (2011)

Former species (all family Microascaceae unless stated);

- C. album (Costantin) Seifert (2013) = Acaulium album
- C. aspergilloides (Speg.) Kuntze (1898) = Papilionospora aspergilloides, Ascomycota
- C. atrum (Desm.) Kuntze (1898) = Phaeostilbella nigra, Hypocreales
- C. azaleae (Peck) Kuntze (1898) = Seifertia azaleae, Ascomycota
- C. berlesianum (Sacc. & Roum.) Kuntze (1898) = Sporocybe berlesiana, Pleosporales
- C. brassicicola (Berk. & Broome) Kuntze (1898) = Cephalotrichum purpureofuscum
- C. brevipes (Wallr.) Kuntze (1898) = Cephalotrichum purpureofuscum
- C. byssoides (Pers.) Kuntze (1898) = Periconia byssoides, Pleosporales
- C. calycioides (Fr.) Kuntze (1898) = Exophiala calicioides, Herpotrichiellaceae
- C. columnare (H.J. Swart) S.P. Abbott (2016) = Kernia columnaris
- C. cuneiferum (Berk. & Broome) Kuntze (1898) = Parascedosporium putredinis
- C. curtum Berk. (1841) = Periconia curta, Pleosporales
- C. echinatum (Rivolta) Toro (1932) = Stachybotrys echinatus, Stachybotryaceae
- C. leucocephalum Wallr. (1833) = Cephalotrichum purpureofuscum
- C. phillipsii (Berk. & Leight.) S. Hughes (1958) = Leightoniomyces phillipsii, Ascomycota
- C. portoricense (F. Stevens & Dalbey) Toro (1932) = Periconiella portoricensis, Mycosphaerellaceae
- C. resinae (Fr.) Kuntze (1898) = Sorocybe resinae, Amorphothecaceae
- C. rhopaloides (Sacc. & Roum.) Kuntze (1898) = Sporocybe rhopaloides, Pleosporales
- C. setosum (Wallr.) Kuntze (1898) = Cephalotrichum stemonitis
- C. sphaerophilum (Peck) Kuntze (1898) = Scopinella sphaerophila, Hypocreales
