= Pennsylvania Academy of Science =

American learned society

The Pennsylvania Academy of Science, Inc.
- Established: 1924
- Type: Nonprofit professional society (IRS exemption status): 501(c)(3)
- Purpose: Academy will strive to embrace all disciplines of science and help ensure the scholarly and ethical pursuit of all scientific endeavors
- Headquarters: East Stroudsburg, Pennsylvania, U.S.
- Region served: Pennsylvania and Worldwide
- Method: Memberships, grants, and endowments
- Key people: Andre Walther, President, Tammy Tintjer, President-Elect, Matthew Wallace, Immediate Past-President
- Website: pennsci.org

The Pennsylvania Academy of Science was founded and organized on April 18, 1924, and is an independent non-profit organization that strives "to embrace all disciplines of science and help ensure the scholarly and ethical pursuit of all scientific endeavors." Today the Pennsylvania Academy of Science has members throughout the United States and in other countries. The current president is Tammy Tintjer of King's College and the President-Elect is Rachael Zhu of Wilson College. Andre Walther of Cedar Crest College serves as Immediate-Past President.

== History ==
During the American Association of Academies of Science meeting in December 1923, a group led by E.M. Gress, C.R. Orton, and W.A. McCubbin was formed to determine interest in starting an Academy of Science in Pennsylvania. The efforts that included 2,000 questionnaires culminated in a meeting held on April 18, 1924, in Harrisburg, Pennsylvania, and led by Frank D. Kern and S.H. Derickson. Officers including Otto E. Jennings (President), C.E. McClung (vice-president), Joseph S. Illick (Secretary), T.L. Guyton (Assistant-Secretary), Frank D. Kern (Treasurer), George H. Ashley (Editor), and J.P. Kelley (Press Secretary) were elected and two committees were formed Nominating and Constitution. Later that year, an Executive Meeting was held in the Senate Caucus Room in Harrisburg, Pennsylvania on November 28, 1924, where Pennsylvania Governor Gifford Pinchot attended. The First Annual Meeting was held from April 10 to 11, 1925 in the Senate Caucus Room, and the Constitution of the academy was adopted.

The early members were prominent in Pennsylvania Science. Otto E. Jennings was a Curator of Botany at the Carnegie Museum and Professor of Biological Sciences at the University of Pittsburgh. Frank D. Kern was a professor at the then Pennsylvania State College and now has a graduate building named after him. Gifford Pinchot, who at the time was Governor of Pennsylvania, was the first chief of the United States Forest Service and a forester to George Vanderbilt at his Biltmore Estate in Asheville, North Carolina.

== Publications ==
=== Proceedings of the Pennsylvania Academy of Science ===
The first volume of the Proceedings of the Pennsylvania Academy of Science was published in 1926 and covered the years 1924 to 1926. The Proceedings included meeting minutes and peer-reviewed papers of the Pennsylvania Academy of Science. The Proceedings was published until 1987 at which point the Journal of the Pennsylvania Academy of Science began.

=== Journal of the Pennsylvania Academy of Science ===
The Journal of the Pennsylvania Academy of Science began with Volume 62 in 1988, and continues to the present.

=== Books published by the Pennsylvania Academy of Science ===
In 1981, The Pennsylvania Academy of Science published Energy, Environment, and Economy and has since published numerous books on various topics of interest to Pennsylvania Scientists.

== Programs ==
=== Pennsylvania Junior Academy of Science ===
The Pennsylvania Junior Academy of Science was formed in 1934 and includes students in grades 7–12 in Pennsylvania. Here students can participate in regional scientific meets and a statewide meet in State College, Pennsylvania.

=== Pennsylvania Academy of Science Undergraduate and Graduate Research Grants ===
Every year the Pennsylvania Academy of Science gives research grants to undergraduate and graduate students.

== Awards ==
=== Darbaker Prize ===
The Darbaker Prize is awarded to the best paper each year in Microscopial Biology.

=== Karl F. Orlein Award in Science ===
This award established by the first president of the Pennsylvania Junior Academy of Science goes to outstanding papers in the Junior Academy of Science.

=== D.E. Zappa Engineering Endowment Fund ===
Honors two Junior Academy of Science State winners each year.

== Notable Members ==
- Stuart Frost (1891-1980), Professor of Entomology at Pennsylvania State University and Frost Entomological Museum namesake
- Otto E. Jennings (1877- 1964), Founding Member and first President of the academy in 1924. Otto was a botanist and Director of the Carnegie Museum in Pittsburgh, Pennsylvania.
- Frank D. Kern (1883-1973), Professor of Biology at Pennsylvania State College, founding member, and President of the Pennsylvania Academy of Science in 1929
- Clarence E. McClung (1870-1946), Developed the "McClung Model" microscope and published a Handbook of Microscopic Technique. He was the first vice-president of the academy in 1924.
- Assad Panah, PAS President (1998-2000) and National Association of Academies of Science President (2004, 2013–2015)
- George C. Schoffstall (1929 -1996), PAS President (1976-1978 and 1984–1986) and National Association of Academies of Science President (1981 and 1986). George was also a naval fighter pilot in the Korean War.
