= Pennsylvania Junior Academy of Science =

- Founded: 1934
- State director: Robert Helm (since 2020)
- State secretary: William Welde
- State treasurer: Leah Ann Williams
- Motto: Discover, Explore, Learn

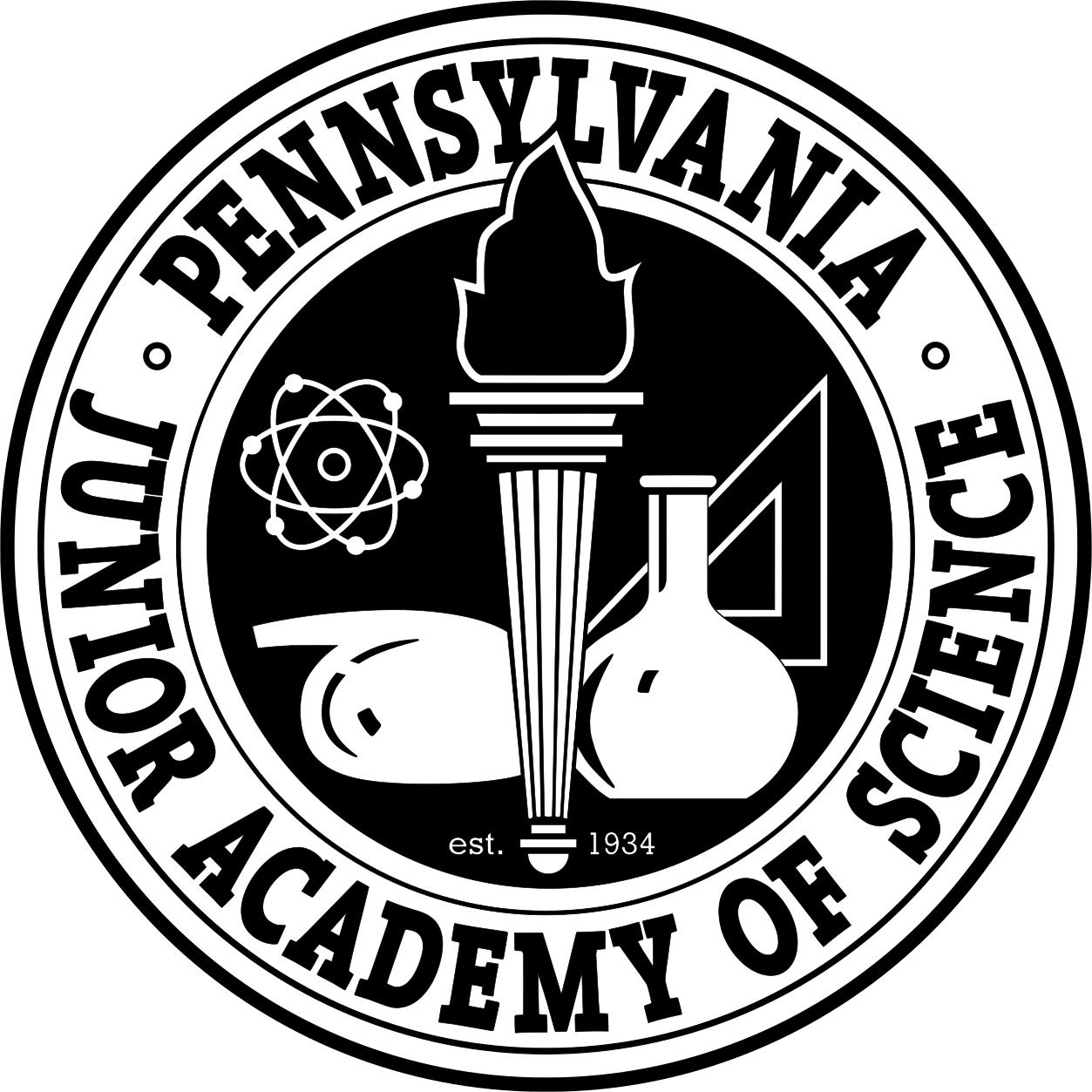
The PJAS logo adopted in 2018

Pennsylvania Junior Academy of Science (PJAS) is a statewide nonprofit organization in Pennsylvania founded in 1934 by the Pennsylvania Academy of Science as an affiliate of the American Association for the Advancement of Science (AAAS). Students in grades 7–12 conduct independent scientific research experiments following the scientific method before delivering a presentation detailing their results.

== Goals ==
PJAS is a statewide organization of junior and senior high school students designed to stimulate and promote interest in science among its members through the development of research projects and investigations.

The Pennsylvania Junior Academy of Science is organized with the following objectives:

- To promote greater participation in science and mathematics activities among the youth of Pennsylvania.
- To improve the quality of achievement in mathematics and science by encouraging students to participate in research and develop original ideas.
- To develop an understanding of the scientific community through close association with leaders in the sciences.
- To seek the improvement of science clubs activities through the cooperative regional and state meetings.
- To inculcate among its members true scientific attitudes and humanistic ideals that shall lead to the greater development of service to man.

== History ==
The American Association for the Advancement of Science (AAAS) appointed a national executive committee in the early 1930s to coordinate the activities of the various state Junior Academies of Science. A paper was presented at the Pennsylvania Academy of Science (PAS) meeting in 1932 that appointed a committee to consider developing of a junior academy in Pennsylvania; the senior PAS became the parent organization of PJAS.

On March 31, 1934, in Reading, Pennsylvania, delegates from 14 high school science clubs across Pennsylvania approved a constitution for the organization to officially form the Pennsylvania Junior Academy of Science. Otis W. Caldwell from Columbia University served as an official delegate of AAAS and welcomed the new group as Pennsylvania joined Indiana, Texas, Alabama, Arkansas, and others that already established junior academies of science. Karl F. Oerlein of the California State Teachers College served as the first state director of PJAS until 1941.

The following have served as PJAS state directors: Karl F. Oerlein 1934–1941, Mary Hawthorne 1941–1944, Marie K. Overholts 1944–1945, Sophie Moiles 1945–1958, Charles L. Bikle 1958–1964, Robert E. Hansen 1964–1967, Carolyn A. Gibson 1967–1971, Sister M. Gabrielle 1971–1976, Joseph A. Gennaula 1976–1979, Clarence Myers 1979–1985, Edward Testa 1985–1989, Joseph Durkin 1989–1996, James W. Maloy 1996–2002, Peter Carando 2002–2008, Laura Fisanick 2008–2014, Fay Hadaway-Nelson 2014–2020, and Robert Helm since 2020.

PJAS continued to grow thanks to the dedication of many adult sponsors, students, and alumni. State meetings were held at various resorts and convention centers throughout Pennsylvania until 1990, with the last state meeting held at the Seven Springs Resort. PJAS's continued growth caused the organization to move its state meetings to Pennsylvania State University at University Park, where it has occurred since 1991.

More than 5,000 students across 600 schools participated in PJAS (compared to 14 schools in 1934) with more than 3,000 students presenting their scientific research at the 2020 state meeting.

The 2020 state meeting was cancelled due to the COVID-19 pandemic. The 2021 state meeting was held in a virtual format due to the lasting effects of the pandemic, requiring students to pre-record their presentations.

PJAS participated as a sponsor/donor to the National Association of Academies of Science and the American Junior Academy of Sciences (AJAS) 2022 Conference.

== Projects ==
PJAS projects fall under four main groups: science, mathematics, computer science, and engineering. Each of these categories uses its own individualized rubric.

=== Science projects ===
Consists of projects in the following categories:

- Behavioral psychology (BEH) – The systematic investigation of mental phenomena of human and other animals, especially those associated with consciousness, behavior and the problems of adjustment to the environment.
- Biology (BIO) – This category is for the life science projects which do not fall into any other category. This includes, but is not limited to, projects involving human medicine and dentistry.
- Biochemistry (BC) – The study of chemistry within living organisms with emphasis of the process.
- Botany (BOT) – The study of plants.
- Chemistry (CHM) – The study of the composition of matter and how matter can change.
- Earth and space (ES) – The study of the earth and extraterrestrial bodies and the processes affecting them. This includes, but is not limited to, projects involving geology, oceanography, meteorology and astronomy.
- Ecology (ECO) – The study of the interactions and relationships of living things to their abiotic environment and to each other. This includes, but is not limited to, projects involving pollution, environmental alterations, and ecosystem analysis.
- Microbiology (MIC) – The study of microorganisms, which are defined as any microscopic organism that comprises either a single cell (unicellular) or cell cluster. This includes eukaryotes such as fungi and protists, and bacteria and prokaryotes.
- Physics (PHY) – The study of matter and motion. This includes, but is not limited to, projects involving the traditional subsets of physics (e.g., statics, dynamics, optics, acoustics, heat and electricity) and applied physics (e.g., mechanical, electrical, and civil engineering).
- Zoology (ZOO) – The study of animals. This includes, but is not limited to, projects involving animal physiology, animal anatomy, animal pathology, and animal genetics.

=== Mathematics projects ===
Consists of projects heavily focused on mathematics, or projects proving mathematical theorems.

=== Computer science projects ===
Consists of projects that test computer programs, algorithms, computer languages, and hardware.

=== Engineering projects ===
Consists of projects aimed to solve practical problems, focused in electrical, civil, and mechanical engineering. Can also include projects dealing with energy engineering, nanoengineering, and data engineering.

The engineering category was first introduced in the 2015 PJAS season.

== Regional meetings ==
Each of the 12 PJAS regions hold a private science competition between January and March of each year where students present their research to a panel of judges. The students are scored against a rubric, not judged against each other.

Some regions host an awards ceremony or other events to celebrate and announce the results for every student participant. Students receive a certificate and a bar with the color of their award (see § Pin and bars). Some regions may receive donations or funding to offer special awards for students.

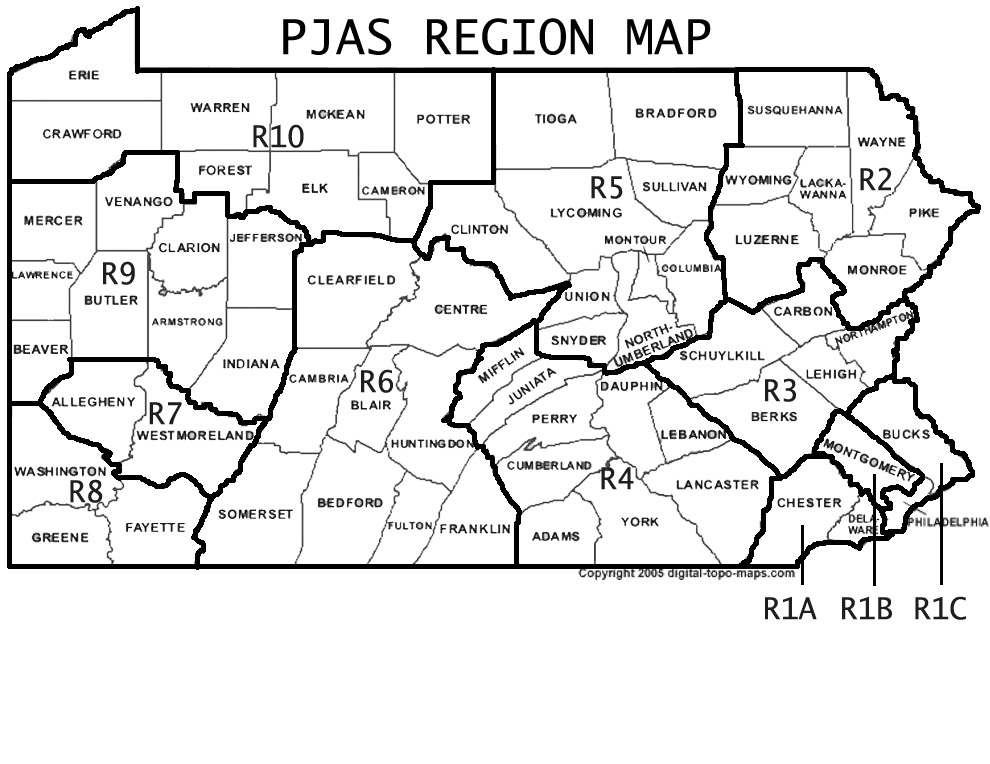
Map of the 12 regions of Pennsylvania Junior Academy of Science.

== State meeting ==
The PJAS state meeting is a multi-day event occurring from a Sunday to Tuesday in mid-May at Pennsylvania State University's University Park campus. Students who earned a 1st award at their regional meeting are invited to present their research again where additional monetary awards and scholarships can be earned. Students stay in university dorms and eat in the dining halls.

== Pin and bars ==
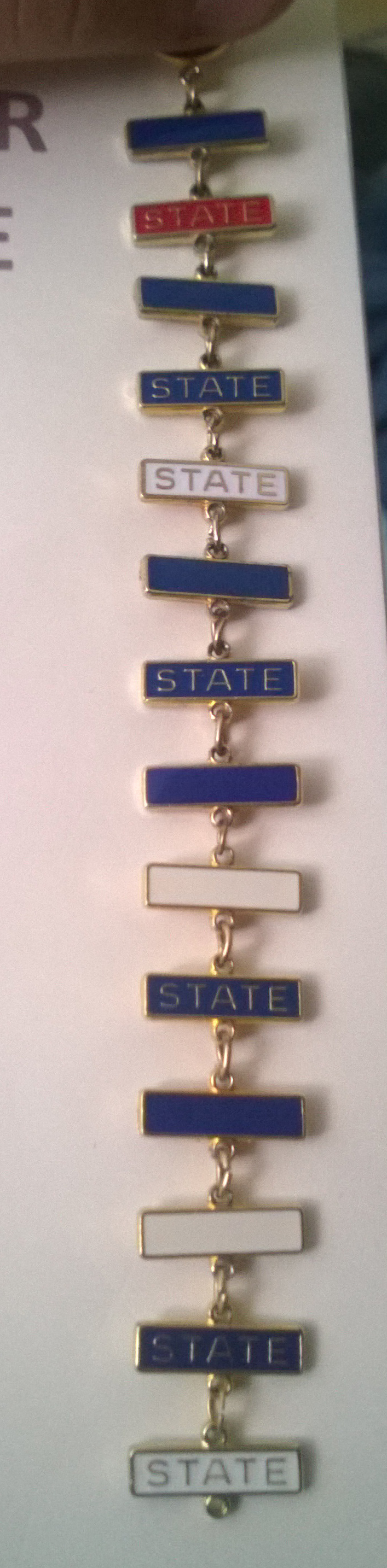
An example PJAS Pin and Bars from a senior in 2014

The PJAS pin and bars are unique to the organization. With the exception of honorable mention awards, students earn a small bar that is colored to reflect their performance. Students can earn bars at each regional and state meeting at which they present their project. The bars can be connected together to form a chain showcasing the student's history in the organization. The bar attached to the pin is the oldest project and the newest project is at the bottom. In the past, students earning a first award perfect score earn two bars – one bar for their first award, and a second bar noting the perfect score (as shown in the image) – but this is not done anymore. The bars also note which meeting the award was earned: bars earned at the state meeting have "STATE", while those earned at a regional meeting contain no text.

Award	Color	Rubric score (out of 5.00)
Perfect score	White	5.00
1st 1ward	Blue	4.00 to 4.99
2nd award	Red	3.00 to 3.99
3rd award	Yellow	2.00 to 2.99
Honorable mention	No bar	1.00 to 1.99

== Scoring rubric ==
PJAS judges presentations individually against a rubric instead of comparing projects like a normal science fair. Rubrics vary between the four major project types, but they contain similar elements:

- There are five categories, each with a maximum score of 5.00 points.
- Each judge's individual scores are combined and averaged to produce a final score out of 5.00.
- Every student is judged for their presentation quality and the judge's opinion of the presentation.

Between 1 and 5 points are awarded for each rubric category based on the student's fulfillment of the criteria.

=== Science ===
- Scientific thought
- Experimental methods
- Analytical approach (not the same as engineering)
- Presentation
- Judge's opinion

=== Math ===
- Fulfillment of purpose (not the same as computer science)
- Content
- Development
- Presentation
- Judge's opinion

=== Computer science ===
- Statement of the problem
- Methods
- Fulfillment of purpose (not the same as math)
- Presentation
- Judge's opinion

=== Engineering ===
- Engineering approach
- Procedural plan
- Analytical approach (not the same as science)
- Presentation
- Judge's opinion
