= Enterocarpus =

Scientific classification
- Kingdom: Fungi
- Division: Ascomycota
- Class: Sordariomycetes
- Order: Microascales
- Family: Microascaceae
- Genus: Enterocarpus; Locq.-Lin.

Type species
- Enterocarpus uniporus Locq.-Lin.

Genus of fungi

Enterocarpus is a genus of fungi in the family Microascaceae.
