= Kernia =

Scientific classification
- Kingdom: Fungi
- Division: Ascomycota
- Class: Sordariomycetes
- Order: Microascales
- Family: Microascaceae
- Genus: Kernia; Nieuwl.

Type species
- Kernia nitida (Sacc.) Nieuwl.

Genus of fungi

Kernia is a genus of fungi in the family Microascaceae.

The genus name of Kernia is in honour of Frank Dunn Kern (1883–1973), who was an American plant pathologist and university administrator. He was a faculty member of Pennsylvania State University.

The genus was circumscribed by Julius Nieuwland in 1916.

== Known species ==
According to GBIF;

- Kernia bifurcotricha A.S.Saxena & Mukerji
- Kernia brachytricha (L.M.Ames) R.K.Benj.
- Kernia cauquensis Calviello
- Kernia columnaris (H.J.Swart) Woudenb. & Samson
- Kernia furcotricha Tandon & Bilgrami
- Kernia geniculotricha Seth
- Kernia hippocrepida Malloch & Cain
- Kernia irregularis Lodha
- Kernia nitida (Sacc.) Nieuwl.
- Kernia ovata (C.Booth) Malloch & Cain
- Kernia pachypleura Malloch & Cain
- Kernia peruviana Udagawa & Furuya
- Kernia retardata Udagawa & T.Muroi
- Kernia setadisperma Locq.-Lin.
