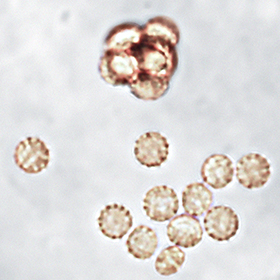
- Spores of Aphanoascus fulvescens

Scientific classification
- Kingdom: Fungi
- Division: Ascomycota
- Class: Eurotiomycetes
- Order: Onygenales
- Family: Onygenaceae
- Genus: Aphanoascus; Zukal (1890)

Type species
- Aphanoascus cinnabarinus Zukal (1890)

Synonyms
- Anixiopsis E.C.Hansen (1897); Keratinophyton H.S.Randhawa & R.S.Sandhu (1964); Neoxenophila Apinis & B.M.Clark (1974); Xynophila Malloch & Cain (1971)

= Aphanoascus =

Genus of fungi

Aphanoascus is a genus of fungi in the family Onygenaceae. It was circumscribed by Hugo Zukal in 1890.

== Species ==
- Aphanoascus aciculatus
- Aphanoascus australis
- Aphanoascus boninensis
- Aphanoascus canadensis
- Aphanoascus cinnabarinus
- Aphanoascus clathratus
- Aphanoascus cubensis
- Aphanoascus durus
- Aphanoascus foetidus
- Aphanoascus fulvescens
- Aphanoascus hispanicus
- Aphanoascus keratinophilus
- Aphanoascus mephitalis
- Aphanoascus multiporus
- Aphanoascus orissae
- Aphanoascus pinarensis
- Aphanoascus punsolae
- Aphanoascus reticulisporus
- Aphanoascus saturnoideus
- Aphanoascus terreus
- Aphanoascus verrucosus
