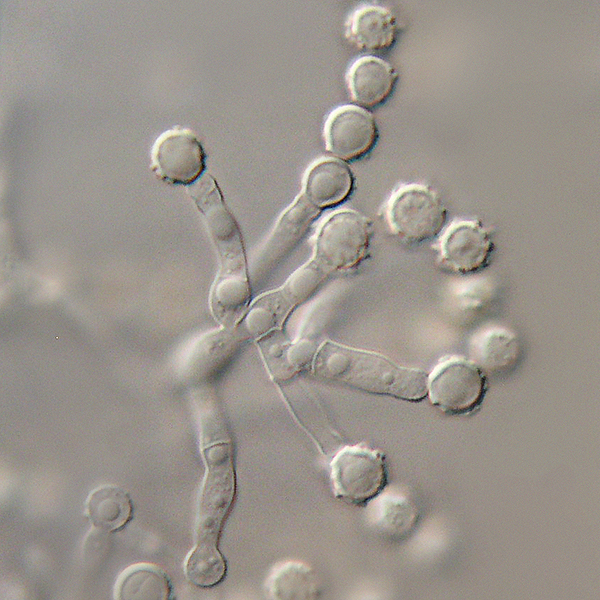

Scientific classification
- Kingdom: Fungi
- Division: Ascomycota
- Class: Sordariomycetes
- Order: Microascales
- Family: Microascaceae
- Genus: Microascus
- Species: M. brevicaulis

Binomial name
- Microascus brevicaulis S.P. Abbott (1998)

Synonyms
- Penicillium brevicaule Sacc. (1886); Scopulariopsis brevicaulis (Sacc.) Bainier (1907)

= Microascus brevicaulis =

Species of fungus

Microascus brevicaulis is a microfungus in the Ascomycota. It is the teleomorph form of Scopulariopsis brevicaulis. Microascus brevicaulis occurs world-wide as a saprotroph in soil, a common agent of biodeterioration, an irregular plant pathogen, and an occasional agent of human nail infection.

== Name ==
Most of the discussion of this fungus in the scientific and medical literature has referred to the fungus using the name of its asexual form, or anamorph, Scopulariopsis brevicaulis. However, a sexual form (teleomorph) named Microascus brevicaulis was recently described. Under the current revision of International Code of Nomenclature for Algae, Fungi, and Plants, as articulated in the Shenzhen Code 2018, it remains unclear which name this fungus will ultimately take. Until further clarification, Microascus brevicaulis is considered the most recent, accepted name.

Bartolomeo Gosio discovered in 1890 that under wet conditions M. brevicaulis produces significant amounts of trimethylarsine via biomethylation of inorganic pigments especially Paris green or Scheele's Green used in indoor wallpapers which is then released into the air.

== Morphology ==
Microascus brevicaulis is a common mold. When cultured at a temperature of 25 °C on potato dextrose agar it forms white colonies which become powdery and/or granular as they mature. Under such conditions the fungus can grow rapidly, expanding as much as 4.5 - 5.5 cm within one week. The hyphae of M. brevicaulis are hyaline (transparent) and septate (separated into segments by cross-walls). The anamorph has conidia that are flattened on the base and tapered at the apex, resembling a boat keel in cross-section or a pontifical mitre. The conidia are produced in chains from cells known as annelides, phialide-like cells that elongate with each successive conidium produced. These, in turn, range from solitary to arranged in complex broom-like clusters on fertile hyphae known as conidiophores. The fungus is a typical perithecial member of Phylum Ascomycota, producing minute, enclosed fruiting bodies containing sexual spores (ascospores) in sacs known as asci. The ascospores of M. brevicaulis are kidney-shaped and reddish-brown in colour.

== Ecology ==
This fungus usually occurs as a mold present in numerous different types of soil as well as various decaying types of organic matter. Microascus brevicaulis has a world-wide distribution, and occurs chiefly as a soil saprotroph. The species is also encountered with some frequency as a non-dermatophyte agent of nail infections (onychomycosis), particularly in toenails. Besides the typical soil life of a decomposer, this fungus is also known to live within the American dog tick, Dermacentor variabilis. This relationship seems to be highly adapted but not as a classic host-parasite interaction. Studies have shown M. brevicaulis inhabits its host as an endosymbiont, and may provides protection against the insect-pathogenic fungus, Metarhizium anisopliae.

== Pathogenicity in humans ==
Microascus brevicaulis has typically been associated with infections located on the skin surface of patients. Though this fungus is responsible for causing several skin related diseases, it is not considered a habitual pathogen. It is however categorized as a dermatomycotic mold which is known to cause Onychomycosis. This is the most prevalent disease affecting human nails but M. brevicaulis has been isolated from healthy nails as well as diseased ones, indicating that it could be a harmless contaminant in some situations but behave as an opportunistic pathogen in others.

Microascus brevicaulis is also known to cause granulomatous skin infections in humans. Yet another dermatological disease which may be caused by M. brevicaulis is skin infection on the sole of the foot. These infections appear as red bumps or (less commonly ridges) around the patients hands and feet. Usually, these infections cause no pain and do not last very long thus resolve without treatment. In some cases however, these types of infection may be persistent and cause great discomfort.

Yet another dermatological disease which may be caused by M. brevicaulis is plantar infection. This consists of a (potentially thick) scaly plaque that accumulates on the feet. Despite the discomfort and pain which dermatological infections of this sort inflict upon patients, M. brevicaulis is considerably more dangerous (even fatal) in situations where it manages to bypass the skin and reach deep tissues. The danger arises because M. brevicaulis is a multi-drug resistant, opportunistic pathogen. In the past, these kinds of infections mostly occurred if an individual punctured their skin with a stick or experienced some similar form of trauma that could implant M. brevicaulis below the skin. However, in recent years there has been an increase in the previously rare number of cases of deep tissue infections resulting from M. brevicaulis. In contemporary cases where deep tissue invasion has occurred, the patients are almost always immunocompromised. It is believed that the increasing incidence of diseases like AIDS and diabetes coupled with medical practices like chemo-therapy and broad-spectrum antibiotic treatments are primarily responsible for creating a large number of individuals who are predisposed to potentially fatal infections of M. brevicaulis.

Another more recent entry route for this fungus has been an increase in the number of elective surgeries which raise its exposure to internal environments. The occurrence of such infections is on the rise and includes several life-threatening conditions such as: the formation of fungus balls in preformed pulmonary cavities, keratitis, posttraumatic endophthalmitis, disseminated skin lesions in AIDS patients, granulomatous subcutaneous infections, invasive hyalohyphomycosis, pneumonia in leukemic patients, endocarditis related to valvuloplasty or prosthetic valves, and fatal disseminated infection after bone marrow transplantation. In other cases, M. brevicaulis has caused death in immunocompromised patients with hematological diseases.
