= Graphium (fungus) =

Scientific classification
- Kingdom: Fungi
- Division: Ascomycota
- Class: Sordariomycetes
- Order: Microascales
- Family: Microascaceae
- Genus: Graphium; Corda (1837)

Type species
- Graphium penicillioides Corda (1837)

Synonyms
- Ceratopodium Corda (1837)

Genus of fungi

Graphium is a genus of fungi in the family Microascaceae. Historically, Graphium was used for hyphomycetes with erect, black synnemata (i.e. bundles of spore-producing conidiophores) bearing a single, terminal, ball of one-celled, hyaline conidia produced from annellides. More than 100 species were described following that general concept before the diversity of sexual states and DNA phylogenies led to reclassification of most species. The approximately 20 species remaining in the modern genus are assumed to be minor plant pathogens on trees. Most species reported in soil, plant debris, woody substrates, manure, and polluted water are now classified in other genera such as Parascedosporium or Ophiostoma.

Species (most now classified in other genera):

- Graphium adansoniae Cruyw., Z.W.de Beer & Jol.Roux
- Graphium adustum Grosmann
- Graphium ailanthi (Ranoj. & Bubák) Sacc.
- Graphium albiziae (Pat.) Pat.
- Graphium albonigrescens Lindau
- Graphium album (Corda) Sacc.
- Graphium altissimum Strasser
- Graphium ambrosiigerum Hedgc.
- Graphium angamosense Matsush.
- Graphium aphthosae Alstrup & D.Hawksw.
- Graphium atrovirens Hedgc.
- Graphium basitruncatum (Matsush.) Seifert & G.Okada
- Graphium bolivarii Riofrio
- Graphium bulbicola Henn.
- Graphium caliciiforme Maire
- Graphium carbonarium Paciura, Z.W.de Beer, X.D.Zhou & M.J.Wingf.
- Graphium cicadicola Speg.
- Graphium clavula (Berk. & Broome) Sacc.
- Graphium coffeae Zimm.
- Graphium comatrichoides Massee & E.S.Salmon
- Graphium coralloides (Berk. & M.A.Curtis) Höhn.
- Graphium cylindricum Petch
- Graphium dubautiae F.Stevens & Weedon
- Graphium dulcamarae (Sacc.) Lindau
- Graphium euwallaceae Twizeyim., S.C.Lynch & Eskalen
- Graphium fabiforme Cruyw. & Z.W.de Beer
- Graphium filfilense Sacc.
- Graphium fissum Preuss
- Graphium flexuosum (Massee) Sacc.
- Graphium fructicola Marchal & É.J.Marchal
- Graphium geranii Voglino
- Graphium guttuliferum Pidopl.
- Graphium hamamelidis J.M.Hook
- Graphium hendersonulae Chevaug.
- Graphium indicum Chouhan & Panwar
- Graphium irradians Petr.
- Graphium jumulu P.A.Barber & Crous
- Graphium klebahnii Oudem.
- Graphium kuroshium F.Na, J.D.Carrillo & Eskalen
- Graphium laricis K.Jacobs, Kirisits & M.J.Wingf.
- Graphium ligulariae Săvul. & Sandu
- Graphium madagascariense Cruyw. & Z.W.de Beer
- Graphium malorum Kidd & Beaumont
- Graphium melanotes (Syd. & P.Syd.) Sacc.
- Graphium minutellum Pidopl.
- Graphium pallescens (Fuckel) Magnus
- Graphium paspali Cif. & Vegni
- Graphium penicillioides Corda
- Graphium perpusillum Sacc. & Traverso
- Graphium pseudormiticum M.Mouton & M.J.Wingf.
- Graphium pycnocephalum Grosmann
- Graphium pyrinum Goid.
- Graphium rigidum (Pers.) Sacc.
- Graphium rubrum Rumbold
- Graphium samogiticum Motiej. & Alstrup
- Graphium scolytodis M.Kolařík & J.Hulcr
- Graphium silanum Goid.
- Graphium simplex K.Jacobs & M.J.Wingf.
- Graphium sordidiceps Fairm.
- Graphium terricola Manohar., P.Rag.Rao, Rehana & P.Rama Rao
- Graphium trifolii Jaap
- Graphium variabile J.J.Xu & T.Y.Zhang
- Graphium volkartianum Magnus
- Graphium wuweiense J.H.Kong & T.Y.Zhang
- Graphium xanthocephalum (Ditmar) Sacc.
