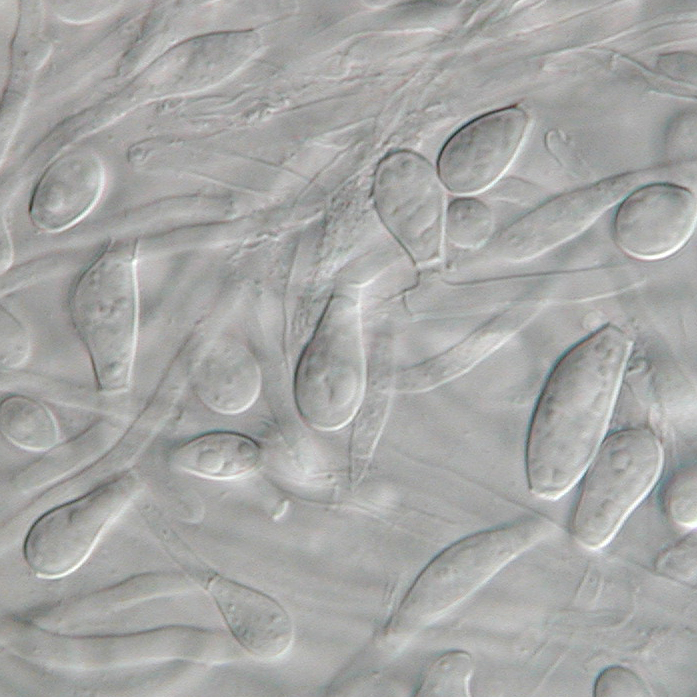

Scientific classification
- Kingdom: Fungi
- Division: Ascomycota
- Class: Eurotiomycetes
- Order: Onygenales
- Family: Onygenaceae
- Genus: Chrysosporium
- Species: C. keratinophilum

Binomial name
- Chrysosporium keratinophilum D. Frey ex J.W. Carmich.

Synonyms
- Aphanoascus keratinophilus

= Chrysosporium keratinophilum =

Species of fungus

Chrysosporium keratinophilum is a mold that is closely related to the dermatophytic fungi (family Arthrodermataceae) and is mainly found in soil and the coats of wild animals to break down keratin. Chrysosporium keratinophilum is one of the more commonly occurring species of the genus Chrysosporium in nature. It is easily detected due to its characteristic "light-bulb" shape and flat base. Chrysosporium keratinophilum is most commonly found in keratin-rich, dead materials such as feathers, skin scales, hair, and hooves. Although not identified as pathogenic, it is a regular contaminant of cutaneous specimens which leads to the common misinterpretation that this fungus is pathogenic.

== Description ==
Chrysosporium keratinophilum colonies grow rapidly at 25 °C approximately 60–100 mm in 21 days. Colonies can be flat or folded, dry, powdery, or velvety with a white- or cream-coloured center The colony surface is dotted with droplets of clear or brown exuded liquid. The hyphae are septate and the conidia are hyaline, broad-based and one-celled. The conidia are large, smooth to slightly rough-walled, sometimes slightly curved and occasionally septate. The conidia are broadly "light-bulb" shaped with an abruptly flattened smooth base. Colonies grow to about 30 mm in diameter in one week and are flat with a powdery to suede-like texture. The colony reverse is also cream-coloured. Chrysosporium keratinophilum produces abundant aleurioconidia that resemble the microconidia of dermatophytes; however, the conidia of C. keratinophilum are considerably larger. Chrysosporium keratinophilum has been associated with two closely related sexual states: Aphanoascus keratinophilus and Aphanoascus fulvescens.

== Habitat and distribution ==
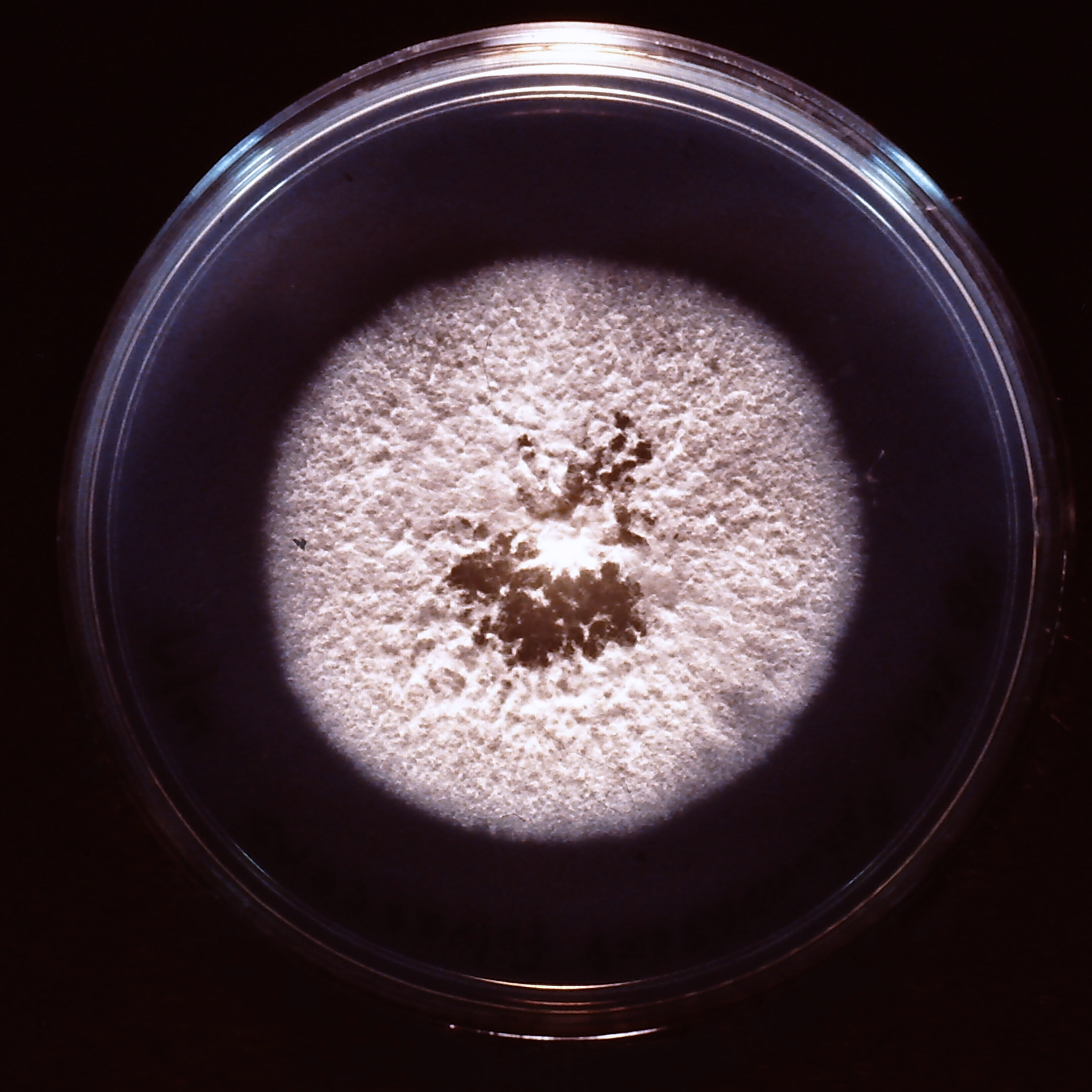
A. fulvescens colony.

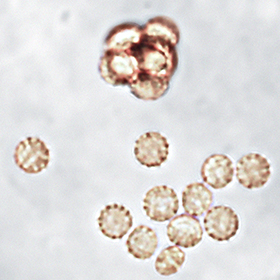
A. fulvescens ascus (above) and ascospores (below).

Chrysosporium keratinophilum is often referred to as a keratinophilic fungus in reference to its affinity for growth on keratin-rich non-living materials such as skin scales and hairs separated from the host. Chrysosporium keratinophilum produces a keratin-degrading enzyme that functions at 90 °C. Its process of digestion occurs in two stages, requiring keratin to be chemically altered to a structureless form before it is digested. The method of hair digestion is carried out with perforating bodies. Chrysosporium spp. are asexual states of fungi in the genera Aphanoascus, Nannizziopsis, and Uncinocarpus.

The fungus commonly grows on feathers, hooves, hair and other dead matter. It is rarely found on human skin and more commonly found in soil in temperate areas, plant material, dung and on birds. A study on keratinophylic fungi in the water sediments of India, by Katiyar and Kushwaha, found C. keratinophilum in sediments of catch basins and sewage sludge in India and Poland. Chrysosporium keratinophilum is associated to mud sludge structure, high humidity, volatile solids, low carbon nitrogen ratios and tolerance to heavy metals. Together, these give C. keratinophilum a high long-term survival probability in superficial water which may present an exposure risk, especially to people in India who bathe in these waters. Apart from inhabiting water sediments, a study in Egypt identified and isolated the teleomorph of C. keratinophilium, Aphanoascus fulvescens, in half of samples gathered from floor dusts in university student housing, demonstrating its regularity in indoor environments. Similarly, Bahkali and Parvez found C. keratinophilum to be widespread mold in house dust from homes in Saudi Arabia. In a study of 29 sandpits from kindergarten schools and public parks in the West Bank of Jordan, Shtayeh found that over half of the fungal isolates from these materials contained fungi known to cause disease. Amongst the non-pathogenic fungi found, Chrysosporium keratinophilum was the most common dermatophyte relative.

A study looking at species diversity of keratin-degrading fungi in different soil types by Bohacz and Korniłłowicz-Kowalska, determined the most frequently isolated species was C. keratinophilum. Together with its teleomorph, Aphanoascus fulvescens, it constituted nearly half of all isolations. The frequency of this fungus was positively correlated with the content of humus, nitrogen, CaCO_{3} and phosphorus in the soils, and the fungus demonstrated high tolerance for pH (e.g., from pH 4.5–9.5). Chrysosporium keratinophilum accounted for nearly two thirds of isolations of keratinophilic fungi from phaeozem (the upper-layer, humus-rich soil horizon) and over half of keratinophilic fungi from cambisol. Increased populations of C. keratinophilum were found at higher pH.

== Isolation ==
Generally, the hair-bait technique has been used to selectively isolate keratinophilic fungi from soil. However, because of the poor keratinolytic activity of Chrysosporium spp., some of these fungi are not adequately isolated from soils by using this conventional technique. Therefore, by utilizing the higher temperature tolerance of some Chrysosporium spp, a selective technique to isolate C. keratinophilum, C. indicum, and C. tropicum has been developed. By implementing a pre-incubation treatment of keratin baited soil samples at 38 °C, the fast-growing, competitive and thermosensitive strains are eliminated, thereby reducing the competition and allowing C. keratinophilum and other thermotolerant species to continue to grow.

== Antagonistic activity ==
In a study by Singh an co-workers, eighteen fungi were isolated from soil and tested for their antagonistic interactions. The maximum inhibition of Microsporum equinum, M. fulvum, M. gypseum and M. racemosum was caused by multiple fungi, including C. keratinophilum. On the other hand, staling products of C. lucknowense accelerated the growth of many fungi, including C. keratinophilum. Another study tested C. keratinophilum for its anti-dermatophyte activity against Trichophyton mentagrophytes and Epidermophyton flocossum. In their study, C. keratinophilum inhibited T. rubrum, T. tonsurans and T. mentagrophytes, but not M. gypseum and Microsporum nanum.

== Pathogenicity ==
Members of the genus Chrysosporium have weak pathogenic potential, with human and animal infection reported for only a few taxa. Experimental studies have shown inoculation of this fungus on guinea pig skin to produce erythematous scaling lesions which disappear after 3–5 weeks; however, no apparent invasion of the hair shaft occurs. In white mice, after inoculation, granulomas with necrotic centers can be observed, although conidia of the fungus appear to remain intact. Chrysosporium keratinophilum is one of several soil organisms that is occasionally isolated from skin and nails. Isolation of this species from clinical specimens is generally from human onychomycoses, the mycotic superficial invasion of keratinized tissue of the nail plate. In practice, C. keratinophilum is interpreted to be an infrequent contaminant of keratinaceous clinical specimens, such as hair, skin and nails, with no clinical significance. A pathogenic role for C. keratinophilum is unlikely; however, its ability to remain viable for weeks on skin may suggest pathogenic potential. However, a critical component in limiting its pathogenic potential is its inability to grow at 37 °C, which is the human body temperature discouraging the possibility for this fungi to be infectious to humans. The first report of onychomycosis caused by C. keratinophilum in animals was reported by Pin and his colleagues. The seven Bennett's wallabies (Macropus rufogriseus rufogriseus) they observed had swollen, abnormal claws from which Chrysosporium keratinophilum was repeatedly identified in culture, suggesting that the fungus may factor in disease. In another experimental study, C. keratinophilum showed pathogenic potential in the white mouse, remaining viable in the peritoneal cavity for up to two months. It is possible that C. keratinophilum can cause more generalized infections in a weakened mammalian host.

== Biotechnological applications ==
=== Leather tanning ===
Chrysosporium keratinophilum produces a thermostable, keratinolytic alkaline protease when grown in medium containing keratin. When grown in a medium that lacked keratin, it had no enzymatic function indicating the inducibility of the enzyme. The keratinolytic protease had maximum activity at pH 9.0 and a temperature maximum of 90 °C, whereas many other fungi, such as T. mentagraphytes, Microsporum gypseum, T. rubrum, had maximum activity below pH 9.0. Alkaline proteolytic keratinases are important for leather tanning as a ready means of removing hair from hides.

=== Bioremediation ===
Waste removal from slaughterhouses is sometimes ploughed into nearby fields becoming a potential health risk since controlled keratin decomposition by anaerobic bacteria produces large quantities of hydrogen sulfide and ammonia. Current studies are demonstrating the usefulness of the proteases produced by C. keratinophilum in bioremediation of this keratinic waste.

=== Caffeine degradation ===
In another study comparing caffeine degradation by four different fungi, Nayak and her colleagues found that C, keratinophilum produces the highest rate of caffeine degradation both in the presence and absence of a nitrogen source. This finding suggests that C. keratinophilum may have commercial use for the decaffeination of coffee pulp, and in the process, it could provide nutrient supplement for animal feed or improved substrates for bioethanol production.
