= Synnema =

A synnema (plural synnemata, also coremia; derivation: "Threads together") is a large, erect reproductive structure borne by some fungi, bearing compact conidiophores, which fuse together to form a strand resembling a stalk of wheat, with conidia at the end or on the edges. Fungal genera which bear synnemata include Doratomyces.
