= Hugo Zukal =

Austrian lichenologist (1845–1900)

- Born: 1845; Opava
- Died: 1900 (aged 54–55); Vienna
- Scientific career
- Fields: Mycology, lichenology
- Institutions: University of Natural Resources and Life Sciences, Vienna
- Author abbrev. (botany): Zukal

Hugo Zukal (1845–1900) was an Austrian lichenologist and mycologist. Born in Troppau (now Opava in the Czech Republic), he graduated from high school there in 1859, and was afterwards employed as a botanist until 1864. From 1864 until 1872, he served in the Kaiserlich-Königlich army. After this, he attended the teacher training college in Trautenau (now Trutnov), and became a teacher in Freudental and Vienna. He has been credited for having introduced the term pallisade hyphae in an 1895 publication to refer to a microscopic arrangement of fungal tissue characteristic of the cortex in the lichen genus Roccella. In 1898 he became a professor of phytopathology at the University of Natural Resources and Life Sciences, Vienna. He died in Vienna in 1900.

Several taxa have been named to honour Zukal. These include the genera Zukalia Sacc. (1891), Zukalina Kuntze (1891), and the species Ascophanus zukalii Rehm (1896), Cryptocoryne zukalii Rataj (1974), Gloeopeziza zukalii Rehm (1896), Humaria zukalii Rehm (1888), Leucoloma zukalii Rehm (1886), Penicillium zukalii Biourge (1923), and Thelebolus zukalii Heimerl (1889).

== Selected publications ==
- Zukal, Hugo (1883). "Eine neue Flechte: Ephebe kerneri". Österreichische botanische Zeitschrift (in German). 33 (7): 209–210. Bibcode:1883PSyEv..33..209Z. doi:10.1007/BF01638356.
- Zukal, H. (1891). "Eine neue, niedrig organisierte Flechte, Epigloea bactrospora". Botanisches Centralblatt (in German). 41: 83.
- Zukal, H. (1896). "Morphologische und biologische Untersuchungen über die Flechten. II". Sitzungsberichte der Kaiserlichen Akademie der Wissenschaften. Mathematisch-Naturwissenschaftliche Classe Klasse. 105: 1303–1395.
- Zukal, H. (1896). "Morphologische und biologische Untersuchungen über die Flechten. III". Sitzungsberichte der Kaiserlichen Akademie der Wissenschaften. Mathematisch-Naturwissenschaftliche Classe Klasse. 105.

== See also ==
- Category:Taxa named by Hugo Zukal
