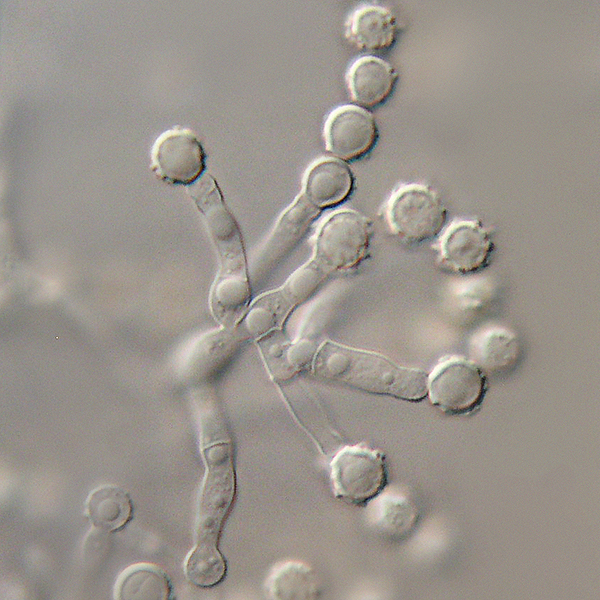
- Scopulariopsis brevicaulis

Scientific classification
- Kingdom: Fungi
- Division: Ascomycota
- Class: Sordariomycetes
- Order: Microascales
- Family: Microascaceae; Luttr. ex Malloch (1970)

Type genus
- Microascus Zukal (1886)

= Microascaceae =

Family of fungi

The Microascaceae are a family of fungi in the class Sordariomycetes, subclass Hypocreomycetidae. The family was published by David Malloch in 1970, an emended description based on Everet Stanley Luttrell's original 1951 publication, and reassessed in 2020.

== Description ==
Microascaceae species have spherical to irregularly shaped, darkly colored fruit bodies. They are usually hairy and rarely smooth. The smooth spores are reddish brown to copper colored, one-celled, and have a germ pore at one or both ends. Asci can occur singly or in chains.

== Genera ==
As accepted by Wijayawardene et al. 2020 (with number of species);

- Acaulium Sopp (4)
- Brachyconidiellopsis Decock, R.F. Castañeda & Adhikari (1)
- Canariomyces Arx (3)
- Cephalotrichum Link (37) - anamorph
- Doratomyces Corda (3)
- Echinobotryum Corda (2)
- Enterocarpus Locq.-Lin. (2)
- Fairmania Sacc. (1)
- Gamsia M. Morelet (5)
- Kernia Nieuwl. (14)
- Lomentospora Hennebert & B.G. Desai (1)
- Lophotrichus R.K. Benj. (8)
- Microascus Zukal (60)
- Parascedosporium Gilgado, Gené, Cano & Guarro (2)
- Petriella Curzi (8)
- Pseudallescheria Negroni & I. Fisch. (8)
- Pseudoscopulariopsis Sand.-Den., Gené & Guarro (2)
- Rhinocladium Sacc. & Marchal (11)
- Scedosporium Sacc. ex Castell. & Chalm. (12)
- Scopulariopsis Bainier (87) - anamorph
- Wardomyces F.T. Brooks & Hansf. (11)
- Wardomycopsis Udagawa & Furuya (5)
- Yunnania H.Z. Kong (3)
