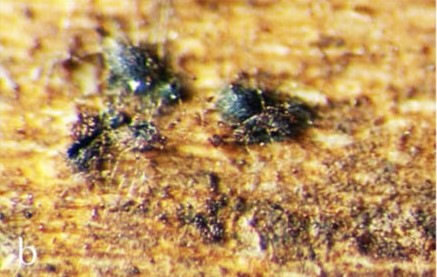
- On host

Scientific classification
- Kingdom: Fungi
- Division: Ascomycota
- Class: Sordariomycetes
- Order: Savoryellales
- Family: Savoryellaceae
- Genus: Savoryella
- Species: S. lignicola

Binomial name
- Savoryella lignicola E.B.G. Jones & R.A. Eaton (1969)

= Savoryella lignicola =

Species of fungus

Savoryella lignicola is a species of marine and freshwater based fungi in the Savoryellaceae family of the order Savoryellales. They are saprobic (processing of decayed (dead or waste) organic matter) on submerged wood.

== Taxonomy ==
The genus name of Savoryella is derived from John George Savory (1917-2003), who was a mycologist, born in Sacriston, Co Durham, England. In 1969, a completely new genus of fungi was discovered by researchers at Portsmouth Polytechnic to cause soft rot in the marine environment, its identifier, botanist Evan Benjamin Gareth Jones, gave the new genus of fungi, the name of Savoryella in tribute to Savory.

The Latin epithet "lignicola" means "living on wood".

Taxonomically, Savoryella had been referred to several orders (Jones et al. 2016). In 2011, Savoryella together with genus Ascotaiwania, Canalisporium (and its sexual morph Ascothailandia) formed a distinct clade in the Hypocreomycetidae subclass (within the Sordariomycetes class), based on phylogenetic analyses of the SSU and LSU rRNA, RPB2, and TEF-1-alpha genes (Boonyuen et al. 2011). It can also occur early in the colonization of timber test panels and also on well-decayed wood (Eaton & Jones 1971), and also causes active soft-rot decay of wood (Mouzouras 1986).

== History ==
Savoryella lignicola was initially described from test panels of Fagus sylvestris and Pinus sylvestris, exposed in a water cooling tower run with brackish water (Eaton & Jones 1971), at Connah's Quay in Wales.

It was later reported as a cosmopolitan species (Jones and Eaton, 1969; Ho et al., 1997; Jones et al., 2016). This is the sole Savoryella taxon detailed from both marine and freshwater environments (Ho et al., 1997; Luo et al., 2004). Though the marine and freshwater isolates of Savoryella lignicola are morphologically alike, it is doubtful whether they are same species (Ho et al., 1997). Molecular data are available only for two Savoryella lignicola strains described from mangrove wood from Malaysia and submerged Nypa fruticans fronds from Thailand, with no molecular data for the freshwater strain of Savoryella lignicola (Ho et al., 1997; Boonyuen et al., 2011,). Therefore, molecular data should be obtained from collections from freshwater habitats to establish whether they are the same species or not. Savoryella lignicola morphologically resembles Savoryella fusiformis and Savoryella longispora (Boonyuen et al., 2011). However, these taxa can easily be distinguished by measurements of length/width ratio of ascospores and molecular data (Ho et al., 1997; Boonyuen et al., 2011).

== Description ==
Savoryella lignicola has;

The sexual morph, ascomata (fruiting body) that is 170-350 μm (Micrometre) high, 120-250 μm in diameter. They are globose, subglobose or ellipsoidal (in shape). They are immersed, partly immersed or superficial, ostiolate (having an ostiole, a small hole or opening), papillate (covered with or bearing papillae or small hairs), membranous, and pale to dark brown.

They have long necks, (48-)80-165 μm long, up to 72 μm in diameter, brown, with periphyses (short, thread-like filaments that line the opening, or ostiole). The peridium (The outer wall of a sporangium or other fruiting body) is brown, one-layered and composed of several layers of thick-walled angular cells forming a textura angularis. The paraphyses (a sterile upward-growing, basally-attached hypha in a hymenium) is present, but sparse.

The asci ascus (the reproductive cell) is 100-(128)-180 × 16-24 μm. It is eight-spored, cylindrical or clavate (club-shaped) in shape. It is short-stalked, unitunicate (enclosed in a single tunic-like layer), persistent, with an apical truncate non-amyloid apical thickening containing a pore.

The ascospores (spores formed in the developing ascus) are 24-36 × 8-12 μm, uni-orbiseriate (arranged in two curved rows), ellipsoidal, tri-septate (having three septa/cell walls), not markedly constricted at the septa. The central cells are brown (10-6-16 μm) with apical cells smaller and hyaline (translucent) and (2.6-6 μm long).

The anamorph or asexual morph is undetermined (modified description of Maharachchikumbura et al., 2016,). Undetermined.

== Distribution ==
Savoryella lignicola has a cosmopolitan distribution, although they are mostly common in tropical and subtropical ecosystems. They are found in places such as; America (including Florida,) Andaman Islands, Australia, Brunei, Canada, China, England, Egypt, Hong Kong, India, Indonesia, Japan, Macau, Malaysia, Maldives, Mauritius, Mexico, New Zealand, Philippines, Portugal, Seychelles, Singapore, South Africa, Sri Lanka, Taiwan, Thailand, and Wales.

They are found in brackish water habitats, as well as marine water habitats. On submerged wood, within water cooling towers, and in rivers and streams. They also can be found in mangrove swamps, (on species of Rhizophora) in Asia including Malaysia.

== Uses ==
Five lignicolous mangrove fungi (Hypoxlon oceanicum, Julella avicenniae, Lignincola laevis, Trematosphaeria mangrovei and Savoryella lignicola) produced extracellular endoglucanase, cellobiohydrolase and β-glucosidase in lab conditions.
