= Trichocladium =

Scientific classification
- Kingdom: Fungi
- Division: Ascomycota
- Class: Sordariomycetes
- Order: Sordariales
- Family: Chaetomiaceae
- Genus: Trichocladium; Harz 1871

Genus of fungi

Trichocladium is a genus of fungi within the Chaetomiaceae family.

Trichocladium lignicola and other fungi genera (including Aniptodera salsuginosa) have been found in intertidal mangrove forests within Thailand.

== Species ==
As accepted by Species Fungorum;

- Trichocladium acropullum (X.Wei Wang) X. Wei Wang & Houbraken (2018)
- Trichocladium amorphum X. Wei Wang & Houbraken (2018)
- Trichocladium angelicum A. Roldán & Honrubia (1989)
- Trichocladium antarcticum (Stchigel & Guarro) X. Wei Wang & Houbraken (2018)
- Trichocladium aquaticum N.S. Pawar & B.D. Borse (2019)
- Trichocladium arxii (Benny) X. Wei Wang & Houbraken (2018)
- Trichocladium asperum Harz (1871)
- Trichocladium beniowskiae X. Wei Wang & Houbraken (2018)
- Trichocladium brosimi C. Ram (1970)
- Trichocladium canadense S. Hughes (1959)
- Trichocladium crispatum (Fuckel) X. Wei Wang & Houbraken (2018)
- Trichocladium diversicoloratum Gamundí & Aramb. (1979)
- Trichocladium elegans R.F. Castañeda & G.R.W. Arnold (1985)
- Trichocladium englandense K.D. Hyde & Goh (1999)
- Trichocladium fuscum (Hallier) Sacc. & Traverso (1911)
- Trichocladium gilmaniellae X. Wei Wang & Houbraken (2018)
- Trichocladium griseum (Traaen) X. Wei Wang & Houbraken (2018)
- Trichocladium heterothallicum (Yu Zhang & L. Cai) X. Wei Wang & Houbraken (2018)
- Trichocladium indicum V.G. Rao, K.A. Reddy, D.R. Kumar & B.S. Reddy (1985)
- Trichocladium ismailiense Moustafa & Ezz-El-din (1990)
- Trichocladium jilongense (Y.M. Wu & T.Y. Zhang) X. Wei Wang & Houbraken (2018)
- Trichocladium lignicola I. Schmidt (1985)
- Trichocladium lobatum B. Sutton (1975)
- Trichocladium macrosporum P.M. Kirk (1981)
- Trichocladium melhae E.B.G. Jones, Abdel-Wahab & Vrijmoed (2001)
- Trichocladium nigrospermum (Schwein.) X. Wei Wang & Houbraken (2018)
- Trichocladium nipponicum K. Matsush. & Matsush. (1996)
- Trichocladium novae-zelandiae S. Hughes (1969)
- Trichocladium olivaceum Petch (1922)
- Trichocladium palmae Manohar., N.K. Rao, Kunwar & D.K. Agarwal (2006)
- Trichocladium pyriforme M. Dixon (1968)
- Trichocladium seminis-citrulli (Sergeeva) X. Wei Wang & Houbraken (2018)
- Trichocladium sigmoidea Manohar., N.K. Rao, Kunwar & D.K. Agarwal (2006)
- Trichocladium singaporense Tubaki, T.K. Tan & Y. Ogawa (1993)
- Trichocladium taiwanense Matsush. (1983)
- Trichocladium uniseptatum (Yu Zhang & L. Cai) X. Wei Wang & Houbraken (2018)
- Trichocladium variosporum Zachariah, Sankaran & M.U. Rahman (1981)

Former species;

- T. achrasporum (Meyers & R.T. Moore) M. Dixon (1968) = Halosphaeriopsis mediosetigera, Halosphaeriaceae
- T. achrasporum (Meyers & R.T. Moore) M. Dixon ex Shearer & J.L. Crane (1971) = Halosphaeriopsis mediosetigera, Halosphaeriaceae
- T. alopallonellum (Meyers & R.T. Moore) Kohlm. & Volkm.-Kohlm. (1995) = Humicola alopallonella, Chaetomiaceae
- T. asperum var. charticola Sacc. (1886) = Trichocladium asperum
- T. basicola (Berk. & Broome) J.W. Carmich. (1980) = Berkeleyomyces basicola, Ceratocystidaceae
- T. charticola (Sacc.) Mussat (1901) = Trichocladium asperum
- T. constrictum I. Schmidt (1985) = Cucurbitinus constrictus, Halosphaeriaceae
- T. cubense R.F. Castañeda & G.R.W. Arnold (1985) = Kaseifertia cubensis, Savoryellaceae
- T. cylindroclavatum Matsush. (1975) = Henicospora cylindroclavata, Ascomycota
- T. deosporum Bat. & H.P. Upadhyay (1965) = Torula deospora, Torulaceae
- T. linderi J.L. Crane & Shearer (1978) = Bactrodesmium linderi, Dothideomycetes
- T. medullare Kohlm. & Volkm.-Kohlm. (1995) = Kohlmeyeriopsis medullaris, Magnaporthaceae
- T. minimum de Hoog & Grinb. (1975) = Leohumicola minima, Helotiales
- T. moenitum J.L. Crane & Shearer (1978) = Bactrodesmium moenitum, Dothideomycetes
- T. nypae K.D. Hyde & Goh (1999) = Savoryella nypae, Savoryellaceae
- T. opacum (Corda) S. Hughes (1952) = Pleotrichocladium opacum, Melanommataceae
- T. pavgii V.R. Nath (1979) = Pithomyces pavgii, Astrosphaeriellaceae
- T. tenellum Harz (1871) = Diplosporium tenellum, Chaetosphaerellaceae
- T. ucrainicum Kiril. (1967) = Monodictys ucrainica, Ascomycota
- T. uniseptatum (Berk. & Broome) S. Hughes & Piroz. (1973) = Triadelphia uniseptata, Triadelphiaceae
