= Ceriosporopsis =

Scientific classification
- Kingdom: Fungi
- Division: Ascomycota
- Class: Sordariomycetes
- Order: Microascales
- Family: Halosphaeriaceae
- Genus: Ceriosporopsis; Linder

Type species
- Ceriosporopsis halima Linder

Genus of fungi

Ceriosporopsis is a genus of fungi in the family Halosphaeriaceae. The genus contained seven species in 2008, and 8 species in 2023.

== Species ==
As accepted by Species Fungorum;

- Ceriosporopsis barbata Höhnk (1955)
- Ceriosporopsis caduca E.B.G. Jones & Zainal (1988)
- Ceriosporopsis calyptrata Kohlm. (1960)
- Ceriosporopsis cambrensis I.M. Wilson (1954)
- Ceriosporopsis capillacea Kohlm. (1981)
- Ceriosporopsis halima Linder (1944)
- Ceriosporopsis longissima Kohlm. (1962)
- Ceriosporopsis minuta Abdel-Wahab, Nagah. & E.B.G. Jones (2017)

Former species (all are Halosphaeriaceae family, unless stated);

- C. circumvestita (Kohlm.) Kohlm. (1972) = Lautisporopsis circumvestita
- C. hamata Höhnk (1955) = Remispora hamata
- C. intricata (Jørg. Koch & E.B.G. Jones) Sakay., K.L. Pang & E.B.G. Jones (2011) = Bovicornua intricata
- C. submarina (Linder) E. Müll. (1962) = Lentescospora submarina, Ascomycota
- C. sundica Jørg. Koch & E.B.G. Jones (1986) = Limacospora sundica
- C. tubulifera (Kohlm.) P.W. Kirk ex Kohlm. (1972) = Toriella tubulifera
