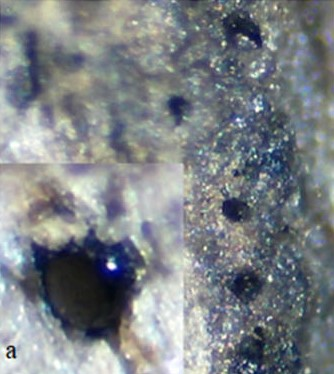
- Ascomata of Savoryella longispora

Scientific classification
- Domain: Eukaryota
- Kingdom: Fungi
- Division: Ascomycota
- Class: Sordariomycetes
- Order: Savoryellales
- Family: Savoryellaceae
- Genus: Savoryella; E.B.G. Jones & R.A. Eaton,

Type species
- Savoryella lignicola E.B.G.Jones & R.A.Eaton

= Savoryella =

Genus of fungi

Savoryella is a genus of freshwater and marine based fungi in the family Savoryellaceae and the order Savoryellales.

== History ==
The taxonomic placement of Savoryella species has been widely debated since it was published, and the genus had been tentatively assigned to various orders within the Sordariomycetes class.

The genus had been tentatively placed in order Sphaeriales (now Diaporthales) incertae sedis by Kohlmeyer & Kohlmeyer in 1979, Ascomycetes incertae sedis by Eriksson & Hawksworth in 1986, family Amphisphaeriaceae by Eriksson & Hawksworth in 1987, order Sordariales by Jones & Hyde in 1992, and order Halosphaeriales by Read et al. in 1993 based on morphological features. Vijaykrishna et al. in 2006 showed Savoryella belongs to Hypocreales order based on phylogenetic analysis of partial small subunit rRNA (SSU). The genus Savoryella, based on morphological features, was then placed in the Sordariales order genera incertae sedis by Jones et al. (2009), and, later, Boonyuen et al. (2011), showed that genera Savoryella, Ascotaiwania, Ascothailandia, and Canalisporium all cluster in the order Savoryellales within class Hypocreomycetidae, Sordariomycetes.

The family Savoryellaceae was then established by Jaklitsch and Réblová in 2015, and was typified by the genus Savoryella. Boonyuen et al. (2011), had earlier introduced the order Savoryellales, but without designating a family to it. According to phylogenetic and molecular clock analyses (Hongsanan et al., 2017; Hyde et al., 2017), the orders Conioscyphales, Fuscosporellales, Pleurotheciales, and Savoryellales cluster together as a distinct clade, with a stem age of 268 Mya. Hence, the order Savoryellales was referred to a new subclass Savoryellomycetidae by Hongsanan et al. in 2017, which was then supported by other studies.

Fossilised fungal spores have been found in topsoil samples on Tibetan Plateau in 2021. They were collected from different vegetation zones and show lots of variation. Savoryella spp. was found to be the dominant taxon in cropland samples.

== Taxonomy ==
The genus name of Savoryella is derived from John George Savory (1917-2003), who was a mycologist, born in Sacriston, Co Durham, England. He was the UK's leading expert on the special group of fungi that attack wood and wood-based materials. He made substantial contributions to testing technologies and to the derivation of national and European standards, as well as inspiring new studies on the microbial ecology of decay in wooden windows in the late 1960s and early 1970s. Then in the mid-1950s, he recognised and described a new group of wood-destroying microbes causing what he called "soft rot" - on account of the slimy texture conferred to the wood they degraded, especially under aquatic conditions. Then in 1969 a completely new genus of fungi was discovered by researchers at Portsmouth Polytechnic to cause soft rot in the marine environment, its identifier, Evan Benjamin Gareth Jones, gave it the name of Savoryella in tribute to Savory. with Latin diminutive suffix ellus.

== Description ==
Members of the Savoryella genus, are characterized by immersed (growing wholly under water) to superficial (being on or near the surface) ascomata, (fruiting body), papillate (covered in papillae/hairs), periphysate, clavate (club-shaped) to cylindrical, unitunicate (single-walled) asci with a non-amyloid apical thickening containing a pore, and ellipsoidal, 3-septate (walled) ascospores (spores contained in an ascus) are ellipsoid to fusiform (spindle or rod-shaped), with brown central cells and hyaline (translucent) polar cells. Paraphyses of Savoryella are inconspicuous at maturity.

The apical pore or apparatus of ascus was not originally described by Jones and Eaton, 1969). Later, Jones and Hyde (1992) observed the asci and apical apparatus of species; Savoryella appendiculata, Savoryella longispora, and Savoryella paucispora. Ultra-structural observations of asci and ascospores with transmission electron microscopy (TEM) by Read et al. (1992) described the ascal apical ring of Savoryella appendiculata and Savoryella longispora as extending subapically on to the side walls of the ascus.

Taxonomic studies of marine Ascomycotina with the ultra-structure of the asci, ascospores and appendages of Savoryella were studied in 1993. They revealed that the unitunicate ascus wall comprised an outer, 30–40 nm electron-dense layer and an inner, 420–450 nm, thick, electron-transparent layer.

The sexual morphs of Savoryellales species have perithecial (spherical, cylindrical, or flask-shaped hollow) ascomata (fruiting body) with elongate necks, while the asexual morphs are dematiaceous (produce melanin in their cell walls, giving them a characteristic brown colour especially when grown on agar) hyphomycetes with semi-macronematous conidiophores (morphologically different conidiophore from the vegetative hyphae) and monoblastic (one primary germ layer) conidiogenous (producing conidia) cells.

The ascospores of species Savoryella appendiculata and Savoryella paucispora have mucilaginous (sticky or viscous when wet) sheath around the central cells (Boonyuen et al., 2011). Also, Savoryella appendiculata is the solitary species in this genus with ascospores with polar tetradiate appendages, formed as an outgrowth of the hyaline apical cell of the ascospore on release from the ascus (Jones and Hyde, 1992; Read et al., 1993).

== Distribution and habitats ==
Savoryella species are found on decaying wood or substrates submerged in freshwater, marine, and brackish habitats (Jones & Eaton 1969, Minoura & Muroi 1978, Koch 1982, Hyde & Goh 1998, Jones & Hyde 1992, Hyde 1993, Hyde 1994, Ho et al. 1997, Ho 2002, Hyde & Jones 1998, Abdel-Wahab & Jones 2000, Jones et al. 2016, Dayarathne et al. 2019,). Including places such as water-cooling towers. Species Savoryella lignicola was initially described from test panels of Fagus sylvestris and Pinus sylvestris which were exposed in a water cooling tower exposed to brackish water.

Most Savoryella species have a cosmopolitan distribution, although they are mostly common in tropical and subtropical ecosystems. They are found in places such as India, Sri Lanka, Hong Kong, Japan, and Australia.

Savoryella melanospora has been found with other fungi in intertidal mangrove forests within Thailand.

== Species ==
In 2019, the genus had eleven species that include five marine, and six freshwater species. As accepted by Species Fungorum;

- Savoryella appendiculata K.D. Hyde & E.B.G. Jones (1992)
- Savoryella aquatica K.D. Hyde (1993)
- Savoryella curvispora W.H. Ho, K.D. Hyde & Hodgkiss (1997)
- Savoryella fusiformis W.H. Ho, K.D. Hyde & Hodgkiss (1997)
- Savoryella grandispora K.D. Hyde (1994)
- Savoryella lignicola E.B.G. Jones & R.A. Eaton (1969)
- Savoryella longispora E.B.G. Jones & K.D. Hyde (1992)
- Savoryella melanospora Abdel-Wahab & E.B.G. Jones (2000)
- Savoryella nypae (K.D. Hyde & Goh) S.N. Zhang, K.D. Hyde & J.K. Liu (2019)
- Savoryella paucispora (Cribb & J.W. Cribb) J. Koch (1982)
- Savoryella sarushimana Abdel-Wahab & E.B.G. Jones (2019)
- Savoryella verrucosa Minoura & T. Muroi (1978)
- Savoryella yunnanensis Dong Wei, Dayar. & K.D. Hyde (2019)

Former species;

- S. limnetica H.S. Chang & S.Y. Hsieh (1998) = Neoascotaiwania limnetica, Savoryellaceae
