= Bovicornua =

Scientific classification
- Domain: Eukaryota
- Kingdom: Fungi
- Division: Ascomycota
- Class: Sordariomycetes
- Order: Microascales
- Family: Halosphaeriaceae
- Genus: Bovicornua; Jørg.Koch & E.B.G.Jones (1993)
- Species: B. intricata

Binomial name
- Bovicornua intricata Jørg.Koch & E.B.G.Jones (1993)

Genus of fungi

Bovicornua is a fungal genus in the family Halosphaeriaceae. It is a monotypic genus, containing the single species Bovicornua intricata, a marine fungus formally described as new to science in 1993 by mycologists Jørgen Koch and E.B. Gareth Jones. Bovicornua is distinguished from Ceriosporopsis (the genus from which it was separated) by the structural complexity of its ascospores.
