= Ocostaspora =

Scientific classification
- Kingdom: Fungi
- Division: Ascomycota
- Class: Sordariomycetes
- Order: Microascales
- Family: Chadefaudiellaceae
- Genus: Ocostaspora; E.B.G.Jones, R.G.Johnson & S.T.Moss (1983)

Type species
- Ocostaspora apilongissima E.B.G.Jones, R.G.Johnson & S.T.Moss (1983)

Species
- O. apilongissima O. apiolongissoma

Genus of fungi

Ocostaspora is a genus of fungi in the family Halosphaeriaceae.
