= Appendichordella =

Scientific classification
- Kingdom: Fungi
- Division: Ascomycota
- Class: Sordariomycetes
- Order: Microascales
- Family: Halosphaeriaceae
- Genus: Appendichordella; R.G.Johnson, E.B.G.Jones & S.T.Moss

Type species
- Appendichordella amicta (Kohlm.) R.G.Johnson, E.B.G.Jones & S.T.Moss

Genus of fungi

Appendichordella is a genus of fungi in the Halosphaeriaceae family. This is a monotypic genus, containing the single species Appendichordella amicta.
