= Nohea =

Scientific classification
- Kingdom: Fungi
- Division: Ascomycota
- Class: Sordariomycetes
- Order: Microascales
- Family: Halosphaeriaceae
- Genus: Nohea & Volkm.-Kohlm.

Type species
- Nohea umiumi Kohlm. & Volkm.-Kohlm.

Genus of fungi

Nohea is a genus of fungi in the family Halosphaeriaceae. This is a monotypic genus, containing the single species Nohea umiumi.
