= Tirispora =

Scientific classification
- Kingdom: Fungi
- Division: Ascomycota
- Class: Sordariomycetes
- Order: Microascales
- Family: Halosphaeriaceae
- Genus: Tirispora; E.B.G.Jones & Vrijmoed

Type species
- Tirispora unicaudata E.B.G.Jones & Vrijmoed

Genus of fungi

Tirispora is a genus of fungi in the family Halosphaeriaceae. The genus contains two species.
