= Savoryellomycetidae =

Scientific classification
- Kingdom: Fungi
- Division: Ascomycota
- Class: Sordariomycetes
- Subclass: Savoryellomycetidae; Hongsanan, K.D. Hyde & Maharachch., Fungal Diversity 84: 35 in 2017

Orders
- Conioscyphales; Fuscosporellales; Pleurotheciales; Savoryellales

Subclass of sac fungi

Savoryellomycetidae is a subclass of sac fungi within the class of Sordariomycetes. It contains 4 known orders of Conioscyphales, Fuscosporellales, Pleurotheciales and Savoryellales.

== History ==
In 2011, Boonyuen et al. introduced the order Savoryellales, but without designating a family (or class) to it.

Then in 2015, the family Savoryellaceae (located in the Savoryellales order) was established by botanists Jaklitsch and Réblová, and was typified by the genus Savoryella. Orders Fuscosporellales (formed in 2016,) and Savoryellales were initially placed in class Hypocreomycetidae (Sordariomycetes).

According to Maharachchikumbura et al. (2016b) and Yang et al. (2016b). Conioscyphales (founded in 2015,) were originally placed within Diaporthomycetidae class, genera incertae sedis, while other orders such as Fuscosporellales, Pleurotheciales, and Savoryellales were included in the subclass Hypocreomycetidae.

Pleurotheciales (also formed in 2015,) is the largest order in Savoryellomycetidae with a large proportion of species known from freshwater habitats. It was initially placed within Hypocreomycetidae (Sordariomycetes).

Hongsanan et al. (2017), and Hyde et al. (2017), suggested according to phylogenetic and molecular clock analyses with combined ITS, LSU, SSU and rpb2 sequence data. That the stem age of the subclass Sordariomycetes falls in the range of 250–289 Mya (million years ago) hence, Savoryellales was then placed in a new subclass Savoryellomycetidae as its emergence goes back to early Mesozoic (201–252 Mya).

The orders Conioscyphales, Fuscosporellales, Pleurotheciales, and Savoryellales are grouped together as a distinct clade, with a stem age of 268 mya. This was then later supported by other studies included a paper by Dayarathne et al. (2019a).

The stem age of Pleurotheciales is around 143 Mya, while it was reported as 139 Mya in Hongsanan et al. (2017); Conioscyphales, the sister clade of Pleurotheciales, evolved at the stem age of 180 Mya. Further, Fuscosporellales and Savoryellales have evolved at the stem ages of 249 Mya and 213 Mya, respectively. Therefore, order level status within Savoryellomycetidae range from 143–249 Mya, with families having crown ages of 104–182 Mya. Dayarathne et al. (2019a) results indicate that the most basal group of marine-based taxa are represented within Lulworthiales, which diverged from ancestral Sordariomycetes around 149 Mya (91–209) and Savoryellomycetidae around 213 Mya (198–303).

In 2019, based on the outline and multi gene phylogeny of freshwater Sordariomycetes were scattered in six sub-classes, including; Diaporthomycetidae, Hypocreomycetidae, Lulworthiomycetidae, Savoryellomycetidae, Sordariomycetidae and Xylariomycetidae. In 2019, five subclades comprising Conioscyphaceae, Fuscosporellaceae, Pleurotheciaceae and Savoryellaceae, and a clade with Ascotaiwania hughesii (DAOM 241947, P2-6) strains and Monotosporella setosa (HKUCC 3713) were also recognized within the subclass Savoryellomycetidae.

In a second multi-locus phylogenetic analysis in 2021, a total of seven subclasses (Diaporthomycetidae, Hypocreomycetidae, Lulworthiomycetidae, Pisorisporiomycetidae, Savoryellomycetidae, Sordariomycetidae and Xylariomycetidae) in Sordariomycetes, as well as Pseudocoleodictyospora and its relatives in Dothideomycetes were included in the later dataset.

Currently there are four orders and four families in this subclass.

== Unplaced ==
Savoryellomycetidae genera incertae sedis; Flammispora Pinruan et al., Stud Mycol 50(2): 384 (2004), (includes Flammispora bioteca Pinruan et al. and Flammispora pulchra Raja & Shearer.

== Distribution ==
It has a scattered distribution worldwide, including Southern Europe, and China.
