= Nautosphaeria =

Scientific classification
- Kingdom: Fungi
- Division: Ascomycota
- Class: Sordariomycetes
- Order: Microascales
- Family: Halosphaeriaceae
- Genus: Nautosphaeria; E.B.G.Jones (1964)

Type species
- Nautosphaeria cristaminuta E.B.G.Jones (1964)

Genus of fungi

Nautosphaeria is a genus of fungi in the family Halosphaeriaceae. This is a monotypic genus, containing the single species Nautosphaeria cristaminuta, which was found on submerged wood.

The genus was introduced by Jones in 1964. It is characterized by spherical, hyaline to cream-colored ascomata, broadly clavate or ellipsoidal, pedunculate asci and one-celled, ellipsoidal, hyaline (glass-like) conidia which possess a tuft of bristle-like appendages at each end and four tufts around the equator (Jones 1964). Phylogenetic analysis showed that Nautosphaeria was clustered with Tubakiella basal to Halosphaeriaceae family (Sakayaroj et al. 2011).
