= Sablicola =

Scientific classification
- Domain: Eukaryota
- Kingdom: Fungi
- Division: Ascomycota
- Class: Sordariomycetes
- Order: Microascales
- Family: Halosphaeriaceae
- Genus: Sablicola; E.B.G.Jones, K.L.Pang & Vrijmoed (2004)
- Species: S. chinensis

Binomial name
- Sablicola chinensis E.B.G.Jones, K.L.Pang & Vrijmoed (2004)

Genus of fungi

Sablicola is a fungal genus in the family Halosphaeriaceae. It is a monotypic genus, containing the single species Sablicola chinensis, described as new to science in 2004. This is a marine fungus that was collected from brackish water in the Pearl River Estuary in southern China. It features ascospores that have two polar and four equatorial, flattened, attenuate, strap-like appendages with parallel striations. These striations break down into fine threads when mounted in seawater.
