= Okeanomyces =

Scientific classification
- Kingdom: Fungi
- Division: Ascomycota
- Class: Sordariomycetes
- Order: Microascales
- Family: Halosphaeriaceae
- Genus: Okeanomyces; K.L.Pang & E.B.G.Jones (2004)

Type species
- Okeanomyces cucullatus K.L.Pang & E.B.G.Jones (2004)

Genus of fungi

Okeanomyces is a genus of fungi in the family Halosphaeriaceae. This is a monotypic genus, containing the single species Okeanomyces cucullatus, described as new to science in 2004.
