= Cucullosporella =

Scientific classification
- Kingdom: Fungi
- Division: Ascomycota
- Class: Sordariomycetes
- Order: Microascales
- Family: Halosphaeriaceae
- Genus: Cucullosporella; K.D.Hyde & E.B.G.Jones (1990)

Type species
- Cucullosporella mangrovei (K.D.Hyde & E.B.G.Jones) K.D.Hyde & E.B.G.Jones (1990)

Genus of fungi

Cucullosporella is a genus of fungi in the family Halosphaeriaceae. This is a monotypic genus, containing the single species Cucullosporella mangrovei.
