= Neptunella =

Scientific classification
- Kingdom: Fungi
- Division: Ascomycota
- Class: Sordariomycetes
- Order: Microascales
- Family: Halosphaeriaceae
- Genus: Neptunella; K.L.Pang & E.B.G.Jones (2003)

Type species
- Neptunella longirostris (Cribb & J.W.Cribb) K.L.Pang & E.B.G.Jones (2003)

Synonyms
- Gnomonia longirostris Cribb & J.W.Cribb (1956); Lignincola longirostris (Cribb & J.W.Cribb) Kohlm. (1984)

Genus of fungi

Neptunella is a fungal genus in the family Halosphaeriaceae. It is a monotypic genus, containing the single species Neptunella longirostris, described as new to science in 1956.

It has been found in intertidal mangrove forests within other fungi species and genera in Thailand.
