= Nereiospora =

Scientific classification
- Kingdom: Fungi
- Division: Ascomycota
- Class: Sordariomycetes
- Order: Microascales
- Family: Halosphaeriaceae
- Genus: Nereiospora; E.B.G.Jones, R.G.Johnson & S.T.Moss

Type species
- Nereiospora comata (Kohlm.) E.B.G.Jones, R.G.Johnson & S.T.Moss

Genus of fungi

Nereiospora is a genus of fungi in the family Halosphaeriaceae. The genus contains two species.
