= Phaeonectriella =

Scientific classification
- Kingdom: Fungi
- Division: Ascomycota
- Class: Sordariomycetes
- Order: Microascales
- Family: Halosphaeriaceae
- Genus: Phaeonectriella; Eaton & E.B.G.Jones

Type species
- Phaeonectriella lignicola R.A.Eaton & E.B.G.Jones

Species
- A. appendiculata A. lignicola

Genus of fungi

Phaeonectriella is a genus of fungi in the family Halosphaeriaceae.
