= Naufragella =

Scientific classification
- Kingdom: Fungi
- Division: Ascomycota
- Class: Sordariomycetes
- Order: Microascales
- Family: Halosphaeriaceae
- Genus: Naufragella; Kohlm. & Volkm.-Kohlm. (1998)

Type species
- Naufragella delmarensis Kohlm. & Volkm.-Kohlm. (1998)

Species
- Naufragella spinibarbata; Naufragella delmarensis

Genus of fungi

Naufragella is a genus of fungi in the family Halosphaeriaceae. The genus contains two species, Naufragella spinibarbata and Naufragella delmarensis.
