= Pseudolignincola =

Scientific classification
- Kingdom: Fungi
- Division: Ascomycota
- Class: Sordariomycetes
- Order: Microascales
- Family: Halosphaeriaceae
- Genus: Pseudolignincola; Chatmala & E.B.G.Jones

Type species
- Pseudolignincola siamensis Chatmala & E.B.G.Jones

Genus of fungi

Pseudolignincola is a genus of fungi in the family Halosphaeriaceae. This is a monotypic genus, containing the single species Pseudolignincola siamensis.
