= Oceanitis =

Scientific classification
- Kingdom: Fungi
- Division: Ascomycota
- Class: Sordariomycetes
- Order: Microascales
- Family: Halosphaeriaceae
- Genus: Oceanitis; Kohlm. (1977)

Type species
- Oceanitis scuticella Kohlm. (1977)

Species
- O. cincinnatula O. scuticella O. unicaudata O. viscidula

Synonyms
- Ascosalsum J.Campb. (2003); Falcatispora K.L.Pang & E.B.G.Jones (2003)

Genus of fungi

Oceanitis is a genus of marine fungi in the class Halosphaeriaceae. It has four species. The genus was circumscribed by mycologist Jan Kohlmeyer in 1977, with Oceanitis scuticella assigned as the type species.

The genus name of Oceanitis refers to the Greek mythology, the Oceanids or Oceanides (the daughters of Oceanus).

Oceanitis cincinnatula and other fungi genera (including Aniptodera salsuginosa) have been found in intertidal mangrove forests within Thailand.

== Species ==
- Oceanitis cincinnatula (Shearer & J.L.Crane) J.Dupont & E.B.G.Jones (2009)
- Oceanitis scuticella Kohlm. (1977)
- Oceanitis unicaudata (E.B.G.Jones & Camp.-Als.) J.Dupont & E.B.G.Jones (2009)
- Oceanitis viscidula (Kohlm. & E.Kohlm.) J.Dupont & E.B.G.Jones (2009)
