= Iwilsoniella =

Scientific classification
- Kingdom: Fungi
- Division: Ascomycota
- Class: Sordariomycetes
- Order: Microascales
- Family: Halosphaeriaceae
- Genus: Iwilsoniella; E.B.G.Jones (1991)

Type species
- Iwilsoniella rotunda E.B.G.Jones (1991)

Single-species fungal genus

Iwilsoniella is a fungal genus in the family Halosphaeriaceae. This is a monotypic genus, containing the single species Iwilsoniella rotunda.
