= Limacospora =

Scientific classification
- Kingdom: Fungi
- Division: Ascomycota
- Class: Sordariomycetes
- Order: Microascales
- Family: Halosphaeriaceae
- Genus: Limacospora; E.B.G.Jones, Jørg.Koch, McKeown & S.T.Moss

Type species
- Limacospora sundica (Jørg.Koch & E.B.G.Jones) Jørg.Koch & E.B.G.Jones

Genus of fungi

Limacospora is a genus of fungi in the Halosphaeriaceae family. This is a monotypic genus, containing the single species Limacospora sundica.
