= Morakotiella =

Scientific classification
- Kingdom: Fungi
- Division: Ascomycota
- Class: Sordariomycetes
- Order: Microascales
- Family: Halosphaeriaceae
- Genus: Morakotiella; Sakay. (2005)

Type species
- Morakotiella salina (C.A.Farrant & E.B.G.Jones) Sakay. (2005)

Genus of fungi

Morakotiella is a genus of fungi in the family Halosphaeriaceae. This is a monotypic genus, containing the single species Morakotiella salina, first described in 1986 as Haligena salina.
