= Trailia =

Scientific classification
- Kingdom: Fungi
- Division: Ascomycota
- Class: Sordariomycetes
- Order: Microascales
- Family: Halosphaeriaceae
- Genus: Trailia; G.K. Sutherl.

Type species
- Trailia ascophylli G.K. Sutherl.

Genus of fungi

Trailia is a genus of fungi in the family Halosphaeriaceae.

The genus was circumscribed by Georg Kenneth Sutherland in Trans. Brit. Mycol. Soc. vol.5 (1) on page 149 in 1915 and also New Phytologist vol.14 on page 193 in 1915.

The genus name of Trailia is in honour of James William Helenus Trail FRS FLS (1851–1919), who was a Scottish botanist who served as Professor of Botany at Aberdeen University from 1877 to 1919.

== Species ==
As accepted by Species Fungorum;

- Trailia ascophylli G.K. Sutherl. (1915)

Former species;

- Trailia buxi (Arthur) Syd. (1922) = Puccinia buxi, Pucciniaceae family
- Trailia morthieri (Körn.) Syd. (1922) = Puccinia morthieri, Pucciniaceae
