= Corallicola =

Scientific classification
- Kingdom: Fungi
- Division: Ascomycota
- Class: Sordariomycetes
- Order: Microascales
- Family: Halosphaeriaceae
- Genus: Corallicola; Volkm.-Kohlm. & Kohlm. (1992)

Type species
- Corallicola nana Volkm.-Kohlm. & Kohlm. (1992)

Genus of fungi

Corallicola is a fungal genus in the family Halosphaeriaceae. This is a monotypic genus, containing the single species Corallicola nana.
