= Bathyascus =

Scientific classification
- Kingdom: Fungi
- Division: Ascomycota
- Class: Sordariomycetes
- Order: Microascales
- Family: Halosphaeriaceae
- Genus: Bathyascus; J. Kohlmeyer, 1977

Type species
- Bathyascus vermisporus Kohlm. (1977)

Genus of fungi

Bathyascus is a genus of fungi in the family Halosphaeriaceae. According to a 2008 estimate, the genus contains five species. It still retained the same number in 2020.

== Species ==
As accepted by Species Fungorum;

- Bathyascus avicenniae Kohlm. (1980)
- Bathyascus grandisporus K.D. Hyde (1987)
- Bathyascus mangrovei Ravik. & Vittal (1991)
- Bathyascus tropicalis Kohlm. (1980)
- Bathyascus vermisporus Kohlm. (1977)
