= Saagaromyces =

Scientific classification
- Kingdom: Fungi
- Division: Ascomycota
- Class: Sordariomycetes
- Order: Microascales
- Family: Halosphaeriaceae
- Genus: Saagaromyces; K.L. Pang & E.B.G. Jones

Type species
- Saagaromyces ratnagiriensis (S.D. Patil & Borse) K.L. Pang & E.B.G. Jones

Genus of fungi

Saagaromyces is a genus of fungi in the family Halosphaeriaceae. The genus contained three species in 2008, and 4 species in 2023.

== Species ==
As accepted by Species Fungorum;

- Saagaromyces abonnis (Kohlm.) K.L. Pang & E.B.G. Jones (2003)
- Saagaromyces glitra (J.L. Crane & Shearer) K.L. Pang & E.B.G. Jones (2003)
- Saagaromyces mangrovei Abdel-Wahab, Bahkali & E.B.G. Jones (2015)
- Saagaromyces ratnagiriensis (S.D. Patil & Borse) K.L. Pang & E.B.G. Jones (2003)
