= Thalassogena =

Scientific classification
- Kingdom: Fungi
- Division: Ascomycota
- Class: Sordariomycetes
- Order: Microascales
- Family: Halosphaeriaceae
- Genus: Thalassogena; Kohlm. & Volkm.-Kohlm.

Type species
- Thalassogena sphaerica Kohlm. & Volkm.-Kohlm.

Genus of fungi

Thalassogena is a genus of fungi in the family Halosphaeriaceae. This is a monotypic genus, containing the single species Thalassogena sphaerica.
