= Ondiniella =

Scientific classification
- Kingdom: Fungi
- Division: Ascomycota
- Class: Sordariomycetes
- Order: Microascales
- Family: Halosphaeriaceae
- Genus: Ondiniella; E.B.G.Jones, R.G.Johnson & S.T.Moss (1984)

Type species
- Ondiniella torquata (Kohlm.) E.B.G. Jones, R.G.Johnson & S.T.Moss (1984)

Genus of fungi

Ondiniella is a fungal genus in the family Halosphaeriaceae. This is a monotypic genus, containing the single species Ondiniella torquata.
