= Arenariomyces =

Scientific classification
- Kingdom: Fungi
- Division: Ascomycota
- Class: Sordariomycetes
- Order: Microascales
- Family: Halosphaeriaceae
- Genus: Arenariomyces; Höhnk (1954)

Type species
- Arenariomyces trifurcatus Höhnk (1954)

Genus of fungi

Arenariomyces is a genus of fungi in the family Halosphaeriaceae. The genus contains five species.

== Species ==
As accepted by Species Fungorum;

- Arenariomyces cinctus Höhnk (1954)
- Arenariomyces majusculus Kohlm. & Volkm.-Kohlm. (1989)
- Arenariomyces parvulus Jørg. Koch (1986)
- Arenariomyces triseptatus Kohlm. (1984)
- Arenariomyces truncatellus Jørg. Koch (2013)

Former species;

- A. quadri-remis (Höhnk) Meyers (1957) = Halosphaeria quadri-remis, Halosphaeriaceae
- A. salinus Meyers (1957) = Haiyanga salina, Halosphaeriaceae
- A. trifurcatus Höhnk (1954) = Corollospora trifurcata, Halosphaeriaceae
