= Haligena =

Scientific classification
- Kingdom: Fungi
- Division: Ascomycota
- Class: Sordariomycetes
- Order: Microascales
- Family: Halosphaeriaceae
- Genus: Haligena; Kohlm.

Type species
- Haligena elaterophora Kohlm.

Genus of fungi

Haligena is a genus of fungi in the Halosphaeriaceae family. This is a monotypic genus, containing the single species Haligena elaterophora.
