= Anisostagma =

Scientific classification
- Kingdom: Fungi
- Division: Ascomycota
- Class: Sordariomycetes
- Order: Microascales
- Family: Halosphaeriaceae
- Genus: Anisostagma; K.R.L. Petersen & Jørgen Koch

Type species
- Anisostagma rotundatum K.R.L. Petersen & Jørg. Koch

Genus of fungi

Anisostagma is a genus of fungi in the Halosphaeriaceae family. This is a monotypic genus, containing the single species Anisostagma rotundatum.
