= Chadefaudiella =

Scientific classification
- Kingdom: Fungi
- Division: Ascomycota
- Class: Sordariomycetes
- Order: Microascales
- Family: Chadefaudiellaceae
- Genus: Chadefaudiella; Faurel & Schotter

Genus of fungi

Chadefaudiella is a genus of fungi in the family Chadefaudiellaceae.

== Species ==
As accepted by Species Fungorum;

- Chadefaudiella quezelii Faurel & Schotter (1959)
- Chadefaudiella thomasii Faurel & Locq. (1972)
