= Lignincola =

Scientific classification
- Kingdom: Fungi
- Division: Ascomycota
- Class: Sordariomycetes
- Order: Microascales
- Family: Halosphaeriaceae
- Genus: Lignincola; Höhnk (1955)

Type species
- Lignincola laevis Höhnk (1955)

Genus of fungi

Lignincola is a genus of fungi in the family Halosphaeriaceae. The genus contains two species.
