= Ascosacculus =

Scientific classification
- Kingdom: Fungi
- Division: Ascomycota
- Class: Sordariomycetes
- Order: Microascales
- Family: Halosphaeriaceae
- Genus: Ascosacculus; J. Campb., J.L. Anderson & Shearer

Type species
- Ascosacculus aquaticus (K.D. Hyde) J. Campb., J.L. Anderson & Shearer

Genus of fungi

Ascosacculus is a genus of fungi in the Halosphaeriaceae family. The genus contains two species.
