= Nais (fungus) =

Scientific classification
- Kingdom: Fungi
- Division: Ascomycota
- Class: Sordariomycetes
- Order: Microascales
- Family: Halosphaeriaceae
- Genus: Nais; Kohlm. (1962)

Type species
- Naïs inornata Kohlm. (1962)

Species
- Nais aquatica Nais inornata

Genus of fungi

Nais is a genus of fungi in the family Halosphaeriaceae. The genus, which contains two species, was circumscribed by mycologist Jan Kohlmeyer in 1962 to contain Nais inornata. N. aquatica was described from submerged wood collected in north Queensland, Australia in 1992.
