= Lanspora =

Scientific classification
- Domain: Eukaryota
- Kingdom: Fungi
- Division: Ascomycota
- Class: Sordariomycetes
- Order: Phomatosporales
- Family: Phomatosporaceae
- Genus: Lanspora; K.D.Hyde & E.B.G.Jones (1986)

Type species
- Lanspora coronata K.D.Hyde & E.B.G.Jones (1986)

Species
- L. coronata L. cylindrospora

Genus of fungi

Lanspora is a genus of marine fungi in the family Phomatosporaceae. The genus was circumscribed in 1986 by mycologists Kevin D. Hyde and E.B. Gareth Jones with L. coronata as the type, and at that time, only species. Lanspora cylindrospora was added to the genus in 2020.

== Species ==
- Lanspora coronata K.D.Hyde & E.B.G.Jones (1986)
- Lanspora cylindrospora Devadatha, V.V.Sarma & E.B.G.Jones (2020)
