= James W. H. Trail =

Botanist and mycologist (1851–1919)

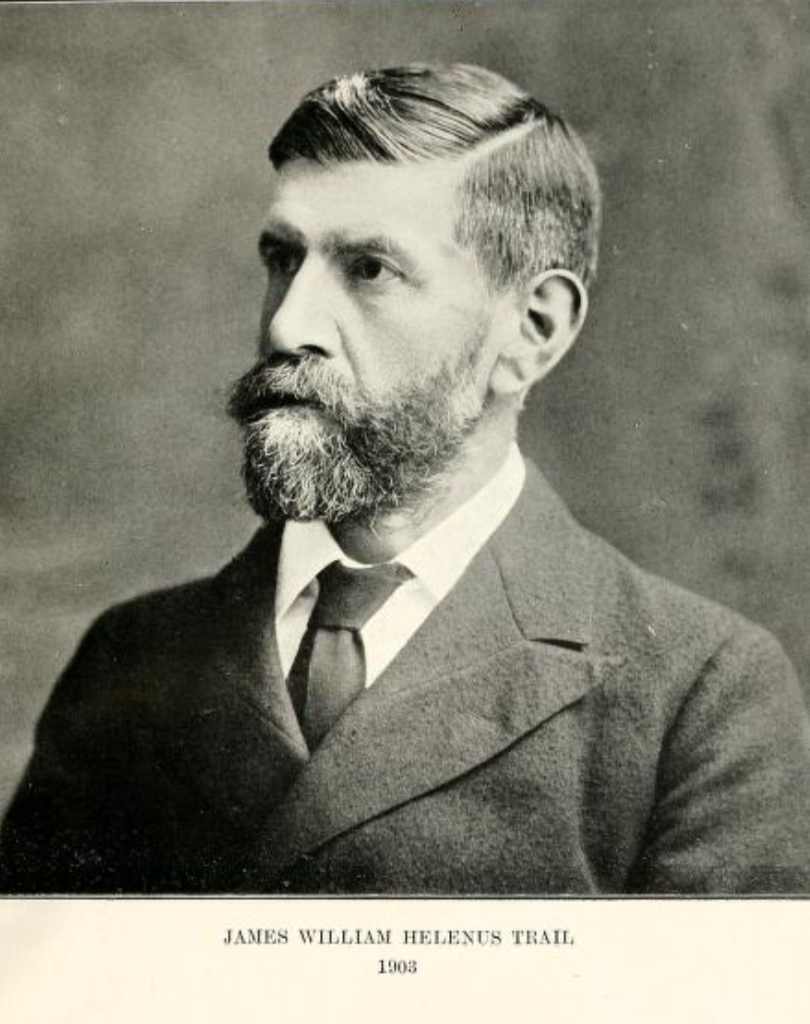
Professor James W. H. Trail

James William Helenus Trail FRS FLS (4 March 1851 – 18 September 1919) was a 20th-century botanist who served as Professor of Botany at Aberdeen University from 1877 to 1919. The standard author abbreviation Trail is used to indicate this person as the author when citing a botanical name.

== Life ==
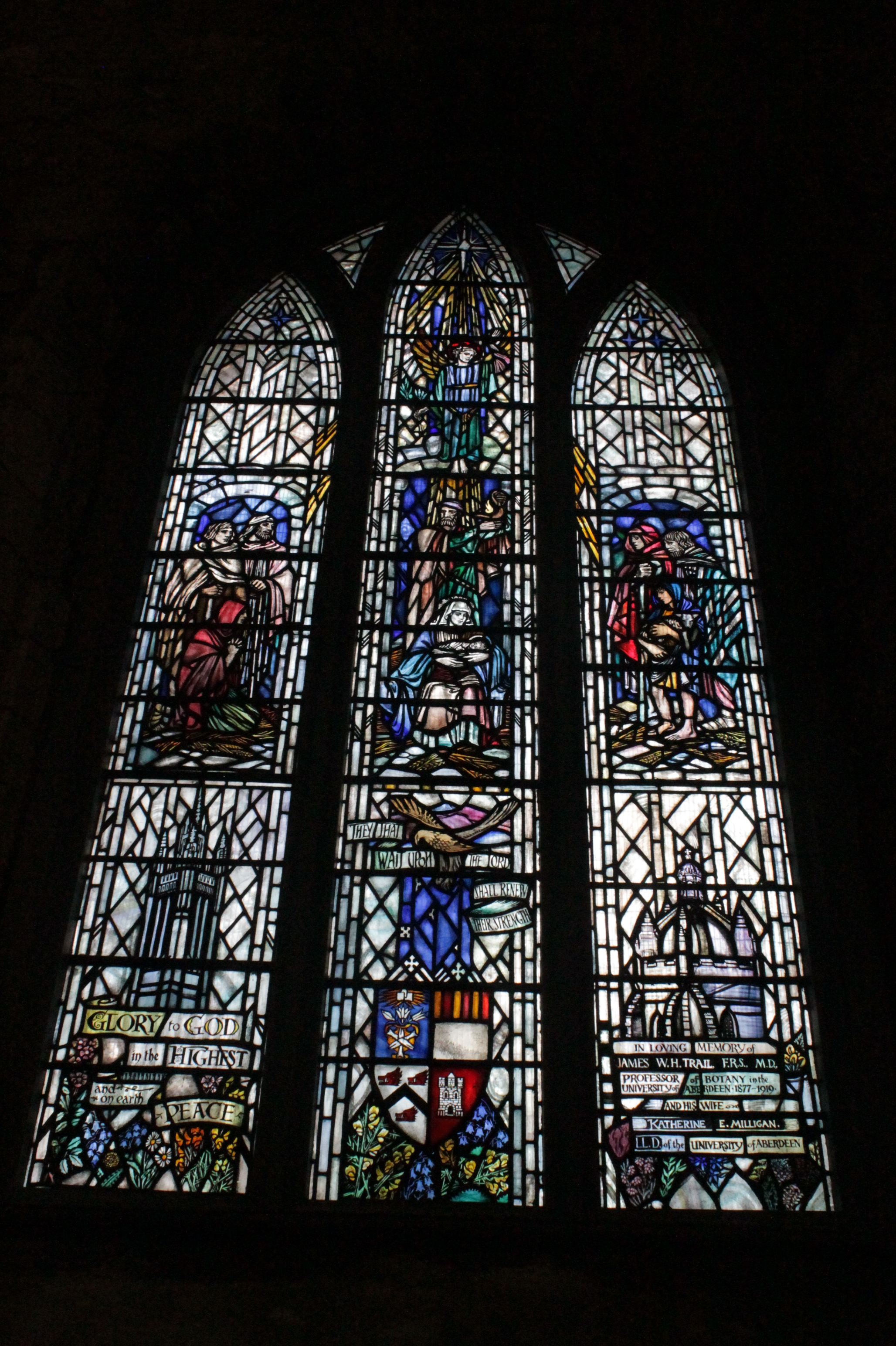
Memorial window to J W H Trail, St Machar's Cathedral

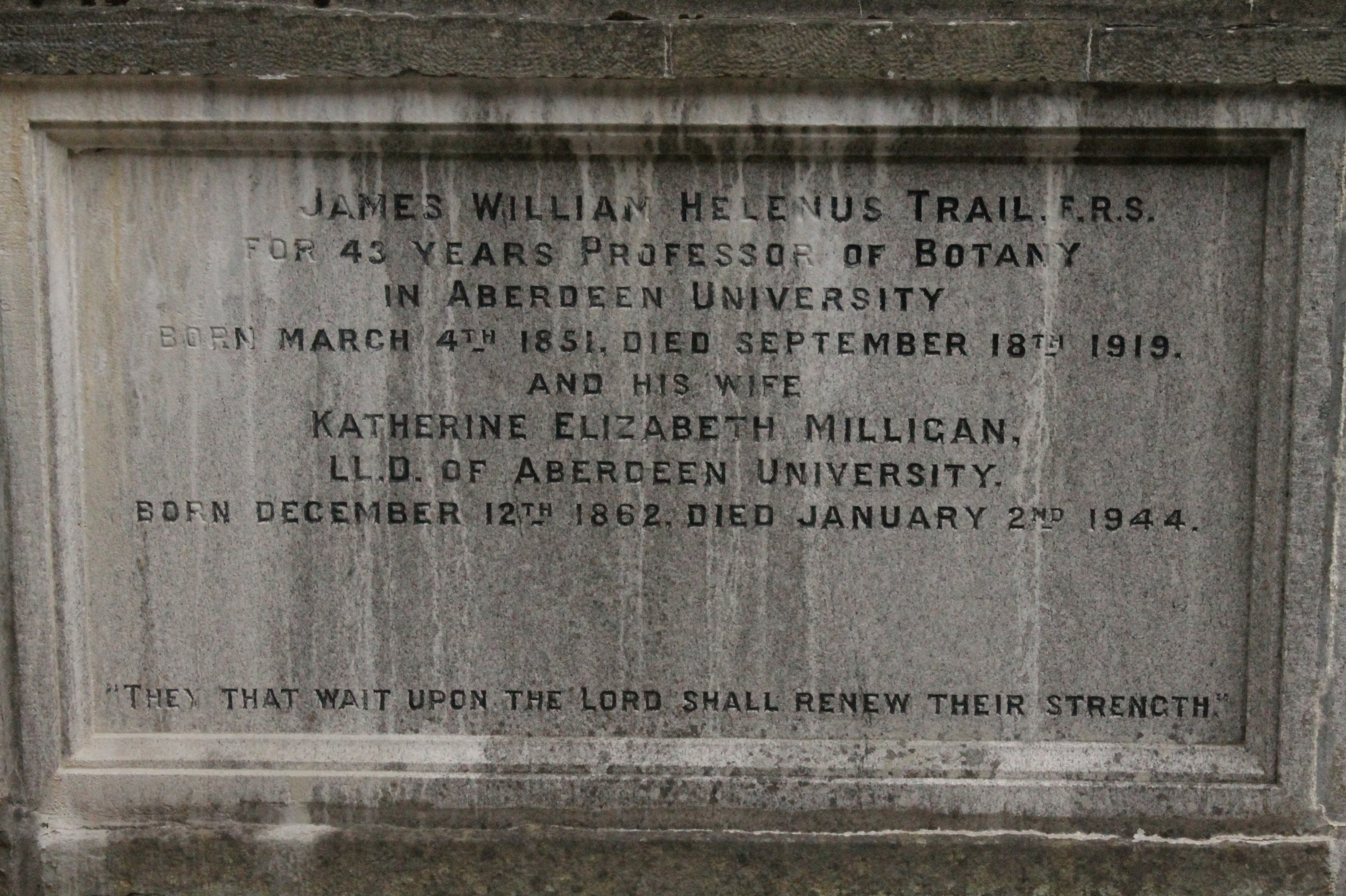
The grave of J W H Trail, churchyard of St Machar's Cathedral

He was born in Birsay on the isle of Orkney on 4 March 1851. His father, Rev Samuel Trail, moved to Aberdeen as Professor of Theology in 1868, but James appears to have been sent to Aberdeen somewhat earlier to be educated there. When his father came they lived in the "Divinity Manse". He is earlier thought to have lived with his uncle, Adam Trail (later Traill) a teacher at the North Free Church School, who lived at 5 North Broadford.

Despite a strong love of natural history he was pushed to study medicine at Aberdeen University and graduated MB ChB around 1871. However, in 1873 his love of botany was fed when he acquired an official post as botanist to the Amazon Steam Navigation Company, allowing him to spend two years in Brazil studying the tributaries of the River Amazon.

In 1876 he was appointed botanist to the colony of British Guiana but before he sailed he gained a superior position as Professor of Botany at Aberdeen University beginning in the autumn of 1877 in succession to Prof George Dickie.

In 1893 he was elected a Fellow of the Royal Society of London. He was also an active member of the Cairngorm Club.

In 1895 he was living at 71 High Street in Old Aberdeen, close to the university.

He died on 18 September 1919 following a short illness. He is buried on the north side of St. Machar's Cathedral in Old Aberdeen.

== Memorials ==
A fine stained glass windows in St Machar's Cathedral is dedicated to his memory. It was designed by Marjorie Kemp.

In 1915, Georg Kenneth Sutherland published Trailia, which is a genus of fungi in the family Halosphaeriaceae and named in Trail's honour.

== Publications ==
- The Fungi of Brazil (1874)
- "The Palms of Brazil" (Journal of Botany) (1876/77)
- The Annals of Scottish Natural History
- Flowering Plants and Fern Allies of the Cairngorms (1895)
- Flora of Buchan volumes I and II (1901-1904)
- Flora of the City Parish of Aberdeen (published posthumously as part of a memorial volume on his life; 1923)

== Family ==
He was married to Dr Katherine Elizabeth Milligan LLD (1862–1944), daughter of Rev Prof William Milligan also of the university.
