= Chadefaudia =

Scientific classification
- Kingdom: Fungi
- Division: Ascomycota
- Class: Sordariomycetes
- Order: Microascales
- Family: Halosphaeriaceae
- Genus: Chadefaudia; Feldm.-Maz. (1957)

Type species
- Chadefaudia marina Feldm.-Maz. (1957)

Genus of fungi

Chadefaudia is a genus of fungi in the family Halosphaeriaceae. The genus contains six species.

== Species ==
As accepted by Species Fungorum;

- Chadefaudia balliae Kohlm. (1973)
- Chadefaudia corallinarum (P. Crouan & H. Crouan) E. Müll. & Arx (1973)
- Chadefaudia gymnogongri (Feldmann) Kohlm. (1973)
- Chadefaudia marina Feldm.-Maz. (1957)
- Chadefaudia polyporolithi (Bonar) Kohlm. (1973)
- Chadefaudia schizymeniae Stegenga & Kemperman (1984)
