= Buxetroldia =

Scientific classification
- Domain: Eukaryota
- Kingdom: Fungi
- Division: Ascomycota
- Class: Sordariomycetes
- Order: Microascales
- Family: Halosphaeriaceae
- Genus: Buxetroldia; K.R.L.Petersen & Jørg.Koch. (1997)
- Species: B. bisaccata

Binomial name
- Buxetroldia bisaccata K.R.L.Petersen & Jørg.Koch (1997)

Single-species fungal genus

Buxetroldia is a fungal genus in the family Halosphaeriaceae. This is a monotypic genus, containing the single species Buxetroldia bisaccata, a marine fungus that was described as new to science in 1997.
