= Tunicatispora =

Scientific classification
- Kingdom: Fungi
- Division: Ascomycota
- Class: Sordariomycetes
- Order: Microascales
- Family: Halosphaeriaceae
- Genus: Tunicatispora; K.D. Hyde

Type species
- Tunicatispora australiensis K.D. Hyde

Genus of fungi

Tunicatispora is a genus of fungi in the family Halosphaeriaceae. This is a monotypic genus, containing the single species Tunicatispora australiensis.
