= Luttrellia =

Scientific classification
- Kingdom: Fungi
- Division: Ascomycota
- Class: Sordariomycetes
- Order: Microascales
- Family: Halosphaeriaceae
- Genus: Luttrellia; Shearer (1978)

Type species
- Luttrellia estuarina Shearer (1978)

Genus of fungi

Luttrellia is a genus of fungi in the family Halosphaeriaceae. The genus contains four species.

== Species ==
As accepted by Species Fungorum;

- Luttrellia estuarina Shearer (1978)
- Luttrellia guttulata A. Ferrer & Shearer (2007)
- Luttrellia halonata A. Ferrer & Shearer (2007)
- Luttrellia parvulospora A. Ferrer & Shearer (2007)

Former species (all now in the Pleosporaceae family;

- L. monoceras (Drechsler) Khokhr. (1978) = Exserohilum monoceras
- L. oryzae (Breda de Haan) Gornostaĭ (1978) = Bipolaris oryzae
- L. rostrata (Drechsler) Gornostaĭ (1978) = Exserohilum rostratum
- L. turcica (Pass.) Khokhr. (1978) = Exserohilum turcicum
