= Moana turbinulata =

Scientific classification
- Kingdom: Fungi
- Division: Ascomycota
- Class: Sordariomycetes
- Order: Microascales
- Family: Halosphaeriaceae
- Genus: Moana; Kohlm. & Volkm.-Kohlm. (1989)
- Species: M. turbinulata

Binomial name
- Moana turbinulata Kohlm. & Volkm.-Kohlm. (1989)

Species of fungus

Moana is a fungal genus in the family Halosphaeriaceae. This is a monotypic genus, containing the single species Moana turbinulata, described as new to science in 1989.
