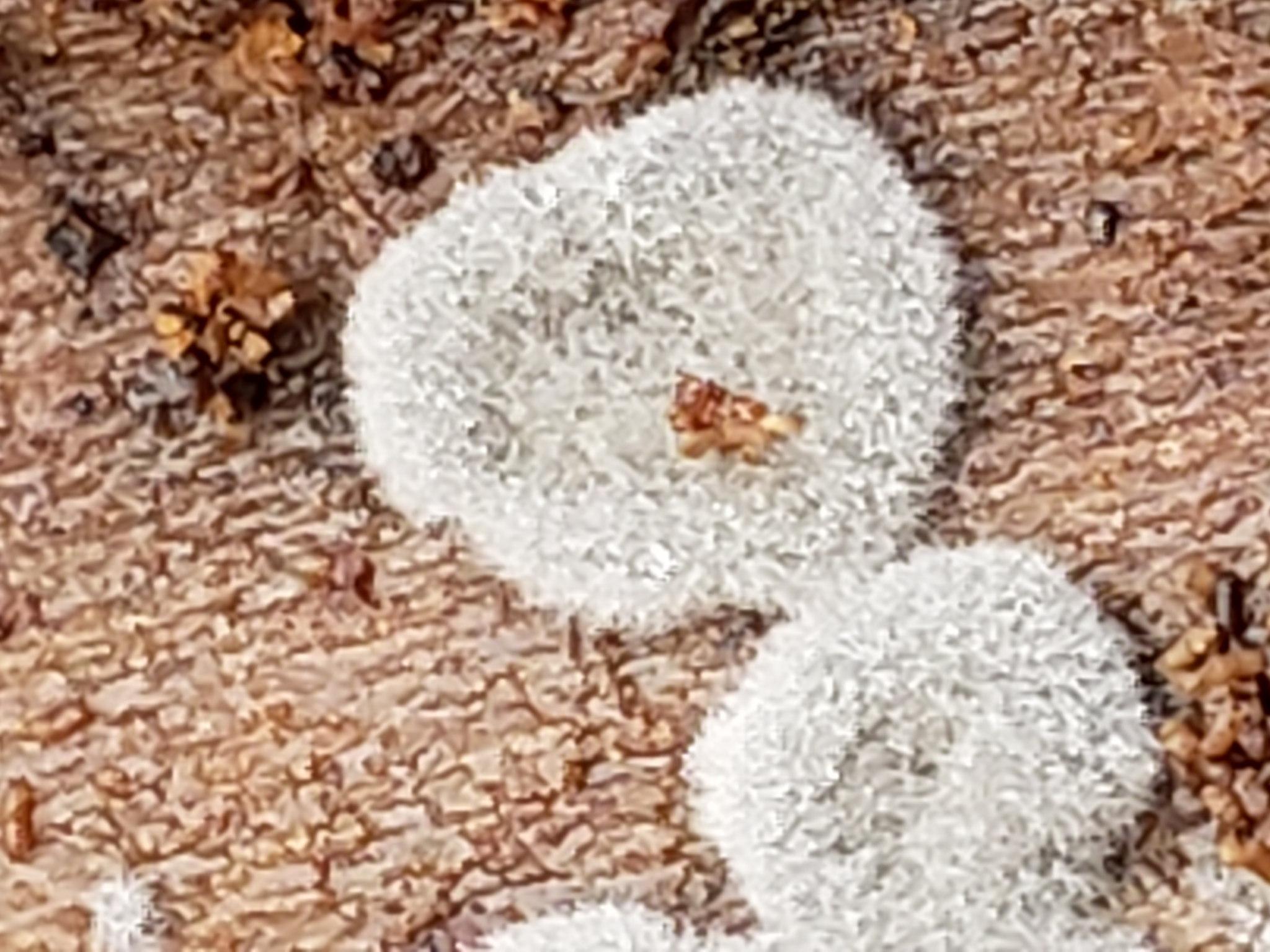
- Cirrenalia sp.

Scientific classification
- Kingdom: Fungi
- Division: Ascomycota
- Class: Sordariomycetes
- Order: Microascales
- Family: Halosphaeriaceae
- Genus: Halosarpheia; Kohlm. & E.Kohlm. (1977)

Type species
- Halosarpheia fibrosa Kohlm. & E.Kohlm. (1977)

= Halosarpheia =

Genus of fungi

Halosarpheia is a genus of fungi in the family Halosphaeriaceae. The genus contained 22 species in 2008, then several species were re-assigned to different genera, leaving eight species in 2023.

== Species ==
As accepted by Species Fungorum;

- Halosarpheia bentotensis Jørg. Koch (1982)
- Halosarpheia culmiperda Kohlm., Volkm.-Kohlm. & O.E. Erikss. (1995)
- Halosarpheia fibrosa Kohlm. & E. Kohlm. (1977)
- Halosarpheia japonica Abdel-Wahab & Nagah. (2012)
- Halosarpheia marina (Cribb & J.W. Cribb) Kohlm. (1984)
- Halosarpheia minuta W.F. Leong (1991)
- Halosarpheia phragmiticola Poon & K.D. Hyde (1998)
- Halosarpheia unicellularis Abdel-Wahab & E.B.G. Jones (2001)

Former species (all still in Halosphaeriaceae family;

- H. abonnis Kohlm. (1984) = Saagaromyces abonnis
- H. aquadulcis S.Y. Hsieh, H.S. Chang & E.B.G. Jones (1995) = Aniptodera aquadulcis
- H. aquatica K.D. Hyde (1992) = Ascosacculus aquaticus
- H. cincinnatula Shearer & J.L. Crane (1981) = Oceanitis cincinnatula
- H. heteroguttulata S.W. Wong, K.D. Hyde & E.B.G. Jones (1999) = Ascosacculus heteroguttulatus
- H. kandeliae Abdel-Wahab & E.B.G. Jones (1999) = Praelongicaulis kandeliae
- H. lotica Shearer (1984) = Natantispora lotica
- H. ratnagiriensis S.D. Patil & Borse (1982) = Saagaromyces ratnagiriensis
- H. retorquens Shearer & J.L. Crane (1981) = Natantispora retorquens
- H. spartinae (E.B.G. Jones) Shearer & J.L. Crane (1981) = Magnisphaera spartinae
- H. trullifera (Kohlm.) E.B.G. Jones, S.T. Moss & Cuomo (1983) = Remispora trullifera
- H. unicaudata (E.B.G. Jones & Camp.-Als.) R.G. Johnson, E.B.G. Jones & S.T. Moss (1987) = Oceanitis unicaudata
- H. unicaudata (E.B.G. Jones & Camp.-Als.) Kohlm. & Volkm.-Kohlm. (1991) = Oceanitis unicaudata
- H. viscidula (Kohlm. & E. Kohlm.) Shearer & J.L. Crane (1981) = Oceanitis viscidula
