= Magnisphaera =

Scientific classification
- Kingdom: Fungi
- Division: Ascomycota
- Class: Sordariomycetes
- Order: Microascales
- Family: Halosphaeriaceae
- Genus: Magnisphaera; J.Campb., J.L.Anderson & Shearer (2003)

Type species
- Magnisphaera spartinae (E.B.G.Jones) J.Campb., J.L.Anderson & Shearer (2003)

Species
- M. spartinae M. stevemossago

Genus of fungi

Magnisphaera is a genus of fungi in the family Halosphaeriaceae. The genus contains two species.
