= Trichomaris =

Scientific classification
- Kingdom: Fungi
- Division: Ascomycota
- Class: Sordariomycetes
- Order: Microascales
- Family: Halosphaeriaceae
- Genus: Trichomaris; Hibbits, Hughes & Sparks

Type species
- Trichomaris invadens Hibbits, G.C. Hughes & Sparks

Genus of fungi

Trichomaris is a genus of fungi in the family Halosphaeriaceae. This is a monotypic genus, containing the single species Trichomaris invadens. This fungus causes a disease of tanner crabs. It forms a layer of dark hyphae on the exoskeleton of affected hosts. Perithecia form atop this layer and produce ascospores with distinctive gelatinous appendages. The spores are presumably able to infect new hosts.
