= Canalisporium elegans =

Scientific classification
- Kingdom: Fungi
- Division: Ascomycota
- Class: Sordariomycetes
- Order: Savoryellales
- Family: Savoryellaceae
- Genus: Canalisporium
- Species: C. elegans

Binomial name
- Canalisporium elegans Nawawi, A. & Kuthub. (1989)

Species of fungus

Canalisporium elegans is a lignicolous fungus species in the genus Canalisporium found in Malaysia.
