= Thalespora =

Scientific classification
- Kingdom: Fungi
- Division: Ascomycota
- Class: Sordariomycetes
- Order: Microascales
- Family: Halosphaeriaceae
- Genus: Thalespora; Chatmala & E.B.G. Jones

Type species
- Thalespora appendiculata Chatmala & E.B.G. Jones

Genus of fungi

Thalespora is a genus of fungi in the family Halosphaeriaceae. This is a monotypic genus, containing the single species Thalespora appendiculata.
