= Natantispora =

Scientific classification
- Kingdom: Fungi
- Division: Ascomycota
- Class: Sordariomycetes
- Order: Microascales
- Family: Halosphaeriaceae
- Genus: Natantispora; J.Campb., J.L.Anderson & Shearer (2003)

Type species
- Natantispora retorquens (Shearer & J.L.Crane) J.Campb., J.L.Anderson & Shearer (2003)

Species
- N. lotica N. retorquens N. unipolaris

Genus of fungi

Natantispora is a genus of fungi in the family Halosphaeriaceae.
