= Fluviatispora =

Scientific classification
- Kingdom: Fungi
- Division: Ascomycota
- Class: Sordariomycetes
- Order: Microascales
- Family: Halosphaeriaceae
- Genus: Fluviatispora; K.D. Hyde

Type species
- Fluviatispora tunicata K.D. Hyde

Genus of fungi

Fluviatispora is a genus of fungi in the Halosphaeriaceae family. The genus contains three species.
