= Corollospora =

Scientific classification
- Kingdom: Fungi
- Division: Ascomycota
- Class: Sordariomycetes
- Order: Microascales
- Family: Halosphaeriaceae
- Genus: Corollospora; Werderm.

Type species
- Corollospora maritima Werderm.

Genus of fungi

Corollospora is a genus of fungi in the Halosphaeriaceae family. The genus contained 19 species in 2008, it increased to 29 species by 2023.

Corollospora maritima is a marine ascomycete species. While, arenicolous (living or burrowing in sand) ascomycete Corollospora cinnamomea was found on a beach in Puerto Rico.

== Species ==
As accepted by Species Fungorum;

- Corollospora anglusa Abdel-Wahab & Nagah. (2009)
- Corollospora angusta Nakagiri & Tokura (1988)
- Corollospora armoricana Kohlm. & Volkm.-Kohlm. (1989)
- Corollospora baravispora Steinke & E.B.G. Jones (2009)
- Corollospora besarispora Sundari (1996)
- Corollospora borealis S. Tibell (2016)
- Corollospora californica Kohlm. & Volkm.-Kohlm. (1997)
- Corollospora cinnamomea Jørg. Koch (1986)
- Corollospora colossus Nakagiri & Tokura (1988)
- Corollospora cristata (Kohlm.) Kohlm. (1962)
- Corollospora filiformis Nakagiri (1988)
- Corollospora fusca Nakagiri & Tokura (1988)
- Corollospora gracilis Nakagiri & Tokura (1988)
- Corollospora indica Prasannarai, Ananda & K.R. Sridhar (2000)
- Corollospora intermedia I. Schmidt (1970)
- Corollospora lacera (Linder) Kohlm. (1962)
- Corollospora luteola Nakagiri & Tubaki (1982)
- Corollospora marina (Haythorn & E.B.G. Jones) E.B.G. Jones, K.L. Pang & Abdel-Wahab (2016)
- Corollospora maritima Werderm. (1922)
- Corollospora mediterranea A. Poli, E. Bovio, G.C. Varese & V. Prigione (2021)
- Corollospora mesopotamica Al-Saadoon (2006)
- Corollospora novofusca Kohlm. & Volkm.-Kohlm. (1991)
- Corollospora parvula (Zuccaro, J.I. Mitch. & Nakagiri) E.B.G. Jones, K.L. Pang & Abdel-Wahab (2016)
- Corollospora portsaidica Abdel-Wahab & Nagah. (2009)
- Corollospora pseudopulchella Nakagiri & Tokura (1988)
- Corollospora pulchella Kohlm., I. Schmidt & N.B. Nair (1967)
- Corollospora quinqueseptata Nakagiri (1988)
- Corollospora ramulosa (Meyers & Kohlm.) E.B.G. Jones & Abdel-Wahab (2016)
- Corollospora trifurcata (Höhnk) Kohlm. (1962)

Former species;

- C. comata (Kohlm.) Kohlm. (1962) = Nereiospora comata, Halosphaeriaceae
- C. tubulata Kohlm. (1968) = Kohlmeyeriella tubulata, Lulworthiaceae
