= Nimbospora =

Scientific classification
- Kingdom: Fungi
- Division: Ascomycota
- Class: Sordariomycetes
- Order: Microascales
- Family: Halosphaeriaceae
- Genus: Nimbospora; Jørgen Koch

Type species
- Nimbospora effusa Jørg. Koch

Genus of fungi

Nimbospora is a genus of fungi in the family Halosphaeriaceae. The genus contains three species.
