= Remispora =

Scientific classification
- Kingdom: Fungi
- Division: Ascomycota
- Class: Sordariomycetes
- Order: Microascales
- Family: Halosphaeriaceae
- Genus: Remispora; Linder

Type species
- Remispora maritima Linder

Genus of fungi

Remispora is a genus of fungi in the family Halosphaeriaceae. The genus contains six species.
