= Carbosphaerella =

Scientific classification
- Kingdom: Fungi
- Division: Ascomycota
- Class: Sordariomycetes
- Order: Microascales
- Family: Halosphaeriaceae
- Genus: Carbosphaerella; I. Schmidt

Type species
- Carbosphaerella pleosporoides I. Schmidt

Genus of fungi

Carbosphaerella is a genus of fungi in the Halosphaeriaceae family. The genus contains two species.
