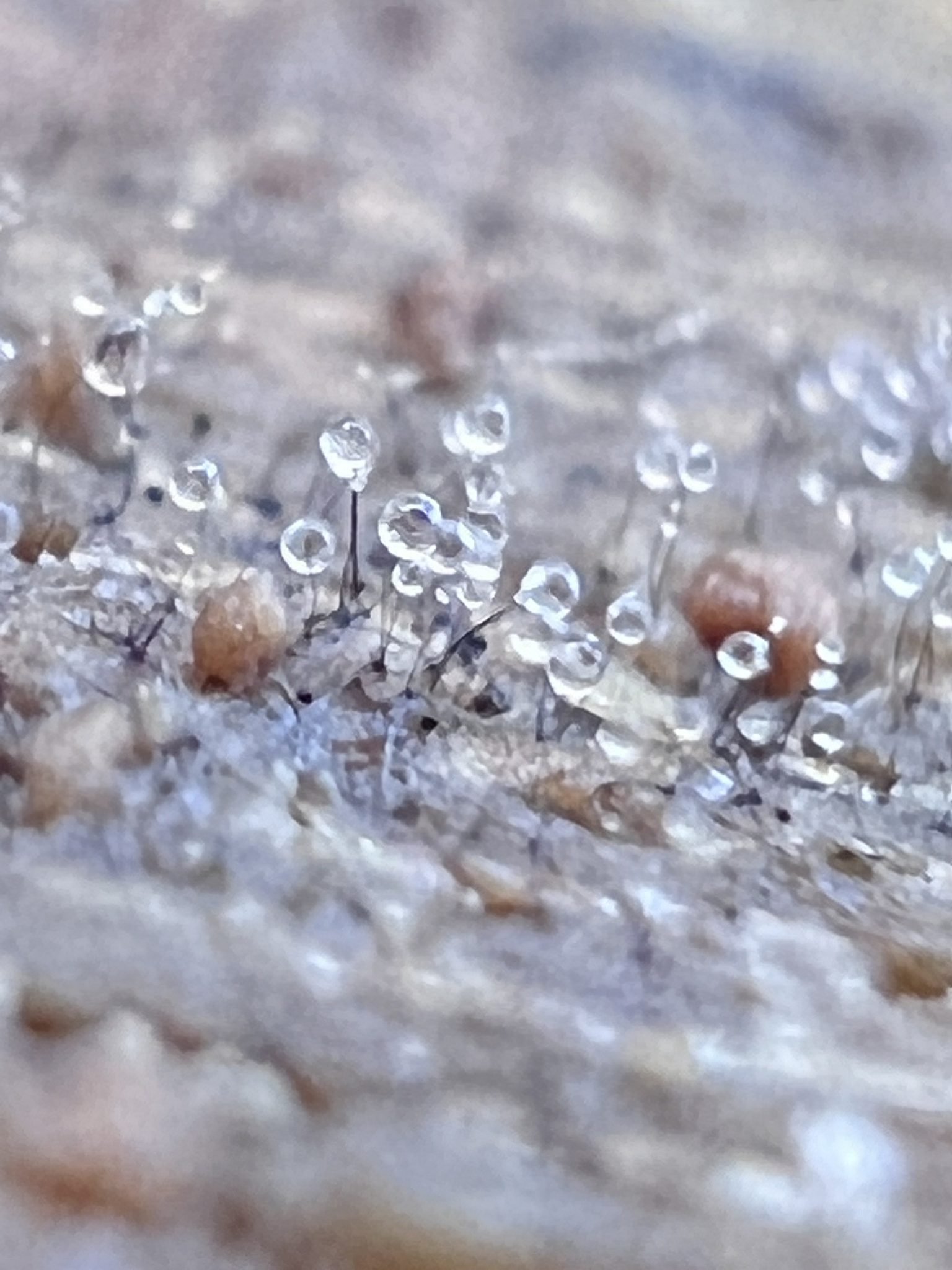
- Pleurothecium recurvatum

Scientific classification
- Kingdom: Fungi
- Division: Ascomycota
- Class: Sordariomycetes
- Order: Pleurotheciales
- Family: Pleurotheciaceae
- Genus: Pleurothecium; Höhn.

Type species
- Pleurothecium recurvatum Höhn.

= Pleurothecium =

Genus of fungi

Pleurothecium is a genus of terrestrial and freshwater fungi in the family Pleurotheciaceae. It is typified by Pleurothecium recurvatum as the type species (Morgan) Höhn, which has the synonym of Carpoligna pleurothecii F.A. Fernández & Huhndorf, Mycologia 9: 253. 1999.

== History ==
Fernández et al. (1999) established Carpoligna with the sexual stage of Carpoligna pleurothecii as the type species and sporulated asexual stage from culture, which was physically linked to Pleurothecium recurvatum. Réblová et al. (2016) proposed to adopt Pleurothecium over Carpoligna (Art. F.8.1, Shenzhen code). Thus, Carpoligna pleurothecii was then regarded as a synonym to Pleurothecium recurvatum.

Based on morphological and molecular data, species Pleurotheciella was found to be closely related to the genera Pleurothecium and Sterigmatobotrys in 2012. This was before the creation of the family Pleurotheciaceae in 2015.

A key to the various species of Pleurothecium was provided by Monteiro et al. (2016).

== Description ==
Pleurothecium species are characterized by astromatic, semi-immersed to superficial, dark brown, venter subglobose to conical perithecia, with a papilla or short beak. They are sometimes lying toward the host, with or without setae (bristles), sparse or abundant, septate (having septa; divided by partitions), hyaline (transparent) paraphyses (sterile upward-growing, basally-attached hypha), unitunicate (single walled), cylindrical-clavate (club) shaped. They have a short-stipitate asci with a distinct, J-apical ring and hyaline (glass-like), 3-septate, ellipsoidal to fusiform ascospores without mucilaginous sheath or appendages. The asexual morphs have distinct brown conidiophores (conidia, which are borne on specialized stalks) and polyblastic, sympodially denticulate (having teeth-like structures) conidiogenous cells. It also has solitary, unicellular or septate, cylindrical, ellipsoidal, fusiform or clavate conidia, straight or slightly curved (Wu & Zhang 2009, Réblová et al. 2012, Luo et al. 2018,).

== Distribution and habitats ==
It has a scattered distribution, including places such as China and Thailand, Taiwan, North America, South America (including Brazil,), parts of Europe (including the United Kingdom,) Australia, and also New Zealand.

They are found in terrestrial (soils,) and freshwater habits, on submerged leaves and wood.

== Species ==
12 species are accepted by Species Fungorum;

- Pleurothecium aquaticum Z.L. Luo, H.Y. Su & K.D. Hyde (2018)
- Pleurothecium aquisubtropicum J. Ma, Y.Z. Lu & K.D. Hyde (2023)
- Pleurothecium bicoloratum R.F. Castañeda, J.S. Monteiro & Gusmão (2016)
- Pleurothecium clavatum Y.M. Wu & T.Y. Zhang (2009)
- Pleurothecium floriforme Jing Yang & K.D. Hyde (2017)
- Pleurothecium guttulatum H. Yang, K.D. Hyde & H. Zhang (2021)
- Pleurothecium magnum Subram. & Bhat (1989)
- Pleurothecium malayense K. Matsush. & Matsush. (1996)
- Pleurothecium obovoideum (Matsush.) Arzanlou & Crous (2007)
- Pleurothecium pulneyense Subram. & Bhat (1989)
- Pleurothecium recurvatum (Morgan) Höhn. (1923)
- Pleurothecium semifecundum Réblová, Seifert & J. Fourn. (2012)

Former species;

- P. leptospermi J.A. Cooper (2005) = Anapleurothecium leptospermi, Pleurotheciaceae

== Other sources ==
- Goos RD (1969) The genus Pleurothecium. Mycologia 61:1048–1053
