= Panorbis =

Scientific classification
- Kingdom: Fungi
- Division: Ascomycota
- Class: Sordariomycetes
- Order: Microascales
- Family: Halosphaeriaceae
- Genus: Panorbis; J. Campb., J.L. Anderson & Shearer

Type species
- Panorbis viscosus (I. Schmidt) J. Campb., J.L. Anderson & Shearer

Genus of fungi

Panorbis is a genus of fungi in the family Halosphaeriaceae. This is a monotypic genus, containing the single species Panorbis viscosus.
