= Faurelina =

Scientific classification
- Kingdom: Fungi
- Division: Ascomycota
- Class: Sordariomycetes
- Order: Microascales
- Family: Chadefaudiellaceae
- Genus: Faurelina; Locq.-Lin.

Genus of fungi

Faurelina is a genus of fungi in the family Chadefaudiellaceae.

== Species ==
As accepted by Species Fungorum;

- Faurelina elongata (Udagawa & Furuya) Furuya (1978)
- Faurelina fimigena Locq.-Lin. (1975)
- Faurelina hispanica Valldos. & Guarro (1987)
- Faurelina indica Arx, Mukerji & N. Singh (1981)
