= Halosphaeria =

Scientific classification
- Kingdom: Fungi
- Division: Ascomycota
- Class: Sordariomycetes
- Order: Microascales
- Family: Halosphaeriaceae
- Genus: Halosphaeria; Linder (1944)

Type species
- Halosphaeria appendiculata Linder (1944)

Genus of fungi

Halosphaeria is a genus of fungi in the family Halosphaeriaceae. The genus contains four species.
