= Antennospora =

Scientific classification
- Kingdom: Fungi
- Division: Ascomycota
- Class: Sordariomycetes
- Order: Microascales
- Family: Halosphaeriaceae
- Genus: Antennospora; Meyers

Type species
- Antennospora caribbea Meyers

Genus of fungi

Antennospora is a genus of fungi in the Halosphaeriaceae family. The genus contains two species.
