= Ophiodeira =

Scientific classification
- Kingdom: Fungi
- Division: Ascomycota
- Class: Sordariomycetes
- Order: Microascales
- Family: Halosphaeriaceae
- Genus: Ophiodeira; Kohlm. & Volkm.-Kohlm. (1988)

Type species
- Ophiodeira monosemeia Kohlm. & Volkm.-Kohlm. (1988)

Genus of fungi

Ophiodeira is a genus of fungi in the family Halosphaeriaceae. This is a monotypic genus, containing the single species Ophiodeira monosemeia.
