= Marinospora =

Scientific classification
- Kingdom: Fungi
- Division: Ascomycota
- Class: Sordariomycetes
- Order: Microascales
- Family: Halosphaeriaceae
- Genus: Marinospora; A.R. Caval.

Type species
- Marinospora calyptrata (Kohlm.) A.R. Caval.

Genus of fungi

Marinospora is a genus of fungi in the family Halosphaeriaceae. The genus contains three species.
