= Halosphaeriopsis =

Scientific classification
- Kingdom: Fungi
- Division: Ascomycota
- Class: Sordariomycetes
- Order: Microascales
- Family: Halosphaeriaceae
- Genus: Halosphaeriopsis; T.W.Johnson (1958)

Type species
- Halosphaeriopsis mediosetigera (Cribb & J.W.Cribb) T.W.Johnson (1958)

Synonyms
- Halosphaeria mediosetigera Cribb & J.W. Cribb, Pap. Dept. Bot. (formerly Biol.) Univ. Qd. 3: 100 (1956); Halosphaeria mediosetigera var. grandispora Kohlm., Nova Hedwigia 2: 310 (1960); Culcitalna achraspora Meyers & R.T. Moore, Am. J. Bot. 47: 349 (1960); Trichocladium achrasporum (Meyers & R.T. Moore) M. Dixon, Trans. Br. mycol. Soc. 51(1): 163 (1968); Trichocladium achrasporum (Meyers & R.T. Moore) M. Dixon ex Shearer & J.L. Crane, Mycologia 63(2): 244 (1971)

Genus of fungi

Halosphaeriopsis is a fungal genus in the family Halosphaeriaceae. This is a monotypic genus, containing the single species Halosphaeriopsis mediosetigera.
