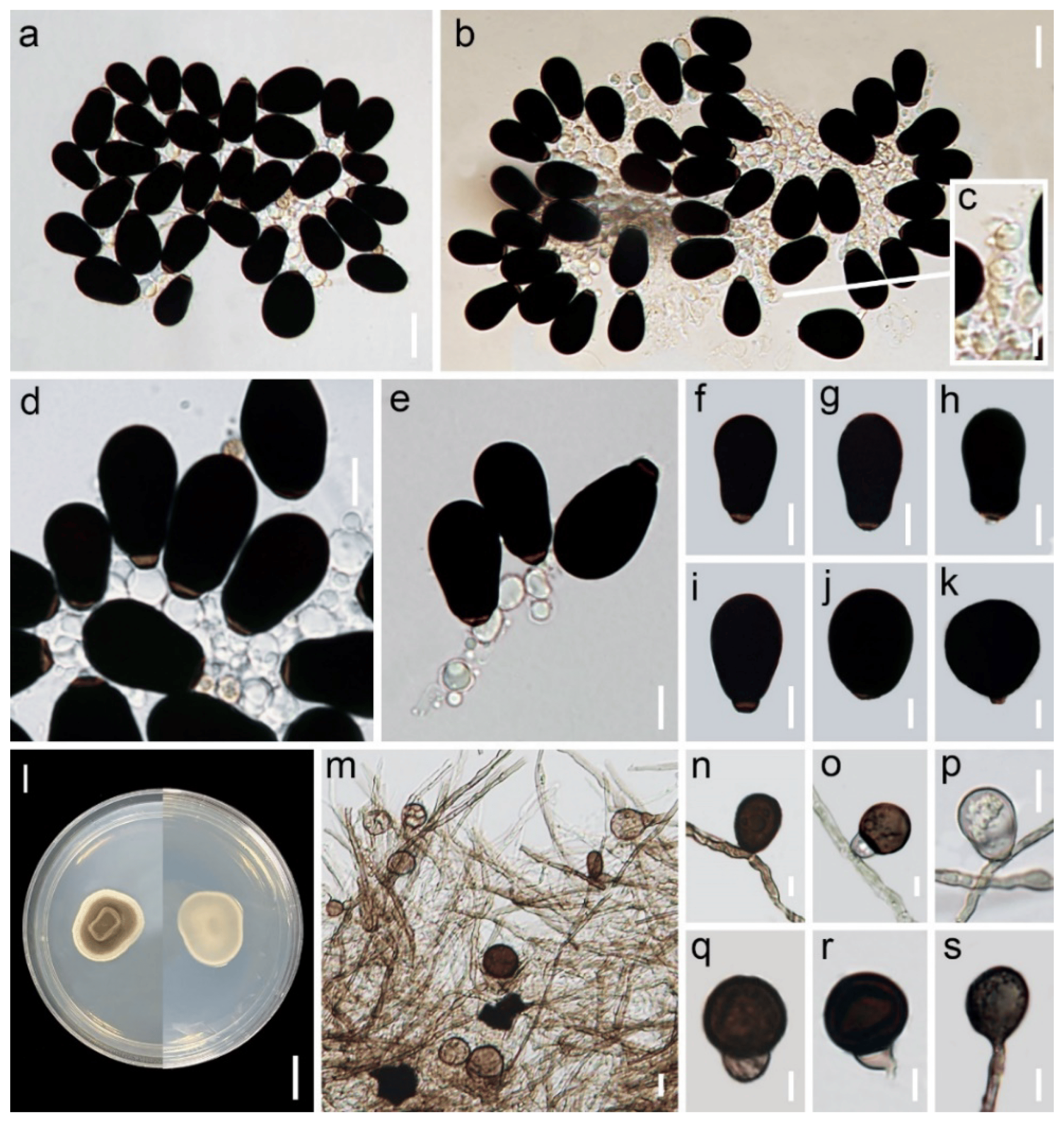
- Parafuscosporella obovata

Scientific classification
- Kingdom: Fungi
- Division: Ascomycota
- Class: Sordariomycetes
- Subclass: Hypocreomycetidae
- Order: Fuscosporellales; Jing Yang, Bhat & K.D. Hyde
- Family: Fuscosporellaceae; Jing Yang, Bhat & K.D. Hyde

= Fuscosporellaceae =

Order of fungi

Fuscosporellales is an order of fungi within the division Ascomycota, subdivision Pezizomycotina and class Sordariomycetes.

It contains a single family, Fuscosporellaceae, with genera (with amount of species); Bactrodesmiastrum Hol.-Jech. (5), Fuscosporella J. Yang (2), Mucispora J. Yang (2), Parafuscosporella J. Yang & K.D. Hyde (3), Plagiascoma Réblová & J. Fourn. (1 - Plagiascoma frondosum) and Pseudoascotaiwania Jing Yang, Bhat & K.D. Hyde (1 - Pseudoascotaiwania persoonii).

== History ==
The monotypic order Fuscosporellales was introduced by Yang et al. in 2016, with Fuscosporellaceae as the type family, based on phylogenetic analyses, and six genera were assigned to the family, viz. Bactrodesmiastrum, Fuscosporella (type genus), Mucispora, Parafuscosporella, Plagiascoma, and Pseudoascotaiwania.

Phylogenetic analyses of combined LSU, SSU and RPB2 sequence data place these hitherto unidentified taxa close to Ascotaiwania and Bactrodesmiastrum. A robust clade containing a new combination Pseudoascotaiwania persoonii, Bactrodesmiastrum species, Plagiascoma frondosum and three new species, were then introduced into the new order of Fuscosporellales (in subclass Hypocreomycetidae, and class Sordariomycetes,). A sister relationship for Fuscosporellales with Conioscyphales, Pleurotheciales and Savoryellales was strongly supported by sequence data.

Taxonomic novelties introduced in Fuscosporellales was four monotypic genera, viz. Fuscosporella, Mucispora, Parafuscosporella and Pseudoascotaiwania. Earlier, Bactrodesmiastrum and Plagiascoma were originally placed in Sordariomycetes genera incertae sedis. The divergence time for Fuscosporellales has been estimated as 190 MYA (million years ago).

Parafuscosporella moniliformis and Parafuscosporella mucosa, were later identified as the type and second species in their genus, respectively.

Fuscosporellales and Savoryellales were initially placed in Hypocreomycetidae (Sordariomycetes), but later, based on the phylogenetic and molecular clock analyses, they were referred to as a new subclass of Savoryellomycetidae (Sordariomycetes) along with Conioscyphales and Pleurotheciales by Hongsanan et al.

== Description ==
Plagiascoma and Pseudoascotaiwania are known for their sexual morphs, which have immersed to semi-immersed, dark brown to black ascomata, unitunicate, cylindrical to cylindrical-fusiform (having a spindle-like shape), stipitate, 8-spored asci with a non-amyloid apical ring, and uniseriate (unbranched), hyaline (transparent/glassy-like) or light brown, fusiform, septate ascospores. Asexual genera Bactrodesmiastrum, Fuscosporella, and Parafuscosporella, all share the features of having sporodochial (cushion-shaped masses) conidiomata which is semi-macronematous to macronematous (having a morphologically different conidiophore from the vegetative hyphae), hyaline to brown, smooth-walled conidiophores, monoblastic, integrated, hyaline to dark brown conidiogenous cells and ellipsoidal shaped, obovoid (egg-shaped) to pyriform (pear-shaped), brown to dark brown, septate conidia. While in comparison, Mucispora is distinct in having macronematous, mononematous, solitary, erect, brown shaded conidiophores. That are usually elongating percurrently (running through the entire length), and ellipsoidal to obovoid conidia, sometimes with a hyaline mucilaginous (producing thick, gluey substance) sheath.

== Distribution and habitat ==
It has a scattered distribution worldwide, it has been found in South America, parts of North America, Europe (including Spain,), Africa, Asia (including Thailand, and China,) and Australia.

Asexual morphs of freshwater fungi have been mostly reported from tropical and subtropical regions. Such as species in Fuscosporella and Mucispora have been reported from freshwater habitats in Thailand and China. Also, two species of Parafuscosporella were isolated from unidentified submerged twigs in a freshwater stream of Prachuap Khiri Khan Province, Thailand.
