= Conioscyphales =

Scientific classification
- Kingdom: Fungi
- Division: Ascomycota
- Class: Sordariomycetes
- Order: Conioscyphales Réblová & Seifert, Persoonia 37: 63, 2015
- Family: Conioscyphaceae Réblová & Seifert, Persoonia 37: 63, 2015

Order of fungi

Conioscyphales is an order of freshwater and terrestrial fungi within the division Ascomycota. It is in the subclass Savoryellomycetidae and the class Sordariomycetes and the subdivision of Pezizomycotina.

It only contains the monotypic family Conioscyphaceae and the genus Conioscypha (which has 18 species).

It was formerly in subclass Hypocreomycetidae O.E. Erikss. & Winka 1997, until 2017, when it was placed in subclass Savoryellomycetidae Hongsanan et al. Although still located within class Sordariomycetes.

The Conioscypha clade, based on molecular data, was considered as Ascomycota incertae sedis with Conioscypha and Conioscyphascus considered congeneric (Réblová and Seifert, 2004, Zelski et al., 2015) with Conioscypha accepted as the recommend name under the one name protocol (Réblová et al. 2016a).

In 2016, phylogenetic analyses of DNA sequences from nuclear ribosomal and protein-coding loci support the placement of several perithecial ascomycetes and dematiaceous hyphomycetes from freshwater and terrestrial environments in two monophyletic clades closely related to the Savoryellales. In the analysis, clade 45 represents the order Conioscyphales, which was established by Réblová et al. (2016a), with a single family Conioscyphaceae. They also introduced two new species, Conioscypha aquatica and Conioscypha submersa. It is a sister clade to orders Pleurotheciales and Savoryellales.

== Description ==
Conioscypha (the sole genus in the Conioscyphales) is generally characterised by aseptate, dark brown conidia and a unique mode of blastic conidiogenesis, when conidia are born in cyathiform (in the form of a cup, a little widened at the top) to doliiform (shaped like a barrel or cask) blastic conidiogenous cells surrounded by hyaline (transparent), cup-like collarettes with a multilamellar (having (or affecting) multiple lamellae) structure (Shearer & Motta 1973).

== Distribution ==
It has a cosmopolitan distribution across the globe. They have been found in South America, Australia and New Zealand, as well as parts of North America, Europe and Africa.
