= Ascotaiwania =

Scientific classification
- Kingdom: Fungi
- Division: Ascomycota
- Class: Sordariomycetes
- Order: Savoryellales
- Family: Savoryellaceae
- Genus: Ascotaiwania; Sivan. & H.S.Chang (1992)

Type species
- Ascotaiwania lignicola Sivan. & H.S.Chang (1992)

Genus of fungi

Ascotaiwania is a genus of fungi in the Sordariomycetes class (subclass Sordariomycetidae) of the Ascomycota. In 2020, it was placed in the order Savoryellales and family of Savoryellaceae.

Ascotaiwania persoonii and A. hughesii have been found in North America found on decorticated wood in lotic and lentic habitats.

== Species ==
As accepted by Species Fungorum;

- Ascotaiwania hsilio H.S. Chang & S.Y. Hsieh (1998)
- Ascotaiwania latericolla Réblová, Hern.-Restr. & J. Fourn. (2020)
- Ascotaiwania licualae J. Fröhl. & K.D. Hyde (2000)
- Ascotaiwania lignicola Sivan. & H.S. Chang (1992)
- Ascotaiwania mauritiana Dulym., P.F. Cannon, K.D. Hyde & Peerally (2001)
- Ascotaiwania mitriformis Ranghoo & K.D. Hyde (1998)
- Ascotaiwania pallida K.D. Hyde & Goh (1999)
- Ascotaiwania palmicola K.D. Hyde (1995)
- Ascotaiwania pennisetorum M.K.M. Wong & K.D. Hyde (2001)
- Ascotaiwania sawadae H.S. Chang & S.Y. Hsieh (1998)
- Ascotaiwania wulai H.S. Chang & S.Y. Hsieh (1998)

Former species;

- A. fusiformis Jing Yang, Bhat & K.D. Hyde (2016) = Neoascotaiwania fusiformis, Sordariomycetidae
- A. hughesii Fallah, J.L. Crane & Shearer (1999) = Helicoascotaiwania hughesii, Pleurotheciaceae
- A. limnetica (H.S. Chang & S.Y. Hsieh) Réblová & J. Fourn. (2015) = Neoascotaiwania limnetica, Sordariomycetidae
- A. persoonii Fallah, J.L. Crane & Shearer (1999) = Pseudoascotaiwania persoonii, Fuscosporellales
- A. terrestris (Hern.-Restr., R.F. Castañeda & Guarro) Dayar. & K.D. Hyde (2019) = Neoascotaiwania terrestris, Sordariomycetidae
