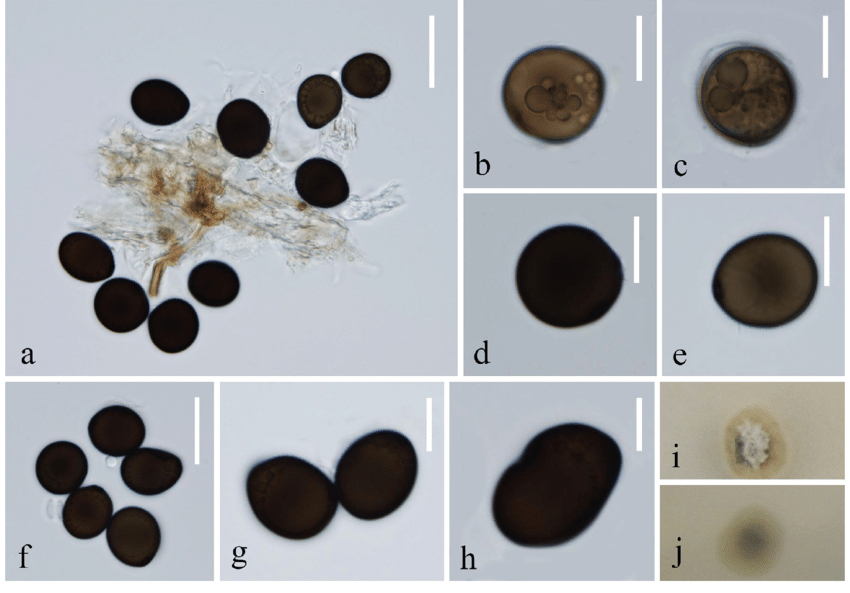
- Conioscypha submersa

Scientific classification
- Kingdom: Fungi
- Division: Ascomycota
- Class: Sordariomycetes
- Order: Conioscyphales
- Family: Conioscyphaceae
- Genus: Conioscypha Höhn.

Type species
- Conioscypha lignicola Höhn.

= Conioscypha =

Genus of fungi

Conioscypha is a genus of terrestrial and freshwater fungi in the monotypic family Conioscyphaceae and the monotypic order Conioscyphales. They are found on decayed wood, leaves, or bamboo stems. Except for Conioscypha japonica which was isolated from dog skin fragments and hair in 2017.

== History ==
Austrian mycologist and lichenologist Franz Xaver Rudolf von Höhnel (1852–1920) in 1904, created the genus Conioscypha with Conioscypha lignicola Höhn. as the generic type, which was found on submerged wood of Carpinus sp. in Austria.

Then in 1973, American mycologist Carol A.Shearer reviewed and re-described Conioscypha lignicola based on type specimens together with a new of species Conioscypha varia Shearer which was found on 2 balsa wood blocks submerged in the Patuxent River, Maryland, USA.

Later, nine more Conioscypha species were recognized: Conioscypha bambusicola Matsush. (Matsushima 1975), Conioscypha japonica Udagawa & Toyaz. (Udagawa and Toyazaki 1983), Conioscypha hoehnelii P.M. Kirk (Kirk 1984), Conioscypha fabiformis Matsush. (Matsushima 1993), Conioscypha dimorpha Matsush. (Matsushima 1996), Conioscypha taiwaniana J.L. Chen & Tzean (Chen and Tzean 2000), Conioscypha minutispora Hern.-Restr., Gené & Guarro (Crous et al. 2014), while Zelski et al. (2015) described Conioscypha peruensis Zelski, Raja, A.N. Mill. & Shearer, and Conioscypha gracilis (Munk) Zelski, Raja, A.N. Mill. & Shearer, with their sexual morphs. Most of the previously described species of Conioscypha were described and reported from decaying plant materials (i.e., dead wood, bamboo and leaves) derived from terrestrial and aquatic habitats. Conioscypha japonica was isolated from skin scrapings and hair of a male dog (Udagawa and Toyazaki 1983).

In 2004, the genus Conioscyphascus was introduced based on Conioscyphascus varius Réblová & Seifert, it was named as the sexual morph of Conioscypha varia (Réblová and Seifert 2004).

The Conioscypha clade, based on molecular data, was considered as Ascomycota incertae sedis with genera Conioscypha and Conioscyphascus considered congeneric (Réblová and Seifert, 2004, Zelski et al., 2015) with Conioscypha accepted as the recommend name under the one name protocol (Réblová et al. 2016a). According to recent changes in the ICN (McNeill et al. 2012), specifically the new article 59.1, as of January 2013,

Then in a phylogenetic study of the Hypocreomycetidae, Sordariomycetes, Conioscyphales was then proposed as a new order and it was closely related to the Savoryellales order (Boonyuen et al., 2011, Réblová et al., 2012, Réblová et al., 2016b).

Based on in vitro experiments and molecular DNA data, Réblová & Seifert (2004a) introduced Conioscyphascus, typified by Ca. varius, to accommodate holomorphs with Conioscypha asexual morphs. Another sexual-asexual relationship was established for C. peruviana (Zelski et al. 2015). Following the abolishment of dual nomenclature and adoption of one fungus, one name, Conioscyphascus was accepted as a synonym of Conioscypha (Zelski et al. 2015, Réblová et al. 2016c). Although C. gracilis is the only species of the genus known in its sexual state, the presence of typical conidia on the host near ascomata was repeatedly observed (Réblová & Seifert 2004a, Zelski et al. 2015). Conioscypha varia Shearer is illustrated for the sexual morph and C. tenebrosa is illustrated for the asexual morph, in this entry.

== Description ==
The fungal genus is characterized dematiaceous (black yeast), unicellular, thick-walled, globose to subglobose shaped conidia produced from discrete, hyaline (transparent), 'cup-shaped' conidiogenous cells which proliferate per currently, and are lacking conidiophores (conidia, which are borne on specialized stalks).

They have an unusual mode of conidiogenesis which includes aspects of both phialidic (A type of conidiogenous cell, bottle-shaped, that produces blastic conidia (phialospores) in basipetal succession) and annellidic (the conidiogenous cell (also called an annellide) produces a basipetal sequence of conidia called annelloconidia or annellospores) ontogeny (Shearer 1973, Shearer & Motta 1973, Cole & Samson 1979,).

Conioscypha is characterized by a unique mode of conidiogenesis with blastic conidia produced at inconspicuous loci along the hyphae (Shearer 1973). Traditionally, the conidia were thought to be produced from 'phialidic' conidiogenous cells (Goh & Hyde 1998). Shearer & Motta (1973) described Conioscypha conidiogenesis to be both 'phialidic' and 'annelidic' (Shearer & Motta 1973), but Minter et al. (1983) did not agree with this observation. Cole & Samson (1979) reported conidial development to be intermediate between the 'phialidic' and 'annelidic' process and after repetitive basipetal conidial secession, the remains of the outer wall of conidia collect centripetally on the conidiogenous cells to form 'collarettes'.

Conidiogenesis occurs at inconspicuous loci along hyphae; a basipetal (chain of conidia in which new spores are formed at the base) succession of blastically produced conidia leave behind conspicuous collarettes that are remnants of the initial outer wall of the conidia; these accumulate centripetally to form a multi-layered collarette appearing similar to annellations (Goh & Hyde 1998).

== Distribution and habitats ==
It has a cosmopolitan distribution, worldwide. Including places such as Peru, America (including Chesapeake Bay,) the British Isles, Spain, China, Japan, Thailand, and Taiwan.

Such as; Conioscypha hoehnelii was found on bark of Eucalyptus sp. as well as the wood, and leaves of Phormium tenax J. R. & G. Forst (Agavaceae) collected in the British Isles. Also Conioscypha peruviana was isolated from submerged woody debris collected in streams, rivers and a swamp in Peru. Conioscypha varia has been found in indoor environments, while Conioscypha minutispora has been found on dead wood in Spain. Conioscypha pleiomorpha, is commonly found in association with decaying wood substrates, and might preferentially degrade lignin-enriched organic material.

== Species ==
There was 16 morphological species (described by Liu et al. 2019b) in 2019. Then 18 species, as accepted by Species Fungorum;

- Conioscypha aquatica Z.L. Luo, K.D. Hyde & H.Y. Su (2019)
- Conioscypha bambusicola Matsush. (1975)
- Conioscypha boutwelliae Hern.-Rest. (2018)
- Conioscypha dimorpha Matsush. (1996)
- Conioscypha fabiformis Matsush. (1993)
- Conioscypha gracilis (Munk) Zelski, Raja, A.N. Mill. & Shearer (2014)
- Conioscypha hoehnelii P.M. Kirk (1984)
- Conioscypha japonica Udagawa & Toyaz. (1983)
- Conioscypha lignicola Höhn. (1904)
- Conioscypha minutispora Hern.-Restr., Gené & Guarro (2014)
- Conioscypha nakagirii Chuas., Somrith., Suetrong & Boonyuen (2017)
- Conioscypha peruviana Zelski, Raja, A.N. Mill. & Shearer (2015)
- Conioscypha pleiomorpha Hern.-Restr., R.F. Castañeda & Gené (2017)
- Conioscypha submersa Z.L. Luo, K.D. Hyde & H.Y. Su (2019)
- Conioscypha taiwaniana J.L. Chen & Tzean (2000)
- Conioscypha tenebrosa N.G. Liu, K.D. Hyde & J.K. Liu (2019)
- Conioscypha varia Shearer (1973)
- Conioscypha verrucosa J. Yang & K.D. Hyde (2020)

Former species;

- C. gracilis (Munk) Réblová & Seifert (2004) = Conioscypha gracilis, Conioscyphaceae
- C. varius Réblová & Seifert (2004) = Conioscypha varia, Conioscyphaceae
