= Fuscosporella =

Scientific classification
- Kingdom: Fungi
- Division: Ascomycota
- Class: Sordariomycetes
- Order: Fuscosporellales
- Family: Fuscosporellaceae
- Genus: Fuscosporella; Jing Yang, Bhat & K.D. Hyde, Cryptogamie, Mycologie 37 (4), 449-475, (1 December 2016)

Type species
- Fuscosporella pyriformis Jing Yang, Bhat & K.D. Hyde

Genus of fungi

Fuscosporella is a genus of terrestrial and freshwater fungi in the family Fuscosporellaceae and within the monotypic order of Fuscosporellales.

== Etymology ==
The word Fuscosporella is derived from the Latin word -fusco, meaning dark and the Greek word spore meaning “seed, sowing”.

== History ==
Fuscosporella was originally established as a monotypic genus for Fuscosporella pyriformis J. Yang, J. Bhat & K.D. Hyde, and it is the type genus of Fuscosporellaceae (Yang et al. 2016). Fuscosporella pyriformis is morphologically similar to Parafuscosprella moniliformis J. Yang, J. Bhat & K.D. Hyde and Parafuscosprella mucosa J. Yang, J. Bhat & K.D. Hyde, as they share characters such as uniseptate (having a single cell wall), dark brown, obvoid (egg-shaped and solid, with the narrow end at the base) to obpyriform (shaped like that of a pear, with the base at the narrower end) conidia of similar size, and hyaline (glassy/transparent), vesicular (bladder-like sac) conidiogenous cells. Parafuscosporella garethii Boonyuen, Chuaseehar. & Somrith. is significantly different from the species in its obpyramidal conidia, which are coronate at the apex with unusual conical projections (Boonyuen et al. 2016). However, molecular evidence later gave a precise classification.

== Species ==
3 species are accepted by Species Fungorum;

- Fuscosporella aquatica J. Yang & K.D. Hyde (2017)
- Fuscosporella atrobrunnea L.L. Liu, J. Yang & Z.Y. Liu (2023)
- Fuscosporella pyriformis Jing Yang, Bhat & K.D. Hyde (2016)

Fuscosporella xingyiensis was published in 2022, but not yet fully accepted.

== Distribution ==
It has been only found in a few places worldwide, such as; off the coast of south America, in central Asia, in Thailand and China.

Species in Fuscosporella and Mucispora are reported from freshwater habitats in Thailand and China,
