= Lautisporopsis =

Scientific classification
- Kingdom: Fungi
- Division: Ascomycota
- Class: Sordariomycetes
- Order: Microascales
- Family: Halosphaeriaceae
- Genus: Lautisporopsis; E.B.G.Jones, Yousoff & S.T.Moss (1998)

Type species
- Lautisporopsis circumvestita (Kohlm.) E.B.G.Jones, Yusoff & S.T.Moss (1998)

Genus of fungi

Lautisporopsis is a fungal genus in the family Halosphaeriaceae. This is a monotypic genus, containing the single species Lautisporopsis circumvestita.
