= Aniptodera =

Scientific classification
- Kingdom: Fungi
- Division: Ascomycota
- Class: Sordariomycetes
- Order: Microascales
- Family: Halosphaeriaceae
- Genus: Aniptodera; Shearer & M. Miller

Type species
- Aniptodera chesapeakensis Shearer & M.A. Mill.

Genus of fungi

Aniptodera is a genus of fungi in the Halosphaeriaceae family. The genus contained nine species in 2008, by 2023 it had increased to 19 species.

Aniptodera salsuginosa and other fungi genera have been found in intertidal mangrove forests within Thailand.

== Species ==
As accepted by Species Fungorum;

- Aniptodera aquadulcis (S.Y. Hsieh, H.S. Chang & E.B.G. Jones) J. Campb., J.L. Anderson & Shearer (2003)
- Aniptodera aquibella Jiao Yang & K.D. Hyde (2016)
- Aniptodera chesapeakensis Shearer & M.A. Mill. (1977)
- Aniptodera fusiformis Shearer (1989)
- Aniptodera haispora Vrijmoed, K.D. Hyde & E.B.G. Jones (1994)
- Aniptodera inflatiascigera C.K.M. Tsui, K.D. Hyde & Hodgkiss (1997)
- Aniptodera intermedia K.D. Hyde & Alias (1999)
- Aniptodera juncicola Volkm.-Kohlm. & Kohlm. (1994)
- Aniptodera lignicola K.D. Hyde, W.H. Ho & C.K.M. Tsui (1999)
- Aniptodera limnetica Shearer (1989)
- Aniptodera mangrovei K.D. Hyde (1986)
- Aniptodera margarition Shearer (1989)
- Aniptodera mauritaniensis K.D. Hyde, W.H. Ho & C.K.M. Tsui (1999)
- Aniptodera megaloascocarpa Raja & Shearer (2008)
- Aniptodera megalospora K.D. Hyde, W.H. Ho & C.K.M. Tsui (1999)
- Aniptodera nypae K.D. Hyde (1994)
- Aniptodera palmicola K.D. Hyde, W.H. Ho & C.K.M. Tsui (1999)
- Aniptodera salsuginosa Nakagiri & Tad. Ito (1994)
- Aniptodera triseptata K.D. Hyde (2002)

Former species (all in Halosphaeriaceae family);

- A. lignatilis K.D. Hyde (1992) = Aniptosporopsis lignatilis
- A. longispora K.D. Hyde (1990) = Paraaniptodera longispora
