= Chadefaudiellaceae =

Scientific classification
- Domain: Eukaryota
- Kingdom: Fungi
- Division: Ascomycota
- Class: Sordariomycetes
- Order: Microascales
- Family: Chadefaudiellaceae; Faurel & Schotter ex Benny & Kimbr. 1980

Genera
- Chadefaudiella; Faurelina

Family of fungi

The Chadefaudiellaceae are a family of fungi in the Sordariomycetes class, subclass Hypocreomycetidae.
