= Canalisporium =

Scientific classification
- Kingdom: Fungi
- Division: Ascomycota
- Class: Sordariomycetes
- Order: Savoryellales
- Family: Savoryellaceae
- Genus: Canalisporium; Nawawi, A. & Kuthub. (1989)

Species
- See text

Genus of fungi

Canalisporium is a fungus genus of uncertain placement in the Sordariomycetes. It was placed in order of Savoryellales in 2020.

There were 14 species or binomial combinations, according to MycoBank in 2015. Several Canalisporium species have been found in freshwater habitats in Taiwan; such as C. caribense, C. elegans, C. jinghongense, C. kenyense, C. macrosporum, C. nanhuaense, C. parvum, C. paulopallidum, C. taiwanense and C. waffleum.

== Species ==
As accepted by Species Fungorum (in 2020);

- Canalisporium aquaticium J. Yang & K.D. Hyde (2020)
- Canalisporium caribense (Hol.-Jech. & Mercado) Nawawi & Kuthub. (1989)
- Canalisporium dehongense W. Dong, H. Zhang & K.D. Hyde (2019)
- Canalisporium elegans Nawawi & Kuthub. (1989)
- Canalisporium exiguum Goh & K.D. Hyde (1998)
- Canalisporium grenadoidium Sri-indrasutdhi, Boonyuen, Sivichai & E.B.G. Jones (2010)
- Canalisporium jinghongense L. Cai, K.D. Hyde & McKenzie (2003)
- Canalisporium kenyense Goh, W.H. Ho & K.D. Hyde (1998)
- Canalisporium koshabeejae M. Niranjan & V.V. Sarma (2021)
- Canalisporium krabiense Tibpromma & K.D. Hyde (2018)
- Canalisporium macrosporum Goh & C.H. Kuo (2021)
- Canalisporium nanhuaense Goh & C.H. Kuo (2021)
- Canalisporium nigrum G.Z. Zhao (2012)
- Canalisporium pallidum Goh, W.H. Ho & K.D. Hyde (1998)
- Canalisporium panamense A. Ferrer & Shearer (2005)
- Canalisporium parvum Goh & C.H. Kuo (2021)
- Canalisporium paulopallidum Goh & C.H. Kuo (2021)
- Canalisporium taiwanense Goh & C.H. Kuo (2021)
- Canalisporium thailandense Tibpromma & K.D. Hyde (2018)
- Canalisporium variabile Goh & K.D. Hyde (2000)
- Canalisporium waffleum Goh & C.H. Kuo (2021)

Former species;

- C. microsporum G.Z. Zhao (2012) = Trimmatostroma canalisporioides, Mollisiaceae
- C. pulchrum (Hol.-Jech. & Mercado) Nawawi & Kuthub. (1989) = Berkleasmium pulchrum, Pleosporales
