= Mycosphere =

- Discipline: Biology
- Language: English

Publication details
- Publisher: Mushroom Research Foundation
- Impact factor: 16.525 (2021)

Standard abbreviations
- ISO 4: Mycosphere

Indexing
- ISSN: 2077-7019 (print); 2077-7000 (web)

Links
- Journal homepage; Online archive

Mycosphere is a peer-reviewed scientific journal which publishes research articles and reviews about fungal biology.

The journal was founded in 2010 and is the official journal of the Innovative Institute for Plant Health. The journal is published by Mushroom Research Foundation, as of 2022 editor in chief is Ruvishika Shehali Jayawardena from Mae Fah Luang University.

== Abstracting and indexing ==
The journal is abstracted and indexed in:

- Biological Abstracts
- BIOSIS Previews
- Current Contents
- Google Scholar
- Journal Citation Reports/Science Edition
- Science Citation Index Expanded

According to the Journal Citation Reports, the journal has a 2021 impact factor of 16.525.
