= Conioscyphascus =

Scientific classification
- Kingdom: Fungi
- Division: Ascomycota
- Class: Sordariomycetes
- Order: incertae sedis
- Genus: Conioscyphascus; Réblová & Seifert (2004)

Type species
- Conioscyphascus varius Réblová & Seifert (2004)

Genus of fungi

Conioscyphascus is a fungal genus in the Sordariomycetes class (subclass Sordariomycetidae) of the Ascomycota. The relationship of this taxon to other taxa within the class is unknown (incertae sedis), and it has not yet been placed with certainty into any order or family. The genus, Conioscyphascus contains the single species Conioscyphascus varius, described as new to science in 2004. Until Conioscyphascus gracilis (Munk) Réblová & Seifert was found later in 2004.

Following the abolishment of dual nomenclature and adoption of one fungus, one name, Conioscyphascus was then accepted as a synonym of Conioscypha .(Zelski et al. 2015, Réblová et al. 2016c,) Then; Conioscyphascus gracilis (Munk) Réblová & Seifert (2004) became Conioscypha gracilis and Conioscyphascus varius Réblová & Seifert (2004) became Conioscypha varia.
