= Pleurotheciaceae =

Scientific classification
- Kingdom: Fungi
- Division: Ascomycota
- Class: Sordariomycetes
- Subclass: Savoryellomycetidae
- Order: Pleurotheciales; Réblová & Seifert, Persoonia 37: 63 (2015)
- Family: Pleurotheciaceae; Réblová & Seifert, Persoonia 37: 63 (2015)

Type genus
- Pleurothecium Höhn.

Family of fungi

Pleurotheciaceae is a family of ascomycetous fungi within the monotypic order of Pleurotheciales in the subclass Savoryellomycetidae and within the class Sordariomycetes.

Pleurotheciales, with the single-family Pleurotheciaceae, is the largest order in the subclass of Savoryellomycetidae. Pleurotheciaceae species have mostly been isolated from decaying wood or plant debris as saprobes (processing of decayed (dead or waste) organic matter), while few species were also identified as opportunistic human pathogens (such as Phaeoisaria clematidis).

It contains the following genera (with amount of species); Adelosphaeria Réblová (1 species), Anapleurothecium Hern.-Restr., R.F. Castañeda & Gené (3 sp.), Helicoascotaiwania (3 sp.), Melanotrigonum Réblová (1 species), Neomonodictys Y.Z. Lu, C.G. Lin & K.D. Hyde (2 sp.), Phaeoisaria Höhn. (25 sp.), Pleurotheciella Réblová (15 sp.), Pleurothecium Höhn. (12 sp.) and Sterigmatobotrys Oudem. (4 sp.).

== Description ==
Sexual morph; Ascomata perithecial (flask shaped), immersed, semi-immersed (in water) 2 or superficial, papillate or with a central rarely eccentric neck. The ostiole is periphysate (having short, thread-like filaments that line the opening). The peridium is leather-like or fragile, carbonaceous and consisting of two layers. The outer layer is composed of brown to dark brown cells and the inner layer of hyaline (translucent) to pale brown cells. The paraphyses (basally-attached hypha) are abundant, sparsely branched, partially disintegrating and cylindrical in shape. The asci are 8-spored, unitunicate (single-walled), cylindrical or cylindrical-clavate (club-shaped). With short or long pedicellate (having small or slender stalks), with a pronounced J−, apical ring. The ascospores are overlapping or 1–3-seriate (arranged in rows). They are hyaline or versicolorous with polar cells hyaline and the middle cells are brown, ellipsoidal to fusiform (spindle-shaped) and transversely multi-septate. They are lacking a mucilaginous (sticky or viscous when wet) sheath or appendages. Asexual morph: The conidiomata (thin-walled, asexual spores) are present or absent, when present indeterminate synnemata (bundled or fused together) or loose fascicles. Conidiophores macronematous (having morphologically different conidiophore) or semi-macronematous, sometimes elongating percurrently. The conidiogenous cells are holoblastic (cleaved or separated), conidial secession rhexolytic on short denticles or rachis on sympodially extending polyblastic conidiogenous cells, or schizolytic on monoblastic or solitary thallic conidiogenous cells. The conidia are hyaline, sometimes with protracted maturation of the middle cells, which turn brown, or brown or versicolorous, septate or aseptate.

== History ==
The family of Pleurotheciaceae was introduced by Réblová et al. (2016c) in the Pleurotheciales order. Ten genera, i.e. Adelosphaeria, Brachysporiella, Helicoon, Melanotrigonum, Phaeoisaria, Phragmocephala, Pleurotheciella, Pleurothecium, Sterigmatobotrys and Taeniolella, were also originally included in this family (Réblová et al. 2016c). Maharachchikumbura et al. (2016b) then accepted eleven genera in Pleurotheciaceae including Plagiascoma, which was later placed in Fuscosporellales order (Réblová et al. 2016c, Yang et al. 2016b, Wijayawardene et al. 2017a, 2018a,). In addition, Monotosporella and Helicoon were considered as members of Savoryellaceae (Savoryellales) in Maharachchikumbura et al. (2016b), while they were confirmed in Pleurotheciaceae by Réblová et al. (2012, 2016c,). Monotosporella was treated as a synonym of Brachysporiella by Ellis (1959). Hernández-Restrepo et al. (2017) considered the genera Brachysporiella and Monotosporella distinct with support of multi-locus phylogenetic analysis, and placed the genera in Kirschsteiniotheliales and Pleurotheciales, respectively. Wijayawardene et al. (2017a) placed Brachysporiella in Pleurotheciaceae and Monotosporella in Savoryellaceae, however, Wijayawardene et al. (2018a) transferred Brachysporiella to Kirschsteiniotheliales genera incertae sedis and retained Monotosporella in Savoryellaceae. Anapleurothecium was introduced by Hernández-Restrepo et al. (2017), and placed in Pleurotheciaceae. Plagiascoma was accepted in Pleurotheciaceae by Wijayawardene et al. (2017a, 2018a). It was then removed in 2020 to Fuscosporellaceae family (Fuscosporellales order).

Former genus; Taeniolella, based on species Taeniolella rudis, was included in Pleurotheciaceae by Réblová et al. (2016c) as sister to genus Sterigmatobotrys. The fertile, penicillate sterigmatobotrys-like conidiophores developing at the apex of the Taeniolella conidium were earlier reported by Réblová & Seifert (2011) suggesting a close relationship between the two genera. Ertz et al. (2016) transferred Taeniolella rudis to Sterigmatobotrys, based on the morphology of the penicillate syna-sexual morph and molecular data. The type species, Taeniolella exilis, was placed in Kirschsteiniotheliaceae in Dothideomycetes, and Taeniolella was recovered as strongly polyphyletic (Ertz et al. 2016). Wijayawardene et al. (2017a) placed in Kirschsteiniotheliaceae (Kirschsteiniotheliales, Dothideomycetes), however, Ekanayaka et al. (2017) transferred this genus to Mytilinidiaceae (Mytilinidiales, Dothideomycetes), and Wijayawardene et al. (2018a) accepted this treatment.

It was shown that Helicoon is strongly polyphyletic. It was placed in three different classes, viz. Leotiomycetes, Sordariomycetes and also Dothideomycetes (Tsui & Berbee 2006). Helicoon farinosum was included in Pleurotheciaceae by Réblová et al. (2016c) and Maharachchikumbura et al. (2016b) based on the support of the multi-locus phylogenetic analyses. Wijayawardene et al. (2017a) placed this genus in family Orbiliaceae (Orbiliales, Orbiliomycetes), however, Wijayawardene et al. (2018a) placed it in Savoryellaceae (Savoryellales, Sordariomycetes). Dayarathne et al. (2019a) introduced Helicoascotaiwania to accommodate Ascotaiwania hughesii (whose asexual morph is Helicoon farinosum) and placed this genus in Pleurotheciaceae. In 2020, however, Wijayawardene et al. (2018a) replaced it back into Savoryellaceae. It stayed there in 2022.

Phragmocephala is polyphyletic (Su et al. 2015, Réblová et al. 2016b, Hernández-Restrepo et al. 2017). There are nine accepted species epithets in Index Fungorum (as of 2020), however, only three of them, P. garethjonesii, P. glanduliformis and P. stemphylioides, have molecular data available. Su et al. (2015) introduced P. garethjonesii based on DNA sequence data and morphology and placed this species in Melanommataceae in Dothideomycetes. Réblová et al. (2016c) placed P. stemphylioides in Pleurotheciaceae in Sordariomycetes based on multi-locus phylogenetic analyses. Phragmocephala glanduliformis was placed in Microthyriaceae in Dothideomycetes by Hernández- Restrepo et al. (2017). In 2020, it was placed back in Pleurotheciaceae. But not in 2022.

Phaeoisaria (Pleurotheciales) was established by Höhnel (1909) to accommodate Phaeoisaria bambusae as the type species, a hyphomycetous taxon isolated from a bamboo substrate. Phaeoisaria clematidis is known to cause Keratomycosis (a fungal infection of the cornea), as well as Pleurothecium recurvatum (formerly Carpoligna pleurothecii).

A multi-locus phylogenetic analyses based on a combined ITS, LSU, SSU and rpb2 sequence data of Pleurotheciales was presented. Bayesian inference, maximum parsimony and maximum likelihood were used for phylogenetic analyses. The analyses provided similar tree topologies, which are similar with those in Réblová et al. (2016c), Yang et al. (2016b), Hernández-Restrepo et al. (2017), Hyde et al. (2017b, 2018b,) and Luo et al. (2018). The problematic genera and species and the newly introduced genus after Réblová et al. (2016c), Phragmocephala stemphylioides (DAOM 673211), Brachysporiella setosa (HKUCC 3713) (current name: Monotosporella setosa), Anapleurothecium botulisporum (FMR 11490), Taeniolella rudis (DAOM 229838) (current name: Sterigmatobotrys rudis), Helicoon farinosum (current name: Helicoascotaiwania hughesii) (ILLS 53605 and DAOM 241947), are grouped in a robust clade Pleurotheciaceae.

== Genera ==
In early 2020, the family contained Adelosphaeria Réblová (1), Anapleurothecium Hern.-Restr., R.F. Castañeda & Gené (1), Helgardiomyces Crous (1), Helicoön Morgan (28), Melanotrigonum Réblová (1), Monotosporella S. Hughes (4), Neomonodictys Y.Z. Lu, C.G. Lin & K.D. Hyde (1), Phaeoisaria Höhn. (23), Phragmocephala E.W. Mason & S. Hughes (15), Pleurotheciella Réblová (11), Pleurothecium Höhn. (11), Rhynchobrunnera B.A. McDonald, U. Braun & Crous (2), Saprodesmium W. Dong & Doilom (1) and Sterigmatobotrys Oudem. (6). Containing 106 species.

It was estimated to have 85 species in Nov 2020, in the following genera; Adelosphaeria Anapleurothecium, Helicoascotaiwania, Melanotrigonum, Monotosporella, Phaeoisaria, Phragmocephala, Pleurotheciella, Pleurothecium and Sterigmatobotrys.

As of 2020 it contained the following genera; Adelosphaeria (1 species), Anapleurothecium (3 sp.), Helicoascotaiwania (3 sp.), Melanotrigonum (1 species), Neomonodictys (2 sp.), Phaeoisaria (25 sp.), Pleurotheciella (15 sp.), Pleurothecium (12 sp.) and Sterigmatobotrys (4 sp.), with up to 66 known species.

In 2022, Phaeoisarialaianensis a new species that was found in freshwater habitats in China, was added to the Pleurotheciaceae family. In 2023, Rhexoacrodictys melanospora was found in China. Genus Rhexoacrodictys was introduced by Baker et al. (2002) to accommodate Rhexoacrodictys erecta (Ellis & Everh.) W.A. Baker & Morgan-Jones.

== Distribution ==
It has a scattered cosmopolitan distribution. It is found in parts of Southern Europe, (including France, and the Iberian Peninsula (Spain and Portugal)), in China, Taiwan, Vietnam, Brazil, Cuba, New Zealand, and in Thailand (in Satun and Songkhla provinces).

== Habitats ==
Members of the Pleurotheciaceae fungal family are saprobes, in terrestrial habitats, and mainly found in submerged wood (such as twigs and branches,) in freshwater habitats, in forests. Such as species Pleurotheciella erumpens is found in lentic (lake) and lotic (river) habitats in France and New Zealand. Also Phaeoisaria ellipsoidea and Sterigmatobotrys rudis which have been found in submerged decaying wood in Manfeilong reservoir in Xishuangbanna, Yunnan Province, China. Also Neomonodictys aquatica was collected from submerged decaying wood in Erhai Lake, Yunnan Province, China.

Although, some species of Phaeoisaria are found in intertidal marine sediment. Also Pleurothecium clavatum has been found in soil in China.
