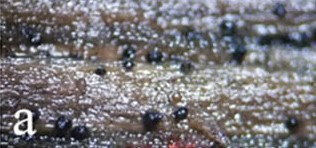
- Ascomata of Savoryella yunnanensis on host surface

Scientific classification
- Kingdom: Fungi
- Division: Ascomycota
- Class: Sordariomycetes
- Subclass: Savoryellomycetidae
- Order: Savoryellales; Boonyuen, Suetrong, S. Sivichai, K.L. Pang & E.B.G. Jones
- Family: Savoryellaceae; Jaklitsch & Réblová

= Savoryellaceae =

Order of fungi

Savoryellaceae is a family of aquatic based fungi. It is the only family in the monotypic order Savoryellales within the class Sordariomycetes, division Ascomycota.

The family contains the genera: Ascotaiwania (11 species), Canalisporium (21 species), Dematiosporium (1 species; Dematiosporium aquaticum Z.L. Luo, K.D. Hyde & H.Y. Su (2019)), Monotosporella (3 species), Neoascotaiwania (4 species) and lastly, Savoryella (13 species).

== History ==
The taxonomic placement of freshwater and marine Savoryella species has been widely debated, and the genus had been tentatively assigned to various orders within the Sordariomycetes class.

The genus had been tentatively placed in order Sphaeriales incertae sedis (now Diaporthales) by Kohlmeyer & Kohlmeyer in 1979, Ascomycetes incertae sedis by Eriksson & Hawksworth in 1986, family Amphisphaeriaceae by Eriksson & Hawksworth in 1987, order Sordariales by Jones & Hyde in 1992, and order Halosphaeriales by Read et al. in 1993 based on morphological features. Vijaykrishna et al. in 2006 showed Savoryella belongs to Hypocreales order based on phylogenetic analysis of partial small subunit rRNA (SSU). The genus Savoryella, based on morphological features, was then placed in the Sordariales order genera incertae sedis by Jones et al. (2009), and, later, Boonyuen et al. (2011), showed that genera Savoryella, Ascotaiwania, Ascothailandia, and Canalisporium all cluster in the order Savoryellales within class Hypocreomycetidae, Sordariomycetes. According to the one fungus-one name concept by Hawksworth in 2011, the genus Canalisporium was recommended for protection over Ascothailandia hence, it was then synonymized under Canalisporium based on sequence data (Sri-indrasutdhi et al., 2010).

The family Savoryellaceae (Savoryellales) was then established by Jaklitsch and Réblová in 2015, and was typified by the genus Savoryella. Boonyuen et al. (2011), had earlier introduced the order Savoryellales, but without designating a family to it. According to phylogenetic and molecular clock analyses (Hongsanan et al., 2017; Hyde et al., 2017), the orders Conioscyphales, Fuscosporellales, Pleurotheciales, and Savoryellales cluster together as a distinct clade, with a stem age of 268 Mya. Hence, the order Savoryellales was referred to a new subclass Savoryellomycetidae by Hongsanan et al. (2017), which was then supported by other studies.

In 2016, Savoryellales consisted of family Savoryellaceae with three genera, Ascotaiwania, Canalisporium and Savoryella. Then Maharachchikumbura et al. (2016), and Wijayawardene et al. (2018), accepted the placement of Savoryellaceae in the order Savoryellales. With the inclusion of the genus Neoascotaiwania, Savoryellaceae comprised four genera: Ascotaiwania, Canalisporium, and Savoryella (Hernández-Restrepo et al.) in 2017. Then freshwater genera and asexual fungus from Erhai lake in China, Dematiosporium was added to the Savoryellaceae family in 2019. Lastly, anamorphic fungal genus Monotosporella was also added later to the order and family.

== Description ==
Generally, Savoryellaceae species share a set of characters including immersed, semi-immersed to superficial, non-stromatic, heavily pigmented, coriaceous (leathery; stiff and tough, but flexible) ascomata, mostly lying horizontally to the host, partly deliquescing (liquefying or melting), paraphyses, unitunicate (single-walled) asci comprises non-amyloid apical annulus, and fusiform (spindle or rod-shaped) to ellipsoidal shaped, transversely septate (walled) ascospores with hyaline (translucent) end cells and brown median cells (Jones and Eaton, 1969; Jones and Hyde, 1992; Tsui and Hyde, 2003; Jones et al., 2009; Boonyuen et al., 2011,).

Taxonomic studies of marine Ascomycotina with the ultrastructure of the asci, ascospores and appendages of Savoryella were studied in 1993.

The sexual morphs of Savoryellaceae species have perithecial (spherical, cylindrical, or flask-shaped hollow) ascomata (fruiting body) with elongate necks, while the asexual morphs are dematiaceous (produce melanin in their cell walls, giving them a characteristic brown colour especially when grown on agar) hyphomycetes with semi-macronematous conidiophores (morphologically different conidiophore from the vegetative hyphae) and monoblastic (one primary germ layer) conidiogenous (producing conidia) cells.

Different types of asexual morphs (based on morphological observations only) have been experimentally linked to Ascotaiwania and Neoascotaiwania species such as, monotosporella-like in Ascotaiwania sawada (Sivichai et al., 1998), and Ascotaiwania mitriformis (Ranghoo and Hyde, 1998), monodictys-like in Ascotaiwania lignicola (Chang, 2001), trichocladium-like in Ascotaiwania hsilio (Chang, 2001), and bactrodesmium-like asexual morphs for Neoascotaiwania species (Hernández-Restrepo et al., 2017). These various asexual morphs have previously led to confusion in the classification of various sexual genera in the family. Canalisporium species comprise muriform (spores arranged like bricks in a wall) conidia (with sexual morph – Ascothailandia; Sri-indrasutdhi et al., 2010), but not all species have been sequenced. Therefore, Savoryellaceae asexual morphs are associated with dematiaceous hyphomycetes characterized by semi-macronematous conidiophores (conidiophores that are only slightly morphologically different from the vegetative hyphae) and monoblastic conidiogenous cells generating brown, thick-walled, dictyoseptate conidia that are transversely septate or cheiroid. Cheiroid means "spores in which several to many columns of cells arise from a common origin and grow parallel or diverge moderately". The distant position of Helicoon farinosum (asexual morph of Ascotaiwania hughesii) (Fallah et al., 1999), from the rest of members of Savoryellaceae was confirmed by phylogenetic analysis (Boonyuen et al., 2011; Réblová et al., 2012)".

== Distribution and habitat ==
The various fungal species in the order are found in terrestrial, marine, brackish and freshwater habitats, this includes places such as water-cooling towers, and also reservoirs.

Some species of Savoryellaceae are found abundant on submerged wood in aquatic habitats and some species have been reported found on terrestrial woody plants.

For example; Ascotaiwania species have been isolated from submerged and decaying wood in freshwater habitats, and are widely distributed in countries such as Ecuador, France, Great Britain, Hong Kong, Malaysia, Mauritius, Taiwan, Thailand, and Australia. While Canalisporium species are saprobes (processing of decayed (dead or waste) organic matter), mostly on rotten wood and are distributed in tropical regions of both hemispheres of the world. They are also found on woody plants, and submerged, decaying wood in freshwater. Canalisporium species have been recorded from Cuba, India, Kenya, Malaysia, Taiwan, Thailand, and Uganda. Though Savoryella species are cosmopolitan in distribution, although they are mostly common in tropical and subtropical ecosystems. Neoascotaiwania species have been documented from forest soil in Spain, and also on decaying wood collected in streams in Taiwan. Lastly, genus Monotosporella is distributed worldwide, and it is usually found growing on decaying wood submerged in freshwater. but has also been reported as being found on woody plants outside of aquatic habitats.

Species in the family Savoryellaceae generally have a scattered distribution worldwide. Including places such as; North America, (including Florida,) Cuba, parts of Southern Europe (including Spain, and Hungary,), Africa including Kenya, India, Thailand, Malaysia, Taiwan, China, Japan, Hong Kong, Australia, and New Zealand.
