= Halosphaeriaceae =

Scientific classification
- Kingdom: Fungi
- Division: Ascomycota
- Class: Sordariomycetes
- Order: Microascales
- Family: Halosphaeriaceae; E.Müll. & Arx ex Kohlm. (1972)

Type genus
- Halosphaeria Linder (1944)

Family of fungi

The Halosphaeriaceae are a family of fungi in the Sordariomycetes class, subclass Hypocreomycetidae. Halosphaeriaceae is the family with the largest number of marine fungi with a few species are from freshwater and terrestrial habitats (Jones et al. 2009, 2015, 2017, 2019; Hyde et al. 2020a).

As of 2015, it had 141 species distributed among 59 genera, that had increased to 64 genera in 2020.

== Genera ==
As accepted in 2020;

- Alisea J.Dupont & E.B.G.Jones (2009) – 1 sp.
- Amphitrite S.Tibell (2016) – 1 sp.
- Aniptodera Shearer & M.Miller (1977) – 21 spp.
- Aniptosporopsis K.L.Pang, C.L.Lu, W.T.Ju & E.B.G.Jones (2016) – 1 sp.
- Anisostagma K.R.L.Petersen & Jørg.Koch (1996) – 1 sp.
- Antennospora Meyers (1957) – 2 spp.
- Appendichordella R.G.Johnson, E.B.G.Jones & S.T.Moss (1987) – 1 sp.
- Arenariomyces Höhnk (1954 – 5 spp.
- Ascosacculus J.Campbell, J.L.Anderson & Shearer (2003) – 1 sp.
- Bathyascus Kohlm. (1977) – 5 spp.
- Buxetroldia K.R.L.Petersen & Jørg.Koch (1997) – 1 sp.
- Carbosphaerella I.Schmidt (1969) – 2 spp.
- Ceriosporopsis Linder (1944) – 9 spp.
- Chadefaudia Feldm.-Maz. (1957) – 6 spp.
- Cirrenalia Meyers & R.T.Moore (1960) – 15 spp.
- Corallicola Volkm.-Kohlm. & Kohlm. (1992) – 1 sp.
- Corollospora Werderm (1922) – 25 spp.
- Cucullosporella K.D.Hyde & E.B.G.Jones (1990) – 1 sp.
- Cucurbitinus L.L. Liu & Z.Y. Liu, in Liu, Liu, Yang, Chen & Liu - 2 spp.
- Ebullia K.L.Pang (2014) – 1 sp.
- Fluviatispora K.D.Hyde (1994) – 3 spp.
- Gesasha Abdel-Wahab & Nagah. (2011) – 3 spp.
- Haiyanga K.L.Pang & E.B.G.Jones (2008) – 1 sp.
- Haligena Kohlm. (1961) – 1 sp.
- Halosarpheia Kohlm. & E.Kohlm. (1977) – 8 spp.
- Halosphaeria Linder (1944) – 1 sp.
- Halosphaeriopsis T.W.Johnson (1958) – 1 sp.
- Havispora K.L.Pang & Vrijmoed (2008) – 1 sp.
- Iwilsoniella E.B.G.Jones (1991) – 1 sp.
- Kitesporella Jheng & K.L.Pang (2012) – 1 sp.
- Kochiella Sakay., K.L.Pang & E.B.G.Jones (2011) – 1 sp.
- Lautisporopsis E.B.G.Jones, Yusoff & S.T.Moss (1998) – 1 sp.
- Lignincola Höhnk (1955) – 2 spp.
- Limacospora Jørg.Koch & E.B.G.Jones (1995) – 1 sp.
- Luttrellia Shearer (1978) – 4 spp.
- Magnisphaera J.Campb., J.L.Anderson & Shearer (2003) – 2 spp.
- Marinospora A.R.Caval. (1966) – 2 spp.
- Moana Kohlm. & Volkm.-Kohlm. (1989) – 1 sp.
- Morakotiella Sakay. (2005) – 1 sp.
- Nais Kohlm. (1962) – 3 spp.
- Natantispora J.Campb., J.L. Anderson & Shearer (2003) – 3 spp.
- Nautosphaeria E.B.G.Jones (1964) – 1 sp.
- Neptunella K.L.Pang & E.B.G.Jones (2003) – 1 sp.
- Nereiospora E.B.G.Jones, R.G.Johnson & S.T.Moss. (1983) – 2 spp.
- Nimbospora Jørg.Koch (1982) – 1 sp.
- Oceanitis Kohlm. (1977) – 4 spp.
- Ocostaspora E.B.G.Jones, R.G.Johnson & S.T.Moss (1983) – 1 sp.
- Okeanomyces K.L.Pang & E.B.G.Jones (2004) – 1 sp.
- Ondiniella E.B.G.Jones, R.G.Johnson & S.T.Moss (1984) – 1 sp.
- Ophiodeira Kohlm. & Volkm.-Kohlm. (1988) – 1 sp.
- Panorbis J.Campb., J.L.Anderson & Shearer (2003) – 1 sp.
- Paraaniptodera K.L.Pang, C.L.Lu, W.T.Ju & E.B.G.Jones (2017) – 1 sp.
- Phaeonectriella R.A.Eaton & E.B.G.Jones (1971) – 1 sp.
- Pileomyces K.L.Pang & Jheng (2012) – 1 sp.
- Praelongicaulis E.B.G.Jones, Abdel-Wahab & K.L.Pang (2015) – 1 sp.
- Pseudolignincola Chatmala & E.B.G.Jones (2006) – 1 sp.
- Remispora Linder (1944) – 5 spp.
- Saagaromyces K.L.Pang & E.B.G.Jones (2003) – 3 spp.
- Sablicola E B.G.Jones, K.L.Pang & Vrijmoed (2004) – 1 sp.
- Thalassogena Kohlm. & Volkm.-Kohlm. (1987) – 1 sp.
- Thalespora Chatmala & E.B.G.Jones (2006) – 1 sp.
- Tinhaudeus K.L.Pang, S.Y.Guo & E.B.G.Jones (2015) – 1 sp.
- Tirispora E.B.G.Jones & Vrijmoed (1994) – 1 sp.
- Toriella Sakay., K.L.Pang & E.B.G.Jones (2011) – 1 sp.
- Trailia G.K.Sutherl. (1915) – 1 sp.
- Trichomaris Hibbits, G.C.Hughes & Sparks (1981) – 1 sp.
- Tubakiella Sakay., K.L.Pang & E.B.G.Jones (2011) – 1 sp.
- Tunicatispora K.D.Hyde (1990) – 1 sp.
