= Evan Benjamin Gareth Jones =

English mycologist (born 1936)

Evan Benjamin Gareth Jones (born 1937) is a British mycologist. His main area of research interest is aquatic fungi, particularly marine fungi. He has supervised about 100 PhD and MSc students, published approximately 600 research articles and is a highly cited scientist. Other research interests include marine biofouling, biodeterioration of materials, and wood decay by fungi.

Jones earned a PhD from the University of Leeds in 1963, where his supervisors were Irene Manton and David Jennings.

== Recognition ==
In 2016, an issue of the scientific journal Mycosphere was dedicated to him in honour of his 80th birthday in January 2017. Many species have been named in his honour. The eponyms include Arthrinium garethjonesii D.Q.Dai & H.B.Jiang (2017); Brunneodinemasporium jonesii Y.Z.Lu, Jian K.Liu & K.D.Hyde (2016); Chaetosphaeria garethjonesii R.H.Perera, Maharachch. & K.D.Hyde (2016); Cookeina garethjonesii Ekanayaka, Q. Zhao & K.D.Hyde (2016); Cymostachys garethjonesii C.G.Lin, Yong Wang bis & K.D.Hyde (2016); Dictyocheirospora garethjonesii Z.L.Luo, Hong Y.Su & K.D.Hyde (2017); Melanochaeta garethjonesii Sivichai & Hywel-Jones (2000); Montagnula jonesii Tennakoon, Wanas., Phook. & K.D.Hyde (2016); Muyocopron garethjonesii Tibpromma, Karun. & K.D.Hyde (2016); Neoleptosphaeria jonesii Wanas., Camporesi & K.D.Hyde (2016); Neooccultibambusa jonesii Jayasiri, Camporesi & K.D.Hyde (2016); Neorhamphoria garethjonesii Boonmee, Hüseyın & Selçuk (2016); Oxydothis garethjonesii S.Konta & K.D.Hyde (2016); Parafuscosporella garethii Boonyuen, Chuaseehar. & Somrith. (2016); Phragmocephala garethjonesii Hong Y.Su, Udayanga & K.D.Hyde (2015); Poaceicola garethjonesii Thambug., Camporesi & K.D.Hyde (2017); and Tainosphaeria jonesii Y.Z.Lu, Jian K.Liu & K.D.Hyde (2016).
