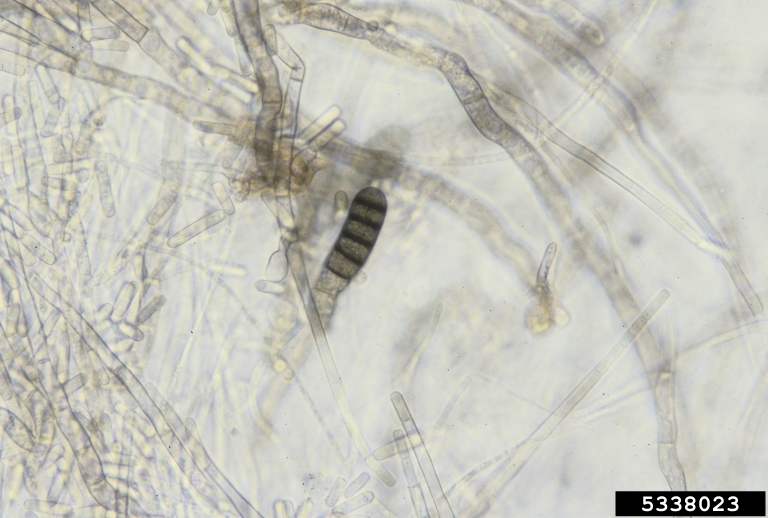
- Thielaviopsis basicola

Scientific classification
- Domain: Eukaryota
- Kingdom: Fungi
- Division: Ascomycota
- Class: Sordariomycetes
- Subclass: Hypocreomycetidae
- Order: Microascales; Luttr. ex Benny & Kimbr. (1980)

Families
- (with amount of genera): Ceratocystidaceae (11); Chadefaudiellaceae (2); Gondwanamycetaceae (2); Graphiaceae (1); Halosphaeriaceae (68); Microascaceae (23); Triadelphiaceae (2)

Synonyms
- Halosphaeriales Kohlm. (1986)

= Microascales =

Order of fungi

The Microascales are an order of fungi in the class Sordariomycetes, subclass Hypocreomycetidae. This is a relatively small order of mostly saprobic fungi that live in soil, rotting vegetation and dung. Some species are plant pathogens, such as Ceratocystis fimbriata, transmitted by beetles to living trees and causing cacao wilt and many other economically important diseases. Species in the genus Pseudallescheria (family Microascaceae) are pathogenic to humans The order was circumscribed in 1980. Wijayawardene et al. in 2020 added more families and genera to the order.

== Description ==
The Microascales are characterized by a lack of stroma, black perithecial ascomata with long necks or rarely with cleistothecial ascomata that lack paraphyses. They have roughly spherical and short-lived asci that develop singly or in chains. Nonseptate, colorless ascospores often have ornamenting ridges or wings. The anamorphs of the family Microascaceae produce percurrently proliferating conidiogenous cells (annellides) and sometimes chlamydospore-like or aleurioconidial synanamorphs; these are classified mostly in the genera Scopulariopsis, Graphium and Scedosporium.
