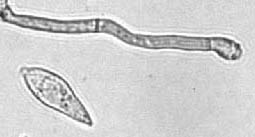
- Magnaporthe grisea

Scientific classification
- Kingdom: Fungi
- Division: Ascomycota
- Class: Sordariomycetes
- Subclass: Diaporthomycetidae; Senan., Maharachch. & K.D.Hyde, 2015

Orders
- Annulatascales; Atractosporales; Calosphaeriales; Diaporthales; Distoseptisporales; Jobellisiales; Magnaporthales; Myrmecridiales; Ophiostomatales; Pararamichloridiales; Phomatosporales; Sporidesmiales; Tirisporellales; Togniniales; Trichosphaeriales; Xenospadicoidales

= Diaporthomycetidae =

Subclass of fungi

Diaporthomycetidae is a subclass of sac fungi under the class Sordariomycetes.

The subclass was formed in 2015 for some fungi taxa that were already placed within Sordariomycetidae subclass but that were phylogenetically and morphologically distinct from genera in Sordariomycetidae. Members of Diaporthomycetidae can occur in both aquatic and terrestrial habitats as saprobes (living on decayed dead or waste organic matter), pathogens, or endophytes (within a plant for at least part of its life cycle without causing apparent disease).

In 2017, there were up to 15 orders and 65 families in this subclass. More orders may be confirmed in DNA-based phylogenetic analysis studies in 2021.

== Distribution ==
Member in the order have a cosmopolitan distribution, including being found in China and Thailand, and parts of Europe.

They can be found in freshwater habitats.

== Orders ==
As accepted by Wijayawardene et al. 2020;

- Annulatascales - family Annulatascaceae (with 13 genera)
- Atractosporales
  - Atractosporaceae (2)
  - Conlariaceae (2)
  - Pseudoproboscisporaceae (3)
- Calosphaeriales
  - Calosphaeriaceae (4)
  - Pleurostomataceae (1)
- Diaporthales
- Apiosporopsidaceae (1)
- Apoharknessiaceae (2)
- Asterosporiaceae (1)
- Auratiopycnidiellaceae (1)
- Coryneaceae (2)
- Cryphonectriaceae (27)
- Cytosporaceae (6)
- Diaporthaceae (15)
- Diaporthosporellaceae (1)
- Diaporthostomataceae (1)
- Dwiroopaceae (1)
- Erythrogloeaceae (4)
- Foliocryphiaceae (2)
- Gnomoniaceae (37)
- Harknessiaceae (2)
- Juglanconidaceae (2)
- Lamproconiaceae (2)
- Macrohilaceae (1)
- Mastigosporellaceae (1)
- Melanconidaceae (1)
- Melanconiellaceae (8)
- Neomelanconiellaceae (1)
- Phaeoappendicosporaceae (2)
- Prosopidicolaceae (1)
- Pseudomelanconidaceae (3)
- Pseudoplagiostomataceae (1)
- Pyrisporaceae (1)
- Schizoparmaceae (1)
- Stilbosporaceae (4)
- Sydowiellaceae (21)
- Synnemasporellaceae (1)
- Tubakiaceae (8)
- Distoseptisporales - Distoseptisporaceae (1)
- Jobellisiales - Jobellisiaceae (1)
- Magnaporthales
  - Ceratosphaeriaceae (1)
  - Magnaporthaceae (24)
  - Ophioceraceae (2)
  - Pseudohalonectriaceae (1)
  - Pyriculariaceae (11)
- Myrmecridiales
  - Myrmecridiaceae (2)
  - Xenodactylariaceae (1)
- Ophiostomatales
  - Kathistaceae (3)
  - Ophiostomataceae (12)
- Pararamichloridiales - Pararamichloridiaceae (1, Pararamichloridium)
- Phomatosporales - Phomatosporaceae (3)
- Sporidesmiales - Sporidesmiaceae (1, Sporidesmium)
- Tirisporellales - Tirisporellaceae (3)
- Togniniales - Togniniaceae (1)
- Xenospadicoidales - Xenospadicoidaceae (5)

== Incertae sedis ==
As accepted by Wijayawardene et al. 2020;

=== Families ===
- Barbatosphaeriaceae H. Zhang, K.D. Hyde & Maharachch.
  - Barbatosphaeria Réblová (9)
  - Ceratostomella Sacc. (18)
  - Xylomelasma Réblová (4)
- Papulosaceae Winka & O.E. Erikss.
  - Brunneosporella V.M. Ranghoo & K.D. Hyde (1)
  - Fluminicola S.W. Wong, K.D. Hyde & E.B.G. Jones (5)
  - Papulosa Kohlm & Volkm-Kohlm (1)
  - Wongia Khemmuk, Geering & R.G. Shivas. (3)
- Rhamphoriaceae Réblová
  - Rhamphoria Niessl (15)
  - Rhamphoriopsis Réblová & Gardiennet (1)
  - Rhodoveronaea Arzanlou, W. Gams & Crous (1)
  - Xylolentia Réblová (1)
- Thyridiaceae O.E. Erikss & J.Z. Yue
  - Pleurocytospora Petr. (3)
  - Thyridium Nitschke (34)
- Trichosphaeriaceae G. Winter
  - Aquidictyomyces W. Dong, H. Zhang & K.D. Hyde (1)*
  - Brachysporium Sacc. (25)
  - Collematospora Jeng & Cain (1)
  - Coniobrevicolla Réblová (1)
  - Eriosphaeria Sacc. (24)
  - Koorchaloma Subram. {{{1}}} (11)
  - Rizalia Syd. & P. Syd. (6)
  - Schweinitziella Speg. (4)
  - Setocampanula Sivan. & W.H. Hsieh (1)
  - Trichosphaeria Fuckel (20)
  - Unisetosphaeria Pinnoi, E.B.G. Jones, McKenzie & K.D. Hyde (1)
- Woswasiaceae H. Zhang, K.D. Hyde & Maharachch.
  - Cyanoannulus Raja, J. Campb. & Shearer (1)
  - Woswasia Jaklitsch, Réblová & Voglmayr (1)
  - Xylochrysis Réblová (1)

=== Genera incertae sedis ===
- Aquimonospora J. Yang & K.D. Hyde (1)
- Aquaticola W.H. Ho, C.K.M. Tsui, Hodgkiss & K.D. Hyde (5)
- Fusoidispora D. Vijaykr., Jeewon & K.D. Hyde (1)
- Kaarikia C. Mayers & T.C. Harr. (1)*
- Platytrachelon Réblová (1)
- Proliferophorum G.N. Wang, H. Zhang & Senan. (1)
- Pseudoconlarium N.G. Liu, K.D. Hyde & J.K. Liu (1)
- Pseudostanjehughesia J. Yang & K.D. Hyde (1)
