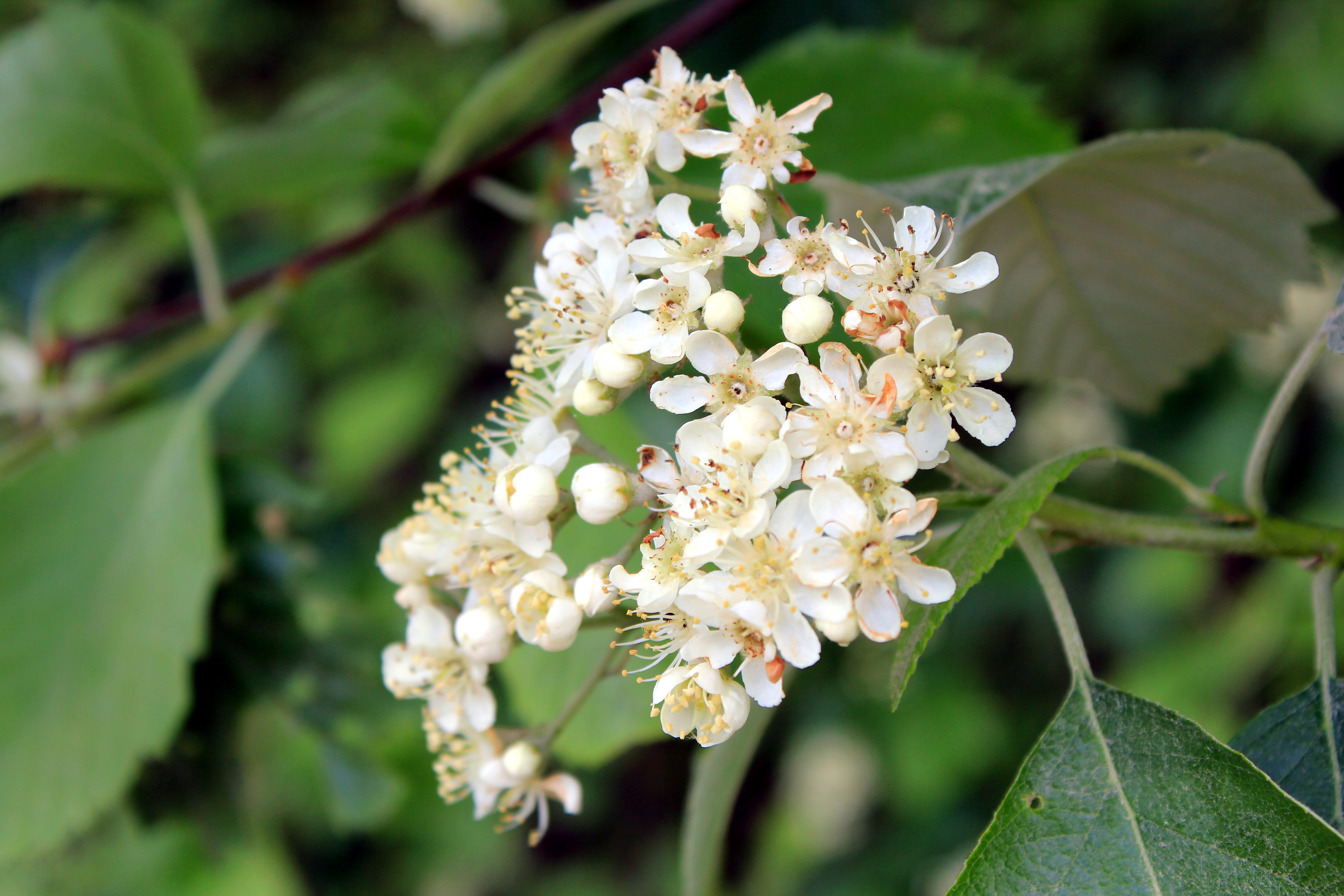
- Aria cordigastensis inflorescence

Conservation status
- Endangered (IUCN 3.1)

Scientific classification
- Kingdom: Plantae
- Clade: Tracheophytes
- Clade: Angiosperms
- Clade: Eudicots
- Clade: Rosids
- Order: Rosales
- Family: Rosaceae
- Genus: Aria
- Species: A. cordigastensis

Binomial name
- Aria cordigastensis (N.Mey.) Mosyakin, Fedor. & McNeill
- It is endemic to Bavaria, Germany

Synonyms
- Karpatiosorbus cordigastensis (N.Mey.) Sennikov & Kurtto; Pyrus cordigastensis (N.Mey.) M.F.Fay & Christenh.; Sorbus cordigastensis N.Mey.

= Aria cordigastensis =

Species of tree in the family Rosaceae

Aria cordigastensis, the Kordigast whitebeam, is an apomictic species of tree in the family Rosaceae endemic to Bavaria, Germany. It is an extremely rare and endangered species.

== Description ==
Aria cordigastensis tree growing in the Franconian Jura

Fruiting branches of Aria cordigastensis

Underside of Aria cordigastensis leaf

=== Vegetative characteristics ===
Aria cordigastensis is an up to 15 m tall tree or shrub. The 5–8 cm long, ovate, lobed leaves of the short twigs have 8–10 pairs of lateral veins, which are set 5 mm apart. The leaf base is cuneate. The larger, 9–11 cm long leaves of the long twigs have 10–12 pairs of lateral veins. The petiole is up to 3 cm long. The abaxial leaf surface is tomentose with grey hair. It produces root sprouts.

=== Generative characteristics ===
The inflorescence bears 50–60 flowers. The pyriform, orange-red, 12–14 mm long accessory fruit bears numerous 0.25–0.5 mm wide lenticels.

=== Cytology ===
The chromosome count is 2n = 3x = 51. It is triploid.

== Taxonomy ==
It was first described as Sorbus cordigastensis N.Mey. by Norbert Meyer in 2005. It was moved to the genus Aria (Pers.) J.Jacq. ex Host as Aria acutiserrata (C.Németh) Mosyakin, Fedor. & McNeill by Sergei Leonidovich Mosyakin, Mykola Mykhaylovych Fedoronchuk, and John McNeill in 2025. The type specimen was collected on the 19 May 2001 by N. Meyer and O. Angerer in the Kordigast mountain in Bavaria, Germany.

=== Etymology ===
The specific epithet cordigastensis refers to the Kordigast mountain in Bavaria, Germany.

== Distribution and habitat ==
It is endemic to Bavaria, Germany, where it occurs in a small area of 8 km^{2} in open pine forests and on the edges of deciduous beech forests at elevations of 400–450 m above sea level.

== Ecology ==
The seeds are dispersed by blackbirds.

== Conservation ==
It is an endangered species with a small, but stable population of 100 mature trees and well over 1500 saplings. Aria cordigastensis can reproduce successfully in its natural habitat, but the saplings have difficulties establishing themselves, due to heavy browsing by grazing animals and competition for light from other tree species. It is not protected by law. It is cultivated in the ex situ conservation collections of the Botanischer Garten der Universität Regensburg, in the Ecological-Botanical Garden of the University of Bayreuth, and in the private collection of Karsten Horn.
