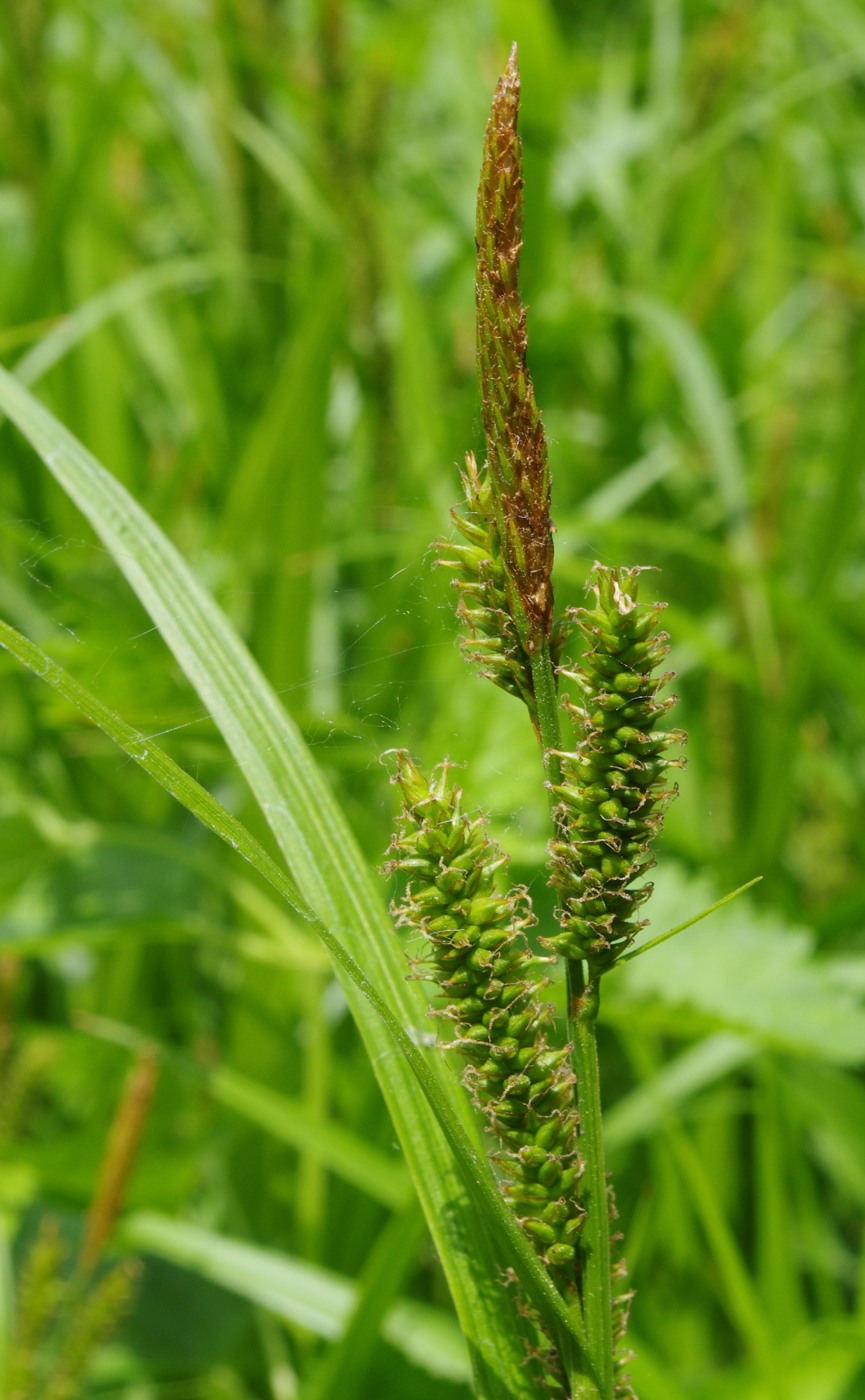
- At the Ecological-Botanical Garden of the University of Bayreuth
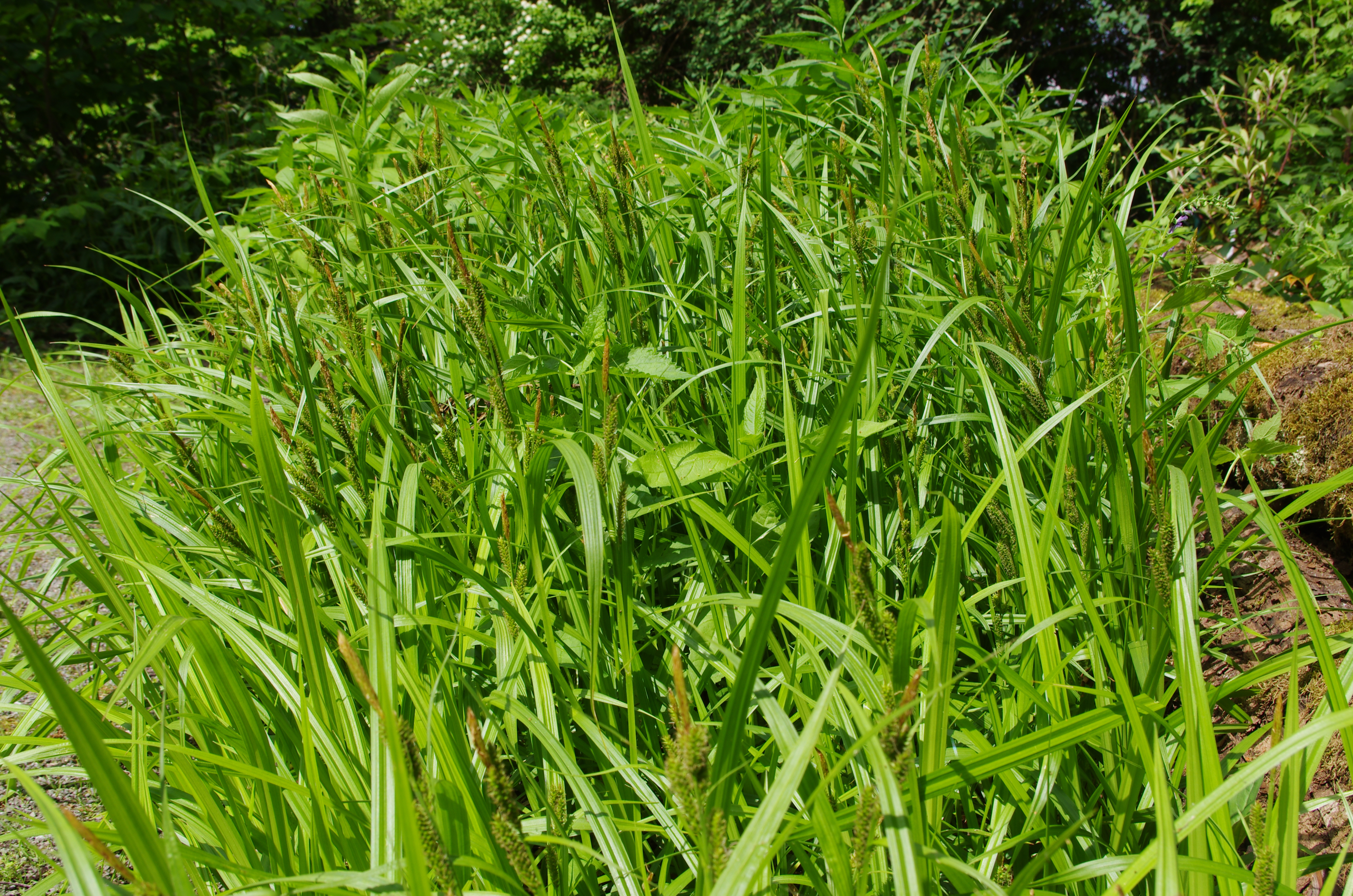
- Leaves

Conservation status
- Least Concern (IUCN 3.1)

Scientific classification
- Kingdom: Plantae
- Clade: Tracheophytes
- Clade: Angiosperms
- Clade: Monocots
- Clade: Commelinids
- Order: Poales
- Family: Cyperaceae
- Genus: Carex
- Species: C. scabrata

Binomial name
- Carex scabrata Schwein.

= Carex scabrata =

Species of plant

Carex scabrata, the eastern rough sedge, is a species of flowering plant in the family Cyperaceae. It is native to eastern Canada and the eastern United States (but in the southeast it is confined to the Appalachians), with one collection each in the Ozark and Ouachita Mountains. A perennial reaching 90 cm (3 ft), it is found it wet areas with rich soils, particularly on seepage slopes.
