= Trichosphaeriales =

Scientific classification
- Kingdom: Fungi
- Division: Ascomycota
- Class: Sordariomycetes
- Order: Trichosphaeriales; M.E.Barr (1983)
- Family: Trichosphaeriaceae; G. Winter, 1885

Families
- Trichosphaeriaceae; G.Winter (1885)

Order of fungi

The Trichosphaeriales are an order of sac fungi. It is monotypic, and consists of the single family, the Trichosphaeriaceae. In 2017, the family of Trichosphaeriaceae was placed in Diaporthomycetidae families incertae sedis, which was accepted by Wijayawardene et al. (2018), and Wijayawardene et al. 2020. The order of Trichosphaeriales was also unplaced. They are generally saprobic and pathogenic on plants, commonly isolated from herbivore dung.

== History ==
German mycologist Heinrich Georg Winter in 1887, introduced family Trichosphaeriaceae with Trichosphaeria as the type genus and seven other astromatic genera. These seven genera were later excluded from Trichosphaeriaceae family by molecular evidence. Margaret E. Barr then founded the Trichosphaeriales Order to hold the family in 1983. She then in 1990, accepted four genera in Trichosphaeriaceae, i.e. Acanthostigma, Eriosphaeria, Rhamphoria, and Trichosphaeria. Later, Acanthostigma was transferred to family Tubeufiaceae (Réblová & Barr 2000, Boonmee et al. 2011, 2014), while genus Rhamphoria was placed in family Annulatascaceae (Maharachchikumbura et al. 2016b), and then into family Rhamphoriaceae. Genera Collematospora was introduced by Jeng & Cain (1976) who assigned it to Trichosphaeriaceae based on the similar morphology with previously described genera, Eriosphaeria and Trichosphaeria in family Trichosphaeriaceae. Réblová in 1999, introduced Coniobrevicolla and placed it in Trichosphaeriaceae based on the characters of peridium, ascal and hamathecium anatomy. Réblová & Seifert in 2004, found some sexual morphs which produced Brachysporium asexual morphs in culture. On the basis of morphology of perithecia, asci, ascospores and conidiogenesis, genus Brachysporium was then placed in Trichosphaeriaceae. Pinnoi et al. in 2003 described Unisetosphaeria in Trichosphaeriaceae rather than family Chaetosphaeriaceae based on the morphology. Réblová & Gams in 2016 then studied the type material of Acanthosphaeria and relegated this genus to a synonym of genus Chaetosphaeria. Voglmayr et al. in 2019 transferred all genus Cresporhaphis species including the type to Leptosillia (Leptosilliaceae) and Rhaphidicyrtis (order Pyrenulales) except Cresporhaphis rhoina, although they did not give a clear classification for Cresporhaphis rhoina. Réblová et al. (2016b) recommended using the name Stromatographium rather than Fluviostroma because of its greater use and priority, and also accepted Stromatographium in order Sordariales. In multi-gene phylogenetic analyses of LSU, SSU, tef1 and rpb2 sequence data by Maharachchikumbura et al. in 2015, Trichosphaeriaceae had affinities with families Papulosaceae and Thyridiaceae, but they maintained Trichosphaeriaceae as a separate family. However, due to lacking molecular recognition of T. pilosa, the use of Trichosphaeriales in phylogenetic studies was not recommended by Réblová & Gams (2016). Hongsanan et al. in 2017 recognized Trichosphaeriaceae as family incertae sedis in class Diaporthomycetidae based on phylogenetic and molecular clock evidence, and this treatment was followed by Wijayawardene et al. (2018a).

== Hosts ==
Certain species in this family are coprophilic (dung loving), while other members are saprobic or pathogenic on plants, such as Chrysopogon zizanioides, Arenga engleri, and Ulmus minor. (Hudson 1963, Yanna et al. 1998, Calatayud & Aguirre-Hudson 2001).

== Genera ==
- Brachysporium
- Collematospora
- Coniobrevicolla
- Eriosphaeria
- Fluviostroma
- Kananascus
- Miyoshiella
- Neorehmia
- Oplothecium
- Pseudorhynchia
- Rizalia
- Schweinitziella
- Setocampanula
- Trichosphaeria
- Umbrinosphaeria
- Unisetosphaeria
