= Aquaticola =

Scientific classification
- Kingdom: Fungi
- Division: Ascomycota
- Class: Sordariomycetes
- Family: Annulatascaceae
- Genus: Aquaticola; W.H.Ho, K.M.Tsui, Hodgkiss & K.D.Hyde (1999)

Type species
- Aquaticola hyalomura W.H.Ho, K.M.Tsui, Hodgkiss & K.D.Hyde (1999)

Species
- See text

Genus of fungi

Aquaticola is a genus of fungi in the Cephalothecaceae family of the Ascomycota. The relationship of this taxon to other taxa within the Sordariomycetes class is unknown (incertae sedis), except that it is in subclass Diaporthomycetidae, and it has not yet been placed with certainty into any order.

== Species ==
As accepted by Species Fungorum;

- Aquaticola hyalomura W.H. Ho, C.K.M. Tsui, Hodgkiss & K.D. Hyde (1999)
- Aquaticola longicolla C.K.M. Tsui, Hodgkiss & K.D. Hyde (2003)
- Aquaticola minutiguttulata C.K.M. Tsui, Hodgkiss & K.D. Hyde (2003)
- Aquaticola triseptata C.K.M. Tsui, Hodgkiss & K.D. Hyde (2003)

Former species;

- A. ellipsoidea W.H. Ho, C.K.M. Tsui, Hodgkiss & K.D. Hyde (1999) = Atractospora ellipsoidea, Atractosporaceae family
