= Teracosphaeria =

Scientific classification
- Kingdom: Fungi
- Division: Ascomycota
- Class: Sordariomycetes
- Family: Annulatascaceae
- Genus: Teracosphaeria; Réblová & Seifert (2007)

Type species
- Teracosphaeria petroica Réblová & Seifert (2007)

Genus of fungi

Teracosphaeria is a fungal genus in the Annulatascaceae family of the Ascomycota. The relationship of this taxon to other taxa within the Sordariomycetes class is unknown (incertae sedis), and it has not yet been placed with certainty into any order. This is a monotypic genus, containing the single species Teracosphaeria petroica.
