= Submergence =

Submergence may refer to:

- Submergence (film), a 2017 film by Wim Wenders
- Submergence (novel), a 2012 book by J. M. Ledgard
- Submersion (disambiguation)

== See also ==
- Submerge (disambiguation)
- Deep-submergence vehicle
- Deep-submergence rescue vehicle
- Submersible
