= Fluminicola =

Fluminicola may refer to:

- Fluminicola (gastropod), a genus of minute freshwater snails in the family Lithoglyphidae
- Fluminicola (fungus), a genus of fungi in the family Papulosaceae
