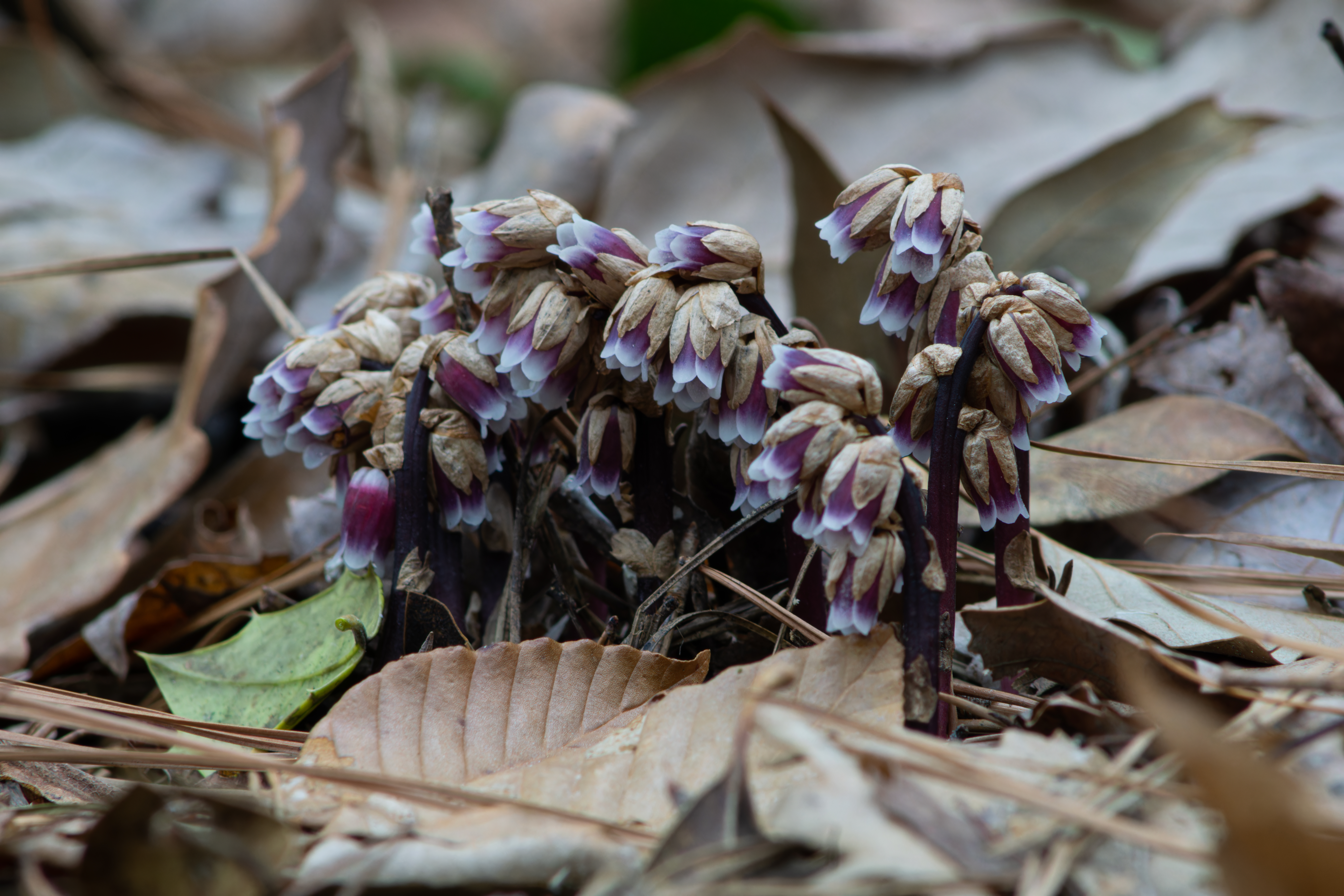

Conservation status
- Vulnerable (NatureServe)

Scientific classification
- Kingdom: Plantae
- Clade: Tracheophytes
- Clade: Angiosperms
- Clade: Eudicots
- Clade: Asterids
- Order: Ericales
- Family: Ericaceae
- Genus: Monotropsis
- Species: M. odorata

Binomial name
- Monotropsis odorata Schwein.

Synonyms
- Schweinitzia odorata

= Monotropsis odorata =

Plant species in the heath family

Monotropsis odorata, commonly known as Appalachian pigmy pipes, is a species of flowering plant in the genus Monotropsis, part of heath family.

== Description ==
Appalachian pigmy pipes is a small herbaceous plant with an above ground portion consisting entirely of inflorescences that grow to just 3 to 10 centimeters (1 to 4 in) in height. The inflorescence is a raceme, a group of flowers attached to a stem without branches, with flowers nods when emerging from the soil, begin to face upwards when blooming, and become fully upright when fruiting. Its stem is maroon to dark-purple in color and is covered in 14 to 66 bracts. It bracts are lavender colored when fresh and paper-like and tan when mature.

Their flowers are noticeably fragrant and this is used by observers to locate the plants. The odor can be reminiscent of cloves, nutmeg, cinnamon, or violets.

== Taxonomy ==
Monotropsis odorata was scientifically described and named in 1817 by Lewis David de Schweinitz. It is classified as part of the genus Monotropsis in the family Ericaceae. This genus is quite small, containing just one other species, Monotropsis reynoldsiae. It has no accepted varieties, but it has 7 synonyms according to Plants of the World Online.

Table of Synonyms
Name	Year	Rank	Notes
Cryptophila pudica W.Wolf	1922	species	= het.
Cryptophila pudica f. knapkei W.Wolf	1922	form	= het.
Cryptophila pudica f. maxima W.Wolf	1922	form	= het.
Monotropsis lehmaniae Burnham	1906	species	= het.
Monotropsis odorata var. lehmaniae (Burnham) H.E.Ahles	1964	variety	= het.
Schweinitzia caroliniana G.Don	1834	species	= het.
Schweinitzia odorata (Schwein.) Raf.	1818	species	≡ hom.
Notes: ≡ homotypic synonym; = heterotypic synonym

=== Names ===
Monotropsis odorata is known by the common names Appalachian pigmy pipes and Carolina beechdrops.
