= Pararamichloridium =

Scientific classification
- Kingdom: Fungi
- Division: Ascomycota
- Class: Sordariomycetes
- Subclass: Hypocreomycetidae
- Order: Pararamichloridiales; Crous
- Family: Pararamichloridiaceae; Crous
- Genus: Pararamichloridium; Crous

Type species
- Pararamichloridium livistonae Crous

Genus of fungi

Pararamichloridium is a genus of fungi in the monotypic family Pararamichloridiaceae and within the monotypic order Pararamichloridiales and also in the subclass Hypocreomycetidae. They are saprobic (processing of decayed (dead or waste) organic matter) on wood in terrestrial and freshwater habitats.

== History ==
In 2017, South African mycologist and plant pathologist Pedro Willem Crous published the order Pararamichloridiales which consisted of the monotypic family Pararamichloridiaceae and included the genera of Pararamichloridium and Woswasia. It also included Pararamichloridium livistonae as the type species of the genus.

Etymology. The species name livistonae refers to Livistona, the host genus of palms, from which this fungus was collected. While the genus name of Pararamichloridium refers to its morphological similarity to genus Ramichloridium, (from the Dissoconiaceae family, order Capnodiales and subclass of Dothideomycetidae,)

In the multi-loci ITS, LSU, SSU and rpb2 sequence data creating a phylogenetic tree, Pararamichloridium livistonae and Pararamichloridium verrucosum were shown to be grouped together and formed a separate clade. Although still located within class Sordariomycetes. The divergence time for Pararamichloridiales is estimated as 101.5 MYA (million years ago), which falls in the range of family status. Meanwhile fungal species, Woswasia atropurpurea, Xylochrysis lucida and Cyanoannulus petersenii formed a separate branch which was distant from Pararamichloridium clade. Zhang et al. (2017a) then excluded Woswasia from family Pararamichloridiaceae based on its close phylogenetic affinity with genera Xylochrysis and Cyanoannulus in family Woswasiaceae, in Diaporthomycetidae class incertae sedis. This was confirmed in later studies (Hyde et al. 2020a, b, c; and Wijayawardene et al. 2020).

In 2017, three species, Pararamichloridium caricicola, Pararamichloridium livistonae and Pararamichloridium verrucosum were accepted in this genus. Then Pararamichloridium aquisubtropicum J.Y. Zhang, Y.Z. Lu & K.D. Hyde was added in 2021, it was saprobic on submerged decaying wood within a freshwater stream in China.

== Description ==
Order Pararamichloridiales is characterised by branched, subhyaline (almost transparent) to brown, septate conidiophores, with polyblastic, terminal and intercalary (inserted between other elements or parts) conidiogenous cells that produce solitary, hyaline, aseptate, clavate to ellipsoid conidia.

Members of Pararamichloridiaceae are pathogenic on plant leaves (Crous et al. 2017, 2018). Such as in 2021, 12 fungal isolates that belong to 10 genera found on the banana plant were isolated, including Trichoderma, Pallidocercospora, Purpureocillium, Pallidocercospora, Mycosphaerella, Chaetomium, Neonectria, Pararamichloridium, Xylaria, and Neocordana.

The genus of Pararamichloridium is characterised as follows; The sexual morph is undetermined. The asexual morph has a mycelium (root-like structure) consisting of hyaline, smooth, septate, branched, hyphae. The conidiophores are erect, solitary, straight to flexuous, septate, branched at apex or not, sub-cylindrical, sub-hyaline to medium brown, smooth. The conidiogenous cells are terminal and intercalary, sub-cylindrical, sub-hyaline to medium brown, smooth, polyblastic and denticulate (having teeth-like structures, or denticles). The denticles have slightly thickened scars. The conidia are solitary, hyaline, smooth, granular, aseptate, thin-walled, clavate to ellipsoid in shape.

== Distribution ==
They are found on the island of Borneo in Indonesia, and also from Australia and India.

== Species ==
4 species have accepted by Species Fungorum;

- Pararamichloridium aquisubtropicum J.Y. Zhang, Y.Z. Lu & K.D. Hyde (2020)
- Pararamichloridium caricicola Crous (2018)
- Pararamichloridium livistonae Crous (2017)
- Pararamichloridium verrucosum (V. Rao & de Hoog) Crous (2017)

While GBIF only accepts 3 species,Pararamichloridium caricicola, Pararamichloridium livistonae and Pararamichloridium verrucosum.
