= Lentomitella unipretoriae =

Scientific classification
- Domain: Eukaryota
- Kingdom: Fungi
- Division: Ascomycota
- Class: Sordariomycetes
- Order: Xenospadicoidales
- Family: Xenospadicoidaceae
- Genus: Lentomitella
- Species: L. unipretoriae

Binomial name
- Lentomitella unipretoriae M.J. Wingfield, Marincowitz & Crous, 2008

Species of fungus

Lentomitella unipretoriae is a fungus that was named after the University of Pretoria. This discovery makes the University of Pretoria the first university in the world with a fungus named after it.

== Latin diagnosis ==
Lentomitellae cirrhosae similis, sed ascosporis maioribus, 8-10(-11) x 4-5 µm, distinguenda.
