= Kananaskis =

Kananaskis may refer to:

== Geography ==
- Kananaskis Country, a park system in Alberta, Canada
- Kananaskis Range, a mountain range in Kananaskis Country
- Kananaskis River, a mountain river in Kananaskis Country
- Kananaskis Lakes
  - Lower Kananaskis Lake
  - Upper Kananaskis Lake
- Kananaskis Provincial Park, now known as Peter Lougheed Provincial Park

== Communities ==
- Kananaskis, Alberta, an unincorporated community on Highway 1A in the Municipal District of Bighorn No. 8
- Kananaskis Village, Alberta, an unincorporated community on Highway 40 (Kananaskis Trail) in Kananaskis Country
- Kananaskis Improvement District (No. 5), an administrative district in the Alberta Rockies

== See also ==
- 28th G8 summit, or Kananaskis Summit, a 2002 political leaders meeting
- Kananascus, a genus of fungi
