= Pteridiospora =

Scientific classification
- Kingdom: Fungi
- Division: Ascomycota
- Class: Dothideomycetes
- Subclass: incertae sedis
- Genus: Pteridiospora; Penz. & Sacc. (1897)

Type species
- Pteridiospora javanica Penz. & Sacc. (1897)

Species
- P. chochrjakovii P. javanica P. munkii P. spinosispora

Genus of fungi

Pteridiospora is a genus of fungi in the class Dothideomycetes. The relationship of this taxon to other taxa within the class is unknown (incertae sedis).

== See also ==
- List of Dothideomycetes genera incertae sedis
