= Fusoidispora =

Scientific classification
- Kingdom: Fungi
- Division: Ascomycota
- Class: Sordariomycetes
- Family: Annulatascaceae
- Genus: Fusoidispora; Vijaykr., Jeewon & K.D.Hyde (2005)

Type species
- Fusoidispora aquatica Vijaykr., Jeewon & K.D.Hyde (2005)

Synonyms
- Torrentispora aquatica (Vijaykr., Jeewon & K.D. Hyde) Réblová & A.N. Mill.

Genus of fungi

Fusoidispora is a fungal genus in the Annulatascaceae family of the Ascomycota. The relationship of this taxon to other taxa within the Sordariomycetes class is unknown (incertae sedis), except that it is in subclass Diaporthomycetidae, and it has not yet been placed with certainty into any order. This is a monotypic genus, containing the single species Fusoidispora aquatica.
