= Fluminicola bipolaris =

Scientific classification
- Domain: Eukaryota
- Kingdom: Fungi
- Division: Ascomycota
- Class: Sordariomycetes
- Family: Papulosaceae
- Genus: Fluminicola
- Species: F. bipolaris

Binomial name
- Fluminicola bipolaris S.W.Wong, K.D.Hyde & E.B.G.Jones (1998)

Species of fungus

Fluminicola bipolaris is a fungal species in the family Papulosaceae of the Ascomycota. It was the only known species in the genus Fluminicola until 4 more new species were found in 2017 and 2021.
