= Diluviicola =

Scientific classification
- Kingdom: Fungi
- Division: Ascomycota
- Class: Sordariomycetes
- Order: Atractosporales
- Family: Pseudoproboscisporaceae
- Genus: Diluviicola K.D.Hyde, S.W. Wong & E.B.G.Jones (1998)
- Species: D. capensis

Binomial name
- Diluviicola capensis K.D.Hyde, S.W.Wong & E.B.G.Jones (1998)

Genus of fungi

Diluviicola is a genus of fungi in the family Pseudoproboscisporaceae and order Atractosporales, within the subclass Diaporthomycetidae.

Diluviicola is monotypic, containing the single species Diluviicola capensis, described as new to science in 1998. It was found on submerged wood in fresh water in Brunei.

In 2017, another species was found Diluviicola aquatica W. Dong, Huang Zhang & K.D. Hyde but it was transferred to another genus in the family, Neodiluviicola aquatica, Pseudoproboscisporaceae in 2021.

The relationship of this taxon to other taxa within the Sordariomycetes class was unknown (incertae sedis) in 2007, and it had not yet been placed with certainty into any order, until further analysis in 2020.
