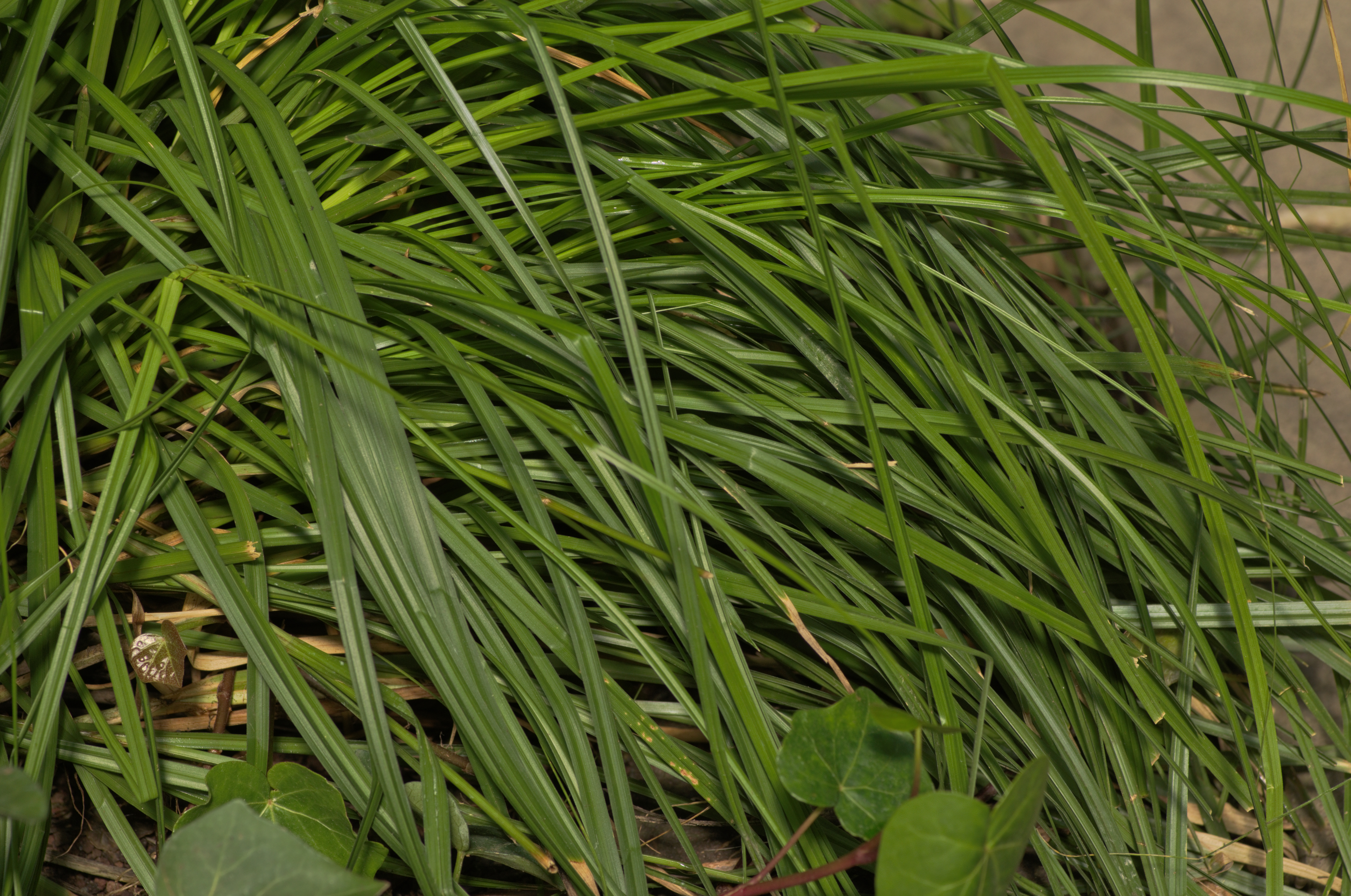
- At the Ecological-Botanical Garden of the University of Bayreuth
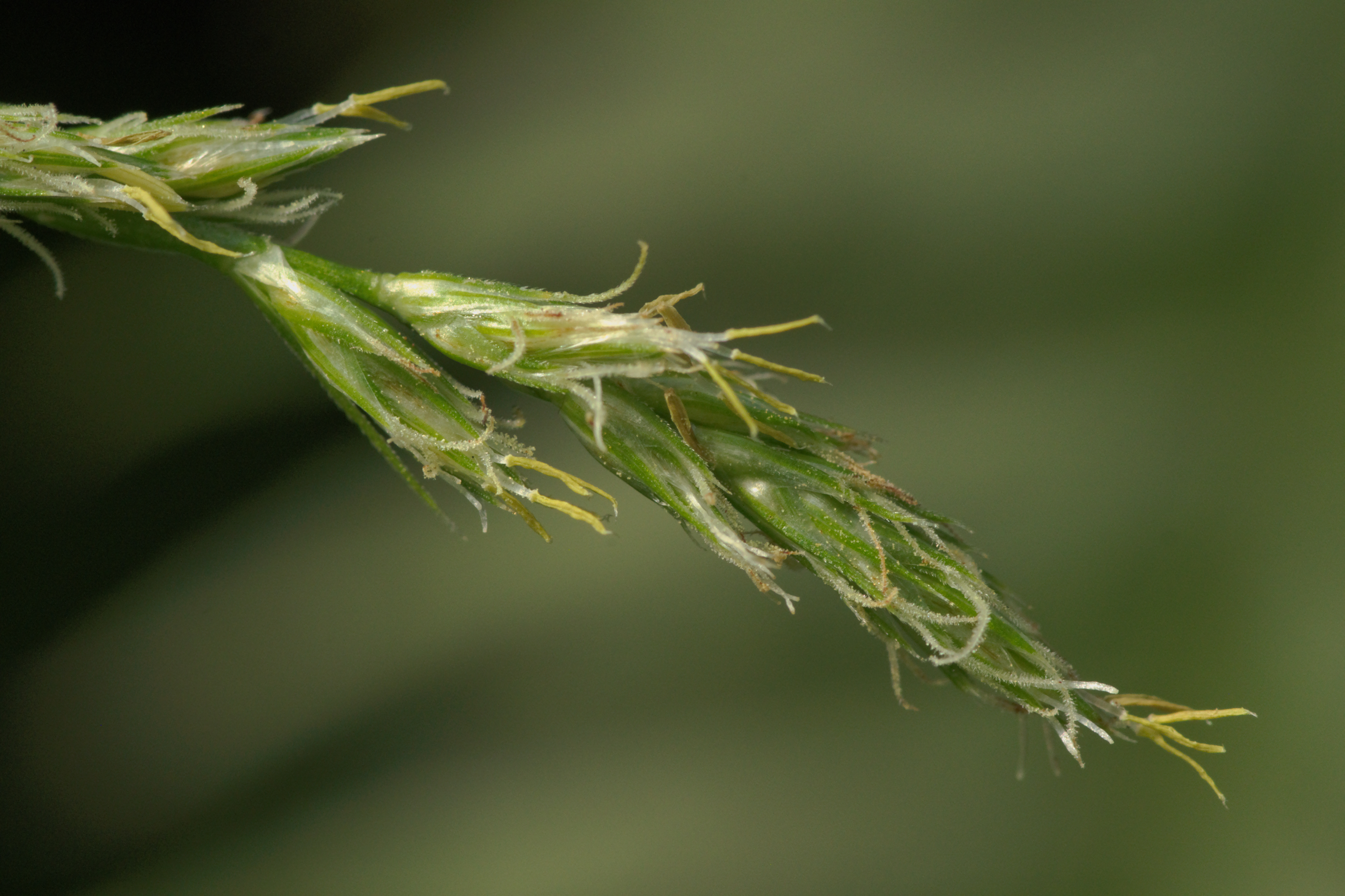
- Close-up of flowers

Scientific classification
- Kingdom: Plantae
- Clade: Tracheophytes
- Clade: Angiosperms
- Clade: Monocots
- Clade: Commelinids
- Order: Poales
- Family: Cyperaceae
- Genus: Carex
- Species: C. canariensis

Binomial name
- Carex canariensis Kük.

Synonyms
- Vignea canariensis (Kük.) Soják

= Carex canariensis =

Species of flowering plant

Carex canariensis is a species of sedge in the family Cyperaceae, native to the island of Madeira and to the Canary Islands. Its chromosome number is 2n = 58.
