= Pseudorhynchia =

Scientific classification
- Kingdom: Fungi
- Division: Ascomycota
- Class: Sordariomycetes
- Order: Trichosphaeriales
- Family: Trichosphaeriaceae
- Genus: Pseudorhynchia; Höhn. (1909)

Type species
- Pseudorhynchia polyrhyncha (Penz. & Sacc.) Höhn. (1909)

Species
- P. mauritiana P. polyrrhyncha

Genus of fungi

Pseudorhynchia is a genus of fungi in the family Trichosphaeriaceae. There are two species, P. mauritiana and P. polyrrhyncha.
