= Umbrinosphaeria =

Scientific classification
- Kingdom: Fungi
- Division: Ascomycota
- Class: Sordariomycetes
- Order: Trichosphaeriales
- Family: Trichosphaeriaceae
- Genus: Umbrinosphaeria; Réblová (1999)

Type species
- Umbrinosphaeria caesariata (Clinton & Peck) Réblová (1999)

Synonyms
- Sphaeria caesariata Cooke & Peck (1878); Lasiosphaeria caesariata (Cooke & Peck) Sacc. (1883); Phaeotrichosphaeria caesariata (Cooke & Peck) M.E.Barr (1986); Chaetosphaeria caesariata (Clinton & Peck) F.A.Fernández & Huhndorf (2005)

Genus of fungi

Umbrinosphaeria is a genus of lignicolous fungi in the family Trichosphaeriaceae. This is a monotypic genus, containing the single species Umbrinosphaeria caesariata.
