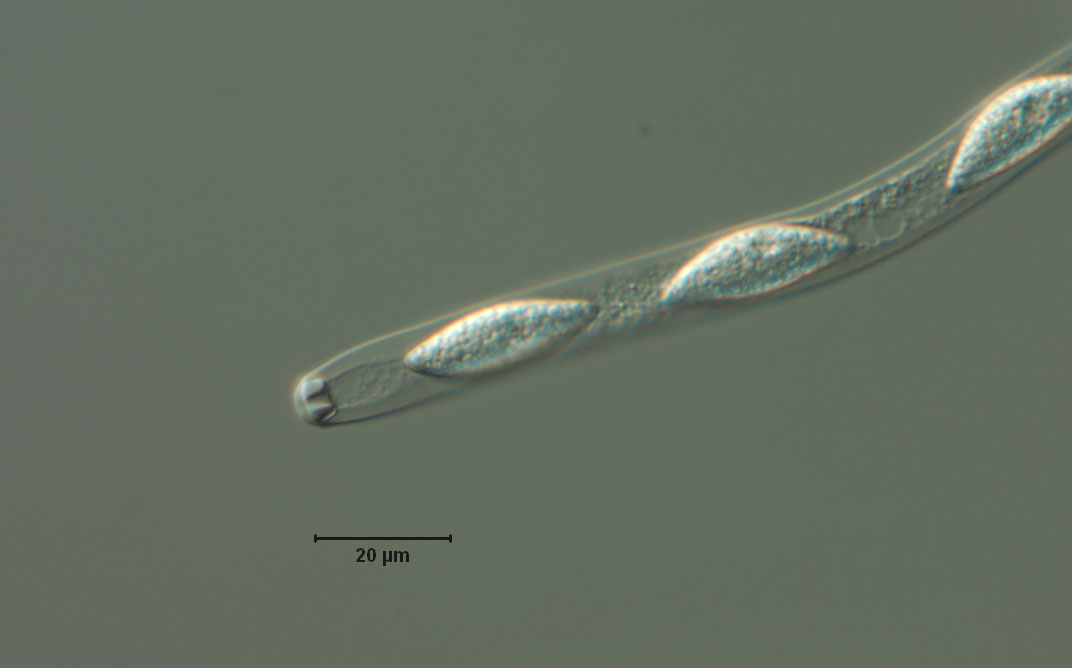
- Annulatascus velatisporus ascus and apical ring

Scientific classification
- Kingdom: Fungi
- Division: Ascomycota
- Class: Sordariomycetes
- Family: Annulatascaceae
- Genus: Annulatascus; K.D.Hyde (1992)

Type species
- Annulatascus velatisporus K.D.Hyde (1992)

= Annulatascus =

Genus of fungi

Annulatascus is a genus of fungi in the Annulatascaceae family of the Ascomycota. The relationship of this taxon to other taxa within the Sordariomycetes class is unknown (incertae sedis), and it has not yet been placed with certainty into any order. The genus is characterized by taxa that are saprobic on submerged, decaying plant material in freshwater habitats. Morphologically the taxa possess dark brown to black perithecia, long tapering hyaline septate paraphyses, eight-spored asci with relatively massive J− apical rings, and ascospores that may or may not possess gelatinous sheaths or appendages. There are currently 17 species included in the genus.

== Taxonomy ==
Annulatascus is a genus established by mycologist Kevin D. Hyde in 1992, who created it to accommodate Annulatascus velatisporus, the type species of the genus.

== Species ==
Mycobank currently lists 19 names, one of which has been transferred to another genus, and another that is a spelling variant, as species of Annulatascus. Thus there are 17 recognized species.

- Annulatascus apiculatus F.R.Barbosa & Gusmão (2009)
- Annulatascus aquaticus W.H.Ho, K.D.Hyde & Hodgkiss (1999)
- Annulatascus aquatorba Boonyuen & Sri-indrasutdhi (2012)
- Annulatascus biatriisporus K.D.Hyde (1995)
- Annulatascus citriosporus J.Fröhl. & K.D.Hyde (2000)
- Annulatascus fusiformis K.D.Hyde & S.W.Wong (2000)
- Annulatascus hongkongensisW.H.Ho, Ranghoo, K.D.Hyde & Hodgkiss (1999)
- Annulatascus joannae K.M.Tsui, Hodgkiss & K.D.Hyde (2002)
- Annulatascus lacteus K.M.Tsui, Hodgkiss & K.D.Hyde (2002)
- Annulatascus licaulae J.Fröhl. & K.D.Hyde (2000)
- Annulatascus liputii L.Cai & K.D.Hyde (2002)
- Annulatascus menglensis D.M.Hu, L.Cai & K.D.Hyde (2012)
- Annulatascus nilensis Abdel-Wahab & Abdel-Aziz (2011)
- Annulatascus palmietensis Goh, K.D.Hyde & Steinke (1998)
- Annulatascus triseptatus S.W.Wong, K.D.Hyde & E.B.G.Jones (1999)
- Annulatascus tropicalis Ranghoo & K.D.Hyde (2002)
- Annulatascus velatisporus K.D.Hyde (1992)
