= Ayria (fungus) =

Scientific classification
- Kingdom: Fungi
- Division: Ascomycota
- Class: Sordariomycetes
- Family: Annulatascaceae
- Genus: Ayria; Fryar & K.D.Hyde (2004)

Type species
- Ayria appendiculata Fryar & K.D.Hyde (2004)

Species
- A. appendiculata A. nubispora

Genus of fungi

Ayria is a genus of fungi in the family Annulatascaceae of the Ascomycota. The relationship of this taxon to other taxa within the Sordariomycetes class is unknown (incertae sedis), and it has not yet been placed with certainty into any order.
