= Submersion =

Submersion may refer to:

- Being or going underwater, as via submarine, underwater diving, or scuba diving
- Submersion (coastal management), the sustainable cyclic portion of foreshore erosion
- Submersion (mathematics)
- Submersion (Stargate Atlantis), an episode of the television series Stargate Atlantis

== See also ==
- Submerge (disambiguation)
- Submergence (disambiguation)
- Immersion (disambiguation)
