= Torrentispora =

Scientific classification
- Domain: Eukaryota
- Kingdom: Fungi
- Division: Ascomycota
- Class: Sordariomycetes
- Order: Xenospadicoidales
- Family: Xenospadicoidaceae
- Genus: Torrentispora; K.D.Hyde, W.H.Ho, E.B.G.Jones, K.M.Tsui & S.W.Wong (2000)

Species
- T. crassiparietis; T. fibrosa; T. fusiformis

Genus of fungi

Torrentispora is a genus of fungi in the family Xenospadicoidaceae of the Ascomycota.

Until 2017, the relationship of this taxon to other taxa within the Sordariomycetes class was unknown (incertae sedis). In 2017, it was placed within the family Xenospadicoidaceae, the only member of the monotypic order Xenospadicoidales.
