= Annulusmagnus =

Scientific classification
- Kingdom: Fungi
- Division: Ascomycota
- Class: Sordariomycetes
- Family: Annulatascaceae
- Genus: Annulusmagnus; J.Campb. & Shearer (2004)

Type species
- Annulusmagnus triseptatus (S.W.Wong, K.D.Hyde & E.B.G.Jones) J.Campb. & Shearer (2004)

Genus of fungi

Annulusmagnus is a genus of fungi in the Cephalothecaceae family of the Ascomycota. The relationship of this taxon to other taxa within the Sordariomycetes class is unknown (incertae sedis), and it has not yet been placed with certainty into any order. This is a monotypic genus, containing the single species Annulusmagnus triseptatus.
