= Pteridiospora spinosispora =

Scientific classification
- Kingdom: Fungi
- Division: Ascomycota
- Class: Dothideomycetes
- Genus: Pteridiospora
- Species: P. spinosispora

Binomial name
- Pteridiospora spinosispora Filer (1969)

Species of fungus

Pteridiospora spinosispora is a species of fungus in the class Dothideomycetes.

== Taxonomy ==
The fungus was discovered in 1963, isolated from the mycorrhizae of sweetgum (Liquidambar styraciflua). The type locality was near the Mississippi River in northern Mississippi; it was later reported growing with the roots of green ash (Fraxinus pennsylvanica). The species was first mentioned in a 1966 report, where it was described as an "unidentified sphaeriaceous ascomycete". Filer formally described the fungus in 1969.

== Description ==
The fruitbodies of the fungus are small, dull black, and spherical, measuring 114–251 by 114–251 μm, with thick walls (up to 24 μm); They occur singly or in dense groups. Underlying the fruitbodies is a small, thin-walled mat of mycelium. The club-shaped asci (spore-bearing cells) measure 85 by 25 μm. The ascospores are black and spiny, measuring 21–25 by 12–20 μm (with the spines 2–5 μm); they contain a single septum. The ornamented spores clearly distinguish P. spinosispora from other members of Pteridiospora.
