= Ceratostomella =

Scientific classification
- Kingdom: Fungi
- Division: Ascomycota
- Class: Sordariomycetes
- Family: Annulatascaceae
- Genus: Ceratostomella; Sacc. 1878

Genus of fungi

Ceratostomella is a genus of fungi in the Annulatascaceae family of the Ascomycota. The relationship of this taxon to other taxa within the Sordariomycetes class is unknown (incertae sedis), and it has not yet been placed with certainty into any order.

== Species ==
- Ceratostomella acoma
- Ceratostomella albocoronata
- Ceratostomella bambusina
- Ceratostomella buxi
- Ceratostomella canulata
- Ceratostomella capillaris
- Ceratostomella capilliformis
- Ceratostomella castaneae
- Ceratostomella catoniana
- Ceratostomella comata
- Ceratostomella conica
- Ceratostomella coprogena
- Ceratostomella cuspidata
- Ceratostomella debaryana
- Ceratostomella defectiva
- Ceratostomella dispersa
- Ceratostomella dubia
- Ceratostomella echinata
- Ceratostomella echinella
- Ceratostomella excelsior
- Ceratostomella exigua
- Ceratostomella fallax
- Ceratostomella fuscolutea
- Ceratostomella hyalocoronata
- Ceratostomella hyalostoma
- Ceratostomella hydrophila
- Ceratostomella hystricina
- Ceratostomella imperfecta
- Ceratostomella investita
- Ceratostomella leptographioides
- Ceratostomella leptorrhyncha
- Ceratostomella lignorum
- Ceratostomella maderensis
- Ceratostomella majuscula
- Ceratostomella mali
- Ceratostomella merolinensis
- Ceratostomella microcarpa
- Ceratostomella multirostrata
- Ceratostomella mycophila
- Ceratostomella nyssicola
- Ceratostomella piceiperda
- Ceratostomella polyrrhyncha
- Ceratostomella pseudotsugae
- Ceratostomella pyrenaica
- Ceratostomella rhynchophora
- Ceratostomella rostrocylindrica
- Ceratostomella schrenkiana
- Ceratostomella similis
- Ceratostomella stricta
- Ceratostomella subdenudata
- Ceratostomella subpilosa
- Ceratostomella subsalsa
- Ceratostomella trichina
- Ceratostomella triseptata
- Ceratostomella unedonis
