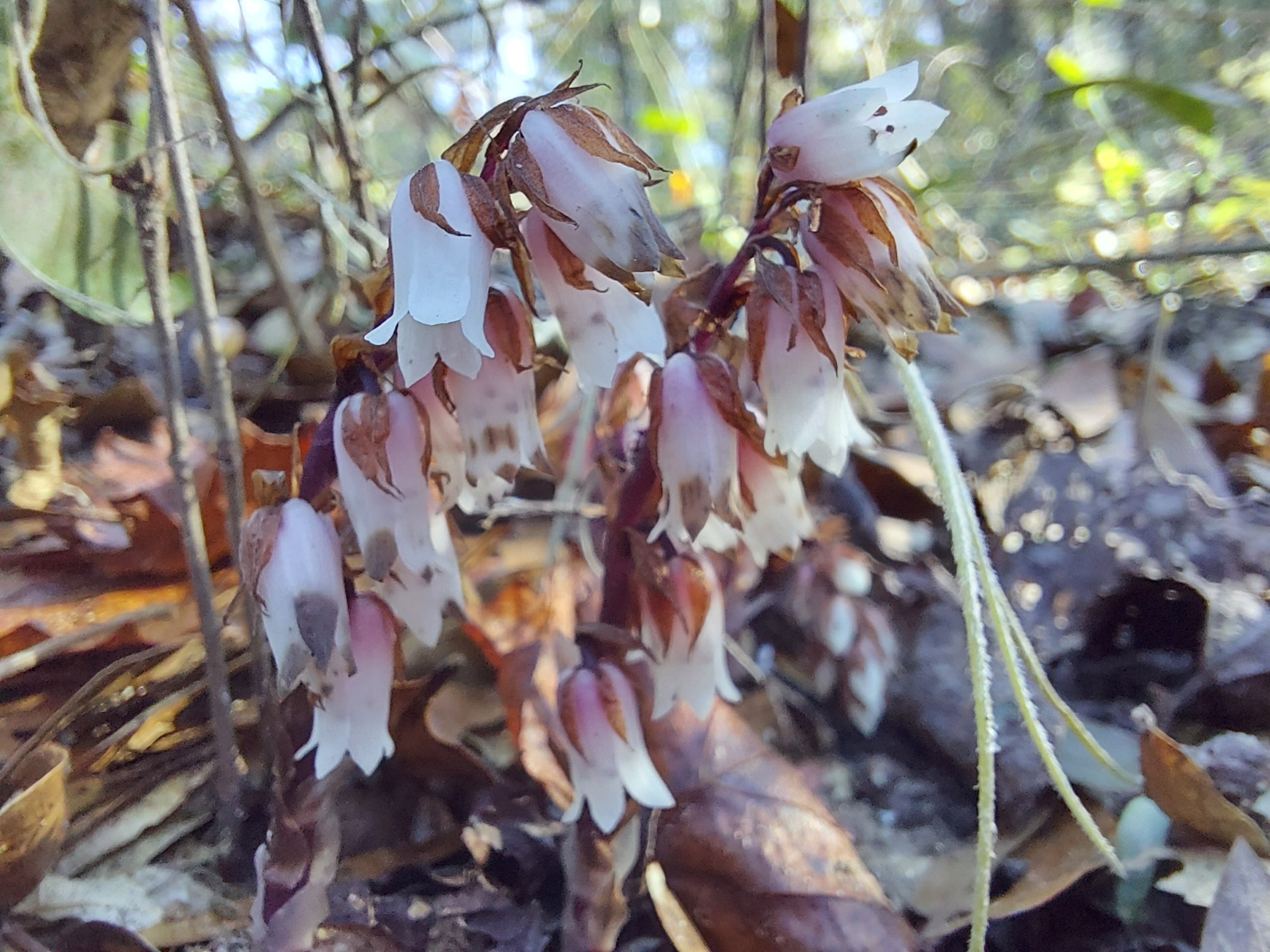
- In Citrus County, Florida

Scientific classification
- Kingdom: Plantae
- Clade: Tracheophytes
- Clade: Angiosperms
- Clade: Eudicots
- Clade: Asterids
- Order: Ericales
- Family: Ericaceae
- Genus: Monotropsis
- Species: M. reynoldsiae

Binomial name
- Monotropsis reynoldsiae (A.Gray) A.Heller

Synonyms
- Schweinitzia reynoldsiae

= Monotropsis reynoldsiae =

Plant species in the heath family

Monotropsis reynoldsiae, also known as Florida sand pipes, is a species of flowering plant in the heath family.

== Description ==
Florida sand pipes has an above ground portion that is a type of unbranched inflorescence called a raceme. Each inflorescence has four to sixteen flowers all facing the same direction. The stem is dark purple-black, although the lower portions where it is covered by leaves and humus will be pinkish to white in color. When first emerging the soil the flower buds are erect, but they nod, facing downward, when blooming. At the conclusion of blooming the fruits once again face upwards. The plants have no leaves, but the flowering stems will have 20 to 57 bracts that are the same dark purple as the stems when flowering and somewhat tan when fruiting.

The flowers have five sepals that are oblong in shape with paper-like texture and tan color. The petals are fused into a corolla with five lobes and emerge from the sepals. They are not fleshy and are white in color with a pinkish tinge towards the base in some individuals. Each flower has ten stamens with somewhat pink filaments 2.2–5.1 millimeters long and tipped with yellow pollen.

== Taxonomy ==
Monotropsis reynoldsiae was scientifically described and named Schweinitzia reynoldsiae in 1885 by Asa Gray. In 1898 Amos Arthur Heller moved it to the genus Monotropsis giving the species its accepted name. Until the 2010s it was often considered a synonym of Monotropsis odorata. In 2014 Jeffrey P. Rose and John V. Freudenstein concluded on the basis of DNA evidence that it was a distinct species. It is classified in the family Ericaceae. It has no subspecies or varieties.

=== Names ===
Monotropsis reynoldsiae is known by the common names Florida sand pipes and Florida beechdrops. The name Florida pygmy pipes has also been suggested for the species.

== Range and habitat ==
The species is endemic to the state of Florida in the United States. There it is found in north central parts of the peninsula in the counties of St. Johns, Marion, Citrus, Hernando, Pasco, and Volusia. It grows in upland areas such as mixed hardwood forests, mesic and xeric hammocks, and scrub. Like Monotropsis odorata it tends to grow areas with deep accumulations of fallen leaves.
