= Ascitendus =

Scientific classification
- Kingdom: Fungi
- Division: Ascomycota
- Class: Sordariomycetes
- Family: Annulatascaceae
- Genus: Ascitendus; J.Campb. & Shearer (2004)

Type species
- Ascitendus austriacus (Réblová, Winka & Jaklitsch) J.Campb. & Shearer (2004)

Genus of fungi

Ascitendus is a genus of fungi in the family Cephalothecaceae of the Ascomycota. The relationship of this taxon to other taxa within the Sordariomycetes is unknown (incertae sedis), and it has not yet been placed with certainty into any order. This is a monotypic genus, containing the single species Ascitendus austriacus.
