= Fluviostroma =

Scientific classification
- Kingdom: Fungi
- Division: Ascomycota
- Class: Sordariomycetes
- Order: Trichosphaeriales
- Family: Trichosphaeriaceae
- Genus: Fluviostroma; Samuels & E.Müll. (1980)

Type species
- Fluviostroma wrightii Samuels & E.Müll. (1980)

Genus of fungi

Fluviostroma is a fungal genus in the family Trichosphaeriaceae. This is a monotypic genus, containing the single species Fluviostroma wrightii. The genus was circumscribed by G.J. Samuel and E. Mueller in 1980.
