= Lentomitella =

Scientific classification
- Domain: Eukaryota
- Kingdom: Fungi
- Division: Ascomycota
- Class: Sordariomycetes
- Order: Xenospadicoidales
- Family: Xenospadicoidaceae
- Genus: Lentomitella; Höhnel, 1906

Species
- See text

Genus of fungus

Lentomitella is a genus of fungus in the family Xenospadicoidaceae.

== Species ==
The following species are accepted within Lentomitella:

- Lentomitella cirrhosa
- Lentomitella conoidea
- Lentomitella crinigera
- Lentomitella investita
- Lentomitella magna
- Lentomitella obscura
- Lentomitella pallibrunnea
- Lentomitella striatella
- Lentomitella sulcata
- Lentomitella tenuirostris
- Lentomitella tomentosa
- Lentomitella tropica
- Lentomitella unipretoriae
- Lentomitella vestita
