= Oplothecium =

Scientific classification
- Kingdom: Fungi
- Division: Ascomycota
- Class: Sordariomycetes
- Order: Trichosphaeriales
- Family: Trichosphaeriaceae
- Genus: Oplothecium; Syd. & P.Syd. (1914)

Species
- O. arecae O. palmae

Genus of fungi

Oplothecium is a genus of fungi in the family Trichosphaeriaceae.
