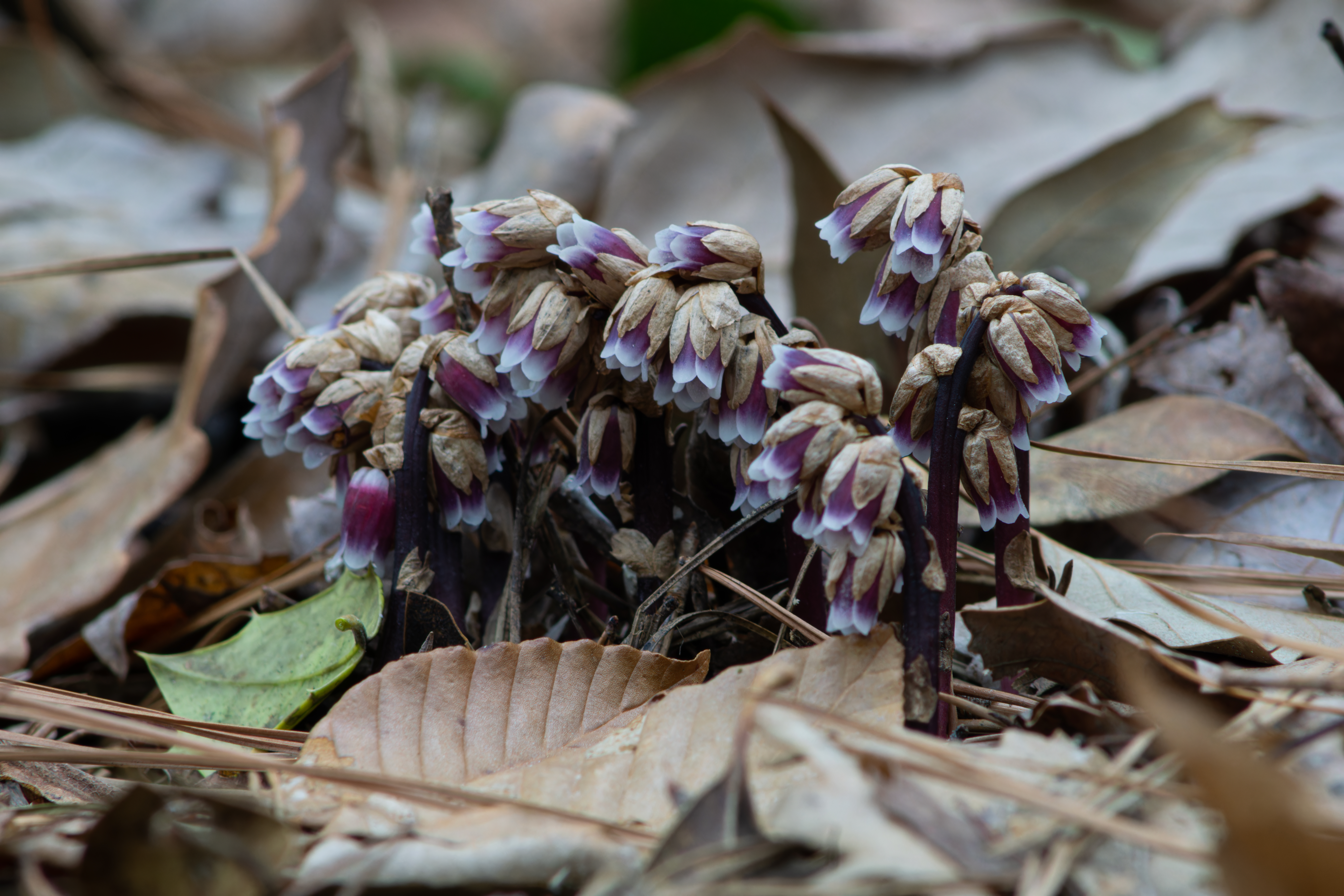
- Monotropsis odorata

Scientific classification
- Kingdom: Plantae
- Clade: Tracheophytes
- Clade: Angiosperms
- Clade: Eudicots
- Clade: Asterids
- Order: Ericales
- Family: Ericaceae
- Subfamily: Monotropoideae
- Tribe: Monotropeae
- Genus: Monotropsis; Schwein. ex Elliott

Species
- See text

Synonyms
- Schweinitzia Elliott ex Nutt.; Cryptophila W.Wolf

= Monotropsis =

Plant genus in the heath family

Monotropsis is a small genus of just two flowering plants in the family Ericaceae, Monotropsis odorata and Monotropsis reynoldsiae. They are native to the southeastern United States.

Like all members of the subfamily called the monotropes, the species in Monotropsis do not contain chlorophyll. They are myco-heterotrophs, getting its food through parasitism upon fungi rather than photosynthesis. These fungi form a mycorrhiza with nearby tree species.

== Description ==
Monotropsis are small herbaceous plants without leaves. They can grow as colonies or as a single plant in the ground. They spread by rhizomes, ground adapted stems, that are wiry and somewhat fleshy when young and become brittle when older. The roots are adventitious, growing from nodes on the rhizomes, and are purple when old and mostly white when young. They are heavily covered in mats of fungal mycelia. Small whitish buds covered in imbricate scales, ones that overlap with each other, develop at intervals on the roots. These develop into the inflorescences and when mature are much thicker and quite different from the roots.

The inflorescence is a raceme, an unbranched group of flowers that can grow indeterminately, with a stem that can be deep purple to maroon in color. Each one will have two to sixteen nodding flowers. Each flower will usually have five sepals that are tan and paper-like. The petals are united into a corolla with five lobes and each flower has ten stamens.

== Taxonomy ==
Monotropsis was scientifically described and named by the botanist Stephen Elliott in 1817 who attributed his description to Lewis David de Schweinitz. It is classified as part of the subfamily Monotropoideae within the family Ericaceae. When the Flora of North America volume 8 was published in 2009 Gary D. Wallace described the genus as containing one species. In 2014 Jeffrey P. Rose and John V. Freudenstein concluded on the basis of DNA evidence that it was actually two distinct species. The two accepted species are Monotropsis odorata and Monotropsis reynoldsiae.

== Range ==
The species of Monotropsis are native to ten states in the southeast of the United States; Alabama, Delaware, Florida, Georgia, Kentucky, Maryland, North Carolina, South Carolina, Tennessee, and Virginia.
