= Submerge =

Submerge (and its variants) means to be covered by something (usually a liquid), such as being underwater:

- Submerged arc welding
- Submerged continent
- Submerged forest
- Submerged floating tunnel
- Submerged places, various locations
- Submerged specific gravity
- Submergent coastline
- Submergent plant
- Submersible
- Submersible bridge
- Submersible drilling rig
- Submersible mixer
- Submersisphaeria, submerged fungi genus
- Ceratophyllum submersum, submerged, free-floating, aquatic plant
- the action of a submarine of diving below the surface of water

Submerge, Submerged, or Submersed may also refer to:

- Submerge, 1998 album by the Japanese alternative rock band Coaltar of the Deepers
- Submerge (nightclub), Indian nightclub
- Submerged (2000 film), a 2000 film
- Submerged (2005 film), a 2005 film
- Submerged (2016 film), a 2016 film
- Submerged (video game), a 2015 video game
- Submerged, a one-act play written in 1929 by Clay Shaw and Herman Stuart Cottman
- Submerged, a 2001 TV movie docudrama about the USS Squalus (SS-192)
- Submerged (DJ), alias of Kurt Gluck, Brooklyn-based disc jockey
- Submerged Records, a record label
- Submersed, American rock band

== See also ==
- Submersion (disambiguation)
- Drown
- Flood
- Reservoir
- Aquis Submersus (Latin for Water Drowning), painting and novella
