= Rhamphoria =

Scientific classification
- Kingdom: Fungi
- Division: Ascomycota
- Class: Sordariomycetes
- Family: Annulatascaceae
- Genus: Rhamphoria; Niessl (1876)

Type species
- Rhamphoria delicatula Niessl (1876)

Species
- R. bevanii R. delicatula R. pyriformis R. separata R. tympanidispora

Genus of fungi

Rhamphoria is a genus of fungi in the Annulatascaceae family of the Ascomycota. The relationship of this taxon to other taxa within the Sordariomycetes class is unknown (incertae sedis), and it has not yet been placed with certainty into any order. The genus, circumscribed by the Austrian mycologist Gustav Niessl von Mayendorf in 1876, contains nine species.
