= Fluminicola (fungus) =

Scientific classification
- Kingdom: Fungi
- Division: Ascomycota
- Class: Sordariomycetes
- Family: Papulosaceae
- Genus: Fluminicola; S.W.Wong, K.D.Hyde & E.B.G.Jones (1998)

Type species
- Fluminicola bipolaris S.W.Wong, K.D.Hyde & E.B.G.Jones (1998)

Species of fungus

Fluminicola is a fungal genus in the family Papulosaceae of the Ascomycota. The relationship of this taxon to other taxa within the Sordariomycetes class is unknown (incertae sedis), and it has not yet been placed with certainty into any order. This was a monotypic genus, containing the single species Fluminicola bipolaris until new species were found in 2017 and 2021.

It was originally placed in the Annulatascaceae family but in 2020 it was placed in the Papulosaceae family due to an updated classification.

== Species ==
As accepted by Species Fungorum;

- Fluminicola aquatica W. Dong, Huang Zhang & K.D. Hyde (2017)
- Fluminicola bipolaris S.W. Wong, K.D. Hyde & E.B.G. Jones (1999)
- Fluminicola saprophytica W. Dong, H. Zhang & K.D. Hyde (2017)
- Fluminicola striata X.D. Yu, W. Dong & H. Zhang (2021)
- Fluminicola thailandensis W. Dong, H. Zhang & K.D. Hyde (2017)
