= Setocampanula =

Scientific classification
- Kingdom: Fungi
- Division: Ascomycota
- Class: Sordariomycetes
- Order: Trichosphaeriales
- Family: Trichosphaeriaceae
- Genus: Setocampanula; Sivan. & W.H.Hsieh (1989)

Type species
- Setocampanula taiwanensis Sivan. & W.H.Hsieh (1989)

Genus of fungi

Setocampanula is a fungal genus in the family Trichosphaeriaceae. This is a monotypic genus, containing the single species Setocampanula taiwanensis.
