= Rizalia =

Scientific classification
- Kingdom: Fungi
- Division: Ascomycota
- Class: Sordariomycetes
- Order: Trichosphaeriales
- Family: Trichosphaeriaceae
- Genus: Rizalia; Syd. & P.Syd. (1914)

Type species
- Rizalia fasciculata Syd. & P.Syd. (1914)

Species
- R. byrsonimae R. confusa R. fasciculata R. glaziovii

Genus of fungi

Rizalia is a genus of fungi in the family Trichosphaeriaceae.
