= Unisetosphaeria =

Scientific classification
- Kingdom: Fungi
- Division: Ascomycota
- Class: Sordariomycetes
- Order: Trichosphaeriales
- Family: Trichosphaeriaceae
- Genus: Unisetosphaeria; Pinnoi, E.B.G.Jones, McKenzie & K.D.Hyde (2003)

Type species
- Unisetosphaeria penguinoides Pinnoi, E.B.G.Jones, McKenzie & K.D.Hyde (2003)

Genus of fungi

Unisetosphaeria is a fungal genus in the family Trichosphaeriaceae. This is a monotypic genus, containing the single species Unisetosphaeria penguinoides, found on dead petioles and rhachides of the palms Eleiodoxa conferta and Nenga pumila in Sirindhorn Peat Swamp Forest, southern Thailand.
