= Brunneosporella =

Scientific classification
- Kingdom: Fungi
- Division: Ascomycota
- Class: Sordariomycetes
- Family: Annulatascaceae
- Genus: Brunneosporella; V.M. Ranghoo & K.D. Hyde (2001)

Type species
- Brunneosporella aquatica Ranghoo & K.D. Hyde (2001)

Genus of fungi

Brunneosporella is a fungal genus in the Annulatascaceae family of the Ascomycota. The relationship of this taxon to other taxa within the Sordariomycetes class is unknown (incertae sedis), and it has not yet been placed with certainty into any order. This is a monotypic genus, containing the single species Brunneosporella aquatica. The type specimen was found in rotting wood, found submerged in fresh water in Hong Kong.
