= Kananascus =

Scientific classification
- Kingdom: Fungi
- Division: Ascomycota
- Class: Sordariomycetes
- Order: Trichosphaeriales
- Family: Trichosphaeriaceae
- Genus: Kananascus; Nag Raj (1984)

Type species
- Kananascus verrucisporus Nag Raj

Species
- K. europaeus K. koorchalomagnatus K. verrucisporus

Genus of fungi

Kananascus is a genus of fungi in the family Trichosphaeriaceae. The genus was circumscribed by Trn Raj in 1984.
