= Schweinitziella =

Scientific classification
- Kingdom: Fungi
- Division: Ascomycota
- Class: Sordariomycetes
- Order: Trichosphaeriales
- Family: Trichosphaeriaceae
- Genus: Schweinitziella; Speg. (1888)

Type species
- Schweinitziella styracum Speg. (1888)

Genus of fungi

Schweinitziella is a genus of fungi in the family Trichosphaeriaceae.

The genus was circumscribed by Carlos Luis Spegazzini in Anales Soc. Ci. Argent. vol.26 on page 45 in 1888.

The genus name of Schweinitziella is in honour of Lewis David de Schweinitz (1780–1834), who was a German-American botanist and mycologist. He is considered by some the "Father of North American Mycology".

== Species ==
As accepted by Species Fungorum;

- Schweinitziella mirabilis (Petr. & Cif.) Petr. (1958)
- Schweinitziella palmigena F. Stevens (1927)
- Schweinitziella perpusilla (Speg.) Piroz. (1977)
- Schweinitziella styracum Speg. (1888)
