= Cyanoannulus =

Scientific classification
- Kingdom: Fungi
- Division: Ascomycota
- Class: Sordariomycetes
- Family: Annulatascaceae
- Genus: Cyanoannulus; Raja, J.Campb. & Shearer (2003)

Type species
- Cyanoannulus petersenii Raja, J.Campb. & Shearer (2003)

Genus of fungi

Cyanoannulus is a fungal genus in the family Annulatascaceae of the Ascomycota. This is in the monotypic order of Annulatascales of the class Sordariomycetes. It was formerly classed as Sordariomycetes class (incertae sedis) in 2007.

This is a monotypic genus, containing the single species Cyanoannulus petersenii, which was found growing on decorticated wood (having had the outer covering removed) in a stream in North Carolina.

It was described and published by Raja, J. Campb. & Shearer in Mycotaxon vol.88 on page 11 in 2003.
