= Collematospora =

Scientific classification
- Kingdom: Fungi
- Division: Ascomycota
- Class: Sordariomycetes
- Order: Trichosphaeriales
- Family: Trichosphaeriaceae
- Genus: Collematospora; Jeng & Cain (1976)

Type species
- Collematospora venezuelensis Jeng & Cain (1976)

Genus of fungi

Collematospora is a fungal genus in the family Trichosphaeriaceae. This is a monotypic genus, containing the single species Collematospora venezuelensis, first described by R.S. Jeng and R.F. Cain in 1976.
