= Kordigast =

Mountain in Bavaria, Germany

Coordinates: 50°06′N 11°13′E

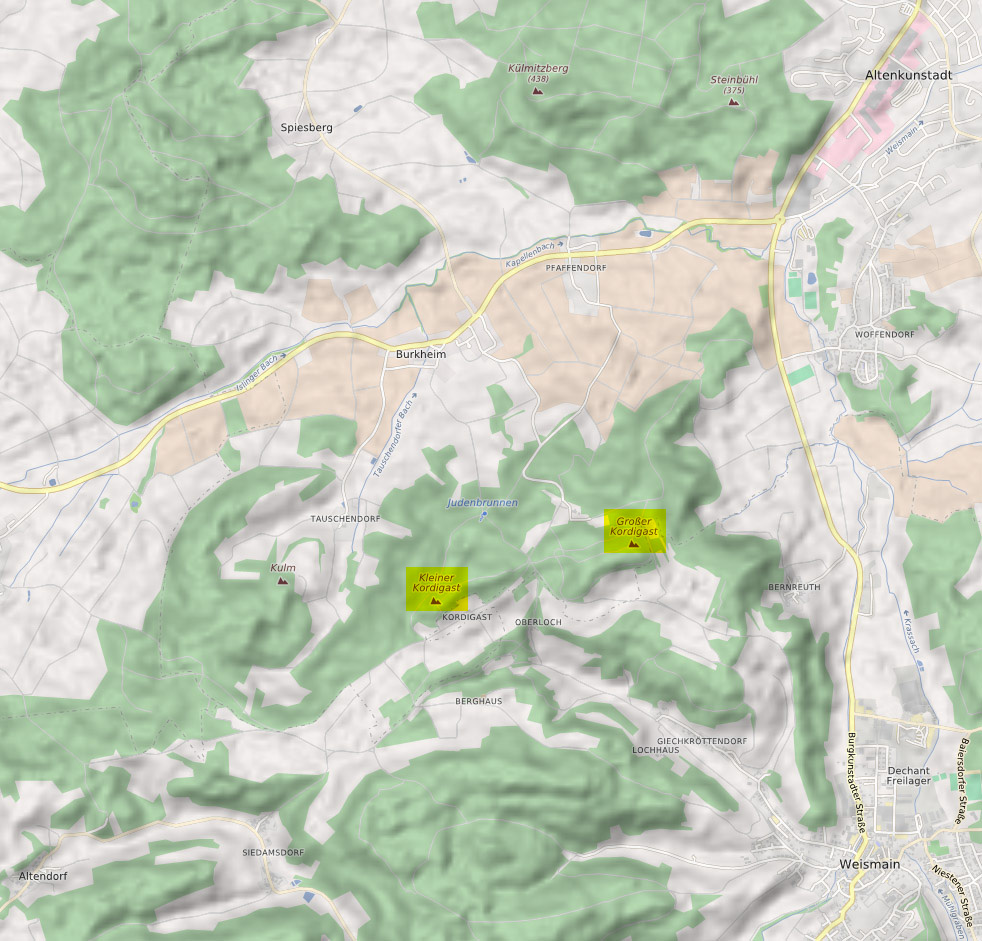

Highest point
- Elevation: 538.1 m (1,765 ft)

Geography
- Location: Bavaria, Germany

Kordigast is a mountain of Bavaria, Germany.
