= Trichosphaeria =

Scientific classification
- Kingdom: Fungi
- Division: Ascomycota
- Class: Sordariomycetes
- Order: Trichosphaeriales
- Family: Trichosphaeriaceae
- Genus: Trichosphaeria; Fuckel (1870)

Type species
- Trichosphaeria pilosa (Pers.) Fuckel (1870)

Genus of fungi

Trichosphaeria is a genus of fungi in the family Trichosphaeriaceae. There are about 25 species in this widespread genus, and they are typically found in woody habitats.
