= Pseudoproboscispora =

Scientific classification
- Kingdom: Fungi
- Division: Ascomycota
- Class: Sordariomycetes
- Order: Atractosporales
- Family: Pseudoproboscisporaceae
- Genus: Pseudoproboscispora; Punith. (1999)

Type species
- Pseudoproboscispora aquatica (S.W.Wong & K.D.Hyde) Punith. (1999)

Genus of fungi

Pseudoproboscispora is a genus of fungi in the Pseudoproboscisporaceae family of the Ascomycota. As accepted by Wijayawardene et al. 2020;

== Species ==
As accepted by Species Fungorum;

- Pseudoproboscispora aquatica (S.W. Wong & K.D. Hyde) Punith. (1999)
- Pseudoproboscispora caudae-suis (Ingold) J. Campb., Shearer, J.L. Crane & Fallah (2003)
- Pseudoproboscispora thailandensis W. Dong, Huang Zhang & K.D. Hyde (2017)
