= Coniobrevicolla =

Scientific classification
- Kingdom: Fungi
- Division: Ascomycota
- Class: Sordariomycetes
- Order: Trichosphaeriales
- Family: Trichosphaeriaceae
- Genus: Coniobrevicolla; Réblová (1999)

Type species
- Coniobrevicolla larsenii Réblová (1999)

Genus of fungi

Coniobrevicolla is a fungal genus in the family Trichosphaeriaceae. This is a monotypic genus, containing the single species Coniobrevicolla larsenii.
