= Papulosaceae =

Scientific classification
- Kingdom: Fungi
- Division: Ascomycota
- Class: Sordariomycetes
- Subclass: Sordariomycetidae
- Family: Papulosaceae; Winka & O.E. Erikss. (2000)

Type genus
- Papulosa Kohlm. & Volkm.-Kohlm. (1993)

Type species
- Papulosa amerospora Kohlm. & Volkm.-Kohlm. (1993)

Family of fungi

The Papulosaceae are a family of fungi in the class Sordariomycetes and in the subclass Diaporthomycetidae. The family has not been assigned to any order (incertae sedis). A monotypic taxon, the Papulosaceae contained the single genus Papulosa, which in turn contains the single species Papulosa amerospora. This species, found in the eastern USA, grows in Juncus stems.

In 2020, 3 other fungal genera joined the taxon of Papulosa.

== Genera ==
- Brunneosporella V.M. Ranghoo & K.D. Hyde (1)
- Fluminicola S.W. Wong, K.D. Hyde & E.B.G. Jones (5)
- Papulosa Kohlm & Volkm-Kohlm (1)
- Wongia Khemmuk, Geering & R.G. Shivas. (3)
