= Lewis David de Schweinitz =

German-American botanist and mycologist (1780–1834)

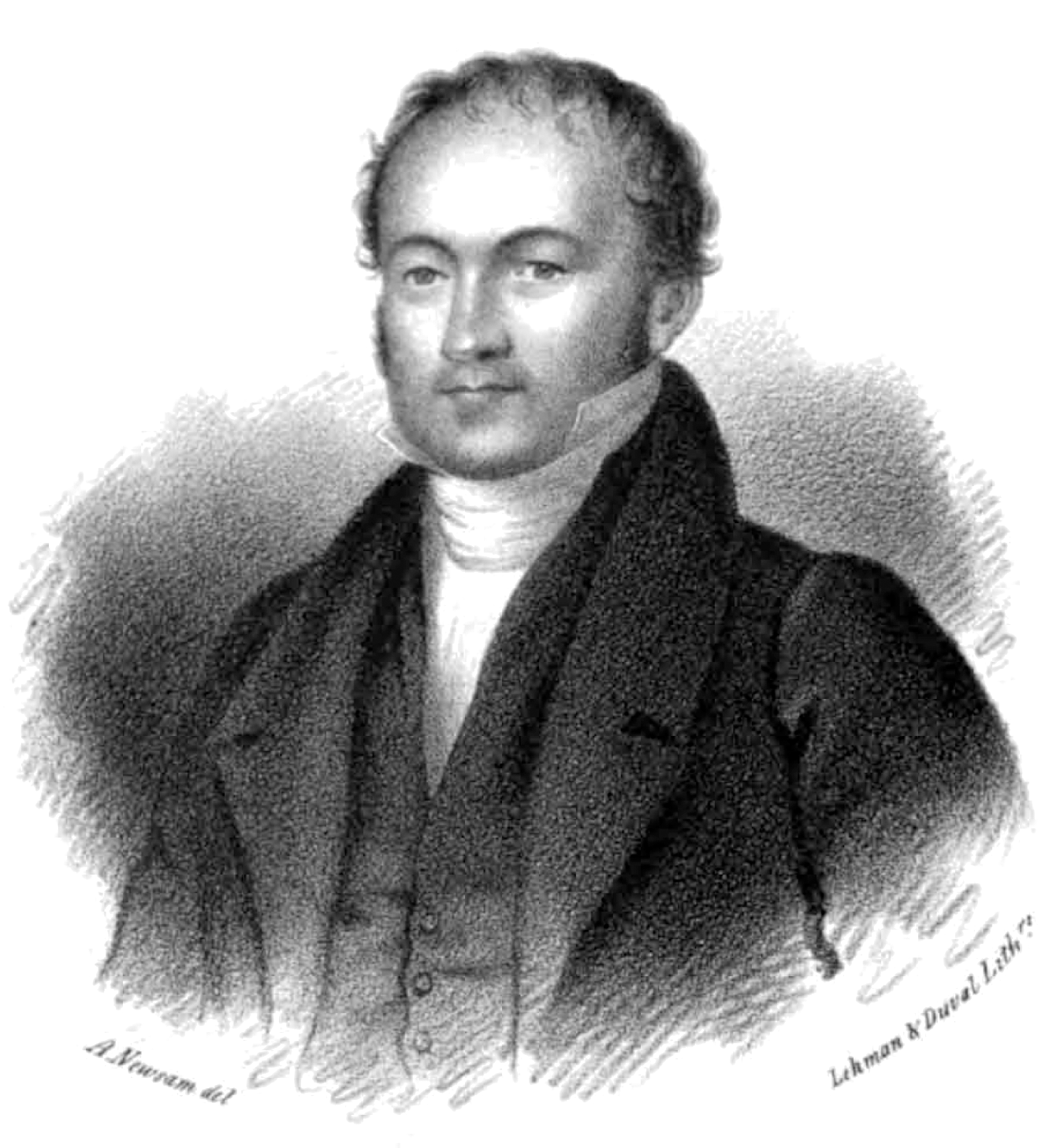
- Frontispiece from A Memoir of the Late Lewis David von Schweinitz, P.D. by Walter Rogers Johnson (1835)
- Born: 13 February 1780; Bethlehem, Pennsylvania, U.S.
- Died: 8 February 1834 (aged 53); Bethlehem, Pennsylvania
- Scientific career
- Fields: Botany, mycology
- Author abbrev. (botany): Schwein.

Lewis David de Schweinitz (13 February 1780 – 8 February 1834) was a German-American botanist and mycologist from Bethlehem, Pennsylvania. Considered the "Father of North American Mycology," he also made significant contributions to botany.

== Education ==
Born in Bethlehem, Pennsylvania, a great-grandson of Count Nikolaus Ludwig von Zinzendorf und Pottendorf, founder and patron of the Moravian Church, in 1787 Schweinitz was placed in the institution of the Moravian community at Nazareth, Pennsylvania, where he remained for eleven years and was a successful and industrious student. Schweinitz later entered the Theological seminary at Niesky (Saxony) in 1798. In 1805, he published the Conspectus Fungorum in Lusatiae in collaboration with his teacher, Professor Johannes Baptista von Albertini.

== Early career ==
In 1807 he went to Gnadenberg (in Silesia), then subsequently to Gnadau to work as a preacher in the Moravian Church. A work appointment in the United States led him on a route through Denmark and Sweden, to avoid Napoleon's operations. This path allowed him to meet with some of the academics at Kiel University in Holstein, where he received an honorary Ph.D. "in absentia, for his work as an administrator, his cultivation of natural science, and the Conspectus".

== Return to the United States ==
After returning to the United States in 1812, he settled in Salem, North Carolina (now called Old Salem), North Carolina, working as an administrator of church estates. (He lived in what had been built as the Dr. Samuel Benjamin Vierling House which is now an exhibit building open for public tours.) The results of his mycological research in this location would later be published as Synopsis Fungorum Carolinæ Superioris in 1822. This work was edited by Christian Friedrich Schwaegrichen who, by a printer's error, was misnamed on the title page. The identity of the editor has been a source of confusion ever since. Schweinitz was elected to membership in the American Philosophical Society in 1817. The Synopsis was published without Schweinitz's knowledge: in 1818, he had simply given a list of North Carolina fungi to a friend in Leipzig. When he unexpectedly received prints of the published work four years later, he was "surprised but pleased". The Synopsis listed 1,373 species of fungi, and named and described 320 novel species. These new discoveries included such now widely known species as Lactarius indigo, Cantharellus cinnabarinus, and Hypomyces lactifluorum.

== Honors and later career ==
Several taxa of plants were named in his honour; including in 1888, Schweinitziella, a genus of fungi in the family Trichosphaeriaceae. A new genus in the family Ericaceae was named Schweinitzia in 1817, (but now classed a synonym of Monotropsis) and also a species of polypore, Phaeolus schweinitzii was named in his honour.

He was a member of various learned societies in the United States, Germany, and France. While a resident of Salem he was elected president of the University of North Carolina, which honor he declined because it involved relinquishing work in the Moravian church. In 1821 he returned to his native village in Pennsylvania and continued his studies until his death. He described Dibotryon morbosum (Schwein.) Theiss. & Syd., 1915, as well as Cantharellus (now Gomphus) floccosus in 1832.

His herbarium, which comprised at the time of his death the largest private collection of plants in the United States, he bequeathed to the Academy of Natural Sciences at Philadelphia. The fungi among this collection were subsequently organised for preservation and display by Ezra Michener. His birthplace, the Gemeinhaus-Lewis David de Schweinitz Residence, is a National Historic Landmark in Bethlehem, Pennsylvania.

== Selected publications ==
- Albertini, J. B. de, Schweinitz, L.D. de. (1805). Conspectus Fungorum in Lusatiæ superioris agro Nieskiensi crescentium e methodo Persooniana. Cum tabulis XII, æneis pictis, species nova XCIII sistendibus. Leipsic.
- Schweinitz, L. D. de. (1822). Synopsis Fungorum Carolinae Superioris. edita a D.(sic) F. Schwaegrichen. Soc. nat. cur. Lips. 4:20-132.
- _________________ (1825). Description of a number of new American species of Sphaeriae. Jour. Acad. Nat. Sci. Phila. 5:3-17.
- _________________ (1832). Synopsis Fungorum in America Boreali Media Digentium. Trans. Am. Phil. Soc. of Phil. N. S. 4:141-318.

Schweinitz' three works on American fungi contain a total of 4,491 species; of these, 1,533 were described as new and 10 new genera were established.

== See also ==
- Category:Taxa named by Lewis David de Schweinitz
