= Brachysporium =

Scientific classification
- Kingdom: Fungi
- Division: Ascomycota
- Class: Sordariomycetes
- Order: Trichosphaeriales
- Family: Trichosphaeriaceae
- Genus: Brachysporium; Sacc. (1886)

Type species
- Brachysporium obovatum (Berk.) Sacc. (1886)

Synonyms
- Cryptadelphia Réblová & Seifert (2004)

Genus of fungi

Brachysporium is a genus of anamorphic fungi in the family Trichosphaeriaceae. It has 25 species. The genus was circumscribed in 1886 by Pier Andrea Saccardo, with Brachysporium obovatum assigned as the type species. The genus Cryptadelphia, circumscribed in 2004 to contain six presumed teleomorphs of Brachysporium, has since been placed in synonymy with Brachysporium.

== Species ==
- Brachysporium abietinum Hol.-Jech. (1972)
- Brachysporium bloxamii (Cooke) Sacc. (1886)
- Brachysporium breve Hol.-Jech. (1972)
- Brachysporium britannicum S.Hughes (1951)
- Brachysporium citrulli Nasȳrov (1972)
- Brachysporium cynodontis Nasȳrov (1972)
- Brachysporium dingleyae S.Hughes (1965)
- Brachysporium fusiforme Markovsk. & Treigienė (2007)
- Brachysporium graminis G.Boyer & Jacz. (1893)
- Brachysporium helgolandicum Schaumann (1973)
- Brachysporium masonii S.Hughes (1951)
- Brachysporium minutum Bat. & H.Maia (1965)
- Brachysporium nigrum (Link) S.Hughes (1958)
- Brachysporium noblesiae G.P.White & Illman (1990)
- Brachysporium novae-zelandiae S.Hughes (1965)
- Brachysporium obovatum (Berk.) Sacc. (1886)
- Brachysporium oosporum (Corda) Sacc. (1886)
- Brachysporium oryzae S.Ito & Ishiy. (1929)
- Brachysporium pendulisporum S.Hughes (1955)
- Brachysporium pini-insularis Henn. (1908)
- Brachysporium polyseptatum (Preuss) S.Hughes (1955)
- Brachysporium pulchrum M.B.Ellis (1966)
- Brachysporium syagri Bat. (1956)
- Brachysporium warneckeanum Henn. (1905)
