= Submersisphaeria =

Scientific classification
- Kingdom: Fungi
- Division: Ascomycota
- Class: Sordariomycetes
- Family: Annulatascaceae
- Genus: Submersisphaeria; K.D.Hyde (1996)

Type species
- Submersisphaeria aquatica K.D.Hyde (1996)

Species
- S. aquatica S. bambusicola S. palmae S. rattanicola S. vasicola

Genus of fungi

Submersisphaeria is a genus of fungi in the Annulatascaceae family of the Ascomycota. The relationship of this taxon to other taxa within the Sordariomycetes class is unknown (incertae sedis), and it has not yet been placed with certainty into any order.
