= Albert Julius Otto Penzig =

German mycologist (1856–1969)

Albert Julius Otto Penzig, also referred to as Albertus Giulio Ottone Penzig (15 March 1856, Samitz, Silesia – 6 March 1929, Genoa) was a German mycologist.

In 1877 he earned his degree from University of Breslau, afterwards serving as an assistant to Pier Andrea Saccardo at the botanical garden in Padua. Beginning in 1882 he was privat-docent at the University of Modena, becoming director of the Stazione Agraria Modena during the following year. In 1887 he was appointed professor of botany at the University of Genoa. He edited the exsiccata-like series Selectae stirpes Liguriae issued without serial numbers for the participants of the International Botanical Congress 1892.

Later he traveled to Ceylon and Java, where he conducted investigations of Myxomycetes in the laboratories at the Buitenzorg botanical gardens. While in Indonesia, he also took part in a scientific excursion to the Krakatau island group.

The mycological genus Penzigia was named in his honor in 1888 by Pier Andrea Saccardo. His name is also associated with the genera Penzigina (botanist Otto Kuntze, 1891), which is now a synonym for Eriosphaeria Sacc. and Penzigiella (author: painter/bryologist Max Fleischer, 1906).

== Publications ==
- "Pflanzen-Teratologie", Genua, Druck von A. Ciminago, 1890-94 (two volumes).
- "Icones fungorum javanicorum", 1904.
- "Flora delle Alpi illustrata", 1915.

== See also ==
- Category:Taxa named by Albert Julius Otto Penzig
