= Eriosphaeria =

Scientific classification
- Kingdom: Fungi
- Division: Ascomycota
- Class: Sordariomycetes
- Order: Trichosphaeriales
- Family: Trichosphaeriaceae
- Genus: Eriosphaeria; Sacc. (1875)

Type species
- Eriosphaeria vermicularia (Nees) Sacc. (1875)

Synonyms
- Cantharosphaeria Thaxt.; Eriosphaerella von Höhnel, 1906; Malacosphaeria H.Sydow, 1924; Penzigina O.Kuntze, 1891

Genus of fungi

Eriosphaeria is a genus of fungi in the family Trichosphaeriaceae. Species in this genus are plant pathogens.

== Species ==
As accepted by Species Fungorum;

- Eriosphaeria aggregata E. Müll. & Munk (1964)
- Eriosphaeria albidomucosa Rehm (1912)
- Eriosphaeria ambigua Höhn. (1909)
- Eriosphaeria analoga Sacc., E. Bommer & M. Rousseau (1890)
- Eriosphaeria atriseda (Feltgen) Sacc. & D. Sacc. (1905)
- Eriosphaeria australis Speg. (1887)
- Eriosphaeria blumenavica Henn. (1902)
- Eriosphaeria corylina Mouton (1887)
- Eriosphaeria dumetorum Nann. (1928)
- Eriosphaeria erysiphoides Rehm (1905)
- Eriosphaeria imitatrix (Berk. & Broome) Sacc. (1882)
- Eriosphaeria investans (Cooke) Sacc. (1882)
- Eriosphaeria membranacea (Berk. & Broome) Sacc. (1882)
- Eriosphaeria oenotria Sacc. & Speg. (1878)
- Eriosphaeria raripila Sacc. (1875)
- Eriosphaeria rehmiana (Höhn.) E. Müll. (1962)
- Eriosphaeria rehmii Cavara (1892)
- Eriosphaeria robiniae Beeli (1924)
- Eriosphaeria scabrosa (Syd.) E. Müll. (1962)
- Eriosphaeria scheremetieffiana Henn. (1904)
- Eriosphaeria subtomentosa Réblová (1997)
- Eriosphaeria vermicularia (Nees) Sacc. (1875)
- Eriosphaeria vulgaris Speg. (1887)

Note; some species have been moved from the genus into various families;

- Eriosphaeria alligata (Fr.) Sacc. (1882), = Herpotrichia alligata; Melanommataceae family
- Eriosphaeria andromedae (Rehm) Sacc. (1882), = Gibbera andromedae; Venturiaceae
- Eriosphaeria calospora Speg. (1884), = Melchioria calospora; Niessliaceae
- Eriosphaeria calospora var. infossa Starbäck (1899), = Melchioria calospora; Niessliaceae
- Eriosphaeria conoidea Feltgen (1903), = Lentomitella conoidea; Lentomitellaceae
- Eriosphaeria exigua Sacc. (1875), = Niesslia exigua; Niessliaceae
- Eriosphaeria herbarum Wehm. (1952), = Herpotrichia herbarum; Melanommataceae
- Eriosphaeria horridula (Wallr.) Sacc. (1882), = Niesslia horridula; Niessliaceae
- Eriosphaeria inaequalis Grove (1886), = Chaetosphaeria inaequalis; Chaetosphaeriaceae
- Eriosphaeria macrospora Wehm. (1952), = Wettsteinina macrospora; Dothideomycetes
- Eriosphaeria nigrita Sacc. (1882), = Crassochaeta nigrita; Chaetosphaerellaceae
- Eriosphaeria nitidula (Sacc.) Petr. 1921), = Trichosphaeria pilosa; Trichosphaeriaceae
- Eriosphaeria pomiformis (Pers.) Sacc. (1877), = Melanopsamma pomiformis; Niessliaceae
- Eriosphaeria pulchriseta (Peck) Sacc. (1883), = Niesslia pulchriseta; Niessliaceae
- Eriosphaeria sacchari (Breda de Haan) Went (1898), = Epicoccum sorghinum; Didymellaceae
- Eriosphaeria salisburgensis (Niessl) Neger (1901), = Gibbera salisburgensis; Venturiaceae
- Eriosphaeria vermicularioides Sacc. & Roum. (1883), = Chaetosphaeria vermicularioides; Chaetosphaeriaceae
