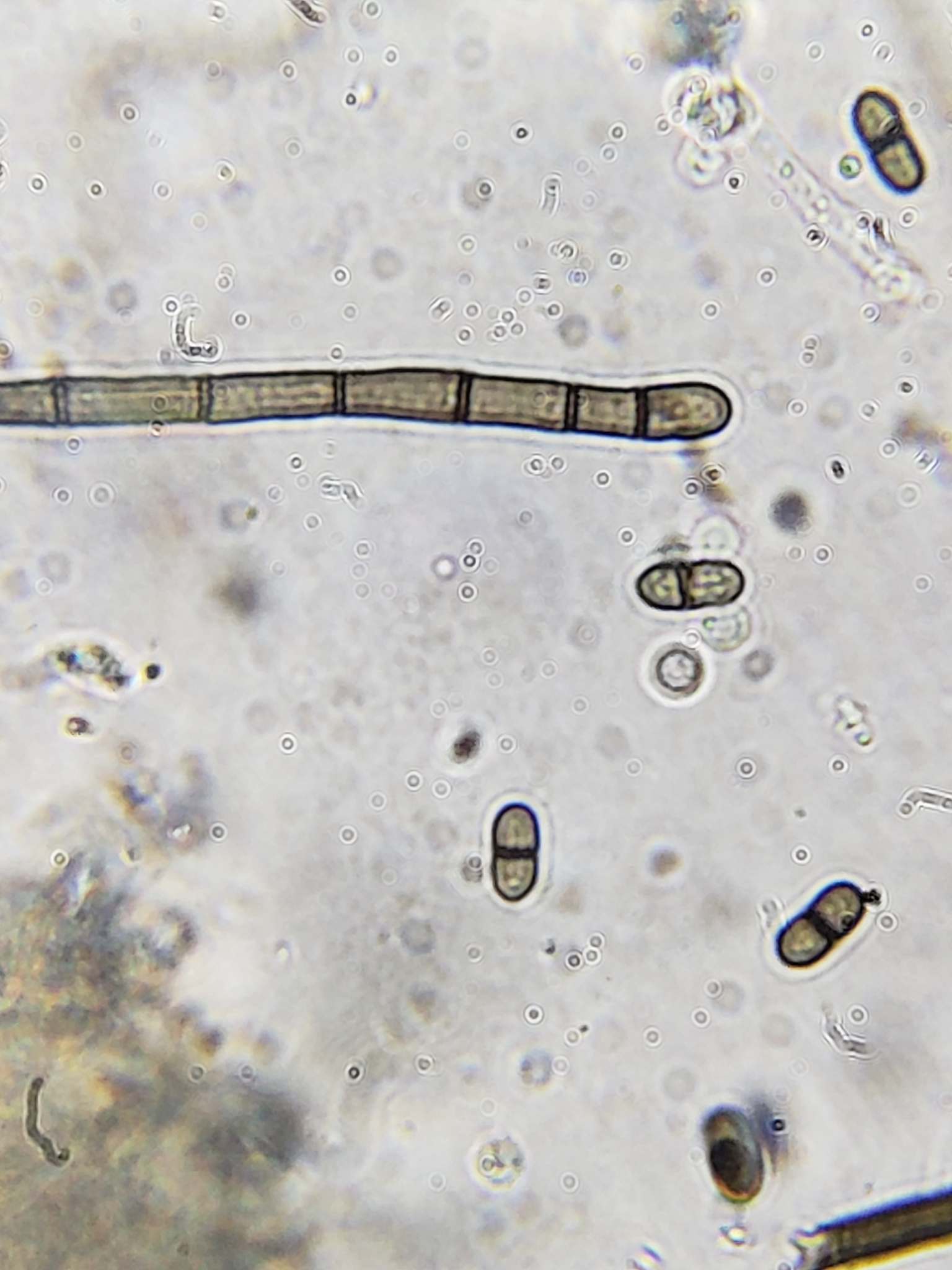
- Spadicoides bina

Scientific classification
- Domain: Eukaryota
- Kingdom: Fungi
- Division: Ascomycota
- Class: Sordariomycetes
- Order: Xenospadicoidales; M. Hernández-Restrepo, J. Mena & J. Gené, 2017
- Family: Xenospadicoidaceae; M. Hernández-Restrepo, J. Mena & J. Gené, 2017

Genera
- See text

= Xenospadicoidaceae =

Family of fungus

Xenospadicoidaceae is a family of fungus first described in 2017. Its parent taxon, Xenospadicoidales, is a monotypic order in the class Sordariomycetes.

== Species ==
The following genera are accepted within Xenospadicoidaceae:

- Calyptosphaeria (4 species)
- Lentomitella (13)
- Neospadicoides (3)
- Spadicoides (58)
- Torrentispora (9)
