= Ecological-Botanical Garden of the University of Bayreuth =

Botanical garden maintained by the University of Bayreuth

Coordinates: 49.9235°N 11.5854°E

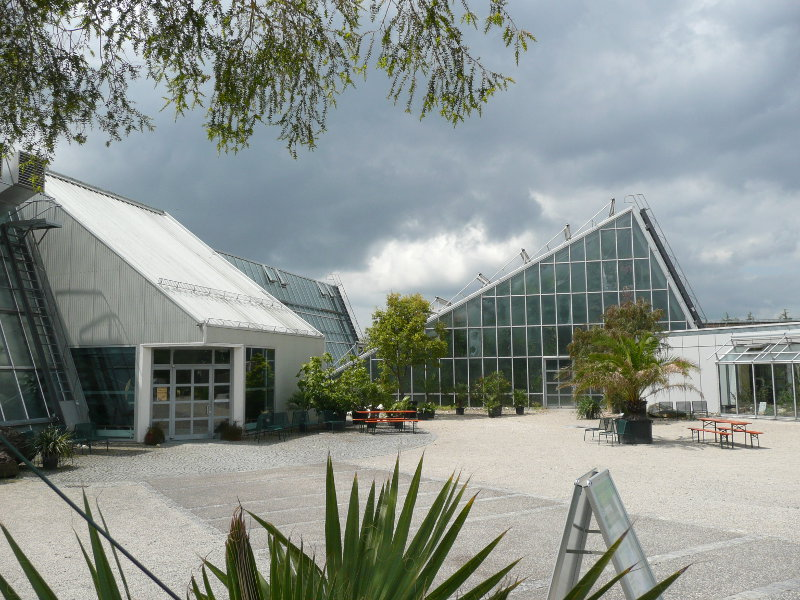
Main entrance and greenhouses of the ÖBG Bayreuth

The Ökologisch-Botanischer Garten der Universität Bayreuth (16 hectares) is a botanical garden maintained by the University of Bayreuth. It is located at Universitätsstraße 30, Bayreuth, Bavaria, Germany, and open daily except Saturday.

The garden was founded in 1978 with a focus on ecology and environmental field research and teaching. It now contains over 10,000 plant species from around the world, organized into four major sections:

- Crop garden (1 hectare)
- Ecology experimental plots (8 hectares) with lysimeter and groundwater basins.
- Greenhouses (about 8000 m^{2} total) containing woodland and grass plants, aquarium plants, succulents, and plants of tropical mountains and cloud forests.
- Geographic sections - plants from the Americas, Asia, and Europe.

The university also maintains a herbarium, established in 2001, which contains approximately 25,000 documents focusing on seed plants, but also with several thousand cryptogams, especially mosses, as well as a seed collection and library.

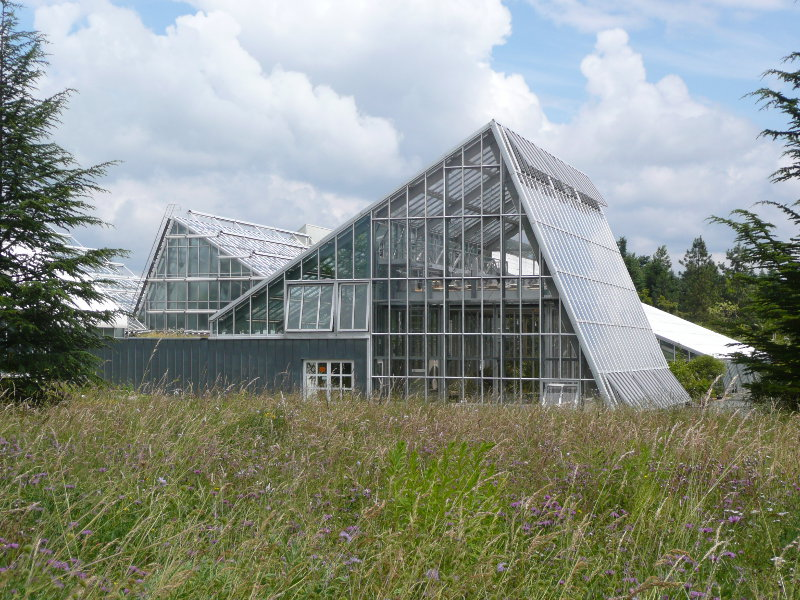
Greenhouse for plants from tropical mountain areas

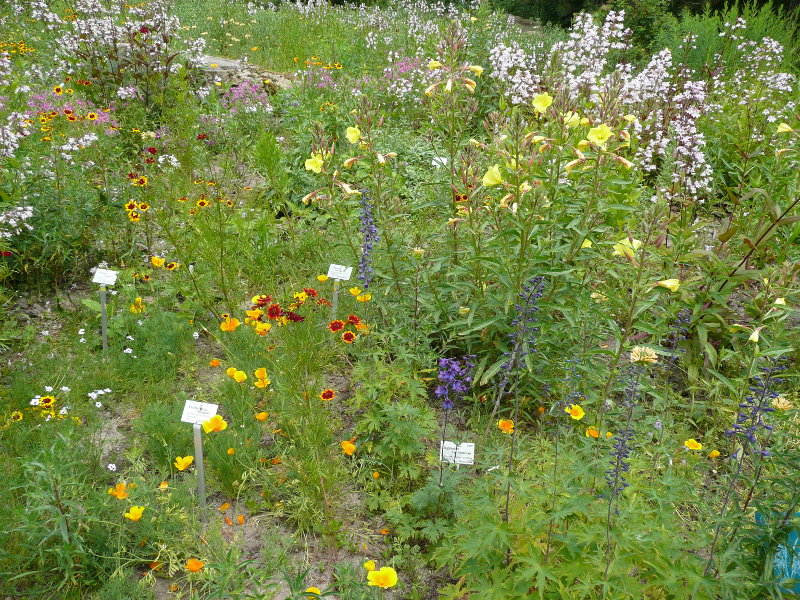
Flowers from the prairies of North America

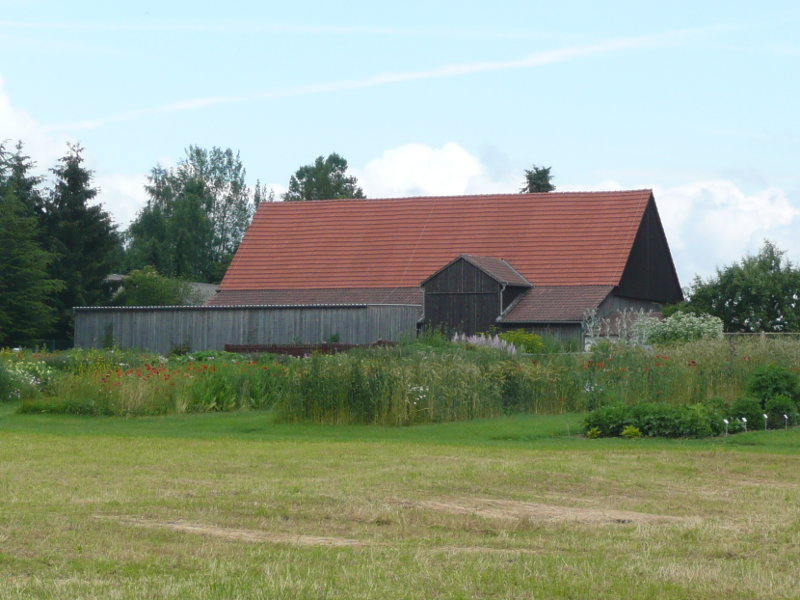
Crop garden and ancient farm

== See also ==
- List of botanical gardens in Germany
