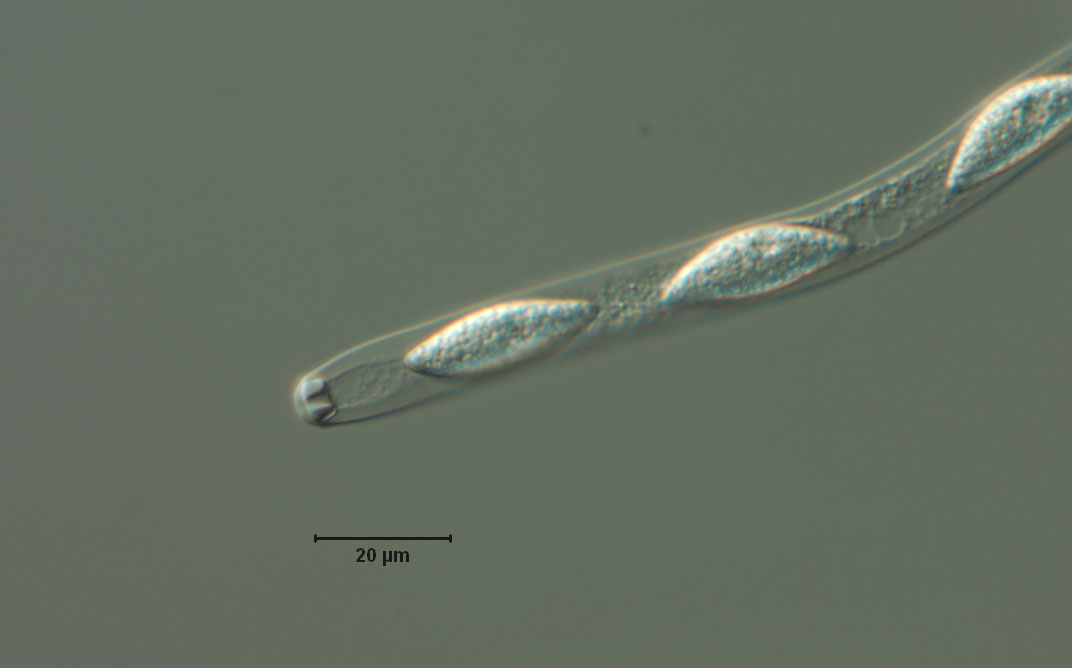
- Annulatscus velatisporus ascus and apical ring

Scientific classification
- Kingdom: Fungi
- Division: Ascomycota
- Class: Sordariomycetes
- Subclass: Diaporthomycetidae
- Family: Annulatascaceae; S.W.Wong, K.D.Hyde, & E.B.G.Jones (1998)

Type genus
- Annulatascus K.D.Hyde (1992)

= Annulatascaceae =

Family of fungi

The Annulatascaceae are a family of fungi in the monotypic order Annulatascales of the class Sordariomycetes of the Ascomycota. The family had not been assigned to any order, until 2020 when it was placed with a new order Annulatascales M.J. D'souza, Maharachch. & K.D. Hyde.

Species in this family are saprobic, often found growing on rotten wood in freshwater habitats. They have a widespread distribution, with many found in tropical areas.

== Genera ==
As accepted by Wijayawardene et al. 2020, 13 genera;

- Annulatascus K.D. Hyde (18 species)
- Annulusmagnus J. Campb. & Shearer (1)
- Aqualignicola Ranghoo, C.K.M. Tsui & K.D. Hyde (2)
- Ascitendus J. Campb. & Shearer (2)
- Ayria Fryar & K.D. Hyde (2)
- Cataractispora K.D. Hyde, S.W. Wong & E.B.G. Jones (5)
- Chaetorostrum Zelski, Raja, A.N. Mill. & Shearer (1)
- Fusoidigranularius W. Dong, H. Zhang & K.D. Hyde, 2020 (1)
- Longicollum Zelski (1)
- Longivarius W. Dong, H. Zhang & K.D. Hyde, 2020 (1)
- Pseudoproboscispora Z.L. Luo, Maharachch. & K.D. Hyde (1)
- Submersisphaeria K.D. Hyde (5)
- Vertexicola K.D. Hyde, Ranghoo & S.W. Wong (3)
