= Lulworthiomycetidae =

Scientific classification
- Kingdom: Fungi
- Division: Ascomycota
- Class: Sordariomycetes
- Subclass: Lulworthiomycetidae; Dayar., E.B.G. Jones & K.D. Hyde (2015)

Orders
- Koralionastetales; Lulworthiales

Subclass of fungi

Lulworthiomycetidae is a subclass of Sordariomycetes.

Sordariomycetes are one of the classes that can also be found in the sea, such as orders, Lulworthiales and Koralionastetales, which were placed in the subclass Lulworthiomycetidae, consist of exclusively marine taxa.

== Orders ==
As accepted by Wijayawardene et al. 2020;

- Koralionastetales Kohlm. & Volkm.-Kohlm. (1 family)
  - Koralionastetaceae (2 genera Koralionastes Kohlm. & Volkm.-Kohlm. and Pontogeneia Kohlm.)
- Lulworthiales Kohlm., Spatafora & Volkm.-Kohlm.
  - Lulworthiaceae Kohlm., Spatafora & Volkm.-Kohlm. (16 genera)
    - Cumulospora I. Schmidt (2)
    - Halazoon Abdel-Aziz, Abdel-Wahab & Nagah. (2)
    - Haloguignardia A. Cribb & J. Cribb (1)
    - Hydea K.L. Pang & E.B.G Jones (1)
    - Kohlmeyeriella E.B.G. Jones, R.G. Johnson & S.T. Moss (2)
    - Lindra I. Wilson (2)
    - Lulwoana Kohlm., Volkm.-Kohlm., J. Campb., Spatafora & Gräfenhan (6)
    - Lulwoidea Kohlm., Volkm.-Kohlm., J. Campb., Spatafora & Gräfenhan (1)
    - Lulworthia G.K. Sutherl (32)
    - Matsusporium E.B.G. Jones & K.L. Pang (1)
    - Moleospora Abdel-Wahab, Abdel-Aziz & Nagah (1)
    - Moromyces Abdel-Wahab, K.L. Pang, Nagah., Abdel-Aziz & E.B.G. Jones (1)
    - Orbimyces Linder (1)
    - Paralulworthia A. Poli, E. Bovio, L. Ranieri, G.C. Varese & V. Prigione (3)
    - Rostrupiella Jørg Koch, K.L. Pang & E.B.G. Jones. (1)
    - Sammeyersia S.Y. Guo, E.B.G. Jones & K.L. Pang (1)
