= Pisorisporiaceae =

Scientific classification
- Kingdom: Fungi
- Division: Ascomycota
- Class: Sordariomycetes
- Subclass: Pisorisporiomycetidae; Bundhun, Maharachch. & K.D. Hyde
- Order: Pisorisporiales; Réblová & J. Fourn.
- Family: Pisorisporiaceae; Réblová & J. Fourn.

Order of fungi

Pisorisporiales is an order of fungi within the division Ascomycota, subdivision Pezizomycotina, class Sordariomycetes and its own subclass Pisorisporiomycetidae.

It contains a single family Pisorisporiaceae and 2 genera; Achroceratosphaeria (2 species) and Pisorisporium (2 species).

== History ==
A freshwater and terrestrial based fungal genus Achroceratosphaeria was initially placed in Sordariomycetes incertae sedis (Réblová et al. 2010). Then phylogenetic analyses of fungal strains from an aquatic environment, including LSU, SSU and RPB2 sequence data, grouped them in a monophyletic clade with Achroceratosphaeria species (Réblová et al. 2015a). Four specimens of an unidentified fungus were collected on deciduous wood submerged in fresh water in France and Belgium during the years 2006–2014. The new taxa were placed in the novel genus, Pisorisporium and a new family, Pisorisporiaceae was then erected to accommodate genera Pisorisporium and Achroceratosphaeria. This new family Pisorisporiaceae was then placed in a new order of Pisorisporiales based on its distinct taxonomy and phylogeny at the ordinal level (Réblová et al. 2015a). The Pisorisporiales order forms a moderately-supported sister clade with Lulworthiales and Koralionastetales in Lulworthiomycetidae (Hongsanan et al. 2017). So, that meant the order of Pisorisporiales was once considered part of the subclass Lulworthiomycetidae Dayarathne et al. The order was then reported to have a stem age which falls between 250–300 MYA (million years ago), thereby placing it at a subclass level (Hyde et al. 2017a, Hongsanan et al. 2017,). Therefore Pisorisporiales was raised to the subclass Pisorisporiomycetidae in 2020. Currently, there is one family (Pisorisporiaceae) and two genera (Achroceratosphaeria and Pisorisporium) in this order.

== Subclass Pisorisporiomycetidae Bundhun, Maharachch. & K.D. Hyde ==
General description; Saprobic on submerged wood or driftwood. Sexual morph: Ascomata astromatic, perithecial, solitary or aggregated in small groups, immersed, semi-immersed to superficial and ostiolate. The ostiole is periphysate. The peridium (the outer wall of a sporangium) is 2-layered, leathery to fragile and partly carbonaceous. The paraphyses are abundant, hyaline (transparent or glass-like), persistent. The asci are 8-spored, unitunicate, pedicellate, persistent, with a J+ or J−, apical ring. Ascospores hyaline, multi-septate, often guttulate, lacking any mucilaginous sheath or appendages. The asexual morph was undetermined (as of March 2021).

== Description ==
Members of the Pisorisporiaceae family generally have: Ascomata (the asci-bearing fruiting body) is non-stromatic, immersed to superficial, papillate (has a small, elongated protuberance on the surface) or with a long neck. The venter is subglobose to conical, upright or lying obliquely or horizontally and the neck is central and rarely eccentric. The ostiole is periphysate (having short, thread-like filaments that line the opening). The ascomatal wall is leathery to fragile, partly carbonaceous in the outer layers and pigmented dark brown, opaque to light brown to subhyaline (almost glass-like). It is composed of two layers. The paraphyses (sterile upward-growing, basally-attached hypha in a hymenium) are abundant, persistent and cylindrical in shape. The asci are unitunicate (lidded), inside are 8 spores, with a pronounced amyloid or non-amyloid apical annulus, which is cylindrical-clavate (club-shaped) and persistently attached to the ascogenous hyphae at maturity. The Ascospores are fusiform (spindle-shaped), cylindrical or cymbiform (boat-shaped) and slightly taper towards the ends. They are hyaline, transversely multiseptate (having more than one septum), lacking a mucilaginous sheath or appendages, often with numerous guttules. The Asexual morph is unknown (as of 2015).

== Genera ==
It contains the family Pisorisporiaceae and 2 genera;

- Achroceratosphaeria
  - Achroceratosphaeria incolorata (Réblová) Réblová, J. Fourn. & K.D. Hyde (2010)
  - Achroceratosphaeria potamia Réblová, J. Fourn. & K.D. Hyde (2010)
- Pisorisporium
  - Pisorisporium cymbiforme Réblová & J. Fourn. (2015)
  - Pisorisporium glaucum Réblová & J. Fourn. (2015)

== Distribution ==
It has a cosmopolitan distribution across the globe. They have been found in South America, Europe (including France and Belgium,), Asia (including India, China, Japan, and Thailand,) Australia and New Zealand, as well as parts of North America, Europe and Africa.

Example include Achroceratosphaeria potamia Réblová, Fourn. and Hyde which has been found in the Mediterranean Sea in Italy, on a piece of submerged wood of Platanus sp. Also Pisorisporium cymbiforme and Achroceratosphaeria potamia has both been found on decayed woody twigs and branches submerged in freshwater streams in forests in Yunnan Province, China, as well as Satun and Songkhla provinces in Thailand.
