= Lulworthia =

Scientific classification
- Kingdom: Fungi
- Division: Ascomycota
- Class: Sordariomycetes
- Order: Lulworthiales
- Family: Lulworthiaceae
- Genus: Lulworthia; G.K. Sutherl.

Type species
- Lulworthia fucicola G.K. Sutherl.

Genus of fungi

Lulworthia is a genus of fungi within the Lulworthiaceae family.

== History and taxonomy ==
The genus Lulworthia was originally described in 1916 by George Kenneth Sutherland to contain the species Lulworthia fucicola, a fungus found on the seaweed commonly known as the bladder wrack at Lulworth on the coast of Dorset, UK. The fungus has since been collected several times from submerged wood, but never again from the original algal host; it was subsequently reported that specimens found on wood were morphologically different from those originally described growing on algae. Since the original specimens had deteriorated beyond use, a holotype was designated, using submerged-wood specimens found in Chile in 1984.

== Species ==
As accepted by Species Fungorum;

- Lulworthia atlantica E. Azevedo, Caeiro & Barata (2017)
- Lulworthia attenuata T.W. Johnson (1958)
- Lulworthia bulgariae Parg.-Leduc (1967)
- Lulworthia calcicola Kohlm. & Volkm.-Kohlm. (1989)
- Lulworthia conica T.W. Johnson (1958)
- Lulworthia curalii (Kohlm.) Kohlm. & Volkm.-Kohlm. (1991)
- Lulworthia cylindrica (Linder) Cribb & J.W. Cribb (1955)
- Lulworthia floridana Meyers (1957)
- Lulworthia fucicola G.K. Sutherl. (1916)
- Lulworthia halima (Diehl & Mounce) Cribb & J.W. Cribb (1955)
- Lulworthia kniepii (Ade & Bauch) Petr. (1957)
- Lulworthia lindroidea Kohlm. (1980)
- Lulworthia longirostris (Linder) Cribb & J.W. Cribb (1955)
- Lulworthia longispora Cribb & J.W. Cribb (1955)
- Lulworthia maritima (Sacc.) Cribb & J.W. Cribb (1955)
- Lulworthia medusa (Ellis & Everh.) Cribb & J.W. Cribb (1955)
- Lulworthia opaca (Linder) Cribb & J.W. Cribb (1955)
- Lulworthia purpurea (I.M. Wilson) T.W. Johnson (1958)
- Lulworthia rotunda T.W. Johnson (1958)
- Lulworthia rufa (I.M. Wilson) T.W. Johnson (1958)
- Lulworthia salina (Linder) Cribb & J.W. Cribb (1955)
- Lulworthia submersa T.W. Johnson (1958)

Former species (all are still family Lulworthiaceae);

- L. crassa Nakagiri (1984) = Kohlmeyeriella crassa
- L. grandispora Meyers (1957) = Sammeyersia grandispora
- L. grandispora var. apiculata T.W. Johnson (1958) = Lulworthia medusa
- L. kniepii var. curalii Kohlm. (1984) = Lulworthia curalii
- L. lignoarenaria Jørg. Koch & E.B.G. Jones (1984) = Lulwoidea lignoarenaria
- L. medusa var. apiculata (T.W. Johnson) T. Booth (1983) = Lulworthia medusa
- L. medusa var. biscaynia Meyers (1957) = Lulworthia medusa
- L. medusa var. fucicola (G.K. Sutherl.) T. Booth (1983) = Lulworthia fucicola
- L. medusa var. halima (Diehl & Mounce) T. Booth (1983) = Lulworthia halima
- L. purpureus (I.M. Wilson) T.W. Johnson (1958) = Lulworthia purpurea
- L. rufus (I.M. Wilson) T.W. Johnson (1958) = Lulworthia rufa
- L. uniseptata Nakagiri (1984) = Lulwoana uniseptata
