= Apharia (disambiguation) =

Apharia or Aphariya may refer to:

- Aphariya or Aphariyas, a clan of Ahir caste in India
- Apharia, a genus of fungi within the class Sordariomycetes
- Afareyanaj, a village in Ab Barik Rural District, in the Central District of Sonqor County, Kermanshah Province, Iran
- Aphareus, a character in Greek mythology
- Apaharan, a Hindi movie
- Aphareus (writer), a Greek writer
