= Haloguignardia =

Scientific classification
- Kingdom: Fungi
- Division: Ascomycota
- Class: Sordariomycetes
- Order: Lulworthiales
- Family: Lulworthiaceae
- Genus: Haloguignardia; Cribb & J.W.Cribb

Type species
- Haloguignardia decidua Cribb & J.W.Cribb

Species
- H. cystoseirae H. decidua H. irritans H. longispora H. oceanica H. tumefaciens

Genus of fungi

Haloguignardia is a genus of fungi in the family Lulworthiaceae. The genus was first described in 1956 by Alan and Joan Cribb.
