= Schomburgk Bay =

Bay on the north-east coast of Borneo

- Malay: Teluk Schomburgk
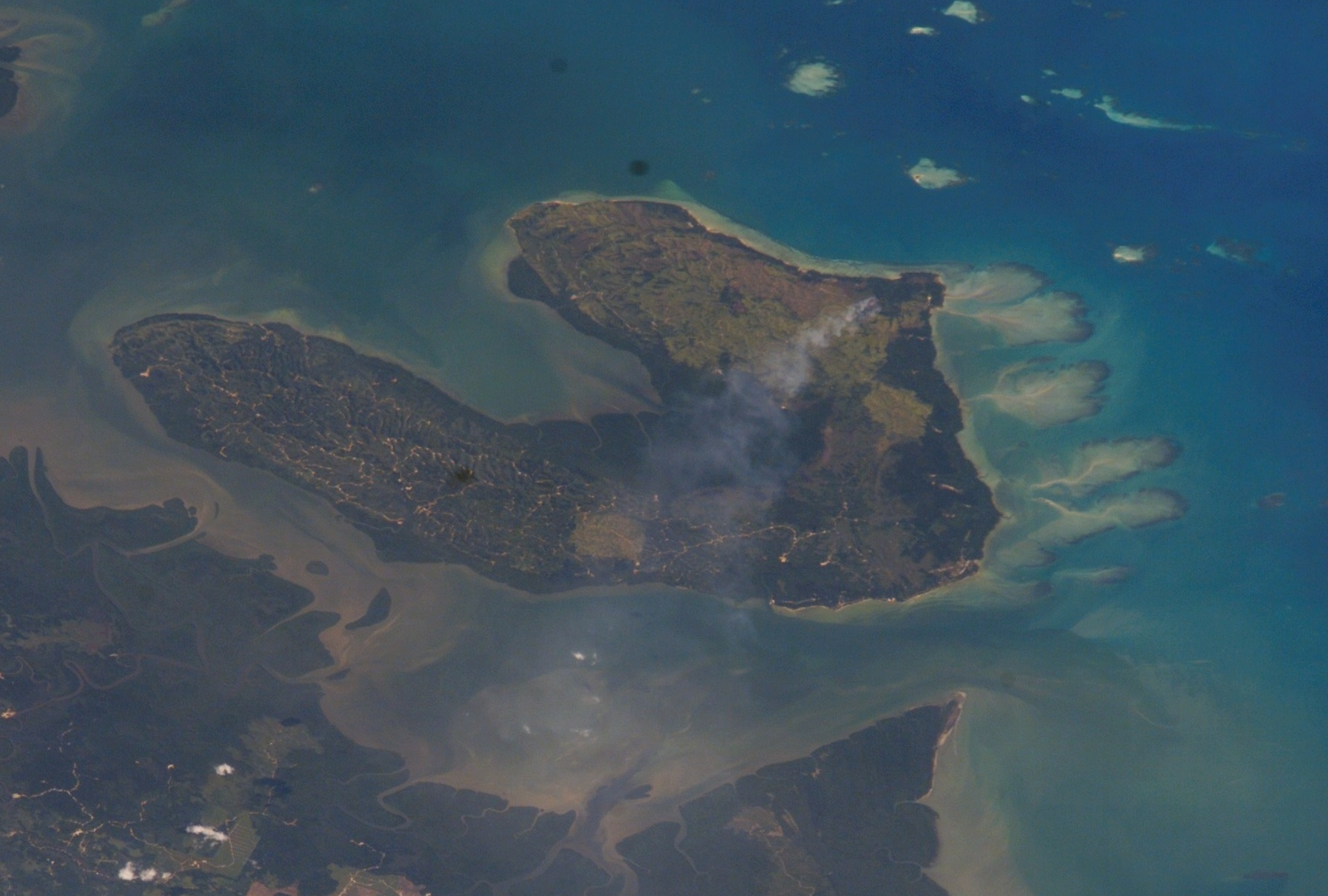
- Schomburgk Bay is located just south of Jambongan Island.

- Location within Sabah Location within Malaysia
- Location: Beluran District, Sandakan Division, Sabah, Malaysia
- Coordinates: 6°35′00″N 117°26′00″E
- Type: Bay
- Primary inflows: South China Sea
- Basin countries: Malaysia

Schomburgk Bay (Malay: Teluk Schomburgk) is a bay on the northern coast of the island of Borneo. It is located in the Malaysian state of Sabah and borders the Sulu Sea. Administratively, it is a part of Beluran District in Sandakan Division.

== Geography ==
The bay covers an area of approximately 100 km^{2}. The coastline on the mainland is densely forested with mangrove swamps. Jambongan Island is located on the north side of the bay. A narrow waterway, which is not suitable for regular shipping due to the shallow water, connects Schomburgk Bay with Paitan Bay.

== History ==
The bay was apparently named after Carl Schomburgk, a business partner of William Clarke Cowie. Cowie had a business relationship with the Sultan of Sulu from 1872 (he smuggled weapons through the Spanish naval blockade for him) and founded the Labuan Trading Company with Schomburgk and Ross in the same year. The name Schomburgk Bay is first found on an 1899 map of British North Borneo published by the North Borneo Chartered Company.
