= A. ferruginea =

A. ferruginea may refer to:

- Abarema ferruginea, a legume species
- Acacia ferruginea, a legume species found only in Sri Lanka
- Aegiphila ferruginea, a plant species endemic to Ecuador
- Albizia ferruginea, a plant species found in Angola, Benin and Cameroon
- Aniba ferruginea, a plant species endemic to Venezuela
- Anisophyllea ferruginea, a plant species found in Brunei, Indonesia and Malaysia
- Azbukinia ferruginea, a fungus species

== See also ==
- Ferruginea (disambiguation)
