= Kohlmeyeriella =

Scientific classification
- Kingdom: Fungi
- Division: Ascomycota
- Class: Sordariomycetes
- Order: Lulworthiales
- Family: Lulworthiaceae
- Genus: Kohlmeyeriella; E.B.G.Jones, R.G.Johnson & S.T.Moss

Type species
- Kohlmeyeriella tubulata (Kohlm.) E.B.G.Jones, R.G.Johnson & S.T.Moss

Species
- K. crassa K. tubulata

Genus of fungi

Kohlmeyeriella is a genus of fungi within the Lulworthiaceae family.

The genus name of Kohlmeyeriella is in honour of Jan Justus Kohlmeyer (b.1928), a (German born) American botanist (Mycology) from the University of North Carolina.

The genus was circumscribed by Evan Benjamin Gareth Jones, R.G. Johnson and Stephen Thomas Moss in 1983.
