= Porodiscus =

Porodiscus may refer to:

- Porodiscus (fungus), a fungal genus within the class Sordariomycetes
- Porodiscus (diatom), a genus of fossil diatoms in the family Coscinodiscaceae
- Porodiscus (protist), a radiolarian protist genus in the family Spongodiscidae
