= A. japonica =

A. japonica may refer to:

- Acidia japonica, a fruit fly species
- Actinochaetopteryx japonica, a tachinid fly species
- Acromantis japonica, the Japanese boxer mantis, a praying mantis species found in Japan, Korea, Taiwan and China
- Alauda japonica, the Japanese skylark, a bird species endemic to Japan
- Alternaria japonica, a plant pathogen species
- Ameromassaria japonica, a fungus species
- Amycolatopsis japonica, a high-GC content bacterium species in the genus Amycolatopsis
- Anguilla japonica, the Japanese eel, a fish species found in Japan, Korea, Vietnam, the East China Sea and the northern Philippines
- Architeuthis japonica, a giant squid species
- Ardisia japonica, a plant species native to eastern Asia, in eastern China, Japan and Korea
- Arhopala japonica, the Japanese oakblue, a butterfly species found in Japan, Riu Kiu, the Korean Peninsula and Taiwan
- Artemisia japonica, the otoko yomogi, a plant species in the genus Artemisia
- Aucuba japonica, the spotted laurel, a shrub species native to Japan and China

== Synonyms ==
- Aralia japonica, a synonym for Fatsia japonica, the fatsi or Japanese aralia, a plant species native to southern Japan

== See also ==
- Japonica (disambiguation)
