= Pumilus =

Pumilus may refer to:

- Pumilus (brachiopod), a genus of brachiopods in the family Kraussinidae
- Pumilus (fungus), a genus of funguses in the class Sordariomycetes, order and family unassigned
