= Aropsiclus =

Scientific classification
- Kingdom: Fungi
- Division: Ascomycota
- Class: Sordariomycetes
- Order: incertae sedis
- Genus: Aropsiclus; Kohlm. & Volkm.-Kohlm.

Type species
- Aropsiclus junci (Kohlm. & Volkm.-Kohlm.) Kohlm. & Volkm.-Kohlm.

Genus of fungi

Aropsiclus is a genus of fungi within the class Sordariomycetes. The relationship of this taxon to other taxa within the class is unknown (incertae sedis). This is a monotypic genus, containing the single species Aropsiclus junci.
