= Cryptoascus =

Scientific classification
- Kingdom: Fungi
- Division: Ascomycota
- Class: Sordariomycetes
- Informal group: Sordariomycetes incertae sedis
- Genus: Cryptoascus; Petri (1909)

Type species
- Cryptoascus oligosporus Petri (1909)

Species
- C. graminis C. oligosporus

Genus of fungi

Cryptoascus is a genus of fungi within the class Sordariomycetes. The relationship of this taxon to other taxa within the class is unknown (incertae sedis).
