= Acrospermoides =

Scientific classification
- Kingdom: Fungi
- Division: Ascomycota
- Class: Sordariomycetes
- Informal group: Sordariomycetes incertae sedis
- Genus: Acrospermoides; J.H. Mill. & G.E.Thomps. (1940)

Type species
- Acrospermoides subulata J.H.Mill. & G.E.Thomps. (1940)

Species
- A. protracta A. subulata

Genus of fungi

Acrospermoides is a genus of fungi within the class Sordariomycetes. The relationship of this taxon to other taxa within the class is unknown (incertae sedis).
