= Biporispora =

Scientific classification
- Kingdom: Fungi
- Division: Ascomycota
- Class: Sordariomycetes
- Informal group: Sordariomycetes incertae sedis
- Genus: Biporispora; J.D.Rogers, Y.M.Ju & Cand. (1999)

Type species
- Biporispora europaea J.D.Rogers, Y.M.Ju & Cand. (1999)

Genus of fungi

Biporispora is a fungal genus in the class Sordariomycetes. The relationship of this taxon to other taxa within the class is unknown (incertae sedis). This is a monotypic genus, containing the single species Biporispora europaea, described as new to science in 1999.
