= Brenesiella =

Scientific classification
- Kingdom: Fungi
- Division: Ascomycota
- Class: Sordariomycetes
- Informal group: Sordariomycetes incertae sedis
- Genus: Brenesiella; Syd. (1929)

Type species
- Brenesiella erythroxyli Syd. (1929)

Genus of fungi

Brenesiella is a fungal genus in the class Sordariomycetes. The relationship of this taxon to other taxa within the class is unknown (incertae sedis). Brenesiella is a monotypic genus, containing the single species Brenesiella erythroxyli, described as new to science by Paul Sydow in 1929.
