= Apogaeumannomyces =

Scientific classification
- Kingdom: Fungi
- Division: Ascomycota
- Class: Sordariomycetes
- Informal group: Sordariomycetes incertae sedis
- Genus: Apogaeumannomyces; Matsush.

Type species
- Apogaeumannomyces perplexus Matsush.

Genus of fungi

Apogaeumannomyces is a genus of fungi within the class Sordariomycetes. The relationship of this taxon to other taxa within the class is unknown (incertae sedis). This is a monotypic genus, containing the single species Apogaeumannomyces perplexus.
