= Ciliofusospora =

Scientific classification
- Kingdom: Fungi
- Division: Ascomycota
- Class: Sordariomycetes
- Informal group: Sordariomycetes incertae sedis
- Genus: Ciliofusospora; Bat. & J.L.Bezerra (1963)

Type species
- Ciliofusospora oenocarpi Bat. & J.L.Bezerra (1963)

Genus of fungi

Ciliofusospora is a genus of fungi within the class Sordariomycetes. The relationship of this taxon to other taxa within the class is unknown (incertae sedis). Ciliofusospora is monotypic, containing the single species Ciliofusospora oenocarpi. described as new to science in 1963.
