= Lulwoana =

Scientific classification
- Kingdom: Fungi
- Division: Ascomycota
- Class: Sordariomycetes
- Order: Lulworthiales
- Family: Lulworthiaceae
- Genus: Lulwoana; Kohlm., Volkm.-Kohlm., J.Campb., Spatafora & Gräfenhan (2005)

Type species
- Lulwoana uniseptata (Nakagiri) Kohlm., Volkm.-Kohlm., J.Campb., Spatafora & Gräfenhan (2005)

Synonyms
- Lulworthia uniseptata Nakagiri, Trans. Mycol. Soc. Japan 25(4): 382 (1984)

Genus of fungi

Lulwoana is a genus of fungi within the Lulworthiaceae family. This is a monotypic genus, containing the single species Lulwoana uniseptata.

It was originally published in 1984 as Lulworthia uniseptata and then re-published in Mycol. Res. vol.109 (5) on page 562 in 2005, with its new name of Lulwoana uniseptata.
