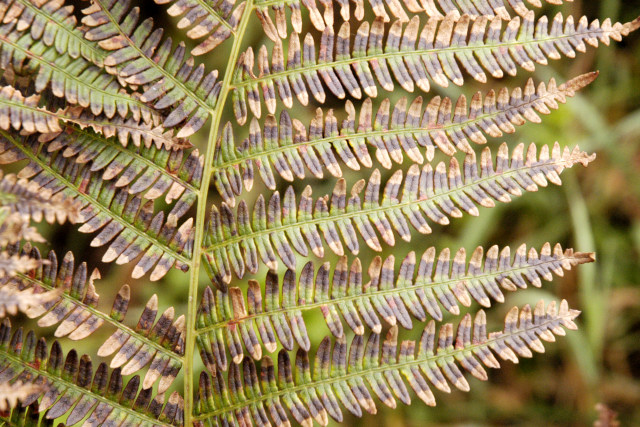
- Cryptomycina pteridis on a fern leaf

Scientific classification
- Kingdom: Fungi
- Division: Ascomycota
- Class: Sordariomycetes
- Informal group: Sordariomycetes incertae sedis
- Genus: Cryptomycina; Höhn. (1917)

Type species
- Cryptomycina pteridis (Rebent.) Höhn. (1917)

= Cryptomycina =

Genus of fungi

Cryptomycina is a genus of fungi in the class Sordariomycetes. The relationship of this taxon to other taxa within the class is unknown (incertae sedis).
