= Aquadulciospora =

Scientific classification
- Kingdom: Fungi
- Division: Ascomycota
- Class: Sordariomycetes
- Informal group: Sordariomycetes incertae sedis
- Genus: Aquadulciospora; Fallah & Shearer

Type species
- Aquadulciospora rhomboidia Fallah & Shearer

Genus of fungi

Aquadulciospora is a genus of fungi within the class Sordariomycetes. The relationship of this taxon to other taxa within the class is unknown (incertae sedis). This is a monotypic genus, containing the single species Aquadulciospora rhomboidia.
