= Neocryptospora =

Scientific classification
- Kingdom: Fungi
- Division: Ascomycota
- Class: Sordariomycetes
- Informal group: Sordariomycetes incertae sedis
- Genus: Neocryptospora; Petr. (1959)

Type species
- Neocryptospora rickii Petr. (1959)

Genus of fungi

Neocryptospora is a genus of fungi within the class Sordariomycetes. The relationship of this taxon to other taxa within the class is unknown (incertae sedis). According to the 2007 Outline of Ascomycota, the placement in this class is uncertain. The genus is monotypic, containing the single species Neocryptospora rickii, described by Austrian-Czech mycologist Franz Petrak in 1959.
