= Lyonella =

Scientific classification
- Kingdom: Fungi
- Division: Ascomycota
- Class: Sordariomycetes
- Informal group: Sordariomycetes incertae sedis
- Genus: Lyonella; Syd. (1925)

Type species
- Lyonella neurophila Syd. (1925)

Genus of fungi

Lyonella is a fungal genus in the class Sordariomycetes. The relationship of this taxon to other taxa within the class is unknown (incertae sedis). A monotypic genus, Lyonella contains the single species Lyonella neurophila, described as new to science by German mycologist Hans Sydow in 1925.

The genus name of Lyonella is in honour of Harold Lloyd Lyon (1879-1957), who was an American botanist (Algology and Mykology), Phytopathologist, working at the University of Minnesota.

The genus was circumscribed by Hans Sydow in Bernice P. Bishop. Mus. Bull. vol.19 on page 108 in 1925.
