= Bactrosphaeria =

Scientific classification
- Kingdom: Fungi
- Division: Ascomycota
- Class: Sordariomycetes
- Informal group: Sordariomycetes incertae sedis
- Genus: Bactrosphaeria; Penz. & Sacc. (1897)

Type species
- Bactrosphaeria asterostoma Penz. & Sacc. (1897)

Genus of fungi

Bactrosphaeria is a genus of fungi within the class Sordariomycetes. The relationship of this taxon to other taxa within the class is unknown (incertae sedis). A monotypic genus, Bactrosphaeria contains the single species Bactrosphaeria asterostoma.
