= Caproniella =

Scientific classification
- Kingdom: Fungi
- Division: Ascomycota
- Class: Sordariomycetes
- Informal group: Sordariomycetes incertae sedis
- Genus: Caproniella; Berl.

Genus of fungi

Caproniella is a genus of fungi within the class Sordariomycetes. The relationship of this taxon to other taxa within the class is unknown (incertae sedis).

The genus name of Caproniella is in honour of Edward Capron (x - 1907), a British botanist (Mycology) and Entomologist.

The genus was circumscribed by Augusto Napoleone Berlese in Icon. Fung. Vol.2 on page 62 in 1895.
