= Servaziella =

Scientific classification
- Kingdom: Fungi
- Division: Ascomycota
- Class: Sordariomycetes
- Family: incertae sedis
- Genus: Servaziella; J. Reid & C. Booth

Genus of fungi

Servaziella is a genus of fungi within the class Sordariomycetes. The relationship of this taxon to other taxa within the class is unknown (incertae sedis).

It has one known species Servazziella longispora (Servazzi) J. Reid & C. Booth, Can. J. Bot. 65(7): 1334 (1987).

The genus name of Servaziella is in honour of Ottone Servazzi (1902–1986), who was an Italian botanist, Lichenologist and mycologist and Plantpathologist from the University of Turin.
