= Konenia =

Scientific classification
- Kingdom: Fungi
- Division: Ascomycota
- Class: Sordariomycetes
- Informal group: Sordariomycetes incertae sedis
- Genus: Konenia; Hara (1913)

Type species
- Konenia bambusae Hara (1913)

Species
- K. bambusae K. sasicola

Genus of fungi

Konenia is a genus of fungi in the class Sordariomycetes. The relationship of this taxon to other taxa within the class is unknown (incertae sedis). The genus was circumscribed by Japanese mycologist Kanesuke Hara in 1913.
