= Jambongan Island =

Island of Sabah, Malaysia

Native name: Pulau Jambongan/Jembongan/Jambangan
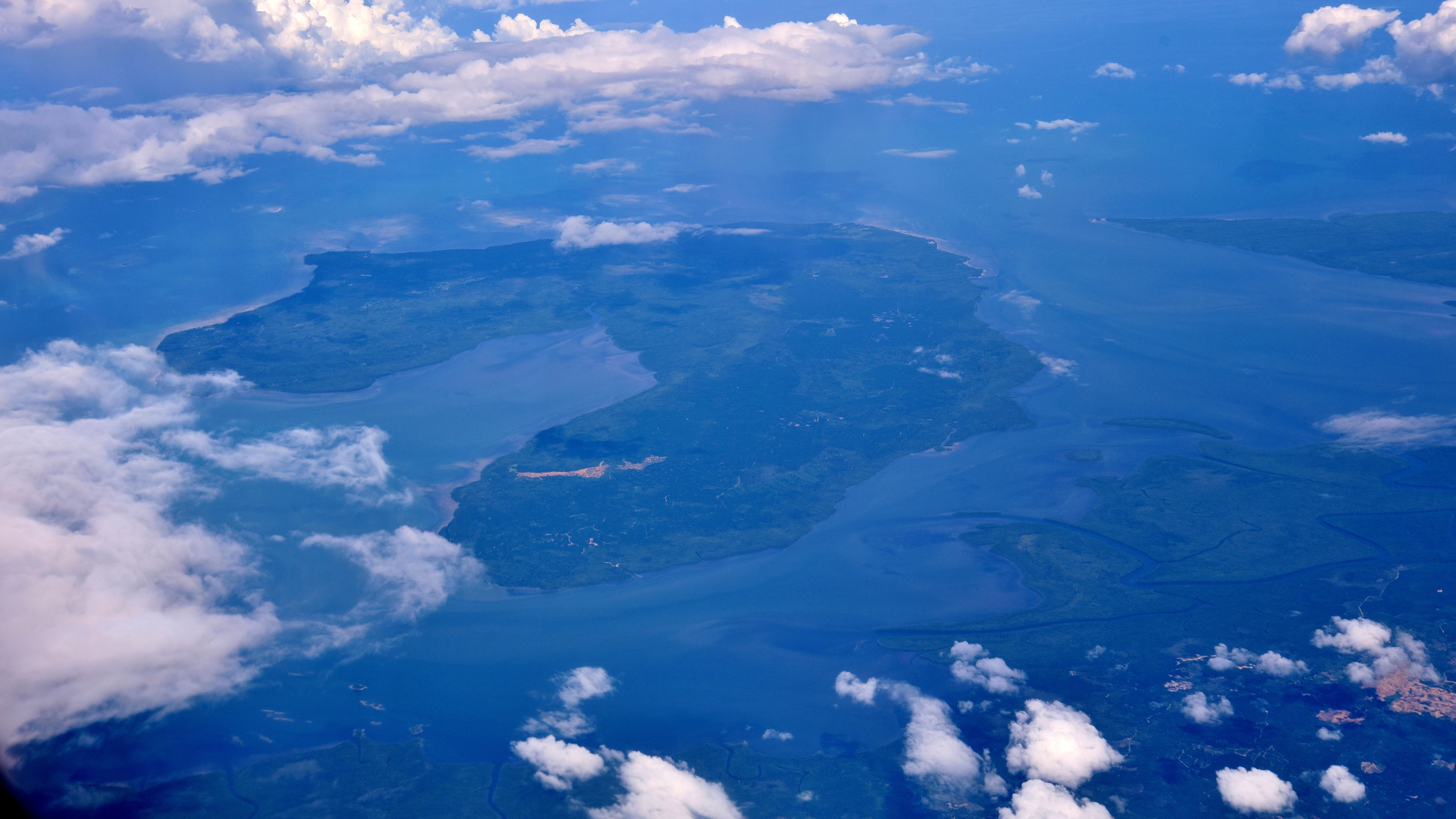
- The island seen from an aeroplane heading towards the Ninoy Aquino International Airport

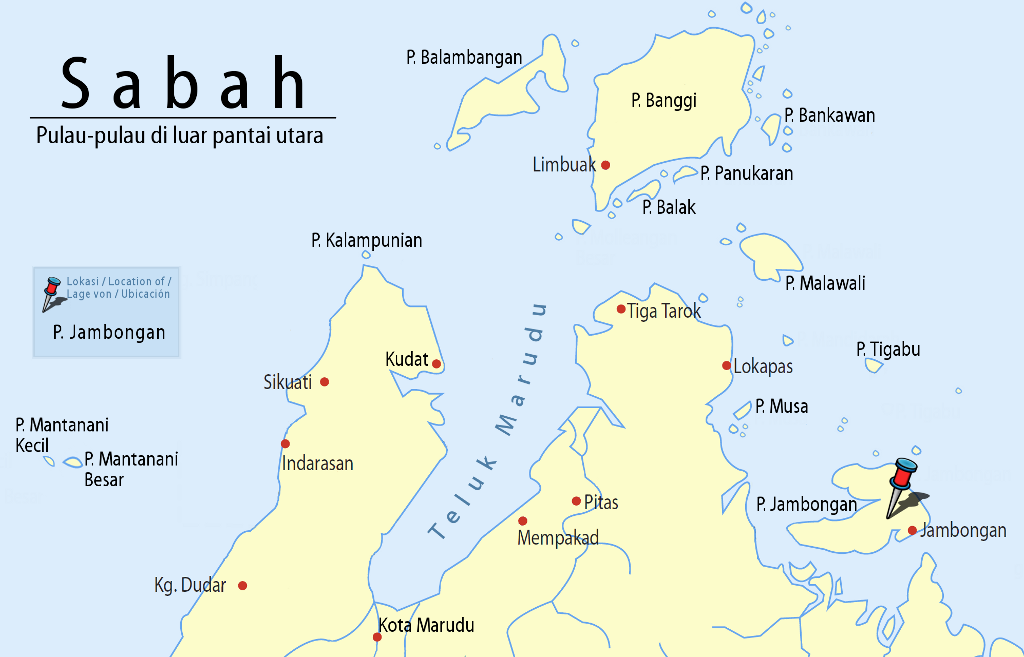
- Location of Jambongan Island within the Sulu Sea

Geography
- Coordinates: 6°41′0″N 117°25′0″E
- Archipelago: Borneo (Greater Sunda Islands)
- Adjacent to: Sulu Sea
- Highest elevation: 156 m (512 ft)
- Highest point: Buli Gantungan Hill (156 metres (512 ft))

Administration
- Malaysia
- State: Sabah
- Division: Sandakan
- District: Paitan

Demographics
- Population: 5,000 (2019)

Jambongan Island (Malay: Pulau Jambongan/Jembongan; Bajau-Suluk: Jambangan) is located on the northern coast of Paitan District, Sabah in Malaysia. With an area of 113 square kilometres (44 sq mi), it is considered the second largest island in Sabah, located in Paitan Bay of the Sandakan Division. Its main settlement, the Jambongan town, is located on the southeast part of the island. As of 2019, the island has an estimated population of 5,000.

== Etymology ==
There are several theories on the origin of the island name. The first comes from the word Jambangan, which refers to an attractive flower, and various types of plants grow around the island. When the British acquired the island, they could not pronounce the word with the correct pronunciation; they were more used to calling the island Jambongan. Since this became the norm, the inhabitants of the island also followed the British way of pronunciation, although a few elderly still call the island by the former name.

The second theory results from the daily usage by British security members stationed on the island in the past that would call the island Jambongan whenever they sent a report or made contact. There is a strong link that the naming occurred throughout the British administration era, when a British governor visited the island with the aim of persuading the local Bajau people from collaborating on the Mat Salleh rebellion against the British. At the time, they brought a bouquet of flowers for the village head, which subsequently resulted in the naming. With the island also rich in its lush greenery, the Jambongan name is also believed to be taken from the local word for "jambongan bunga" (a bouquet of flowers), which are directly connected to the event.

== History ==
The island was once under the thalassocracy of the Sultanate of Brunei, as were many of the areas of northern Borneo before the arrival of European powers, although the island was still uninhabited at the time. Around 1704, Brunei ceded the northern part of Borneo from Kimanis northward, including the islands of Palawan, Banggi, and Balambangan, to the Sultanate of Sulu as a reward for their help during the Brunei Civil War. Among the earliest Bajau-Suluk inhabitants after the Sulu conquest, the island was believed to be once guarded by supernatural beings. Through oral history from the older island generations, the earliest inhabitants, the Suluk people, had communicated with the spirits on the island before being allowed to open up a settlement, where the communication session involved a shaman as an intermediary. A port was firstly opened by the founders, and before they reached the island, this early group first stopped at Libaran and Banggi islands since the living of the group is more focused on the ocean than on the land.

=== British acquisition ===
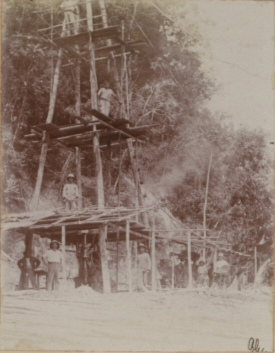
British conducting borehole drilling on the island, c. 1900–1909

In 1877, Sultan Abdul Momin of Brunei granted to both von Overbeck and Alfred Dent of the North Borneo Chartered Company (NBCC) the territories from the Sulaman River to the Paitan River on the northeast coast, including the island of Banggi (spelt as Banguey at the time) and all other islands within three marine leagues of the coast (approximately 16 kilometres (9.9 miles) from the shoreline), as well as from Paitan to the Sibuco River. In 1903, the Sultanate of Sulu further made a confirmation of their cession of all islands that are near to the territory of British North Borneo of the NBCC, from Banggi as far as the Sibuco Bay. In 1894, Governor Charles Vandeleur Creagh established a customs station on the island, staffed by a native clerk and a policeman. This angered Mat Salleh since he had already inherited the administration in the Sugut River from his father (the former Chief of Sulu in the river) and exercised power in the area from the same year. His position was threatened when the NBCC introduced a poll tax and boat permits, which he considered an infringement on the rights of the local community. Following the murder of two Iban Dayaks who are the agents of NBCC on the island where Mat Salleh is implicated, it became one of the sites during the hunt for Mat Salleh by British forces during the Mat Salleh rebellion.

During the Japanese occupation in World War II, the Japanese also imposed taxes on the islanders, but their authorities were seen as more cruel than the British, as they frequently threatened any local villagers found to disobey the Japanese orders, and when they refused, they would immediately be taken away and killed in a very cruel way. Following the killing of a local villager during the wartime, the incident caused heavy worries among the people, and many became resistance members and chose to collaborate much closer with the British. This resulted in a close partnership towards the Allied liberation of Borneo, with the British being perceived by local villagers as a "saviour entity from the cruelty of Japanese administration at the time". Following the defeat of Japan, the British return to administer the island until the late 1950s. Throughout the colonial era, village head became the intermediaries between the colonial administration authorities and local villagers in administration matters and local economic issues. In the 1900s, the British conducted several geological investigations on the island, featuring a boring plant used for exploring mineral resources in the region of North Borneo. In 1908, during the continuous drilling, a fossil specimen was found and reported to the main authorities in London.

=== Present history ===
Since the 1960s, several schools have been established to improve the islanders literacy, both primary and Islamic religious schools. The government also established health clinics; those with more severe health issues will usually be admitted to the main hospitals in Beluran and Sandakan, such as the Beluran Hospital and Duchess of Kent Hospital. A Royal Malaysia Police station and Malaysian Army camp are maintained for security as part of the Eastern Sabah Security Command (ESSCOM) and Eastern Sabah Security Zone (ESSZONE). Health facilities camps are also maintained by the Royal Malaysian Navy yearly, providing free health check-ups/screenings for the islanders for the prevention and early detection of infectious diseases among the people. Local fishermen on the island receiving annual government aid such as fuel subsidy and living allowance through the Malaysia Fisheries Development Authority (MFDA) of Sabah.

== Geography ==
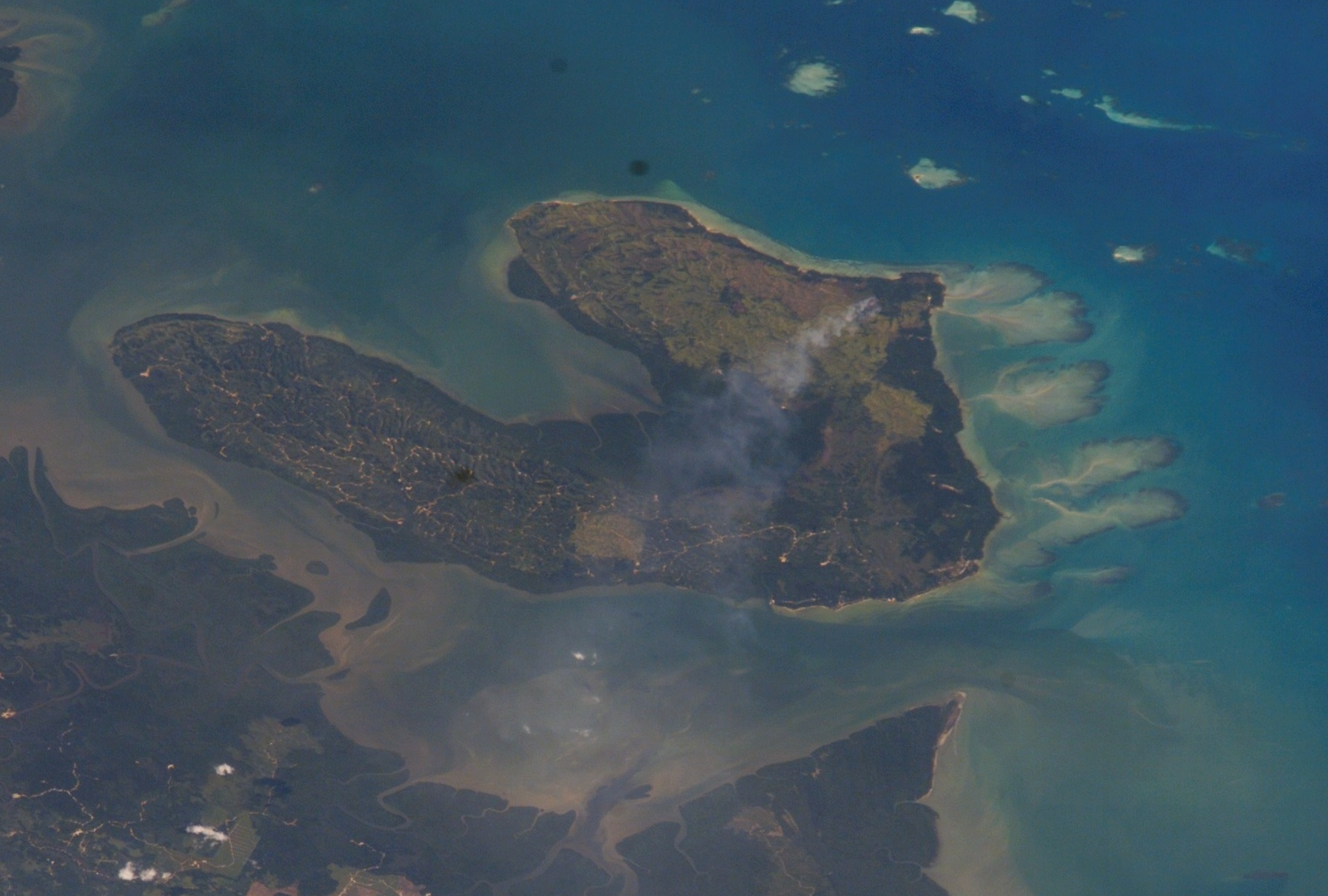
Jambongan Island seen from a NASA satellite, 2002

The island is located within the Coral Triangle Scientific Area. It is part of the Bengkoka lowlands, formed of sandstones and shales of the Bongaya formation with alluvial deposits along the coast; its terrain is generally flat or undulating. Between 50,000 and 9,000 years BP, when the sea level was 36 m below its present level, the island was part of the land region called Greater Sabah, together with Balambangan, Banggi, and Malawali islands. In the present time, among the northern islands of Mandidarah and Malawali, Jambongan has the widest mangrove area. As the second largest island in Sabah, it hosts a variety of biodiversity. The island is also known for its diverse marine life, including various species of fungi and sea cucumbers; these include Aniptodera sp., Sphaerulina orae-maris, and Rhizophila marina. Dugongs have been sighted around the island, although their sightings are rare, together with the Irrawaddy dolphin and the Indo-Pacific humpback dolphin. Due to an El Niño-related fire event around 30 years ago in the 1980s that destroyed much of the natural forest at the Jambongan Forest Reserve, much of the island landscape has been covered with fern and Imperata cylindrica grassland. In 2011, part of the affected area was planted with fast-growing trees to re-establish forest cover. The highest point on the island is Buli Gantungan Hill (Malay: Bukit Buli Gantungan), at a height of 156 metres (512 ft).

=== Climate ===
It experiences a hot and humid equatorial climate with temperatures generally ranging from 26 °C (79 °F) to 32 °C (90 °F) year-round, with rain that can be expected throughout the year. The island's location within the Sulu Sea makes it susceptible to thunderstorms and strong winds while at the same time its lush greenery offering cover from prevailing winds.

=== Conservation sites ===
The island is one of the mangrove forest reserve areas in Sabah, with the sea surrounding the island identified as among the habitat areas for dugongs. The Jambongan Forest Reserve constituted a Class 1 Protection Forest, conserved for protecting the island forests, soil, watersheds, and other essential environmental factors with any timber harvesting is not permitted within the area. The unscrupulous attempt at expansion of oil palm mills has been met with protest since its presence on the island damaged the island's water source and its ecosystems. In 2011, the Kadazan-Dusun indigenous tagal (conservation system) was introduced to the island sea cucumber sites to conserve it following the excessive harvest that damaged its habitat due to trawler activities as well as pollution.

== Demographics ==
The island is inhabited by various ethnicities, with most being from the Bajau-Ubian and Suluk peoples. The Suluks are among the first to establish settlement on Jambongan and are responsible for the island opening. There were also the West Coast Bajau who established their presence on the island.

=== Ethnic groups and languages ===
The main ethnicities on the island are Bajau of Ubian and Suluk, followed by Bugis and Bruneian Malays. The main spoken mother tongue is Tausug (Suluk), Bajau/Ubian, Buginese and Brunei Malay, with the official Malay language understood by most.

=== Religion ===
Since the most ethnic groups inhabiting the island primarily come from the majority Muslim groups, the dominant religion practised is Sunni Islam, with the majority of the inhabitants adhering to it, although among the Muslim communities there were also strong cultural and traditional beliefs deeply rooted in their society, where they incorporate elements of both Islam and their ancestral practices. An Islamic religious school (madrasa) established its presence on the island in 2016, providing free Islamic education for the islanders.

== Economy ==
Fishery and farming became the main source for the islanders income. Deer hunting is also practised by the locals. Trade activities flourished throughout the British administration, with barter practised among the locals. During the British North Borneo era, coal was discovered on the island, which differs from other coals in British Borneo, where it has some of the characteristics of anthracite. The island also became the producer of copra in the 1960s, where much of the produce was sold to the towns of Sandakan and Kudat. Under the present Sabah and Malaysian governance, oil palm plantation was introduced on the island in 2004, with the first factory being Genting Plantations, followed by Sime Darby and TH Plantations. Sea cucumber products such as gamat are harvested around the island. Most of the seaweed related products are sold to the state capital city of Kota Kinabalu and popular among local Malays and Japanese and Korean tourists.

== Transportation ==
The primary mode of transportation to the island is by boat from both the Pitas and Paitan districts, which takes around 1.5 hours. The island offers several anchoring options, especially on the north, while the south and east need precaution for reef. The bays on the west, meanwhile, are very shallow. The operation of small water vessels within the island waters is subject to regulation under the State Ports and Harbours Enactment 2002.

== See also ==
- List of islands of Malaysia
