= Lulworthiaceae =

Scientific classification
- Kingdom: Fungi
- Division: Ascomycota
- Class: Sordariomycetes
- Order: Lulworthiales
- Family: Lulworthiaceae; Kohlm.

Type genus
- Lulworthia G.K. Sutherl.

Family of fungi

The Lulworthiaceae are a family of marine fungi in the Ascomycota, class Sordariomycetes. Species in the family have a widespread distribution in both temperate and tropical oceans, and are typically found growing on submerged wood or on seaweed. In 2000, Molecular analysis of several species of Lulworthia and Lindra led to the reassignment of their parent genera to the new order Lulworthiales in addition to the new family Lulworthiaceae. In 2020, a large fungi study added more genera to the family.

== History and taxonomy ==
The type genus Lulworthia was originally described in 1916 by George Kenneth Sutherland to contain the species Lulworthia fucicola, a fungus found on the seaweed commonly known as the bladder wrack at Lulworth on the coast of Dorset, UK. The fungus has since been collected several times from submerged wood, but never again from the original algal host; it was subsequently reported that specimens found on wood were morphologically different from those originally described growing on algae. Since the original specimens had deteriorated beyond use, a holotype was designated, using submerged-wood specimens found in Chile in 1984.

The genus Rostrupiella was created in 2007 to contain the species Rostrupiella danica, a Lulworthia-like species collected on driftwood found along the Danish coast and from the northwestern coast of the US.

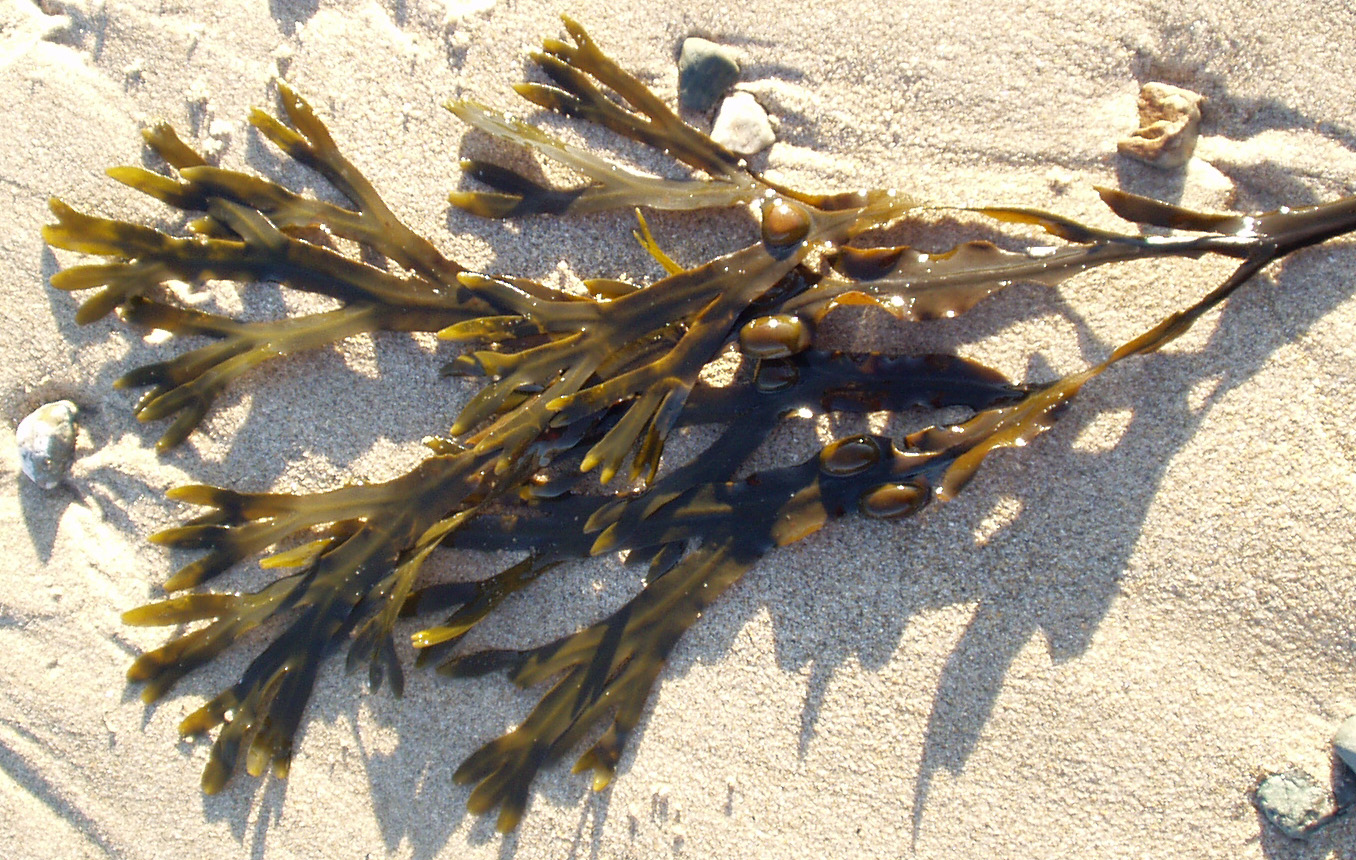
Lulworthia fucicola was originally found on the algae Fucus vesiculosus

== Genera ==
As accepted by Wijayawardene et al. 2020 (with amount of species per genus);

- Cumulospora I. Schmidt (2)
- Halazoon Abdel-Aziz, Abdel-Wahab & Nagah. (2)
- Haloguignardia A. Cribb & J. Cribb (1)
- Hydea K.L. Pang & E.B.G Jones (1)
- Kohlmeyeriella E.B.G. Jones, R.G. Johnson & S.T. Moss (2)
- Lindra I. Wilson (5)
- Lulwoana Kohlm., Volkm.-Kohlm., J. Campb., Spatafora & Gräfenhan (1)
- Lulwoidea Kohlm., Volkm.-Kohlm., J. Campb., Spatafora & Gräfenhan (1)
- Lulworthia G.K. Sutherl (32)
- Matsusporium E.B.G. Jones & K.L. Pang (1)
- Moleospora Abdel-Wahab, Abdel-Aziz & Nagah (1)
- Moromyces Abdel-Wahab, K.L. Pang, Nagah., Abdel-Aziz & E.B.G. Jones (1)
- Orbimyces Linder (1)
- Paralulworthia A. Poli, E. Bovio, L. Ranieri, G.C. Varese & V. Prigione (3)
- Rostrupiella Jørg Koch, K.L. Pang & E.B.G. Jones. (1)
- Sammeyersia S.Y. Guo, E.B.G. Jones & K.L. Pang (1)

== Description ==
The ascomata, roughly spherical to cylindrical in shape, may be either embedded in or on the material to which the fruit body is attached. Atop the ascomata is a small rounded process with an opening (an ostiole) through which ascospores may be released. The brown- to black-colored ascomata can be either leathery (coriaceous) or dark-colored and readily broken (carbonaceous). The internal structure of the ascomata, the centrum, is at first filled with a transparent pseudoparenchyma (a type of tissue made of hyphae that are twisted and matted together) dissolves upon reaching maturity. The Lulworthiaceae have ascospores that are both filamentous, and transparent.
