= Pisorisporium =

Scientific classification
- Kingdom: Fungi
- Division: Ascomycota
- Class: Sordariomycetes
- Order: Pisorisporiales
- Family: Pisorisporiaceae
- Genus: Pisorisporium; Réblová & J. Fourn.

Type species
- Pisorisporium cymbiforme Réblová & J. Fourn.

Genus of fungi

Pisorisporium is a genus of freshwater and terrestrial fungi in the family Pisorisporiaceae and order Pisorisporiales in the subclass Pisorisporiomycetidae.

== Etymology ==
The name Pisorisporium is derived from Pisorum (Latin), meaning peas in a pod, which refers to the numerous guttules (a small drop or drop-like particle) arranged in a chain within ascospores and also spora (another Latin word), referring to the ascospores.

== Description ==
Pisorisporium genera usually have an ascomata (the asci-bearing fruiting body) which is non-stromatic (not encased in the stroma), immersed, gradually erumpent (bursting through a surface) to superficial and solitary or in small groups or rows. It is also papillate (has a small, elongated protuberance on the surface) or with a short beak. It is glabrous (hair-less) with a venter (a protuberant, usually hollow structure) which is subglobose to broadly conical in shape and laterally or basally flattened and upright or lying obliquely or horizontally. The ostiole is periphysate (having short, thread-like filaments that line the opening). The ascomatal wall is fragile and 2-layered, the outer layer is partly carbonaceous (like charcoal). The paraphyses (a sterile upward-growing, basally-attached hypha) is persistent, septate (divided by partitions), hyaline (transparent, glass-like) and arises from the bottom and the sides in the ascomatal cavity. The asci unitunicate (single-walled) with 8 spores and cylindrical-clavate (club shaped). short-stipitate (stalked or stemmed), with a pronounced thimble-shaped amyloid apical annulus annulus and is persistently attached to the ascogenous hyphae (or fertile hyphae) at maturity. The ascospores are fusiform (thimble-shaped), cylindrical to cymbiform (boat-shaped), sometimes falcate (sickle-shaped), hyaline and transversely multiseptate (having many walls). They lack a mucilaginous (thick, gluey substance) sheath or appendages, smooth-walled and with numerous guttules (small drop or drop-like particles). The Asexual morph is unknown (as of 2015).

== Species ==
Only 2 species are accepted by Species Fungorum;

- Pisorisporium cymbiforme Réblová & J. Fourn. (2015) – named after Cymbiform (Latin), meaning boat-shaped (a long rowboat), referring to the shape of the ascospores.
- Pisorisporium glaucum Réblová & J. Fourn. (2015) – named after Glaucus (Latin), meaning blue, referring to the intense blue amyloid reaction of the apical annulus.

== Distribution ==
It has a scattered distribution across the globe. Including France on submerged decorticated wood of Alnus glutinosa and Belgium on driftwood of Acer pseudoplatanus. As Pisorisporium cymbiforme Réblová & J. Fourn. (2014) has been found on decayed woody twigs and branches submerged in freshwater streams in forests within Yunnan Province, China, as well as Satun and Songkhla provinces in Thailand.
