= Diacrochordon =

Scientific classification
- Kingdom: Fungi
- Division: Ascomycota
- Class: Sordariomycetes
- Informal group: Sordariomycetes incertae sedis
- Genus: Diacrochordon; Petr. (1955)

Type species
- Diacrochordon rehmii Petr. (1955)

Genus of fungi

Diacrochordon is a fungal genus in the class Sordariomycetes. The relationship of this taxon to other taxa within the class is unknown (incertae sedis). It is a monotypic genus containing the single species Diacrochordon rehmii, described as new to science in 1955 by mycologist Franz Petrak.
