= Kurssanovia =

Scientific classification
- Kingdom: Fungi
- Division: Ascomycota
- Class: Sordariomycetes
- Informal group: Sordariomycetes incertae sedis
- Genus: Kurssanovia; Kravtzev (1955)

Type species
- Kurssanovia vassiljevskii Kravtzev (1955)

Genus of fungi

Kurssanovia is a genus of fungi within the class Sordariomycetes. The relationship of this taxon to other taxa within the class is unknown (incertae sedis).
