= Apodothina =

Scientific classification
- Kingdom: Fungi
- Division: Ascomycota
- Class: Sordariomycetes
- Order: Phyllachorales
- Family: Phyllachoraceae
- Genus: Apodothina; Petr. 1970

Type species
- Apodothina pringlei (Peck) Petr.

Genus of fungi

Apodothina is a genus of fungi within the class Sordariomycetes. This is a monotypic genus, containing the single species Apodothina pringlei.
