= Myrmecridium =

Scientific classification
- Kingdom: Fungi
- Division: Ascomycota
- Class: Sordariomycetes
- Order: Myrmecridiales
- Family: Myrmecridiaceae
- Genus: Myrmecridium; Arzanlou, W.Gams & Crous (2007)

Type species
- Myrmecridium schulzeri (Sacc.) Arzanlou, W.Gams & Crous (2007)

Genus of fungi

Myrmecridium is a genus of fungi in the class Sordariomycetes. It was circumscribed in 2007 and is distinguished from similar fungi by having entirely hyaline (translucent) vegetative hyphae and widely scattered, pimple-shaped denticles (toothlike projections) on the long hyaline rachis. The generic name derives from a combination of the Ancient Greek word "myrmekia", meaning "wart", and the suffix "-ridium" from "Chloridium" (a genus of Fungi in the family Chaetosphaeriaceae).

Order Myrmecridiales and family Myrmecridiaceae was established to accommodate genus Myrmecridium which was previously placed in subclass Hypocreomycetidae, genera incertae sedis (Crous et al. 2015, Maharachchikumbura et al. 2016).

== Species ==
As accepted by Species Fungorum;

- Myrmecridium banksiae Crous (2012)
- Myrmecridium dactylidis Crous & Osieck (2021)
- Myrmecridium flexuosum (de Hoog) Arzanlou, W. Gams & Crous (2007)
- Myrmecridium fluviae Hyang B. Lee & T.T.T. Nguyen (2017)
- Myrmecridium iridis Crous (2015)
- Myrmecridium junci Crous & Osieck (2021)
- Myrmecridium juncicola Crous & Osieck (2021)
- Myrmecridium juncigenum Crous & Osieck (2021)
- Myrmecridium montsegurinum Réblová & J. Fourn. (2016)
- Myrmecridium obovoideum Jie, Y.L. Jiang, McKenzie & Yong Wang bis (2013)
- Myrmecridium phragmiticola Crous & Akulov (2020)
- Myrmecridium phragmitis Crous (2011)
- Myrmecridium pulvericola Koppel, Visagie, Hirooka & Seifert (2016)
- Myrmecridium sambuci Crous (2021)
- Myrmecridium schulzeri (Sacc.) Arzanlou, W. Gams & Crous (2007)
- Myrmecridium spartii Crous & R.K. Schumach. (2015)
- Myrmecridium splendidum L.L. Liu, J. Yang, K.D. Hyde & Z.Y. Liu (2023)
- Myrmecridium thailandicum Crous & Cheew. (2013)

Former species;

- M. aquaticum Z.L. Luo, K.D. Hyde & H.Y. Su (2019) = Neomyrmecridium aquaticum, Myrmecridiaceae
- M. schulzeri var. tritici (M.B. Ellis) Arzanlou, W. Gams & Crous (2007) = Myrmecridium schulzeri
- M. sorbicola Crous & R.K. Schumach. (2018) = Neomyrmecridium sorbicola, Myrmecridiaceae
