= Koralionastetaceae =

Scientific classification
- Kingdom: Fungi
- Division: Ascomycota
- Class: Sordariomycetes
- Subclass: Lulworthiomycetidae
- Order: Koralionastetales; Kohlm., Volkm.-Kohlm., J. Campb. & Inderb.
- Family: Koralionastetaceae; Kohlm. & Volkm.-Kohlm.

Type genus
- Koralionastes Kohlm. & Volkm.-Kohlm.

Family of fungi

The Koralionastetaceae are a family of fungi in the Ascomycota division. This family was taxonomically classified into class of Sordariomycetes and order of Koralionastetales and subclass Lulworthiomycetidae.

It contained the genus Koralionastes (and its 5 species) and then Pontogeneia Kohlm. was added later. Then in 2009, monotypic order Koralionastetales was published to hold the family.
