= Lindra (fungus) =

Scientific classification
- Kingdom: Fungi
- Division: Ascomycota
- Class: Sordariomycetes
- Order: Lulworthiales
- Family: Lulworthiaceae
- Genus: Lindra; I.M. Wilson

Type species
- Lindra inflata I.M.Wilson (1956)

Genus of fungi

Lindra is a genus of fungi within the family Lulworthiaceae.

== Species ==
As accepted by Species Fungorum;

- Lindra crassa (Kohlm.) Kohlm. & Volkm.-Kohlm. (1991)
- Lindra hawaiiensis Kohlm. & Volkm.-Kohlm. (1987)
- Lindra inflata I.M. Wilson (1956)
- Lindra obtusa Nakagiri & Tubaki (1983)
- Lindra thalassiae Orpurt, Meyers, Boral & Simms (1964)

Former species;

- L. marinera Meyers (1969) = Lindra thalassiae
- L. thalassiae var. crassa Kohlm. (1984) = Lindra crassa
