= Endoxylina =

Scientific classification
- Domain: Eukaryota
- Kingdom: Fungi
- Division: Ascomycota
- Class: Sordariomycetes
- Informal group: Sordariomycetes incertae sedis
- Genus: Endoxylina; Romell (1892)

Type species
- Endoxylina stellulata Romell (1892)

Genus of fungi

Endoxylina is a genus of fungi within the class Sordariomycetes. The relationship of this taxon to other taxa within the class is unknown (incertae sedis).
