= Charonectria =

Scientific classification
- Domain: Eukaryota
- Kingdom: Fungi
- Division: Ascomycota
- Class: Sordariomycetes
- Genus: Charonectria; Sacc.

Type species
- Charonectria consolationis Sacc.

Genus of fungi

Charonectria is a genus of fungi in the family Hyponectriaceae.
