= Iraniella =

Scientific classification
- Kingdom: Fungi
- Division: Ascomycota
- Class: Sordariomycetes
- Informal group: Sordariomycetes incertae sedis
- Genus: Iraniella; Petr. (1949)

Type species
- Iraniella rechingeri Petr. (1949)

Genus of fungi

Iraniella is a fungal genus in the class Sordariomycetes. The relationship of this taxon to other taxa within the class is unknown (incertae sedis). The genus contains the single species Iraniella rechingeri.
