= Naumovela =

Scientific classification
- Kingdom: Fungi
- Division: Ascomycota
- Class: Sordariomycetes
- Informal group: Sordariomycetes incertae sedis
- Genus: Naumovela; Kravtzev (1955)

Species
- N. karakulinii N. octotoma

Genus of fungi

Naumovela is a genus of fungi in the class Sordariomycetes. The relationship of this taxon to other taxa within the class is unknown (incertae sedis). According to the 2007 Outline of Ascomycota, the placement in this class is uncertain.
