= Sporoctomorpha =

Scientific classification
- Kingdom: Fungi
- Division: Ascomycota
- Class: Sordariomycetes
- Informal group: Sordariomycetes incertae sedis
- Genus: Sporoctomorpha; J.V. Almeida & Sousa da Câmara

Genus of fungi

Sporoctomorpha is a genus of fungi within the class Sordariomycetes. The relationship of this taxon to other taxa within the class is unknown (incertae sedis).
