= Clypeoceriospora =

Scientific classification
- Kingdom: Fungi
- Division: Ascomycota
- Class: Sordariomycetes
- Informal group: Sordariomycetes incertae sedis
- Genus: Clypeoceriospora; Sousa da Câmara (1946)

Type species
- Clypeoceriospora rubi Sousa da Câmara (1946)

Genus of fungi

Clypeoceriospora is a fungal genus in the class Sordariomycetes. The relationship of this taxon to other taxa within the class is unknown (incertae sedis). A monotypic genus, Clypeoceriospora contains the single species Clypeoceriospora rubi, described as new to science in 1946.
