= Amphisphaerellula =

Scientific classification
- Kingdom: Fungi
- Division: Ascomycota
- Class: Sordariomycetes
- Informal group: Sordariomycetes incertae sedis
- Genus: Amphisphaerellula; Gucevič (1952)

Type species
- Amphisphaerellula fagi Gucevič (1952)

Species
- A. fagi A. gucevicziae

Genus of fungi

Amphisphaerellula is a genus of fungi within the class Sordariomycetes. The relationship of this taxon to other taxa within the class is unknown (incertae sedis).
