= Leptosporina =

Scientific classification
- Kingdom: Fungi
- Division: Ascomycota
- Class: Sordariomycetes
- Informal group: Sordariomycetes incertae sedis
- Genus: Leptosporina; Chardón (1939)

Type species
- Leptosporina aciculospora Chardón (1939)

Genus of fungi

Leptosporina is a fungal genus in the class Sordariomycetes. The relationship of this taxon to other taxa in the class is unknown (incertae sedis). The genus is monotypic, containing the single species Leptosporina aciculospora, described as new to science in 1939 by Puerto Rican mycologist Carlos E. Chardón.
