= Neolamya =

Scientific classification
- Kingdom: Fungi
- Division: Ascomycota
- Class: Sordariomycetes
- Informal group: Sordariomycetes incertae sedis
- Genus: Neolamya; Theiss. & Syd. (1918)

Type species
- Neolamya peltigerae (Mont.) Theiss. & Syd. (1918)

Species
- N. ahtii N. peltigerae N. xanthoparmeliae

Genus of fungi

Neolamya is a genus of fungi in the class Sordariomycetes. The relationship of this taxon to other taxa within the class is unknown (incertae sedis).

The genus name of Neolamya is in honour of Pierre Marie Édouard Lamy de la Chapelle (1804–1886), who was a French botanist.

The genus was circumscribed by Ferdinand Theissen and Hans Sydow in Ann. Mycol. vol.16 on page 29 in 1918.

== Species ==
- Neolamya ahtii Zhurb. (2017)
- Neolamya peltigerae (Mont.) Theiss. & Syd. (1918)
- Neolamya xanthoparmeliae Kocourk. (2009)
