= Ascoyunnania =

Scientific classification
- Kingdom: Fungi
- Division: Ascomycota
- Class: Sordariomycetes
- Informal group: Sordariomycetes incertae sedis
- Genus: Ascoyunnania; L.Cai & K.D.Hyde (2005)

Type species
- Ascoyunnania aquatica L.Cai & K.D.Hyde (2005)

Genus of fungi

Ascoyunnania is a fungal genus in the class Sordariomycetes. The relationship of this taxon to other taxa within the class is unknown (incertae sedis). The genus is monotypic, containing the single species Ascoyunnania aquatica, which was found growing on bamboo submerged in a stream in Yunnan, China.
