= Glabrotheca =

Scientific classification
- Domain: Eukaryota
- Kingdom: Fungi
- Division: Ascomycota
- Class: Sordariomycetes
- Family: incertae sedis
- Genus: Glabrotheca; Chardón (1939)

Type species
- Glabrotheca aciculispora Chardón (1939)

Genus of fungi

Glabrotheca is a genus of fungi within the class Sordariomycetes. The relationship of this taxon to other taxa within the class is unknown (incertae sedis). A monotypic genus, Glabrotheca contains the single species Glabrotheca aciculispora, described as new to science in 1993 by Puerto Rican mycologist Carlos E. Chardón.
