= Dasysphaeria =

Scientific classification
- Kingdom: Fungi
- Division: Ascomycota
- Class: Sordariomycetes
- Informal group: Sordariomycetes incertae sedis
- Genus: Dasysphaeria; Speg. (1912)

Type species
- Dasysphaeria andicola Speg. (1912)

Genus of fungi

Dasysphaeria is a genus of fungi within the class Sordariomycetes. The relationship of this taxon to other taxa within the class is unknown (incertae sedis). The genus is monotypic, containing the single species Dasysphaeria andicola.
