= Ascorhiza =

Scientific classification
- Kingdom: Fungi
- Division: Ascomycota
- Class: Sordariomycetes
- Informal group: Sordariomycetes incertae sedis
- Genus: Ascorhiza; Lecht.-Trnka (1931)

Type species
- Ascorhiza leguminosarum Lecht.-Trinka (1931)

Genus of fungi

Ascorhiza is a genus of fungi within the class Sordariomycetes. The relationship of this taxon to other taxa within the class is unknown (incertae sedis). This is a monotypic genus, containing the single species Ascorhiza leguminosarum, which grows in the tubercles of Astragalus alopecuroides.
