= Lulwoidea =

Scientific classification
- Kingdom: Fungi
- Division: Ascomycota
- Class: Sordariomycetes
- Order: Lulworthiales
- Family: Lulworthiaceae
- Genus: Lulwoidea; Kohlm., Volkm.-Kohlm., J.Campb., Spatafora & Gräfenhan (2005)

Type species
- Lulwoidea lignoarenaria (Jørg.Koch & E.B.G.Jones) Kohlm., Volkm.-Kohlm., J.Campb., Spatafora & Gräfenhan (2005)

Synonyms
- Lulworthia lignoarenaria Jørg. Koch & E.B.G. Jones, Mycotaxon 20(2): 389 (1984)

Genus of fungi

Lulwoidea is a genus of fungi within the Lulworthiaceae family. This is a monotypic genus, containing the single species Lulwoidea lignoarenaria. It was published in Mycol. Res. vol.109 (5) on page 564 in 2005.
