= Rivulicola =

Scientific classification
- Kingdom: Fungi
- Division: Ascomycota
- Class: Sordariomycetes
- Family: Annulatascaceae
- Genus: Rivulicola; K.D.Hyde (1997)

Type species
- Rivulicola incrustata K.D.Hyde (1997)

Species
- R. aquatica R. cygnea R. incrustata

Genus of fungi

Rivulicola is a genus of fungi in the class Sordariomycetes. The relationship of this taxon to other taxa within the class is unknown (incertae sedis).
