= Clohiesia =

Scientific classification
- Kingdom: Fungi
- Division: Ascomycota
- Class: Sordariomycetes
- Family: Annulatascaceae
- Genus: Clohiesia; K.D.Hyde (1995)

Type species
- Clohiesia corticola K.D.Hyde (1995)

Species
- C. corticola C. curvispora C. lignicola

Genus of fungi

Clohiesia is a genus of fungi in the family Annulatascaceae of the Ascomycota. They inhabit fresh water.

The relationship of this taxon to other taxa within the Sordariomycetes class is unknown (incertae sedis), and it has not yet been placed with certainty into any order.

== Species ==
- Clohiesia corticola
- Clohiesia curvispora
- Clohiesia lignicola
