= Anthostomellina =

Scientific classification
- Kingdom: Fungi
- Division: Ascomycota
- Class: Sordariomycetes
- Informal group: Sordariomycetes incertae sedis
- Genus: Anthostomellina; Kantsh.

Type species
- Anthostomellina carpinea L.A. Kantsch.

Genus of fungi

Anthostomellina is a genus of fungi within the class Sordariomycetes. The relationship of this taxon to other taxa within the class is unknown (incertae sedis).
