= Stomatogenella =

Scientific classification
- Kingdom: Fungi
- Division: Ascomycota
- Class: Sordariomycetes
- Order: incertae sedis
- Family: incertae sedis
- Genus: Stomatogenella; Petr.

Genus of fungi

Stomatogenella is a genus of fungi within the class Sordariomycetes. The relationship of this taxon to other taxa within the class is unknown (incertae sedis).
