= Ticomyces =

Scientific classification
- Kingdom: Fungi
- Division: Ascomycota
- Class: Sordariomycetes
- Order: Meliolales
- Family: Meliolaceae
- Genus: Ticomyces; Toro

Genus of fungi

Ticomyces is a genus of fungi within the Meliolaceae family.
