= Ophiomassaria =

Scientific classification
- Kingdom: Fungi
- Division: Ascomycota
- Class: Sordariomycetes
- Informal group: Sordariomycetes incertae sedis
- Genus: Ophiomassaria; Jacz. (1894)

Type species
- Ophiomassaria selenospora (G.H.Otth) Jacz. (1894)

Genus of fungi

Ophiomassaria is a genus of fungi in the class Sordariomycetes. The relationship of this taxon to other taxa within the class is unknown (incertae sedis).
