= Leptosacca =

Scientific classification
- Kingdom: Fungi
- Division: Ascomycota
- Class: Sordariomycetes
- Informal group: Sordariomycetes incertae sedis
- Genus: Leptosacca; Syd. (1928)

Type species
- Leptosacca lumae Syd. (1928)

Genus of fungi

Leptosacca is a fungal genus in the class Sordariomycetes. The relationship of this taxon to other taxa within the class is unknown (incertae sedis). The genus is monotypic, containing the single species Leptosacca lumae.
