= Clypeosphaerulina =

Scientific classification
- Kingdom: Fungi
- Division: Ascomycota
- Class: Sordariomycetes
- Informal group: Sordariomycetes incertae sedis
- Genus: Clypeosphaerulina; Sousa da Câmara (1939)

Type species
- Clypeosphaerulina vincae (Sousa da Câmara) Sousa da Câmara (1939)

Genus of fungi

Clypeosphaerulina is a fungal genus in the class Sordariomycetes. The relationship of this taxon to other taxa within the class is unknown (incertae sedis). A monotypic genus, it contains the single species Clypeosphaerulina vincae.
