= Hydronectria =

Scientific classification
- Kingdom: Fungi
- Division: Ascomycota
- Class: Sordariomycetes
- Informal group: Sordariomycetes incertae sedis
- Genus: Hydronectria; Kirschst. (1925)

Type species
- Hydronectria kriegeriana Kirschst. (1925)

Genus of fungi

Hydronectria is a genus of fungi in the class Sordariomycetes. The relationship of this taxon to other taxa within the class is unknown (incertae sedis). A monotypic genus, it contains the single species Hydronectria kriegeriana, described by German mycologist Wilhelm Kirschstein in 1925.
