= Acerbiella =

Scientific classification
- Kingdom: Fungi
- Division: Ascomycota
- Class: Sordariomycetes
- Informal group: Sordariomycetes incertae sedis
- Genus: Acerbiella; Sacc. (1905)

Type species
- Acerbiella macrospora (Rick) Sacc. & D.Sacc. (1905)

Species
- A. acicularis A. aquiliformis A. macrospora A. violacea

Genus of fungi

Acerbiella is a genus of fungi within the class Sordariomycetes. The relationship of this taxon to other taxa within the class is unknown (incertae sedis).
