= Romellina =

Scientific classification
- Kingdom: Fungi
- Division: Ascomycota
- Class: Sordariomycetes
- Family: incertae sedis
- Genus: Romellina; Petr.

Genus of fungi

Romellina is a monotypic, genus of fungi within the class Sordariomycetes. It has only one known species, Romellina variabilis Petr. (1955).

The genus was circumscribed by Franz Petrak in Sydowia vol.9 (1-6) on page 597 in 1955.

The genus name of Romellina is in honour of Lars Romell (1854–1927), who was a Swedish botanist and mycologist, he was a teacher in Stockholm, then between 1890 - 1927, he was a patent attorney.

The relationship of this taxon to other taxa within the class is unknown (incertae sedis).
