= Rhamphosphaeria =

Scientific classification
- Kingdom: Fungi
- Division: Ascomycota
- Class: Sordariomycetes
- Family: incertae sedis
- Genus: Rhamphosphaeria; Kirschst.

Type species
- Rhamphosphaeria capillata Kirschst. (1936)

Genus of fungi

Rhamphosphaeria is a monotypic genus of fungi within the class Sordariomycetes. The relationship of this taxon to other taxa within the class is unknown (incertae sedis). It only contains one known species, Rhamphosphaeria capillata, which was found on Typha angustifolia in Germany.
