= Mirannulata =

Scientific classification
- Kingdom: Fungi
- Division: Ascomycota
- Class: Sordariomycetes
- Informal group: Sordariomycetes incertae sedis
- Genus: Mirannulata; Huhndorf, F.A.Fernández, A.N.Mill. & Lodge (2003)

Type species
- Mirannulata samuelsii Huhndorf, F.A.Fernández, A.N.Mill. & Lodge (2003)

Species
- M. costaricensis M. samuelsii

Genus of fungi

Mirannulata is a genus of fungi in the class Sordariomycetes. The relationship of this taxon to other taxa within the class is unknown (incertae sedis).
