= Afareyanaj =

Afareyanaj افريانج
- Village
- Location within Iran
- Coordinates: 34°52′05″N 47°47′10″E
- Country: Iran
- Province: Kermanshah
- County: Sonqor
- Bakhsh: Central
- Rural District: Ab Barik

Population (2006)
  - Total: 106
- Time zone: UTC+3:30 (IRST)
  - Summer (DST): UTC+4:30 (IRDT)

Afareyanaj (Persian: افريانج, also Romanized as Āfareyānaj, Āfarīānaj, and Āfaryānaj; also known as Āfarīānach, Āferyānech, and Ruferīāneh) is a village in Ab Barik Rural District, in the Central District of Sonqor County, Kermanshah Province, Iran. At the 2006 census, its population was 106, in 32 families.
