= Lecythium =

Scientific classification
- Domain: Eukaryota
- Clade: Sar
- Clade: Rhizaria
- Phylum: Cercozoa
- Class: Thecofilosea
- Order: Tectofilosida
- Family: Chlamydophryidae
- Genus: Lecythium; Hertwig & Lesser

Type species
- Lecythium hyalinum

Genus of single-celled organisms

Lecythium is a genus of testate amoebae within the Chlamydophryidae. These amoebae bear a thin and hyaline test and are common in freshwater and soil, one marine species is known. Lecythium spp. feed on fungi or algae.

== Described Lecythium species ==
- Lecythium hyalinum (type species)
- Lecythium granulatus
- Lecythium minutum
- Lecythium kryptosis
- Lecythium mutabilis
- Lecythium terrestris
- Lecythium spinosum
