= Ameromassaria =

Scientific classification
- Kingdom: Fungi
- Division: Ascomycota
- Class: Sordariomycetes
- Informal group: Sordariomycetes incertae sedis
- Genus: Ameromassaria; Hara (1918)

Type species
- Ameromassaria japonica Hara (1918)

Genus of fungi

Ameromassaria is a genus of fungi within the class Sordariomycetes. The relationship of this taxon to other taxa within the class is unknown (incertae sedis). This is a monotypic genus, containing the single species Ameromassaria japonica.
