= Pontogeneia (fungus) =

Scientific classification
- Kingdom: Fungi
- Division: Ascomycota
- Class: Sordariomycetes
- Family: incertae sedis
- Genus: Pontogeneia; Speg.

Genus of fungi

Pontogeneia is a genus of fungi within the class Sordariomycetes and Lulworthiomycetidae subclass.

== Species ==
As accepted by Species Fungorum;

- Pontogeneia calospora (Pat.) Kohlm. (1975)
- Pontogeneia codiicola (Dowson) Kohlm. & E. Kohlm. (1979)
- Pontogeneia cubensis (Har. & Pat.) Kohlm. (1975)
- Pontogeneia enormis (Pat. & Har.) Kohlm. (1975)
- Pontogeneia erikae Kohlm. (1981)
- Pontogeneia microdictyi Kohlm. & Volkm.-Kohlm. (2009)
- Pontogeneia padinae Kohlm. (1975)
- Pontogeneia valoniopsidis (Cribb & J.W. Cribb) Kohlm. (1975)
