= Azbukinia =

Scientific classification
- Kingdom: Fungi
- Division: Ascomycota
- Class: Sordariomycetes
- Informal group: Sordariomycetes incertae sedis
- Genus: Azbukinia; Lar.N.Vasiljeva (1989)

Type species
- Azbukinia ferruginea (Fuckel) Lar.N.Vassiljeva (1989)

Genus of fungi

Azbukinia is a fungal genus in the class Sordariomycetes. The relationship of this taxon to other taxa within the class is unknown (incertae sedis). This is a monotypic genus, containing the single species Azbukinia ferruginea.
