= Lulworthiales =

Scientific classification
- Kingdom: Fungi
- Division: Ascomycota
- Class: Sordariomycetes
- Subclass: Lulworthiomycetidae
- Order: Lulworthiales; Kohlm., Spatafora & Volkm.-Kohlm., 2000

Families
- Lulworthiaceae

Order of fungi

Lulworthiales is a monotypic order of fungi in the class Sordariomycetes and also subclass Lulworthiomycetidae.

The order Lulworthiales, with its sole family Lulworthiaceae, consists of strictly marine fungal genera found on a wide range of substrates such as seagrasses (including Posidonia oceanica), seaweeds, and seafoam. Order Lulworthiales was introduced on the basis of morphological characters and phylogenetic analyses built upon LSU and SSU partial sequences to accommodate the polyphyletic genera Lulworthia and Lindra.

Members of this family (and order) are well-known cellulase producers and can break down complex lignocellulose compounds, thus contributing to the recycling of nutrients. Morphologically, they are characterized by ascomata which is subglobose to cylindrical, 8-spored asci, cylindrical to fusiform and filamentous ascospores with end chambers filled with mucus (the latter character is missing in Lindra).

== See also ==
- List of fungal orders
