= Sordariomycetes =

- Clockwise from top left: Nectria cinnabarina (coral spot); Hypomyces lactifluorum (lobster mushroom); Xylaria hypoxylon (candlestick fungus); Daldinia concentrica (King Alfred's cakes); Ophiocordyceps humbertii; Pestalotiopsis funerea; Xylaria polymorpha (dead man's fingers); and Beauveria

Scientific classification
- Kingdom: Fungi
- Division: Ascomycota
- Clade: Saccharomyceta
- Subdivision: Pezizomycotina
- Clade: Leotiomyceta
- (unranked): Sordariomyceta
- Class: Sordariomycetes; O.E.Erikss. & Winka, Myconet 1 (1): 10 (1997)

Subclasses
- Diaporthomycetidae; Hypocreomycetidae; Lulworthiomycetidae; Pisorisporiomycetidae; Savoryellomycetidae; Sordariomycetidae; Xylariomycetidae

Class of fungi

Sordariomycetes is a class of fungi in the subdivision Pezizomycotina (Ascomycota). It is the second-largest class of Ascomycota, with a worldwide distribution that mostly accommodates terrestrial based taxa, although several can also be found in aquatic habitats. Some are phytopathogens that can cause leaf, stem, and root diseases in a wide variety of hosts, while other genera can cause diseases in arthropods and mammals.

The name Sordariomycetes is derived from the Latin sordes (filth) because some species grow in animal feces, though growth habits vary widely across the class.

In 2013, it consisted of 3 subclasses, 12 orders, 600 genera and 3000 species, Then by 2015, it had 3 subclasses, 28 orders, 90 families and 1344 genera. This has increased to 4 subclasses and 54 orders in 2020. It then increased to 6 subclasses and 54 orders in 2023. In May 2023, the GBIF listed 26,295 species in Sordariomycetes.

Sordariomycetes generally produce their asci in perithecial fruiting bodies.

Sordariomycetes are also known as Pyrenomycetes, from the Greek πυρἠν - 'the stone of a fruit' - because of the usually somewhat tough texture of their tissue.

Sordariomycetes possess great variability in morphology, growth form, and habitat. Most have perithecial (flask-shaped) fruiting bodies, but ascomata can be less frequently cleistothecial (such as in the genera Anixiella, Apodus, Boothiella, Thielavia and Zopfiella). Fruiting bodies may be solitary or gregarious, superficial, or immersed within stromata or tissues of the substrates and can be light to bright or black. Members of this group can grow in soil, sand, rocks, dung, leaf litter, and decaying wood as decomposers, as well as being fungal parasites, and insect, human, and plant pathogens.

Sordariomycetes are one of the classes that can also be found in the sea, such as orders, Lulworthiales and Koralionastetales, which were placed in the subclass Lulworthiomycetidae, consist of exclusively marine taxa.

Some species of Sordariomycetes are economically important as bio-control agents, and other genera can produce a wide range of chemically diverse metabolites, that are important in agricultural, medicinal and other biotechnological industries.

== Subclasses and orders ==
As accepted by Wijayawardene et al. 2022.

Subclass Diaporthomycetidae

- Annulatascales
- Atractosporales
- Calosphaeriales
- Diaporthales
- Distoseptisporales
- Jobellisiales
- Magnaporthales
- Myrmecridiales
- Ophiostomatales
- Pararamichloridiales
- Phomatosporales
- Sporidesmiales
- Tirisporellales
- Togniniales
- Xenospadicoidales

Subclass Hypocreomycetidae

- Cancellidiales
- Coronophorales (Melanosporales)
- Falcocladiales
- Glomerellales
- Hypocreales
- Microascales (Halosphaeriales)
- Parasympodiellales
- Torpedosporales

Subclass Lulworthiomycetidae

- Koralionastetales (contains family Koralionastetaceae with genera; Koralionastes and Pontogeneia)
- Lulworthiales

Subclass Pisorisporiomycetidae

- Pisorisporiales (contains family Pisorisporiaceae and genera; Achroceratosphaeria and Pisorisporium)

Subclass Savoryellomycetidae

- Conioscyphales (contains family Conioscyphaceae and genus Conioscypha)
- Fuscosporellales (contains family Fuscosporellaceae with genera; Bactrodesmiastrum, Fuscosporella, Mucispora, Parafuscosporella, Plagiascoma and Pseudoascotaiwania)
- Pleurotheciales (contains family Pleurotheciaceae with genera; Adelosphaeria, Anapleurothecium, Helicoascotaiwania, Melanotrigonum, Neomonodictys, Phaeoisaria, Pleurotheciella, Pleurothecium and Sterigmatobotrys)
- Savoryellales (contains family Savoryellaceae with genera; Ascotaiwania, Canalisporium, Dematiosporium, Monotosporella, Neoascotaiwania and Savoryella)

Subclass Sordariomycetidae

- Boliniales
- Cephalothecales
- Chaetosphaeriales
- Coniochaetales
- Meliolales
- Phyllachorales
- Pseudodactylariales
- Sordariales

Subclass Xylariomycetidae

- Amphisphaeriales (includes Apiosporaceae )
- Delonicicolales
- Xylariales

== Order incertae sedis ==
- Amplistromatales
- Catabotryales
- Spathulosporales
- Tracyllalales
- Trichosphaeriales
- Vermiculariopsiellales

== Familia incertae sedis ==
These are families in the Sordariomycetes whose taxonomic affinities are not sufficiently well known to be placed in any order.

- Batistiaceae
- Obryzaceae
- Papulosaceae
- Plectosphaerellaceae
- Thyridiaceae (contains Balzania, Mattirolia, Pleurocytospora, Sinosphaeria, Thyridium, Thyronectria and Thyronectroidea)
- Vialaeaceae

== Genera incertae sedis ==
These 108 genera within the Sordariomycetes have an uncertain taxonomic placement (incertae sedis), according to the 2007 Outline of Ascomycota. A question mark preceding the genus name means the placement of that genus within this order is uncertain. Abyssomyces – Acerbiella – Acrospermoides – Ameromassaria – Amphisphaerellula – Amphisphaerina – Amphorulopsis – Amylis – Anthostomaria – Anthostomellina – Apharia – Apodothina – Apogaeumannomyces – Aquadulciospora – Aquamarina – Aropsiclus – Ascorhiza – Ascoyunnania – Assoa – Aulospora – Azbukinia – Bactrosphaeria – Barrina – Biporispora – Bombardiastrum – Brenesiella – Byrsomyces – Byssotheciella – Caleutypa – Calosphaeriopsis – Caproniella – Chaetoamphisphaeria – Charonectria – Ciliofusospora – Clohiesia – Clypeoceriospora – Clypeosphaerulina – Cryptoascus – Cryptomycina – Cryptovalsa – Cucurbitopsis – Curvatispora – Dasysphaeria – Delpinoella – Diacrochordon – Dontuzia – Dryosphaera – Endoxylina – Esfandiariomyces – Frondisphaera – Glabrotheca – Heliastrum – Hyaloderma – Hydronectria – Hypotrachynicola – Immersisphaeria – Iraniella – Khuskia – Konenia – Kravtzevia – Kurssanovia – Lecythium – Leptosacca – Leptosphaerella – Leptosporina – Lyonella – Mangrovispora – Melomastia – Microcyclephaeria – Mirannulata – Monosporascus – Myrmecridium – ?Naumovela – ?Neocryptospora – Neolamya – Neothyridaria – Oceanitis – Ophiomassaria – Ornatispora – Pareutypella – Phomatospora – Phyllocelis – Plectosphaerella – Pleocryptospora – Pleosphaeria – Pontogeneia – Porodiscus – Protocucurbitaria – Pulvinaria – Pumilus – Rehmiomycella – Rhamphosphaeria – Rhizophila – Rimaconus – Rhopographella – Rhynchosphaeria – Rivulicola – Romellina – Saccardoella – Sarcopyrenia – Sartorya – Scharifia – Scoliocarpon – Scotiosphaeria – Servaziella – Sporoctomorpha – Stearophora – Stegophorella – Stellosetifera – Stomatogenella – Sungaiicola – Synsphaeria – Tamsiniella – Thelidiella – Thyridella – Thyrotheca – Trichospermella – Trichosphaeropsis – Vleugelia – Zignoina
