= Ascospore =

Spores produced in an ascus

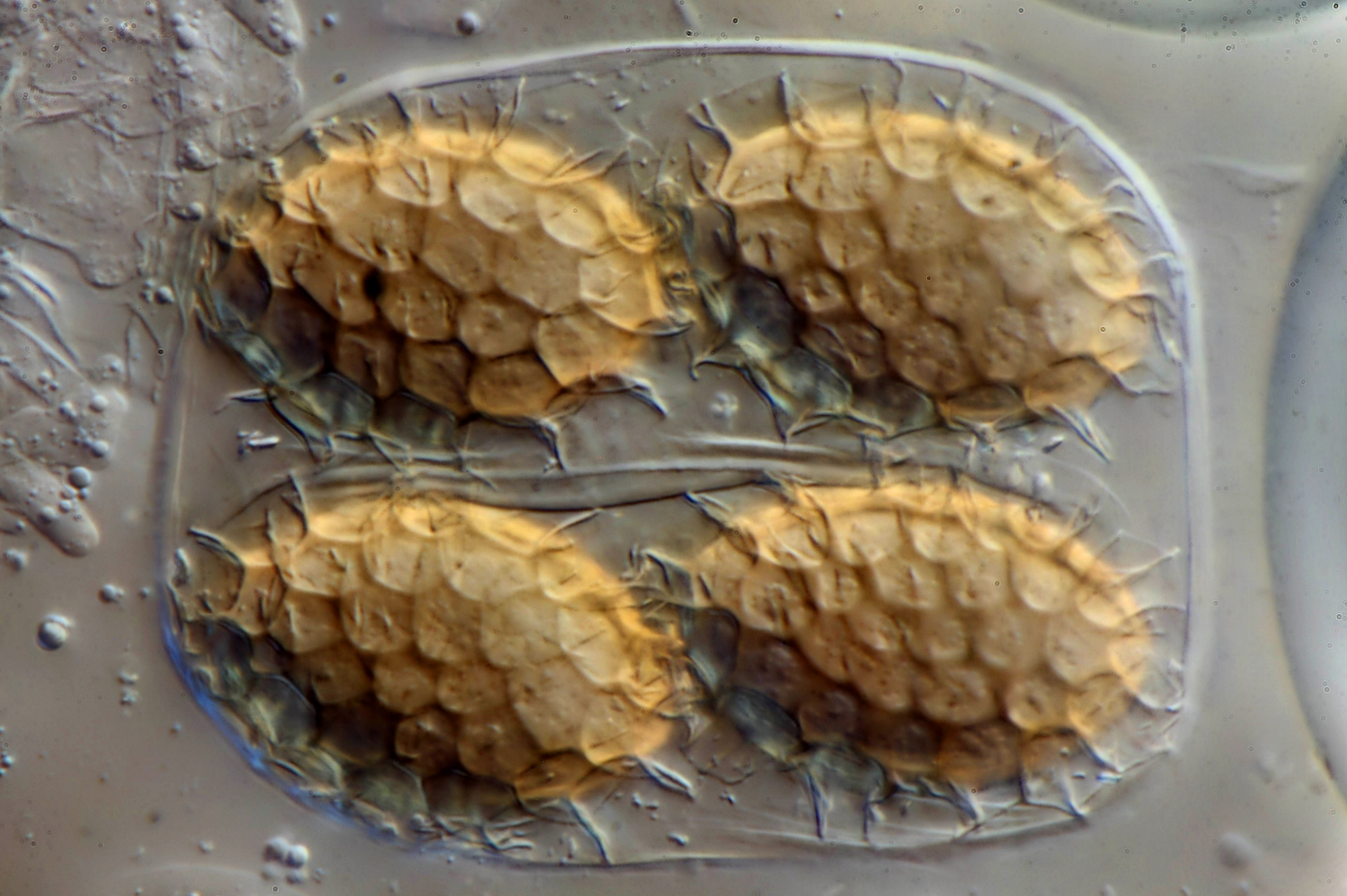
Four ornamented ascospores of the Oregon white truffle (Tuber oregonense) inside a single ascus. Each ellipsoid spore shows the typical honey-gold colour and ornamentation of polygonal pits bordered by low ridges.

In fungi, an ascospore is the sexual spore formed inside an ascus, a sac-like cell. Asci define the division Ascomycota, the largest and most diverse division of fungi. After two parental nuclei fuse, the ascus undergoes meiosis (which halves genetic material) followed by a mitosis (a cell division). This typically produces eight haploid ascospores (four genetically distinct pairs). Many yeasts produce four instead, whereas some moulds produce dozens by adding extra divisions. Many asci build internal pressure and shoot spores past the thin still-air layer that clings to the fruit body. By contrast, subterranean truffles usually rely on animals to spread spores.

Development shapes both the form of ascospores and how well they survive stress. In many fungi, a hook-shaped crozier helps organize the paired nuclei. The ascus then partitions its contents with a double-membrane system, and the young spores build layered walls of β-glucan and chitosan, plus additional protective layers that vary among groups. Mature ascospore walls may be smooth, ridged, spiny, or gelatinous, and range in colour from hyaline to jet-black. In some species these walls allow spores to survive pasteurization, deep-freezing, desiccation and ultraviolet radiation. Dormant spores can lie inert for years until heat shock, seasonal wetting or other cues trigger germ tube emergence. Such structural and developmental traits are mainstays of fungal taxonomy and phylogenetic inference.

Ascospore biology also matters outside microscopy. Airborne showers initiate apple scab epidemics and other plant diseases, heat-resistant spores of Talaromyces and Paecilomyces spoil shelf-stable fruit products, and geneticists dissect ordered tetrads of Saccharomyces to map genes and breed new brewing strains. Industry banks hardy spores of Aspergillus and Penicillium to seed cheese-ripening and enzyme production, and melanin-rich ascospores are also tracked in the night-time lower atmosphere, where they can act as nuclei for cloud droplets and even ice at −5 °C (23 °F). Because of their combined functions in evolution, ecology, agriculture, biotechnology and atmospheric processes, ascospores are a key means by which many fungi persist and spread.

== Terminology and historical context ==
The term ascus (plural asci) derives from the Greek askós, meaning 'sac' or 'wineskin'. It was applied in the 1830s to the spore-bearing sac of Ascomycota. Before the terms were formalised, Pier Antonio Micheli's 1729 work Nova plantarum genera depicted an ascus containing four ellipsoid spores. This is the earliest known published image of ascospores. In 1788, Johann Hedwig showed that Scutellinia scutellata typically produces eight spores per ascus. In 1816, Christian Gottfried Daniel Nees von Esenbeck redefined the botanical term theca to refer only to moss capsules and adopted ascus for these fungal sacs.

The word ascospore (literally "spore from an ascus") first appeared in 1875, after microscopists confirmed that asci contain distinct reproductive spores. Alfred Möller is credited with being the first to grow a lichen thallus (Lecanora chlarotera) from an ascospore in 1887. In the late 1800s, Heinrich Anton de Bary proposed that the ascus functions as a sexual organ. This was confirmed in 1894 by P.A. Dangeard, who observed nuclear fusion (karyogamy) and meiosis inside Peziza asci, demonstrating that ascospores are formed through sexual reproduction. Subsequent work by Harold Wager and A. Harry Harper clarified the nuclear events inside the ascus: two meiotic divisions followed by a mitosis, producing the usual eight ascospores in many species. These findings confirmed that ascospores are sexual offspring in Ascomycota, rather than asexual spores.

During the 20th century, fungi without known asci or ascospores were grouped into an artificial category called Deuteromycota, or "fungi imperfecti". Advances in culture methods and DNA sequencing later showed that most of these supposedly asexual fungi are actually Ascomycota, even if their sexual stages are rarely seen. Genetic evidence has connected many presumed asexual lineages to ascospore-forming ancestors, reaffirming the central role of the ascus and ascospores in the life cycles of most sac fungi. In response, the International Code of Nomenclature for algae, fungi, and plants unified in 2011 the naming of anamorph and teleomorphs (asexual and sexual forms) under a single scientific name, recognizing that both stages are part of the same species.

== Taxonomic context and phylogeny ==
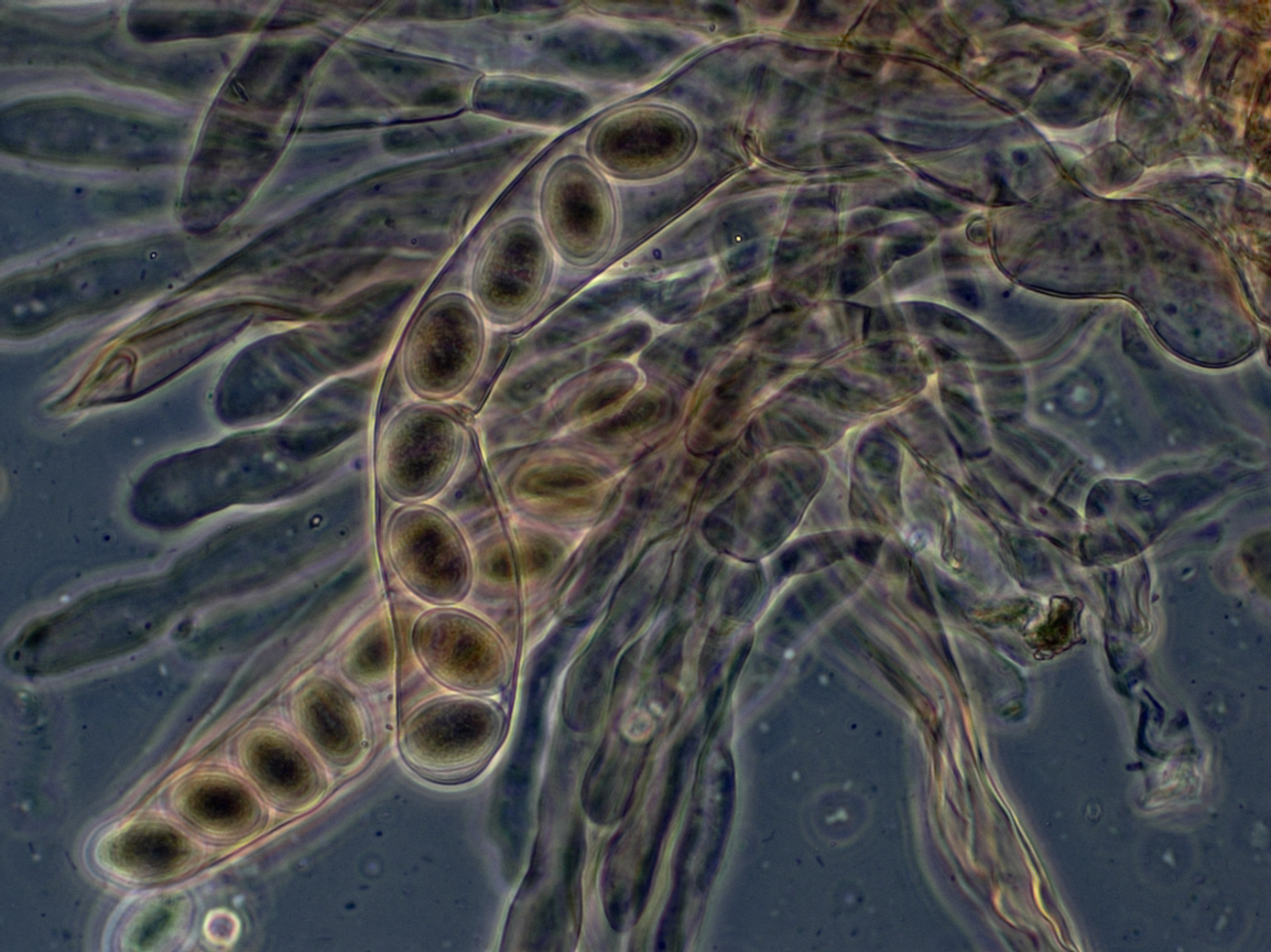
Eight-spored asci of the morel species Morchella elata (phase-contrast)

Ascospores are the defining sexual spores of the division Ascomycota, which together with the Basidiomycota comprises one of the two major lineages of the fungal kingdom. The ability to produce ascospores likely appeared early in Ascomycota evolution. In evolutionary terms, it is a synapomorphy: a shared derived trait that helps define Ascomycota as a group. Comparative studies indicate that ascospore-producing fungi (ascomycetes) and basidiospore-producing fungi (basidiomycetes) share a common ancestor that included a dikaryotic stage (cells with two separate nuclei), but evolved different spore-producing structures and dispersal strategies. About two-thirds of all described fungal species (around 100,000) belong to Ascomycota. Molecular surveys suggest that millions more ascospore-producing species remain undiscovered, particularly among microscopic endophytes and soil-dwelling saprobes.

Historically, ascospore traits such as size, colour, septation, and surface texture were central to fungal classification. In modern analyses, DNA-based phylogenies are primary, but ascospore morphology still aids in defining species boundaries. Molecular identification often begins with sequencing the internal transcribed spacer (ITS) region, a standard DNA "barcode" region used to tell fungal species apart. Additional markers are often used to separate cryptic species that look similar under the microscope. DNA barcodes are compared to reference libraries like UNITE and GenBank. MycoBank links these sequences to formal species names and physical specimens, preserving the connection between morphology and genetic identity. Molecular phylogenies have generally supported traditional groupings based on ascus and ascospore traits. However, many spore forms show homoplasy: similar traits can evolve independently in unrelated lineages, which can mislead classification. An exception is the thick-walled, polaridiblastic spores of the lichen families Physciaceae and Teloschistaceae, whose shared structure reflects true evolutionary kinship.

The oldest unambiguous ascospore fossils occur in the Early Devonian-era Rhynie chert, where preserved perithecia contain asci filled with lens-shaped spores. Molecular clock studies, using these and a few Carboniferous fossils for calibration, estimate that ascospory arose in the late Neoproterozoic to Cambrian. No unambiguous fossils are known from before the Devonian.

== Development and cytology ==
=== Ascus types and arrangement ===
In Ascomycota, asci develop inside several main types of multicellular fruiting body. The common types (cleistothecia, perithecia, apothecia and pseudothecia) house asci in different ways. Apothecia are open cup- or disc-shaped fruit bodies where the spore-bearing layer (the hymenium) is exposed. Perithecia are enclosed, flask-shaped structures that discharge ascospores through a small opening at the top, known as an ostiole. Cleistothecia stay entirely sealed until their walls break open or decay. Pseudothecia (also called ascostromata) contain asci embedded in chambers (locules) that form within a dense fungal tissue (a stroma). A fifth arrangement occurs in some early-diverging groups like Taphrinomycetes and in some yeasts: asci form directly on fungal filaments (hyphae), without a distinct fruiting body.

Each ascus structure supports a different ecological strategy. The apothecia of cup fungi (e.g. Sarcoscypha, Cladonia) provide a broad, exposed surface that allows wind to carry off the forcibly ejected spores. Perithecia and pseudothecia, common in wood- and leaf-inhabiting fungi, protect the asci until pressure builds and shoots the spores through the narrow ostiole—an effective way to escape crowded or enclosed surfaces. Cleistothecia, which are found in powdery mildews and underground truffles, shield their asci from drying out and from UV damage, but they rely on external forces like weathering or animals to break open and release their spores. Species with naked asci, such as some yeasts and the leaf parasite Taphrina, skip fruit body formation entirely. Their spores are released on site and spread by rain, insects, or direct contact.

=== Ascus development ===
In most filamentous ascomycetes, sexual development begins when two compatible cells fuse their cytoplasm, a process called plasmogamy, forming a filament (hypha) in which each cell contains a pair of nuclei (a dikaryon). Near the growing tip, a hook-shaped cell called a crozier develops and helps organize these nuclei so they divide and fuse in the correct sequence. Sexual development is often triggered when key nutrients such as carbon or nitrogen become limiting; by contrast, high levels of glucose or ammonium suppress it. The ascus mother cell, where spores form, is the only briefly diploid stage in the life cycle. In some species, environmental cues also shape development: blue light can guide the direction in which the fruit body grows.

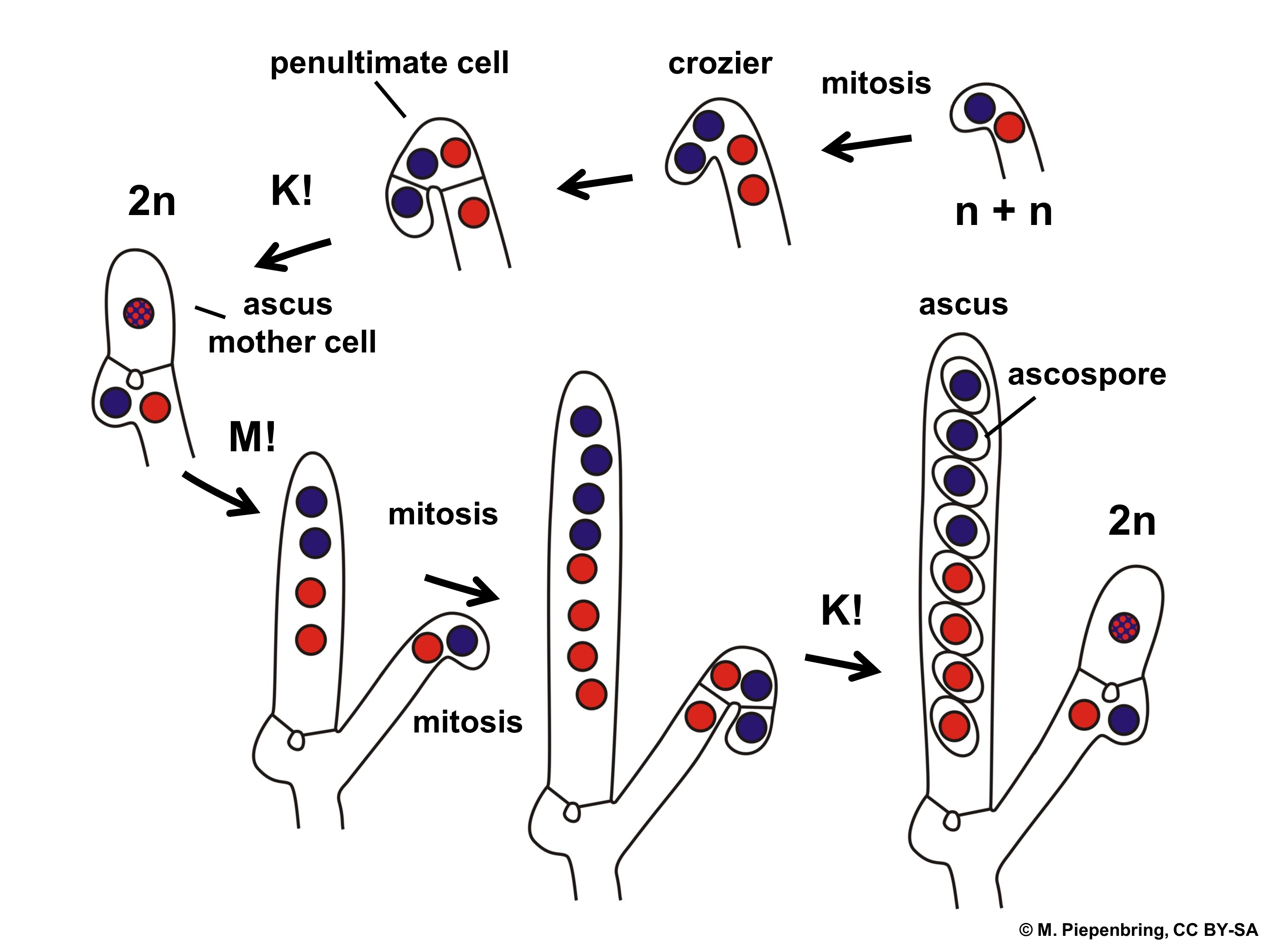
Crozier cycle in filamentous Ascomycota: a hook-shaped crozier (top right) establishes a dikaryon (n + n). The penultimate cell becomes the ascus mother, undergoes karyogamy (K!), meiosis (M!) and one mitosis, then walls off eight haploid ascospores. Basal cells regain the dikaryon for another round.

After the crozier sets up the ascus mother cell and the paired nuclei fuse (karyogamy), the ascus begins dividing its cytoplasm into spore compartments. A delimiting double membrane forms around each future spore; electron microscopy of Lophodermella sulcigena suggests this membrane is continuous with the ascus cell membrane rather than derived from the nuclear envelope. This compartmentalisation is described in specialist terms as euascus or hemiascus development, depending on how the membranes form. In some fungi, all eight spores are first enclosed together in a shared membrane tube that later divides; in others, each spore is wrapped separately from the beginning. Both strategies produce eight membrane-bounded compartments ready for wall building. In some groups, leftover ascus cytoplasm (epiplasm) collects as a lens-shaped pocket near the ascus tip, the ocular chamber (or oculus); in those taxa, the size of this pocket and related tip structures can help identify genera.

After karyogamy, the resulting diploid nucleus undergoes meiosis to produce four haploid nuclei. An additional mitotic division usually follows, yielding eight nuclei—four pairs of genetically identical "twins". These sister nuclei form adjacent spores, a feature exploited in classical genetics experiments like Neurospora tetrad analysis. Each nucleus is packaged into an "ascospore initial": a small, membrane-bounded bubble of cytoplasm whose membranes are collectively called the enveloping-membrane system (EMS). The EMS usually derives from the ascus plasma membrane, although in some yeasts it originates from the nuclear membrane. As wall material is laid down, the inner membrane becomes the ascospore’s own cell membrane, while the outer membrane remains outside the spore and helps anchor early wall layers. In most budding yeasts (Saccharomycetales) the EMS can enclose all nuclei in a single vesicle that later subdivides; in filamentous ascomycetes, spore membranes typically form separately from the outset. In some fungi, the developing ascospore forms internal cross-walls and becomes multicellular; additional mitoses place a nucleus in each compartment, so the cells share the same genome. In the lichen Trypetheliaceae, each ascospore starts by forming a single true cross-wall (euseptum); additional cross-walls (distosepta) grow outward from the centre, with temporary wall thickenings that are ultimately resorbed.

=== Wall maturation and chemistry ===
Developing ascospores build thick, durable cell walls that differ significantly from the walls of ordinary fungal hyphae. These walls are usually multi-layered. The inner layers contain glucans and other polysaccharides, similar to typical fungal cells, while the outer layers are specialized for durability. In baker's yeast (Saccharomyces cerevisiae), for example, the spore wall includes a chitosan-rich layer and a tough outer coat made of cross-linked dityrosine, an amino acid polymer. This structure gives the spores exceptional resistance to heat, drying, and enzymes that would normally break down cells. Leftover ascus cytoplasm (epiplasm) can also contribute materials that shape surface ornamentation, such as ridges or spines, on the outer wall of ornamented ascospores. In yeasts, the original cell transforms into an ascus containing four spores. In filamentous fungi, by contrast, the ascus is a new, specialized cell that typically holds eight spores. Despite these differences, the underlying cytology – karyogamy followed by meiotic sporogenesis within a single mother cell – is shared. By the time an ascus is ready to discharge its spores, each ascospore is a discrete, walled cell harbouring a haploid nucleus (or nuclei) and any preparatory food reserves. The ascus may then rupture or develop a pore through which the ascospores exit, leaving behind only empty ascus husks.

Overall, the ascospore wall is built in layers, with inner layers that resemble ordinary fungal cell walls and outer layers specialized for protection. Its innermost layers resemble the standard fungal cell wall, while its outer layers are unique to the spore stage. The inner wall is built from a framework of β-glucan woven with chitin, laid down as soon as the young spore is sealed off from the surrounding ascus.

Chitin (left) is a linear polymer of N-acetylglucosamine; enzymatic removal of the acetyl groups (deacetylation by the enzyme chitin deacetylase) converts it into chitosan (right), introducing free amine groups that give the ascospore wall a positively charged, stress-resistant layer.

In many species, the chitin is quickly chemically modified (deacetylated) into chitosan. In Saccharomyces cerevisiae, enzymes convert much of the initial chitin framework into chitosan, creating a base layer that anchors later wall layers. Filamentous ascomycetes follow a similar process, though their chitosan layer is thinner and often contains β-1,6-glucan. Many lichen fungi and Taphrina species add a second layer rich in mannoproteins or galactomannans—sugar-containing proteins that add further strength or function. In many soil saprobes a lipid-rich middle layer adds further protection against drying.

Outside these carbohydrate-rich layers, different fungal groups add extra protective materials. In some species, a tough dityrosine polymer, built in the ascus cytoplasm and transported outward, forms a UV-blocking, waterproof outer coat. In contrast, many Dothideomycetes and Xylariales embed melanin-like pigments into the wall, giving rise to the dark brown or black spores familiar to field mycologists. Another approach is to build outer walls from tough polyaromatic compounds like sporopollenin, a material known for its extreme chemical resistance. Chemical studies of yeast spores have also identified an unknown component, tentatively called the "Chi polymer", which lies between the chitosan and dityrosine layers. In Aspergillus nidulans, the red anthraquinone pigment asperthecin is built into the ascospore wall. Mutants that lack the pigment form hyaline, misshapen spores that are about 100-fold more sensitive to UVC light, showing a protective role for wall-bound pigments. Finally, decorative surface features are laid on top of these protective layers. These include spines, ridges, or hydrophobin rodlets that often require electron microscopy to see. The proteins that sculpt these structures can be used to help identify species, for instance, the distinctive rodlet proteins of Chaetomium and Talaromyces.

These biochemical differences among Ascomycota are reflected in their survival strategies. Lichen-forming fungi often produce outer walls coated in galactose-rich polysaccharides. These swell into mucilage when wet, aiding both water retention and attachment to surfaces. These chemical modifications explain why ascospore walls differ so much in permeability, staining behaviour, trace metal binding, and ecological function, allowing some spores to survive intense UV light high in the upper atmosphere, while others pass unharmed through the digestive tracts of animals like truffle-eating mammals.

== Morphology and ornamentation ==
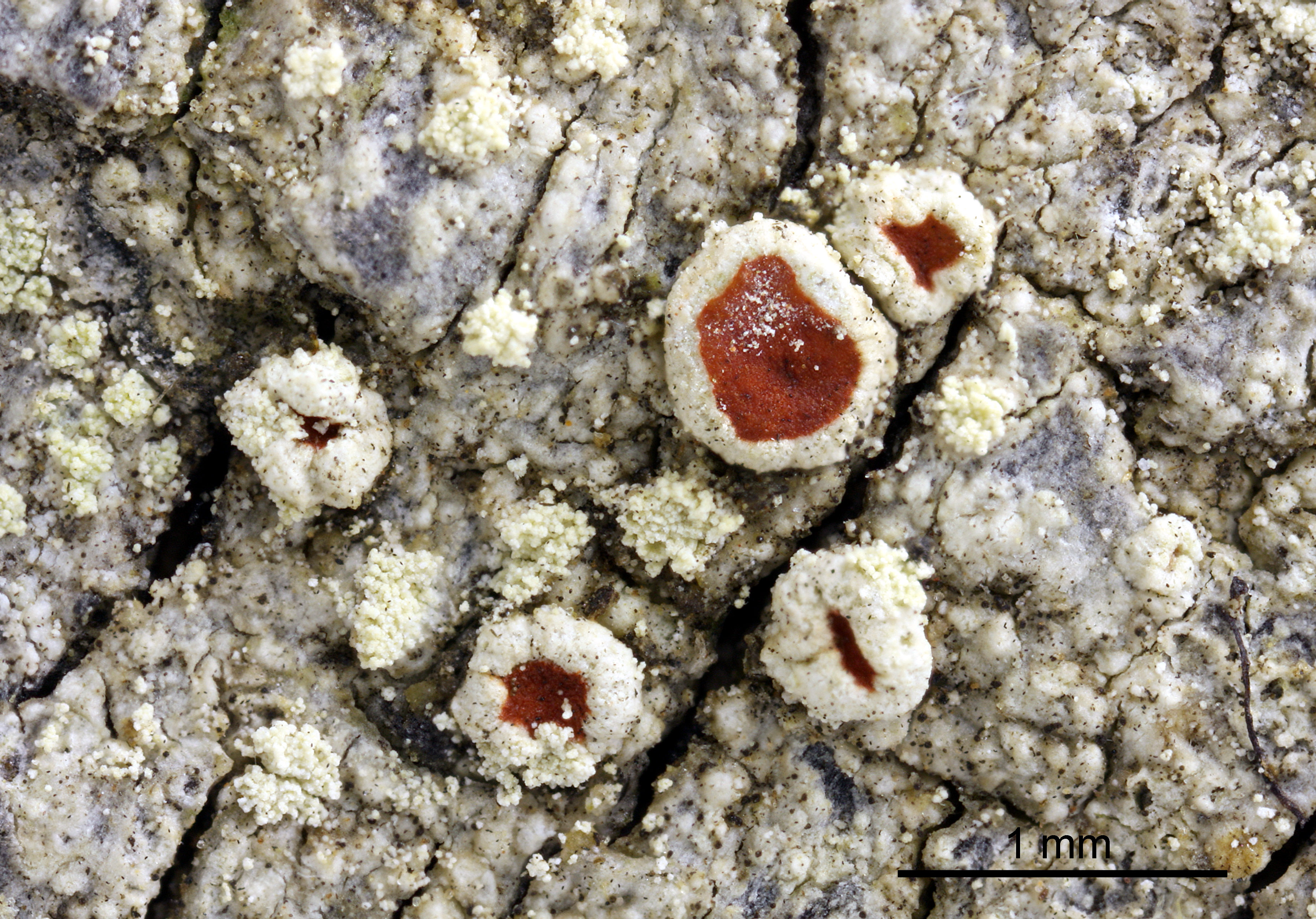
Fruit bodies (apothecia) of the crustose lichen genus Haematomma (H. sorediatum pictured) contain a crimson pigment thought to protect its characteristic spindle-shaped, multiseptate ascospores (single spore pictured below) from ultraviolet radiation.

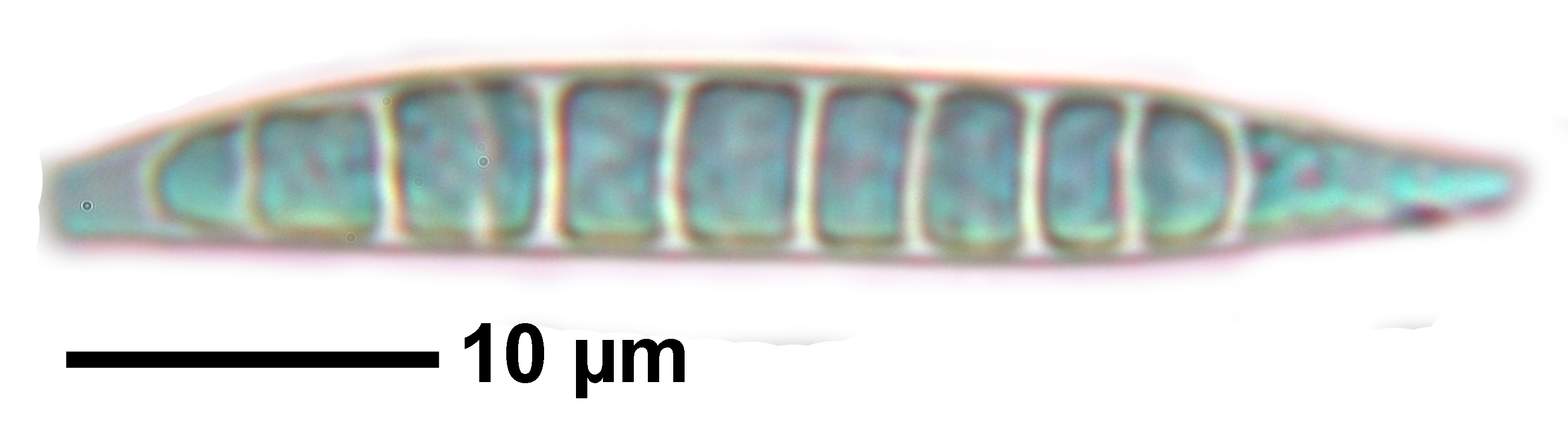

Ascospores vary widely in form, and these differences are widely used in fungal identification and classification. Their shapes range from spherical (globose) to ellipsoid, cylindrical, needle-like, and even spiral or helical forms. Most mature ascospores are single-celled (non-septate), though many species produce spores with one or more internal divisions. Immature spores are often colourless and translucent (hyaline). Many darken as they mature, gaining yellow, brown, olive, or black pigmentation often through melanin deposition, which helps shield the spore from ultraviolet radiation and environmental stress.

Spore walls are often multi-layered, with thickness and texture differing among species. Some ascospores are smooth and almost glassy-like, appearing highly refractive under the microscope, whereas others are covered in surface ornamentation. Under light microscopy or scanning electron microscopy, ascospores may show an array of ornamentation. For example, spores of Tuber truffles bear dense spines or a net-like (reticulate) surface pattern. Other spores may display ridges, warts, spiral grooves, or carry gelatinous sheaths and threadlike appendages. Some ascospores have a gelatinous outer envelope (a perispore, sometimes called a "halo"). Spores with this envelope are described as halonate. In addition to shape and colour, these features of the spore wall are often critical for species identification. Diagnostic traits may also include the number of wall layers, presence of mucilage, reaction to iodine stains (amyloid or not), and the presence of internal oil droplets (guttules).

These morphological traits remain essential for taxonomy and species recognition. Traditional fungal identification keys often begin with ascospore features such as size, shape, septation, and colour. For example, the lichen family Sagiolechiaceae is partly defined by its colourless spores, which are transversely septate or muriform—divided into a grid by both transverse and longitudinal walls. The number of internal cells can also distinguish genera: many lichen-forming ascomycetes have multicellular (septate) spores, while yeasts like Saccharomyces produce simple, single-celled oval ascospores.

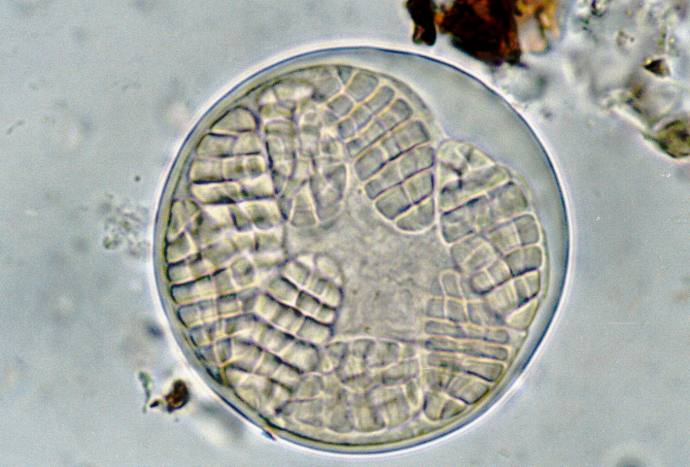
Arthothelium spectabile ascus (×1000, differential-interference contrast); a balloon-shaped ascus encloses eight hyaline, muriform ascospores with clearly visible multiple transverse and longitudinal septa.

Ascospore shapes range from simple spheres and ovals to more elaborate forms—such as elongated, hat-shaped (galeate), or constricted (isthmoid) types. Spore size is also variable; most fall between 5–50 micrometres (one thousandth of a millimetre, abbreviated μm) in length, though extremes reaching over 200 μm long and 75 μm wide are known. Some lichen-forming fungi greatly exceed typical size ranges. For example, Ocellularia subpraestans routinely produces ascospores 750 × 50 μm and exceptionally up to 880 × 65 μm—the longest yet recorded for any fungus. The largest measured spore volume belongs to Lepra melanochlora (300 × 200 μm, equivalent to 0.05 cubic millimetres). The ascospore wall is often a complex, multilayered structure that can be smooth or exhibit various ornamentations. These may include surface patterns, such as the rodlet patterning found in some Chaetomium species, or distinct structures like appendages. In marine fungi such as Halosphaeria and Lulworthia, spores are encased in gelatinous sheaths or caps that swell into threadlike appendages when wet. These structures enlarge surface area to slow sinking and later act as sticky anchors, attaching the spore to submerged wood or seagrass. The morphological diversity of ascospores reflects adaptations to various ecological niches and dispersal strategies, and often provides important taxonomic characteristics for fungal classification. Some species even produce spores of different sizes or colours within a single ascus. For example, Podospora arizonensis produces both large, pigmented spores and small, hyaline spores within the same ascus. This dimorphism may serve as a bet-hedging strategy, allowing the fungus to exploit different ecological opportunities.

Even missing traits can be diagnostic; for example, Taphrina ascospores lack true walls and bud like yeast cells. Microscopic techniques such as phase-contrast or differential interference contrast microscopy help reveal these details of ascospore ornamentation and septation. In practice, mycologists often stain spores with dyes to make walls and septa easier to see. Lactofuchsin or cotton blue are used to observe shape and internal septa, a drop of iodine (Melzer's reagent) is used for any amyloid blueing reaction and to note surface ornamentation at high magnification. These features, often preserved even in dried herbarium specimens, have long been central to defining ascomycete taxa. Modern approaches, including electron microscopy, have supplemented these criteria with ultrastructural characters (such as wall layering patterns), but classical ascospore morphology remains one of the most reliable tools for identifying and classifying Ascomycota.

== Discharge and dispersal mechanics ==
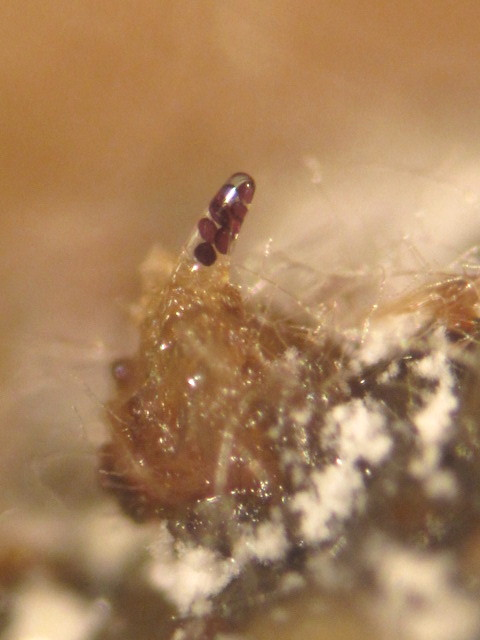
Ascus of Ascobolus immersus (on goat dung) poised to eject eight wine-red ascospores.

Asci shed their spores in two contrasting ways. In prototunicate (thin-walled) asci, common in many lichens and yeasts, the ascus wall often dissolves or ruptures once spores are mature. Self-digesting (autolytic) enzymes dissolve the ascus wall, and relative humidity affects when this begins. Because each ascus collapses on its own schedule, thalli such as Chaenotheca chrysocephala drip spores into the air for days, extending the window for interception by wind or rain splash. Aquatic relatives adapt the same principle for flotation: Halosarpheia and Torpedospora grow thread-like sails or parachutes that keep the newly freed spores suspended, while arenicolous (beach-dwelling) Corollospora spores collect in sea foam before sticking to fresh strand lines.

Fungi with unitunicate or bitunicate asci do the opposite: the ascus builds pressure and launches spores forcibly. During the final seconds before firing the cell imbibes water, stretches up to four times its resting length and reaches about 0.3 MPa (megapascals) of turgor, fuelled by polyols such as glycerol or mannitol. When the ascus tip opens, through an operculum, an amyloid ring, or a pore, spores shoot out at 20–30 m/s (66–98 ft/s) with accelerations that top 10,000 g and finish in under a millisecond. Hundreds of asci in a single perithecium can fire almost together after a humidity dip; their combined jet of moist air lifts later-firing spores clear of the still-air boundary layer. In the bright-orange cup fungus Cookeina sulcipes roughly 1.7 million spores erupt from every square centimetre of hymenial surface in a single "puff".

Ballistic launch is tuned just to clear near-field obstacles—up to 6 cm (2.4 in) in crustose lichens and about 30 cm (12 in) in dung fungi such as Ascobolus. Bitunicate asci often travel farther because the elastic inner wall balloons through the rigid exotunica before tearing. Once aloft, range depends on spore mass, ornamentation and any gelatinous sheath: needle-shaped spores of Sordaria slip through the air more efficiently than globose, mucilage-coated spores. Perithecia of Cyphelium inquinans need gusts above 5 m/s (16 ft/s) to detach their spores, whereas strong polar winds can loft discharged spores kilometres down-range.

Forcibly ejected ascospores make up a conspicuous share of airborne biological particles in the 2–20 μm size range over cropland and woodland canopies, especially during calm, humid nights. Their hydrophilic (water-attracting) multilayered walls can make them efficient cloud condensation nuclei, and melanised varieties nucleate ice at temperatures as warm as −5 °C (23 °F). Current aerosol-climate models assign 5–20 % of all ice-nucleating particles active at 0 °C (32 °F) to fungal spores, most of them ascomycetous.

== Germination biology ==
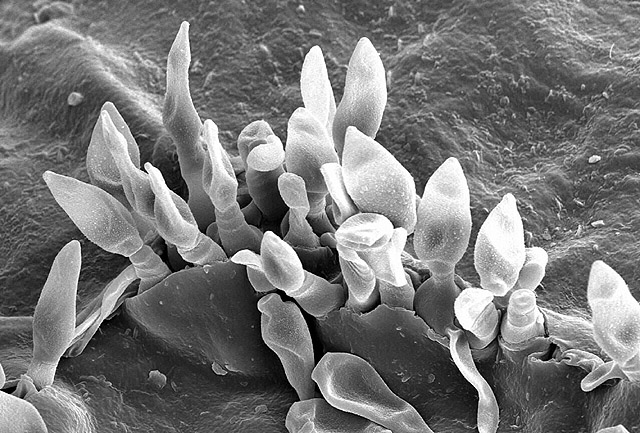
Venturia inaequalis ascospores germinating through a crab-apple leaf cuticle (×1500)

After discharge, many ascospores do not germinate immediately. Some pass through a brief after-ripening period, while others enter longer dormancy whose length and triggers vary widely. Some lichens (Chaenotheca, Cladonia) shed spores that germinate within hours on a damp surface, oversized muriform spores of Ocellularia subpraestans start within minutes of release, whereas other taxa remain inert for months until seasonal cues arrive. Field trials show that crustose tropical lichens achieve the highest germination percentages, whereas foliose (leafy) forms often germinate poorly even when they discharge readily. In temperate pathogens such as apple scab (Venturia inaequalis) a winter-long chill followed by spring rain ends dormancy and synchronises infection of young leaves. Many spores stockpile trehalose, trehalose-based oligosaccharides and lipids. Their cytoplasm can vitrify (become glass-like) during dry storage (the glass relaxes within minutes once water re-enters) and can stay viable for up to nine years in dry storage.

Some fungi impose specialized activation barriers. Fire-followers such as Neurospora crassa germinate only after a brief 60 °C (140 °F) heat shock that mimics passing flames, while soil moulds Talaromyces and Neosartorya withstand pasteurization-level heat (ascospores of Talaromyces macrosporus survive 100 minutes at 85 °C (185 °F)) and germinate once competitors are killed. High-pressure processing (600 MPa, 70 °C) likewise activates a fraction of these spores; survivors germinate synchronously. Other species wait for chemical or mechanical signals: the volatile substance 1-octen-3-ol released by packed spores inhibits germination until air flow disperses it, and thick-walled truffle spores may need abrasion or passage through an animal gut before growth can begin.

Once the spore rehydrates, germination can proceed quickly. Trehalose, its oligosaccharide derivatives and mannitol dissolve, lowering cytoplasmic viscosity and fuelling the first ATP burst; the spore swells as the wall softens, then a germ pore or slit opens and a germ tube emerges. Growth patterns differ: tropical lichens show random, bipolar or segmental tube formation; heat-activated Neurospora spores shoot a short tube, pause, then resume hyphal extension; yeasts such as Dipodascus and Taphrina may bud secondary propagules directly from the primary ascospore. Under favourable conditions a visible mycelium can arise within one or two days.

== Role in fungal life cycles ==
The ascospore is more than a reproductive cell: it is a compact seed-like stage that packages a recombined haploid genome, protective wall layers, and energy reserves in a form built to travel and to wait. Meiosis inside the ascus shuffles parental chromosomes, so every spore leaves the fruit-body with a unique genotype, giving populations the raw material for adaptation whenever those spores outcross with compatible partners. Because the spore is often the only structure that can detach from the feeding mycelium and survive environmental stress, its formation marks the real start of the next fungal generation.

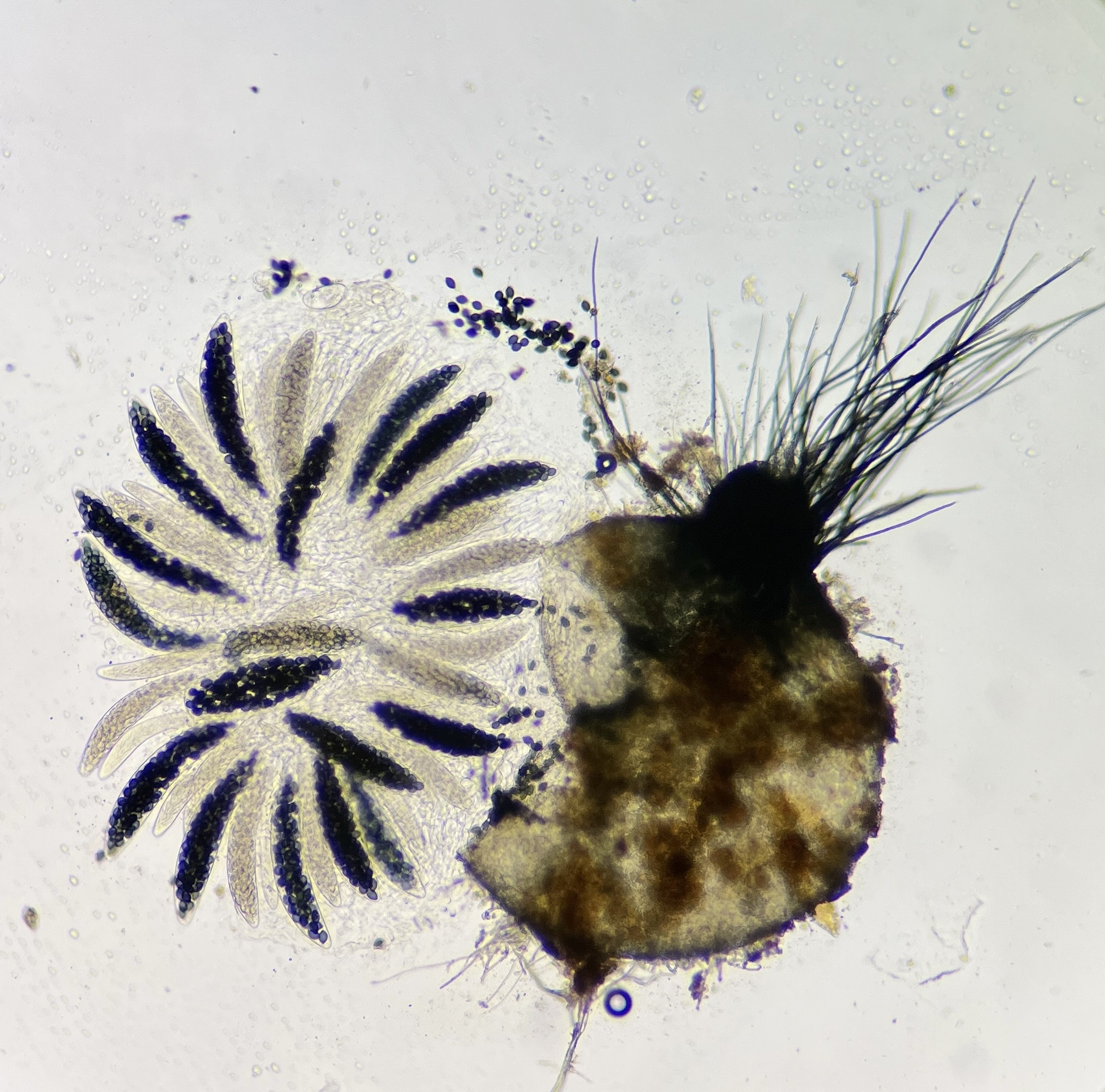
Triangularia setosa perithecium with mature, dark ascospores in radiating asci (phase-contrast)

Mobility takes several forms. Many filamentous ascomycetes hurl spores clear of the substrate; dung dwellers such as Podospora and Triangularia regularly shoot them tens of centimetres beyond the manure pile so grazing animals carry the fungus farther. Subterranean truffles invert the strategy: their fragrant ascocarps entice mammals whose chewing ruptures the asci, and the thick-walled spores pass intact through the gut to be deposited in new territory. On bare rock faces lichens release showers of minute, colourless spores; sheer numbers can compensate for the added requirement that the fungus must meet a suitable photobiont before a new thallus can form.

Dormancy allows the same spores to bridge seasons or catastrophes. In apple orchards, Venturia inaequalis survives winter as asci on fallen leaves and launches spores with the first spring rain, providing the primary inoculum of each epidemic. Fire-adapted moulds such as Neurospora keep a soil seed-bank of heat-resistant spores that germinate en masse after a burn and rapidly colonize the charred wood. Light, melanised spores of saprobes like Chaetomium and Xylaria tolerate high-altitude transport; atmospheric surveys recover them thousands of kilometres from land, showing how they seed distant ecosystems, making fungal communities more similar across regions on a continental scale.

=== Soil and sediment spore banks ===
Long-lived spore banks parallel the seed banks of plants: vast reserves of dormant ascospores accumulate in substrates and germinate only when conditions turn favourable. In calcareous truffle orchards, for example, systematic post-season digs show that roughly 30–40 % of black truffle (Tuber melanosporum) ascocarps remain undetected by foragers or animals; their thick-walled spores persist in the upper 10 cm (4 in) of soil and form a standing inoculum that can span multiple years. Similar long-term reservoirs occur in aquatic settings: metabarcoding of a 10,500-year-old sediment core from Lake Lielais Svētiņu (Latvia) recovered diverse Ascomycota ITS sequences, including coprophilous and saprotrophic taxa. This shows that ascospores can enter lake sediments and can survive burial over millennial timescales before re-entry into the water column by mixing.

== Diversity across Ascomycota ==
Taphrina's ascus produces eight primary ascospores that then bud internally an exception to the usual fixed spore count.

Ascomycota, the largest fungal division, shows wide latitude in how many spores a single ascus produces. Eight spores remains the default (one meiosis followed by one mitosis). Saccharomycete yeasts often stop at four, while filamentous genera such as Gymnoascus and Basipetospora add further post-meiotic divisions to yield 16, 32 or more propagules. Some powdery mildews (Erysiphe) and most Laboulbeniales mature only two spores, and a few taxa, including Monosporascus and Cephalotheca, make just one. At the opposite extreme, repeated budding inside the ascus can fill Taphrina asci with dozens of secondary spores, and individual asci of Ascodesmis can shelter several thousand minute propagules. Other outliers depart even further from the textbook pattern: the cucurbit pathogen Monosporascus cannonballus matures a single globose ascospore per ascus, whereas in forest-pathogenic Tympanis species each primary ascospore buds internally to fill the ascus with hundreds of conidium-like propagules before dehiscence. Cordyceps takes a different route: each of its eight primary, filiform spores fragments into roughly 100 parts, so a single stroma carrying roughly 800 perithecia may disseminate more than 60 million infectious units—an output that compensates for scarce insect hosts.

Size, septation and wall architecture broaden that diversity still further. Yeasts such as Eremothecium release spheroidal spores barely 1 μm across, whereas certain Neurospora relatives exceed 200 μm. The ancestral state is aseptate and persists in Eurotiomycetes (e.g. Aspergillus, Penicillium), but many Dothideomycetes and lichen-forming Lecanoromycetes insert one or many cross-walls. Some Graphis species discharge long, multiseptate needles, whereas Diploschistes and related genera form muriform spores partitioned in both directions; these dark "megalospores", often more than 400 × 50 μm, have evolved independently in several families and are thought to strengthen the wall while compartmentalising nutrients. In many Pleosporales the two cells of a thick-septate, brown spore are unequal, with a swollen distal cell and a smaller, darker basal cell.

Some fungi also reduce spore number through programmed spore loss. In Coniochaeta tetraspora half the eight spores self-destruct, leaving a fertile four-spored ascus, while "spore-killer" drive elements in Podospora, Neurospora and other genera bias survival so only spores carrying a "spore-killer" allele remain, reshaping population genetics and hastening reproductive isolation. Life-style correlates reinforce these trends: cup fungi (Pezizomycetes) such as morels possess large, operculate asci that shoot eight hyaline spores into the air, whereas truffles develop ornamented but non-discharged spores that rely on mammals for dispersal; tiny Laboulbeniomycetes streamline the ascus to four elongate cells that cling readily to insect cuticle.

Across these extremes, from one spore to a thousand and from aseptate spheres to multicellular giants, ascospore traits remain indispensable to systematics. Counts, dimensions, septation and wall sculpturing are routinely coded as morphological characters in phylogenetic matrices, anchoring DNA-based trees to observable features.

== Methods of study ==
Microscopists often begin by mounting spores in water or lactic acid to measure spore size, septation and ornamentation. A few classic stains often suffice for routine work. For example, cotton blue or calcofluor-white for wall polysaccharides, and a drop of Melzer's reagent to test for an amyloid reaction. Beyond that, most ascospores can be identified by shape and iodine response alone, so exhaustive staining protocols are rarely needed.

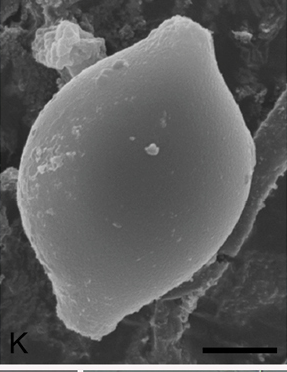
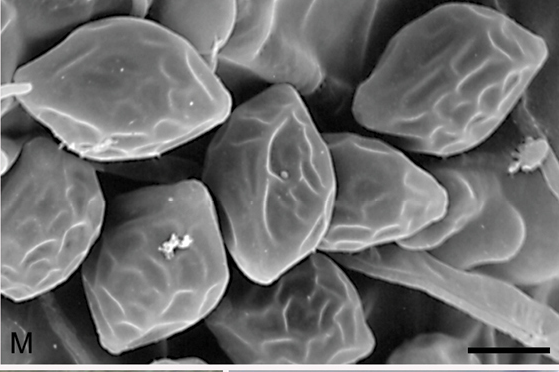
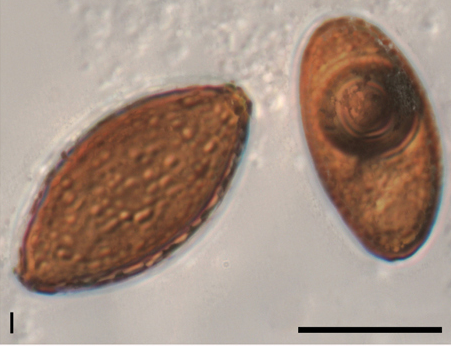
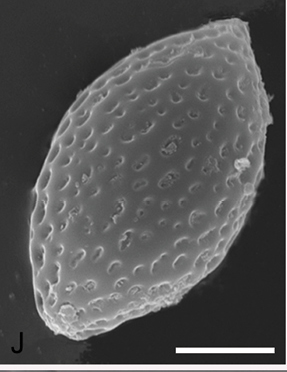
Scanning electron microscope and light microscope views of ascospore surface patterns in three Microthecium species (clockwise from upper left): : M. levitum smooth (2.5 μm scale); M. fimicola wrinkled; M. japonicum pitted (5 μm); final panel, M. japonicum in bright-field (10 μm).

Wall ultrastructure is resolved by electron microscopy. Transmission electron microscopy of frozen or resin-embedded sections shows the multi-layered wall forming between the paired delimiting membranes, while scanning electron microscopy reveals surface sculpture (spines on Tuber spores, rodlets on Chaetomium) that is diagnostic at generic or even species rank.

For genetic and physiological studies, researchers isolate single spores with a glass needle or a micro-manipulator and germinate them in pure culture—a method perfected on Neurospora and Saccharomyces. In yeasts, the four spores from a single ascus (an "ordered tetrad") can be used to track how alleles sort during meiosis, allowing genes to be mapped to centimorgan precision and enabling the construction of custom hybrids for brewing or biotechnology. Genomics rounds out the toolkit. RNA-Seq (RNA sequencing) time courses track thousands of transcripts as spores progress through meiosis, wall formation and dormancy; CRISPR/Cas9 knock-outs (targeted gene deletions) can then test whether specific genes are required for stress resistance or heat-triggered germination. Comparative surveys show that the core Chs3–Cda pathway (which builds the chitin–chitosan wall layer) and dityrosine synthetase genes are ubiquitous in Ascomycota yet absent from plants and animals, making them promising targets for antifungal drugs.

Spore discharge has attracted modern biophysics. High-speed videography (more than 10,000 frames per second) can capture the sub-millisecond launch of unitunicate and bitunicate asci, allowing calculation of initial velocity, turgor and energy storage. Coupled with deletion mutants that alter osmolyte synthesis, these films have linked glycerol accumulation to firing force in Gibberella zeae and pinpointed a latch-mediated spring mechanism in dung fungi. Fluorescence and confocal microscopy bridge structure and genetics. In the budding yeast, green fluorescent protein tags on Chs3, Cda1 and Dit1 show where the chitin-to-chitosan layer and the dityrosine coat assemble; spores lacking these proteins fluoresce uniformly, confirming wall permeability defects. Similar tagging in Fusarium and Neurospora is uncovering conserved sporulation gene networks across the division.

Quantifying airborne inoculum often relies on volumetric samplers such as Burkard spore traps, which draw a constant stream of air over a greased slide. Pathologists stain the daily tape with trypan blue and count the captured ascospores to forecast outbreaks of apple scab, sclerotinia stem rot and other diseases. Machine learning models fed with these counts, plus weather data, now outperform simple degree-day rules of thumb. High-throughput metabarcoding of airborne or soil DNA now complements spore-trap counts, detecting cryptic ascomycetes that never fruit in culture.

== Applied significance ==
=== Food spoilage and shelf-stable products ===
Heat-resistant ascospores from a small set of filamentous ascomycetes are the chief spoilage hazard in high-acid, shelf-stable drinks and purées. Heat-resistance trials (often reported as D-values) rank these ascospores in three tiers: Talaromyces macrosporus, Paecilomyces variotii (teleomorph=Byssochlamys spectabilis) and neosartorya-type Aspergillus strains survive ≥10 minutes at 90 °C (194 °F); a middle group—including Paecilomyces niveus, Monascus ruber and allied Talaromyces—tolerates 80 to 85 °C (176 to 185 °F) pasteurization for several minutes; yeast spores of Saccharomyces cerevisiae and xerophilic A. glaucus are killed below 75 °C (167 °F). These spores are naturally dormant: their cytoplasm vitrifies into a glass-like matrix supported by greater than 1 molar trehalose and mannitol, halting metabolism and rendering them impervious even in nutrient-rich media.

The toughest taxa rival bacterial endospores: T. macrosporus and the thermophile Thermoascus crustaceus top published D-values, while P. variotii owes its hardiness to an ascospore stage that remains dormant until extreme stimuli both activate and fail to inactivate it, causing "late" spoilage weeks after packaging. Once activated, the compatible solutes efflux, viscosity collapses and germ-tube growth resumes. High intracellular trehalose and mannitol (greater than 1 molar) can vitrify the cytoplasm; upon activation these solutes efflux, viscosity drops and germ-tube growth resumes. Ongoing nomenclatural reform now lists Paecilomyces variotii rather than Byssochlamys on hazard registers, though the older name persists in some industry guides.

=== Biotechnology and fermentation ===
Brewers, cheesemakers and enzyme producers exploit ascospore biology in two ways. Sporulation lets geneticists dissect tetrads (the spores produced together in one ascus) of Saccharomyces cerevisiae or cross teleomorphs of Aspergillus, rapidly breeding hybrids with new flavour profiles or stress tolerances. Sexual cycles also underpin diversity in traditional processes: the koji mould Aspergillus oryzae and the blue-cheese fungi Penicillium roqueforti and P. camemberti retain meiotic stages that refresh strain pools used commercially.

Industry can store ("bank") hardy ascospores because their multi-layered walls tolerate desiccation, freezing and long storage; dried spore lots of Talaromyces or Aspergillus remain viable for years, giving manufacturers stable inoculum on demand.

=== Plant pathology and disease forecasting ===
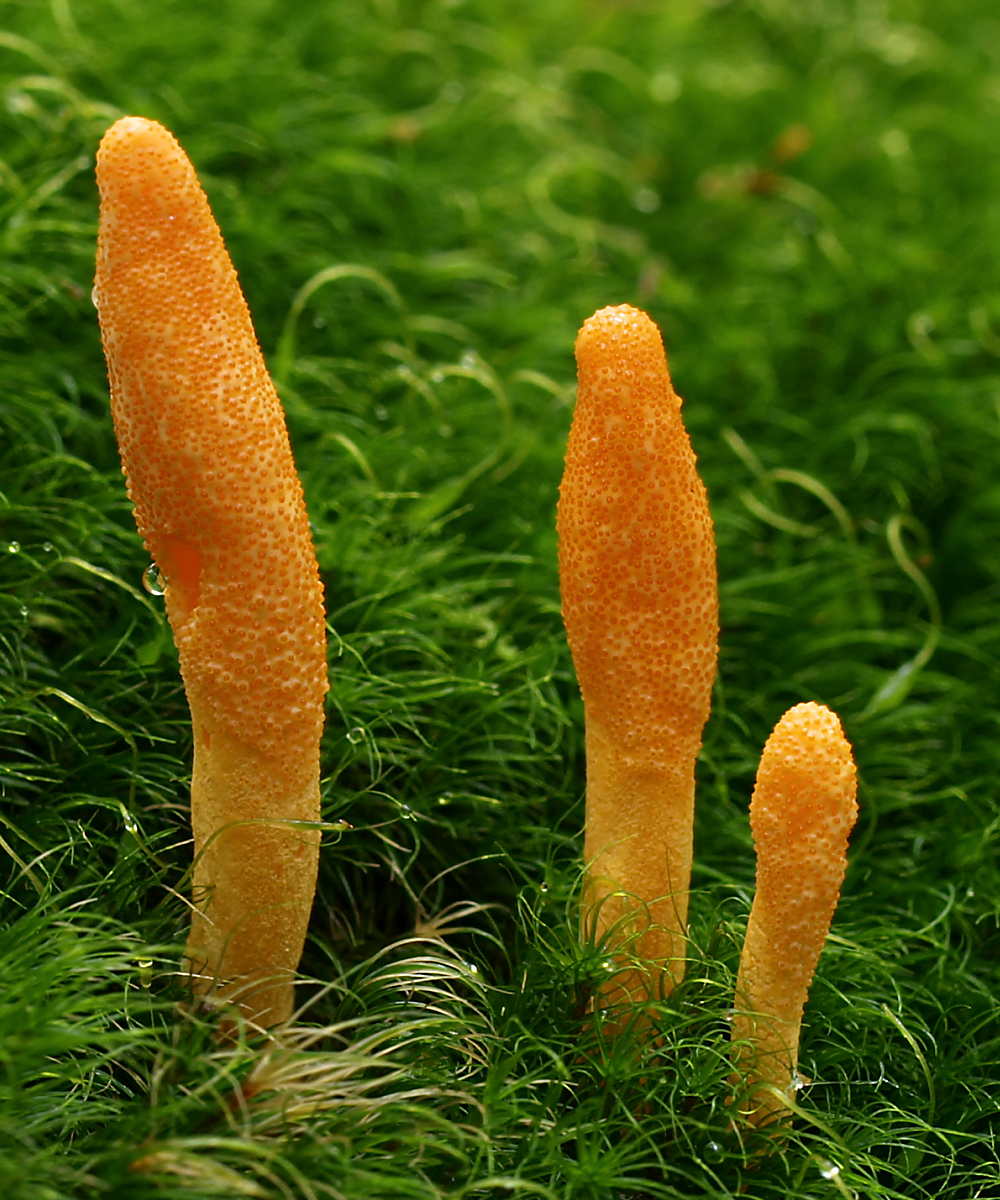
Bright orange stromata of the insect-parasitic fungus Cordyceps militaris; each club is studded with hundreds of perithecia whose eight filiform ascospores fragment into about 100 part-spores before discharge.

Sexual spores initiate many crop epidemics. In cereals, perithecia of Gibberella zeae (teleomorph=Fusarium graminearum) release airborne ascospores that colonize wheat heads, while Venturia inaequalis ejects spring spores from leaf litter to start apple scab. As each ascospore derives from meiosis, annual inoculum can harbour fungicide-resistance or novel virulence alleles, complicating control programmes.

Modern forecasts often combine volumetric spore trap counts with weather data: in Canadian dry beans, qPCR counts of Sclerotinia sclerotiorum ascospores fed into random-forest models (a type of machine learning method) successfully flagged high-risk spray windows, though canopy turbulence still limits precision. Management aims to reduce the primary ascospore load through leaf shredding, crop rotation or burial of debris, while timing fungicides to peak release periods.

Ascospores also underpin biocontrol. Teleomorphs of commercial Trichoderma (Hypocrea) and the insect pathogen Cordyceps militaris rely on long-lived sexual spores for persistence in soil and litter, making knowledge of discharge and dormancy vital when formulating field applications.

=== Biomedical and public health relevance ===
Beyond agriculture and industry, ascospore processes influence human health. The ascospores of Aspergillus fumigatus (teleomorph=Neosartorya fumigata) can germinate in soil after surviving azole exposure, spreading resistance alleles that later appear in clinical isolates. Reviews of tropical aerobiology flag forcibly discharged ascospores as under-recognized aeroallergens: in a San Juan study, 94 % of patients with asthma or allergic rhinitis showed serum-IgE reactivity (an antibody response linked to allergy) to ascospore extracts, compared with 58 % reacting to common mitospore mixes. Because discharge peaks during humid nights and after rainfall, epidemiologists now recommend including ascospore counts in aeroallergen forecasts for tropical and subtropical cities.

== Research frontiers ==
Research on ascospores continues to evolve, intersecting with advances in genomics, climate science, and antifungal strategies. Outstanding priorities include linking traits to dispersal, building global aerobiological networks, tracing river- and ocean-borne spread, and gauging human-driven homogenization.

=== Ascospore-wall genetics and antifungal targets ===
One active frontier is unravelling the genetic and biochemical pathways of ascospore-wall biosynthesis, especially in the model yeast Saccharomyces cerevisiae. RNA-seq profiles taken across sporulation, followed by classical knock-outs or CRISPR/Cas9 editing, have identified more than fifty "sporulation genes", including the chitin-to-chitosan pathway and the DIT1/DIT2-dependent synthesis of the outer dityrosine coat. In wild-type cells a pair of chitin-deacetylase isozymes (Cda1, Cda2) convert the innermost chitin scaffold to chitosan; loss of both enzymes (cda1Δ cda2Δ, deletion mutants) yields spores with permeable, stress-sensitive walls. A second gene cluster (DIT1, DIT2, DTR1) polymerizes and exports dityrosine, sealing the wall; dit1Δ or dit2Δ mutants completely lack the outer coat and are hypersensitive to ether, heat shock and lytic enzymes.

Comparative genomics shows this core machinery is conserved in diverse filamentous ascomycetes and even in the basidiomycete Cryptococcus, pointing to an ancient origin. Because intact walls underpin long-term dormancy and extreme-stress survival, several enzymes in these pathways (e.g. chitin deacetylases, laccase-like oxidases) are now being evaluated as novel antifungal targets, and inhibitors of CDAs already suppress chitosan-rich spore formation in plant-pathogenic fungi. Better understanding of wall assembly can therefore support both a route to curb spore-borne pathogens and a blueprint for engineering stress-resistant cell types.

Comparative work in filamentous models such as Neurospora and Fusarium shows that the same Chs3–Cda chitin-to-chitosan pathway and Dit enzymes are conserved across Ascomycota, pointing to an ancient origin of the ascospore wall machinery. Because these wall-specific enzymes are absent from plants and animals yet indispensable for spore viability, several reviews highlight chitin deacetylases and dityrosine-forming oxidases as promising antifungal targets and as tools for engineering stress-resistant industrial strains.

=== Climate-driven shifts in dispersal ===
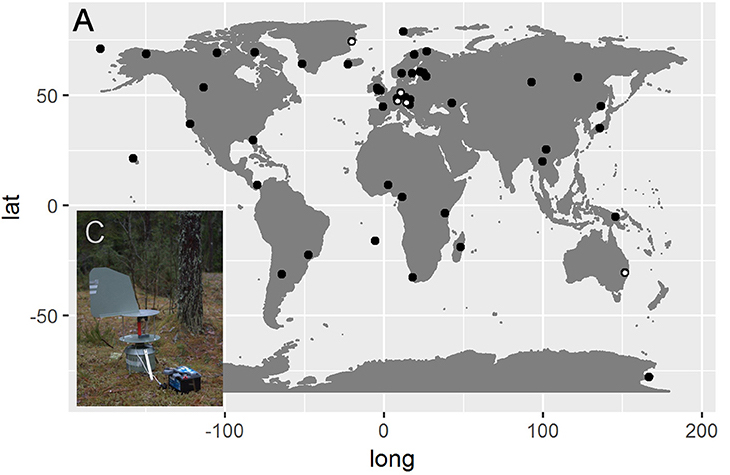
Global Spore Sampling Project: black dots mark dozens of active sampling sites (A); inset (C) shows the battery-powered cyclone sampler used at each location

One active area is how climate change affects ascospore dispersal and fungal life cycles. Because many Ascomycota time their ascospore release to seasonal cues (temperature, moisture), shifts in climate are altering these patterns. Long-term aerobiological studies have already documented changes: in some regions, peak ascospore release of plant pathogens is occurring earlier in the year and with greater intensity due to warming trends. For example, a multi-year study in Poland found that the first release of Leptosphaeria ascospores (canola pathogens) now occurs weeks earlier in warmer autumns than it did decades ago, effectively lengthening the infection season. In a 17-year aerobiological record from Poznań (1998–2014), mean July-to-November temperature rose by about 0.1 °C per year and rainfall by 6.3 mm per year; the first detection of L. maculans–L. biglobosa ascospores advanced from day 270 to 248 of the year (22 days), while the peak release shifted from day 315 to 265 (50 days), substantially extending the infection window.

Similarly, models predict that climate-driven changes in rainfall and wind could expand the range of fungi by carrying ascospores to new areas. Spore-trap networks and molecular detection (e.g. qPCR on air samples) are used to monitor dispersal in real time. Coupling these data with climate models helps forecast future disease pressure under different climate scenarios. There is also interest in how extreme weather events might trigger atypical ascospore releases – for instance, unusual out-of-season rains causing ascospore flushes. On the ecological side, research is examining fungal biogeography through ascospore dispersal. Genomic fingerprinting can sometimes identify identical genotypes across distant regions, implying that ascospores (or other spores) traveled the globe via air currents or migratory animals. Understanding ascospore dispersal capacity is key to predicting fungal responses to climate change, such as potential spread of new invasive fungal species or shifts in community composition in ecosystems (for example, changes in frequency of fire-adapted ascomycetes if wildfire regimes intensify). Long-term phenology datasets from Europe and North America record earlier, longer ascocarp seasons in warm years, advancing ascospore release by several weeks.

To test whether these regional trends scale worldwide, the Global Spore Sampling Project has deployed identical cyclone samplers on every continent, assembling a planet-wide baseline of aerial ascospore diversity and phenology for next-generation climate-dispersal models.

=== Antifungal resistance, biosecurity and biotech uses ===
In medical and biotechnology contexts, a continuing research focus is antifungal resistance. In the opportunistic pathogen Aspergillus fumigatus, sexual reproduction and the genetic recombination associated with it have been suggested to contribute to the emergence and spread of azole-resistance mutations (including tandem repeat mutations in the cyp51A gene). Environmental isolates of A. fumigatus have been found with combinations of azole-resistance mutations thought to arise from sexual recombination (crossing of strains) and spread by ascospores. Researchers are investigating whether limiting azole fungicide use in agriculture could reduce this selective pressure, and conversely, whether disrupting the sexual cycle of such molds (for instance by mutating mating genes) might curtail the appearance of new resistant strains.

In healthcare facilities, contamination risk is largely driven by the easy airborne dispersal of A. fumigatus small, hydrophobic asexual conidia, and infection is typically initiated by inhalation of airborne conidia. Accordingly, hospital prevention strategies focus on limiting aerosolization and spread of spores (e.g., air handling/filtration and dust control). Some studies have tested novel disinfection methods (like UV-C light or antifungal gases) specifically against hardy spores. Conversely, the durability of ascospores is being harnessed in biotechnology: labs are exploring ascospore encapsulation as a natural means to store and ship fungal cultures, essentially using the spore's own wall as a biocapsule. There is also interest in the developmental triggers that force a fungus into sexual reproduction. With many genomes of Ascomycota now sequenced, researchers can identify mating type genes and potentially induce fungi that are normally asexual in the lab to produce asci and ascospores. This could unlock the sexual stage (and thus genetic analysis) of important industrial fungi or pathogens where it was previously unknown.

=== Quantitative and imaging advances ===
Quantitative and imaging techniques have advanced ascospore research from descriptive morphology to precise biophysics. Food microbiology laboratories mathematically model how quickly spores die under heat rather than assuming a simple straight-line decline. At the ultrastructural end, rapidly freezing samples under pressure preserves their internal membranes better than chemical fixes. Video-enhanced differential-interference microscopy can be used to track spindle movements and membrane dynamics in vivo at sub-second resolution.

== See also ==
- Aeciospore
- Basidiospore
- Chlamydospore
- Pycniospore
- Teliospore
- Urediniospore
