= Pteridiosperma =

Scientific classification
- Kingdom: Fungi
- Division: Ascomycota
- Class: Sordariomycetes
- Order: Coronophorales
- Family: Ceratostomataceae
- Genus: Pteridiosperma; J.C. Krug & Jeng

Type species
- Pteridiosperma foveolatum (Udagawa & Y. Horie) J.C. Krug & Jeng

Species
- Pteridiosperma ciliatum Pteridiosperma foveolatum Pteridiosperma lenticulare

Genus of fungi

Pteridiosperma is a former genus of fungi within the Ceratostomataceae family.

All the species have been transferred to Microthecium Corda.
