= Carl Otto Harz =

German mycologist, pharmacist and botanist

Carl (or Karl) Otto Harz (28 November 1842 in Gammertingen – 5 December 1906 in Munich) was a German mycologist, pharmacist and botanist.

After spending time as an intern in several pharmacies, he studied botany at the University of Berlin. Later, he relocated to Munich, where he served as a lecturer at the Technical University of Munich (from 1873) and at the Tierärztliche Hochschule (from 1874). In 1880, he was appointed professor of botany and pharmacognosy at the Tierärztlichen Hochschule.

In 1877, with pathologist Otto Bollinger, he conducted early studies of actinomycosis in cattle, and is credited for naming the causal agent Actinomyces bovis. From his observations, he believed the culprit to be a mould, related to the genera Botrytis or Monosporium.

As a taxonomist, he circumscribed a number of varieties from the species Cucurbita pepo. His name is associated with the following mycological genera:

- Harzia (family Ceratostomataceae), named by Julien Noël Costantin (1888).
- Harziella (family Chaetomiaceae), named by Otto Kuntze (1891).

== Published works ==
- Beitrag zur Kenntniss des Polyporus Officinalis Fr, 1868 - Contribution to the understanding of Polyporus officinalis.
- Einige neue Hyphomyceten Berlins und Wiens, 1872 - treatise on some new Hyphomycetes.
- Beiträge zur Kenntniss der Pflanzenbezoare des Pferdes und des Rindes, 1875 - Contribution to the understanding of plant bezoars of horses and cattle.
- Landwirthschaftliche Samenkunde. Handbuch für Botaniker, Landwirthe, Gärtner, Droguisten, Hygieniker, 1885.

Harz also made contributions towards Schlechtendal's Flora von Deutschland.

== See also ==
- Harz, the highest mountain range in Northern Germany
