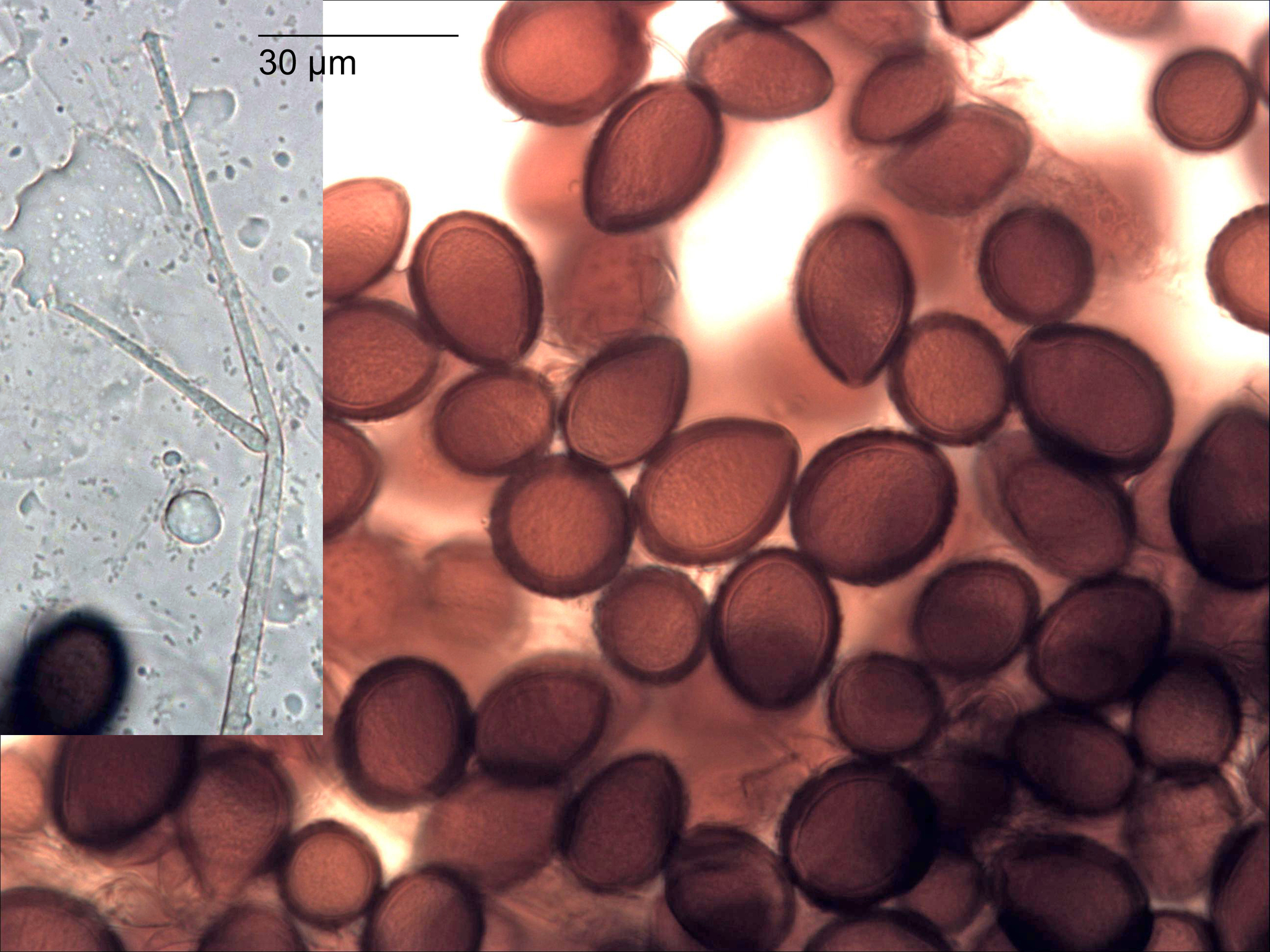
- Hyphal growth (inset) and ascospores of Harzia acremonioides

Scientific classification
- Kingdom: Fungi
- Division: Ascomycota
- Class: Sordariomycetes
- Order: Coronophorales
- Family: Ceratostomataceae
- Genus: Harzia
- Species: H. acremonioides

Binomial name
- Harzia acremonioides (Harz) Costantin (1888)

Synonyms
- Acremoniella atra Sylloge Fungorum 4: 302 (1886); Monosporium acremonioides Harz (1872); Monopodium uredopsisDelacr. (1890); Eidamia acremonioides (Harz) Lindau (1904)

= Harzia acremonioides =

Species of fungus

Harzia acremonioides is a species of seed-borne fungus that occurs in the soil. It has been categorized in the Ceratostomataceae family and under the genus Harzia. The genus Harzia contained up to three accepted species: H. acremonioides, H. verrucose, and H. velatea in 1974. Within the genus Harzia, H. acremonioides is one of the most common species that can be found in all climate regions around the world.

== History and taxonomy ==
The species was first named as Acremonium atrum in 1837 by Corda. Then in 1871, Harz named it Monosporium acremonioides. In 1886, the species got its well-known name Acremoniella atra (Corda) Sacc.. However, Holubová-Jechová pointed out the fact that "atrum" frequently refers to a black fungus, which is not the species look like, so the legitimate name of the species was later replaced by Harzia acremoniodies (Harz) which was given by Costantin in 1888. The species was named Monopodium uredopsis by Delacroix in 1890, and again in 1904, it was named as Eidamia acremonioides by Lindau, and she put the species under a new genus named Eidamia, but the legitimate name of the species remains unchanged.

The genus name of Eidamia was in honour of Michael Emil Eduard Eidam (1845 - 1901), a German apothecary and botanist (mycology) from Breslau.

== Growth and morphology ==
The genus Harzia consists of a hyaline mycelium, a brown thick-walled blastoconidia, and hyaline conidiophores. As of a member of the genus Harzia, the spores of H. acremonioides are large, one-celled, cinnamon brown or golden brown, ovoid to sugblobose, thick-walled, usually smooth-walled, but sometimes with a slight wrinkling or the exposure, and they tend to vary in size.

H. acremonioides are produced asexually, at 20 °C on MEA, its colonies can reach about 3.3 cm diam in about just five days, and 20-30 x 15-20 um, almost smooth-walled obovoid conidia are produced.

Growths of H. acremonioides can be obtained on potato mush agar, potato glucose agar, potato extract agar, and rice; slightly growth can be obtained in solutions of sucrose and maltose and a synthetic nutrient agar. The growth of H. acremonioides on rice is colored brown, and when growing the species on potato mush agar at 20 °C, firmly growth of mycelium was obtained producing megaspores.

== Physiology ==
For H. acremonioides, the production of the conidia and the color of the macrospore are affected by temperature. At 20 °C, optimum growth in all the culture media employed can be obtained, numerous conidia and brown megaspores were formed; at 30 °C, very little growth are obtained, no conidia were observed, and the majority of the megaspores were hyaline; and when grow the species on synthetic nutrient agar, no growth occurred at 25 or 30 °C.

In addition to temperature, the presence of other fungi may also have decided effects on the growth of H. acremonioides. When H. acremonioides is isolated from seeds, the fungus is always associated with another fungus named Alternaria tenuis auct.. With the presence of Alternaria tenuis auct., H. acremonioides grows rapidly, producing abundant spores and mycelium, and when grow H. acremonioides in pure culture, it grows much slowly and produces less mycelium and fewer spores

== Habitat and ecology ==
H. acremonioides is classified as a plant-pathogenic fungus, however, it does not appear to be of serious pathological significance.

Generally, the species has been regarded as a type of Saprotroph. It can directly acquire nutrients from wild plants and cultivated plants includes Pteridium aquilinum, beet, alfalfa, Pteridium aquilinum, Heracleum sphondylium, Scrophularia nodosa, Urtica sp. Rumex acetosella ryegrass and Chrysanthemum cinerariifolium.

H. acremonioides has been found widely distributed on various substrata. It has been reported from peat bogs in Ireland soil in the Netherlands, Germany, Canada, the United States, the British Isles, Australia, Papua, Mozambique, Sierra Leone, Rhodesia and Kenya, carst caves in the USSR and Yugoslavia, coniferous forests in Japan and Hungary, whereas the main recorded substrates are the seeds of different plants that are often found in association with Alternaria alternata. The species has been isolated from seeds from the Netherlands, Denmark, British Columbia, and Ontario., and a variety of seeds that associated with the species includes Allium cepa L. (onion), Beta vulgaris L. (beet), Daucus carota L. var. sat'iaa DC. (carrot), clover, peas, wheat, grass, cotton, radish, timothy and sorghum. It has also been isolated from rotting stems and leaves of clover, radish, Betula alba, tomato, beans, corn, Salsola kali, graminaceous plants.

== Mycoparasitism ==
According to Urbasch’s research in 1986, H. acremonioides can act as a biotrophic parasite to parasitizes the species Stemphylium botryosum with lobed, contact cells that work as appressoria are being utilized, which can cause little damages to the species. However, H. acremonioides can still grow without host fungi.

Besides the ability to parasite the species Stemphylium botryosum, H. acremonioides can also invade the sclerotia of some species which ends up with a drastic reduction in the number of viable sclerotia. In order to control H. acremonioides, pycnidial dust can be used as a seed dressing to protect the seeds.
