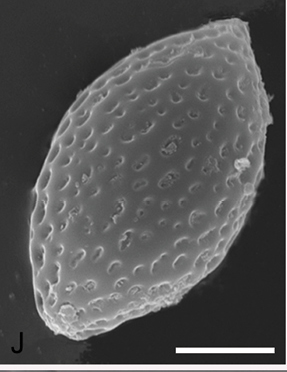
- scanning electron microscopy of ascospore; scale bar: 5 μm

Scientific classification
- Kingdom: Fungi
- Division: Ascomycota
- Class: Sordariomycetes
- Order: Coronophorales
- Family: Ceratostomataceae
- Genus: Microthecium
- Species: M. japonicum

Binomial name
- Microthecium japonicum (Y.Horie, Udagawa & P.F.Cannon) Y.Marín, Stchigel, Guarro & Cano (2018)

Synonyms
- Persiciospora japonica Y.Horie, Udagawa & P.F.Cannon (1986)

= Microthecium japonicum =

Species of fungus

Microthecium japonicum is a species of fungus in the family Ceratostomataceae. It was first described as a new species in 1986, as Persiciospora japonica. The species epithet refers to Japan, where the type specimen was collected in 1975. It was reclassified in Microthecium in 2018.

It is distinguished by its ostiolate ascomata (fruiting bodies with a small pore-like opening) and ellipsoid to spindle-shaped (fusiform) ascospores with a pitted, net-like surface pattern. It resembles M. moureai in these general features, but differs in producing a phialidic asexual form and small bulbil-like propagules, which are absent in M. moureai. The spore surface in M. japonicum is also more finely reticulate, whereas M. moureai has a coarser reticulation.
