= Ocellularia subpraestans =

Scientific classification
- Kingdom: Fungi
- Division: Ascomycota
- Class: Lecanoromycetes
- Order: Graphidales
- Family: Graphidaceae
- Genus: Ocellularia
- Species: O. subpraestans

Binomial name
- Ocellularia subpraestans (Hale) Hale (1980)

Synonyms
- Thelotrema subpraestans Hale (1974)

Species of lichen-forming fungus

Ocellularia subpraestans is a species of bark-dwelling crustose lichen in the family Graphidaceae. It was formally described as a new species in 1974 by the American lichenologist Mason Hale, who classified it as a member of Thelotrema. It is characterized by its numerous apothecia (fruiting bodies) and the presence of the lichen substances stictic acid and constictic acid. The type specimen was collected by Hale in 1973 from a rainforest near the El Llano–Cartí road in Panamá Province, Panama. Hale compared it to the related species Ocellularia praestans, found in the West Indies and Brazil, which has fewer apothecia. Hale reclassified it in Ocellularia in 1980.

Ocellularia subpraestans has attracted attention for its unusually large sexual spores. In a microscopic study of ascospore development and release, the species was reported to produce extremely long, many-celled (muriform) ascospores, reaching up to 880 × 65 μm; specimens from Costa Rica and Panama often had spores around 750 × 50 μm, with occasional spores exceeding 800 × 60 μm. Rather than being forcibly discharged into the air, the spores were observed protruding from the pore of an apothecium and beginning germination immediately; fine germ tubes can emerge from multiple cells along a single spore.

== See also ==
- List of Ocellularia species
