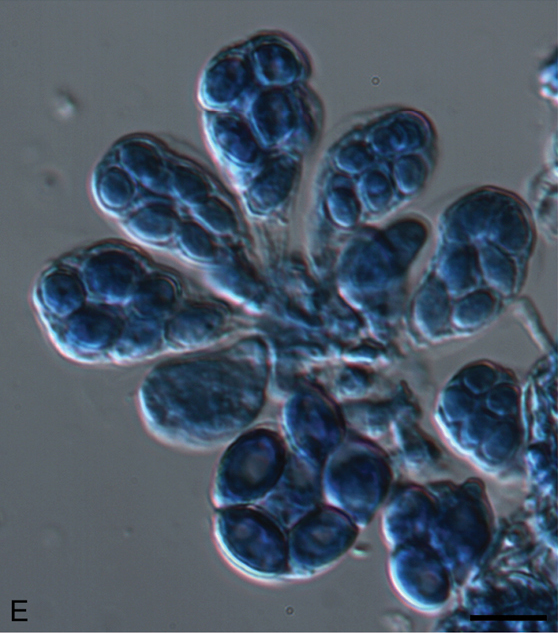
- Asci with ascospores; scale bar: 10 μm

Scientific classification
- Kingdom: Fungi
- Division: Ascomycota
- Class: Sordariomycetes
- Order: Coronophorales
- Family: Ceratostomataceae
- Genus: Microthecium
- Species: M. levitum

Binomial name
- Microthecium levitum Udagawa & Cain (1970)

Synonyms
- Sphaerodes levita (Udagawa & Cain) Dania García, Stchigel & Guarro (2004)

= Microthecium levitum =

Species of fungus

Microthecium levitum is a species of fungus in the family Ceratostomataceae. It was formally described in 1969 by Shun-ichi Udagawa and Roy F. Cain from a culture isolated from soil in Tokyo, Japan.

It produces minute, nearly spherical perithecia (sexual fruiting bodies) that stay closed (non-ostiolate) and are usually about 110–240 μm across. Because the wall is thin and semi-transparent, the developing dark spore mass is visible through it. Inside, the 8-spored sacs (asci) are short-lived and break down at maturity, releasing the spores into the cavity as a black, spherical clump about 70–150 μm wide. The sexual spores (ascospores) begin colourless with prominent oil droplets, then become dark olive-brown and opaque. They are smooth-walled and lemon-shaped, with slightly raised ends bearing small germ pores, and they are typically about 15–16.5 μm long (range 10.5–17 μm).

In culture it can also reproduce asexually by forming phialides on aerial hyphae that produce tiny, one-celled conidia in short chains, and it may form thick-walled, multi-septate chlamydospores. Perithecia can ripen within about 8–10 days on some media, but on potato dextrose agar they often fail to mature unless other fungi are present, and growth is absent at 37 °C. It is separated from the type species, Microthecium zobelii, by its smaller, more symmetrical ascospores, and the lack of an ostiole is also the main character used to distinguish Microthecium from the otherwise similar genus Melanospora.
