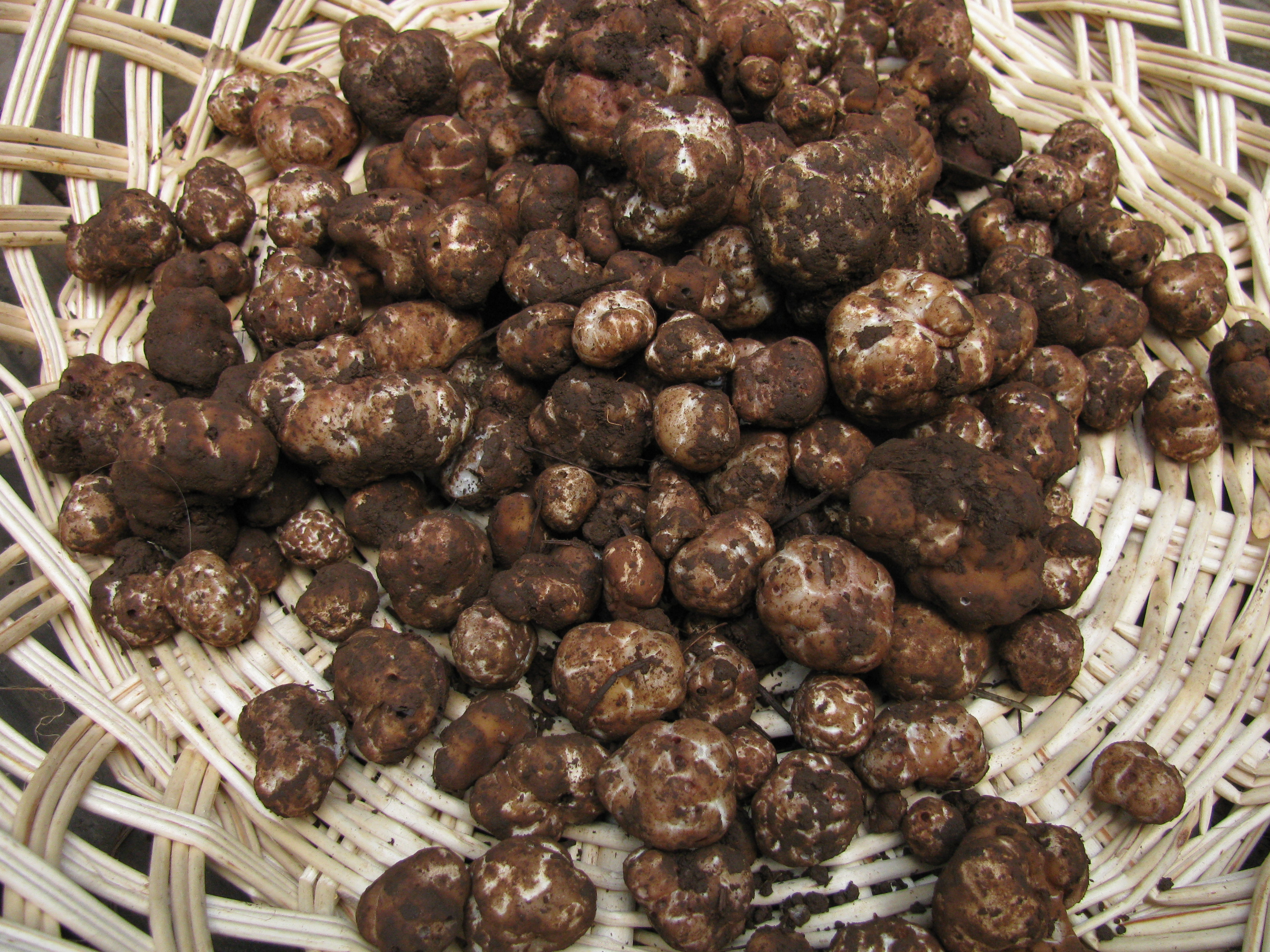

Scientific classification
- Kingdom: Fungi
- Division: Ascomycota
- Class: Pezizomycetes
- Order: Pezizales
- Family: Tuberaceae
- Genus: Tuber
- Species: T. gibbosum

Binomial name
- Tuber gibbosum Harkness (1899)

= Tuber gibbosum =

Species of fungus

Tuber gibbosum, commonly known as the Oregon white truffle, is a species of truffle in the genus Tuber. It is found in the Pacific Northwest region of the United States, where it often grows with Douglas-fir.

== Taxonomy ==
- - - - - - Tuber gibbosum
          - Tuber bellisporum
        - Tuber castellanoi
      - Tuber oregonense
    - - Tuber sphaerosporum
      - - Tuber anniae
        - Tuber borchii
  - Tuber irradians

Phylogeny of Tuber species in the Gibbosum clade, based on ribosomal DNA sequences.

The species was first described by American mycologist Harvey Wilson Harkness in 1899. The specific epithet derives from the Latin word gibbosum meaning "humped", and refers to the irregular lobes and humps on larger specimens. T. gibbosum is part of the gibbosum clade of the genus Tuber. Species in this clade have unusual "peculiar wall thickenings on hyphal tips emerging from the peridial surface at maturity."

== Description ==
Tuber gibbosum
- Mycological characteristics
- Glebal hymenium
- Hymenium attachment is not applicable
- Lacks a stipe
- Spore print is blackish-brown to brown
- Ecology is mycorrhizal
- Edibility is choice

The species grows up to 5 centimetres (2 in) across.

T. gibbosum resembles T. oregonense; both are found growing under Douglas-fir.

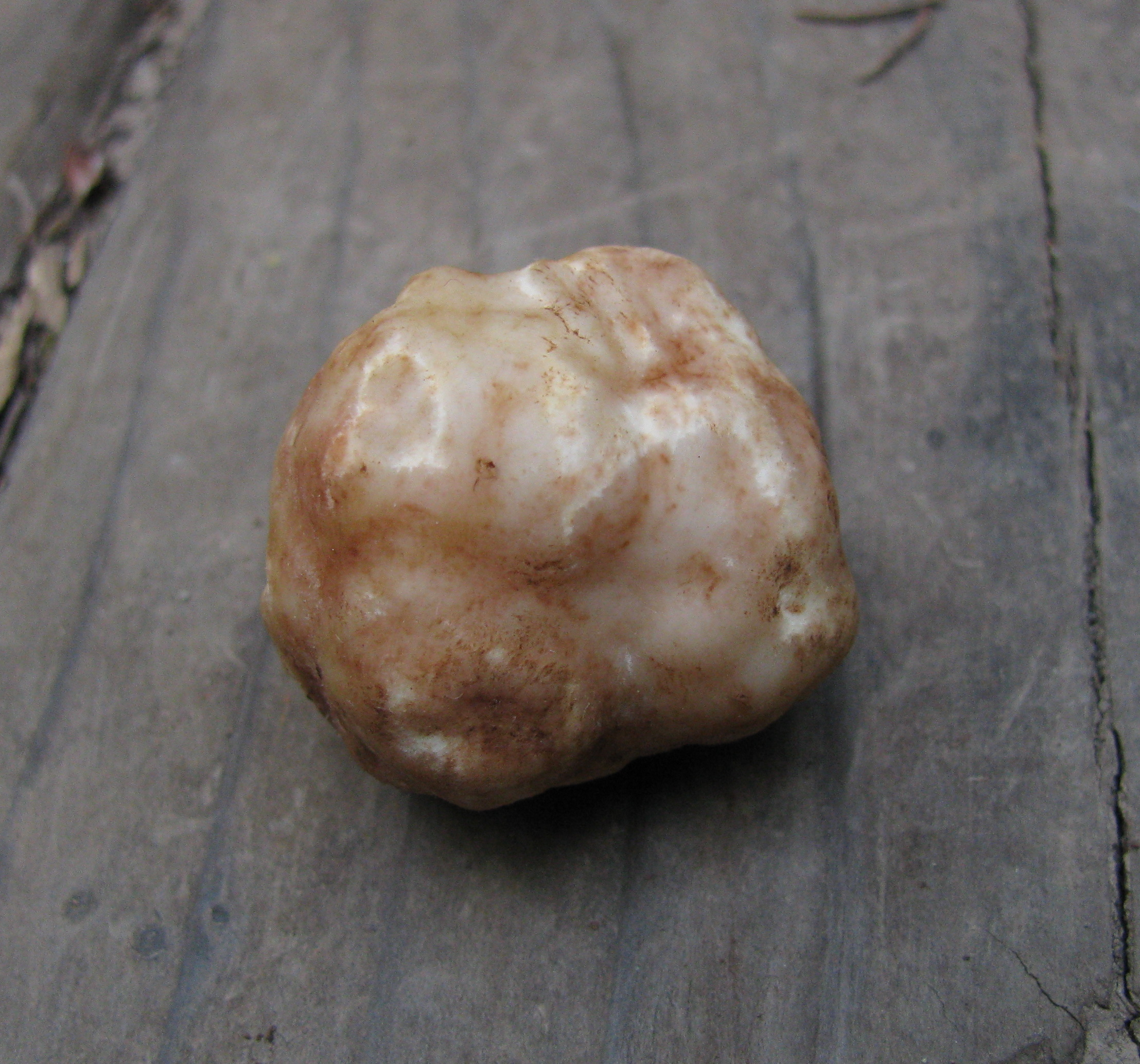
Fruit body

== Distribution and habitat ==
It is found in the Pacific Northwest region of the United States, where it grows in association with Douglas-fir.

== Uses ==
Tuber gibbosum is edible and can be prepared similarly to European truffles; it is typically used to add flavor to a dish.

It is commercially collected between as early as October and into March.
