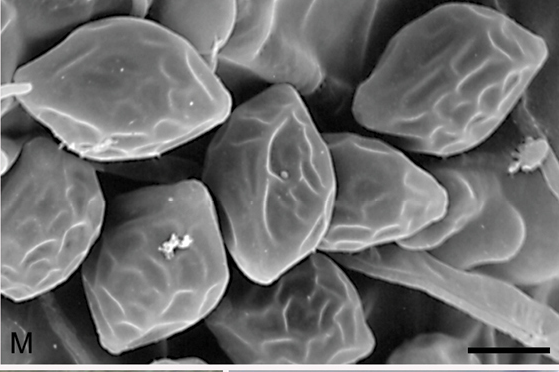
- Ascospores; scale bar: 5 μm

Scientific classification
- Kingdom: Fungi
- Division: Ascomycota
- Class: Sordariomycetes
- Order: Coronophorales
- Family: Ceratostomataceae
- Genus: Microthecium
- Species: M. fimicola

Binomial name
- Microthecium fimicola (E.C.Hansen) Y.Marín, Stchigel, Guarro & Cano (2018)

Synonyms
- Melanospora fimicola E.C.Hansen (1877); Sphaeroderma fimicola (E.C.Hansen) Sacc. (1883); Sphaerodes fimicola (E.C.Hansen) P.F.Cannon & D.Hawksw. (1982); Sphaeroderma hulseboschii Oudem. (1886); Melanospora hulseboschii (Oudem.) Doguet (1955)

= Microthecium fimicola =

Species of fungus

Microthecium fimicola is a species of ascomycete fungus in the family Ceratostomataceae. It is characterised by ascomata (sexual fruiting bodies) that have a distinct opening (an ostiole) and by dark, thick-walled ascospores whose surfaces are coarsely net-like (reticulate). Each spore has a pronounced, pointed germ pore at both ends, a feature used to separate it from similar species. Among the Microthecium species that share the same combination of an ostiole and reticulate spores (M. internum and M. quadrangulatum) M. fimicola is distinguished mainly by spore shape: its ascospores are typically lemon-shaped (citriform), whereas those of M. internum are more spindle-shaped and those of M. quadrangulatum are fusiform. Some isolates of M. fimicola have also been observed to produce bulbils (small, compact vegetative propagules), a trait that was not reported in earlier accounts of the species.
