= Vittatispora =

Scientific classification
- Domain: Eukaryota
- Kingdom: Fungi
- Division: Ascomycota
- Class: Sordariomycetes
- Order: Coronophorales
- Family: Ceratostomataceae
- Genus: Vittatispora; P.Chaudhary, J.Campb., D.Hawksw. & K.N.Sastry (2006)
- Species: V. coorgii

Binomial name
- Vittatispora coorgii P.Chaudhary, J.Campb., D.Hawksw. & K.N.Sastry (2006)

Genus of fungi

Vittatispora is a fungus genus in the family Ceratostomataceae. This is a monotypic genus, containing the single species Vittatispora coorgii.
