= Arxiomyces =

Scientific classification
- Domain: Eukaryota
- Kingdom: Fungi
- Division: Ascomycota
- Class: Sordariomycetes
- Order: Coronophorales
- Family: Ceratostomataceae
- Genus: Arxiomyces; P.F. Cannon & D. Hawksw.

Type species
- Arxiomyces vitis (Fuckel) P.F. Cannon & D. Hawksw.

Species
- Arxiomyces campanulatus Arxiomyces vitis Arxiomyces zuberiensis

Genus of fungi

Arxiomyces is a genus of fungi within the Ceratostomataceae family.
