= Rhytidospora =

Scientific classification
- Domain: Eukaryota
- Kingdom: Fungi
- Division: Ascomycota
- Class: Sordariomycetes
- Order: Coronophorales
- Family: Ceratostomataceae
- Genus: Rhytidospora; Jeng & Cain (1977)

Type species
- Rhytidospora tetraspora Jeng & Cain (1977)

Genus of fungi

Rhytidospora is a genus of fungi within the family Ceratostomataceae.

== Species ==
As accepted by Species Fungorum;

- Rhytidospora bispora J.C. Krug & Jeng (1979)
- Rhytidospora cainii Guarro (1983)
- Rhytidospora citriformis Valldos. & Guarro (1994)
- Rhytidospora inordinata (Malloch & Cain) J.C. Krug & Jeng (1979)
- Rhytidospora tetraspora Jeng & Cain (1977)
