= Pustulipora =

Scientific classification
- Domain: Eukaryota
- Kingdom: Fungi
- Division: Ascomycota
- Class: Sordariomycetes
- Order: Coronophorales
- Family: Ceratostomataceae
- Genus: Pustulipora; P.F. Cannon
- Species: P. corticola

Binomial name
- Pustulipora corticola P.F. Cannon

Synonyms
- Sphaeroderma theleboloides Fuckel, Jb. nassau. Ver. Naturk. 29-30: 23 (1875); Melanospora theleboloides (Fuckel) G. Winter, Rabenh. Krypt.-Fl., Edn 2 (Leipzig) 1.2: 94 (1884); Byssonectria theleboloides (Fuckel) Cooke, Grevillea 12(no. 64): 109 (1884); Microthecium theleboloides (Fuckel) Höhn., Sber. Akad. Wiss. Wien, Math.-naturw. Kl., Abt. 1 123: 98 (1914)

Genus of fungi

Pustulipora is a genus of fungi within the Ceratostomataceae family. This is a monotypic genus, containing the single species Pustulipora corticola.
