= Scopinella =

Scientific classification
- Kingdom: Fungi
- Division: Ascomycota
- Class: Sordariomycetes
- Order: Coronophorales
- Family: Ceratostomataceae
- Genus: Scopinella; Lév.

Type species
- Scopinella pleiospora (J. Schröt.) Sacc.

Genus of fungi

Scopinella is a genus of fungi in the Coronophorales order. The relationship of this taxon to other taxa within the order was unknown (incertae sedis), It has since been placed into the family Ceratostomataceae.

== Species ==
As accepted by Species Fungorum;

- Scopinella barbata (Pers.) Lév. (1878)
- Scopinella caulincola (Fuckel) Malloch (1976)
- Scopinella gallicola Tsuneda & Y. Hirats. (1981)
- Scopinella musciformis Stchigel, L. Umaña & Guarro (2007)
- Scopinella octahedrica (Pat.) Y. Marín, Stchigel, Guarro & Cano (2018)
- Scopinella pleiospora (J. Schröt.) Sacc. (1891)
- Scopinella pyramidospora R.M. Sánchez, L. Giord., F. Anderson & Bianchin. (2013)
- Scopinella solani (Zukal) Malloch (1976)
- Scopinella sphaerophila (Peck) Malloch (1976)
