= Erythrocarpon =

Scientific classification
- Domain: Eukaryota
- Kingdom: Fungi
- Division: Ascomycota
- Class: Sordariomycetes
- Order: Coronophorales
- Family: Ceratostomataceae
- Genus: Erythrocarpon; Zukal (1886)
- Species: E. microstomum

Binomial name
- Erythrocarpon microstomum Zukal (1885)

Genus of fungi

Erythrocarpon is a fungal genus. It was previously classified in the family Chaetomiaceae and Sordariales order, before being placed in the'Ceratostomataceae family and Coronophorales order.

This is a monotypic genus, containing the single species Erythrocarpon microstomum.
