= Harzia =

Scientific classification
- Domain: Eukaryota
- Kingdom: Fungi
- Division: Ascomycota
- Class: Sordariomycetes
- Order: Coronophorales
- Family: Ceratostomataceae
- Genus: Harzia; Costantin

Synonyms
- Acremoniella Sylloge Fungorum 4: 302 (1886); Monosporium Linig. Hyph.: 17 (1872) [1871]; MonopodiumDelacr., Bulletin de la Société Mycologique de France 6 (1): 99 (1890); Eidamia Rabenhorst's Kryptogamen-Flora, Pilze - Fungi imperfecti 1(8): 124 (1904)

Genus of fungi

Harzia is a genus of seed-borne fungus that occurs in the soil. It has been categorized in the Ceratostomataceae family. The genus Harzia originally contained three accepted species: Harzia acremonioides, Harzia verrucose, and Harzia velatea. Within the genus Harzia, Harzia acremonioides is one of the most common species that can be found in all climate regions around the world.

The genus name of Harzia is in honour of Carl Otto Harz (1842-1906), who was a German mycologist, pharmacist and botanist.

The genus and species Harzia acremonioides, was circumscribed by Julien Noël Costantin in Muced. Simples (Paris) on page 42 in 1888.

== Species ==
As accepted by Species Fungorum;

- Harzia acremonioides (Harz) Costantin (1888)
- Harzia africana (Saccas) D.W. Li & N.P. Schult. (2017)
- Harzia cameroonensis Crous & Jol. Roux (2013)
- Harzia combreti Crous (2021)
- Harzia macrospora (Farl. ex Sacc.) D.W. Li & N.P. Schult. (2017)
- Harzia metrosideri Crous (2019)
- Harzia palmara (Cooke) D.W. Li & N.P. Schult. (2017)
- Harzia patula (Sacc. & Berl.) D.W. Li & N.P. Schult. (2017)
- Harzia sphaerospora (Matsush.) D.W. Li & N.P. Schult. (2017)
- Harzia sympodialis (C. Perini) D.W. Li & N.P. Schult. (2017)
- Harzia tenella (Berk. & M.A. Curtis) D.W. Li & N.P. Schult. (2017)
- Harzia velata (Onions & D. Jones) Hol.-Jech. (1974)
- Harzia verrucosa (Tognini) Hol.-Jech. (1974)

== Growth and morphology ==
The genus Harzia consists of a hyaline mycelium, a brown thick-walled blastoconidia, and hyaline conidiophores.
