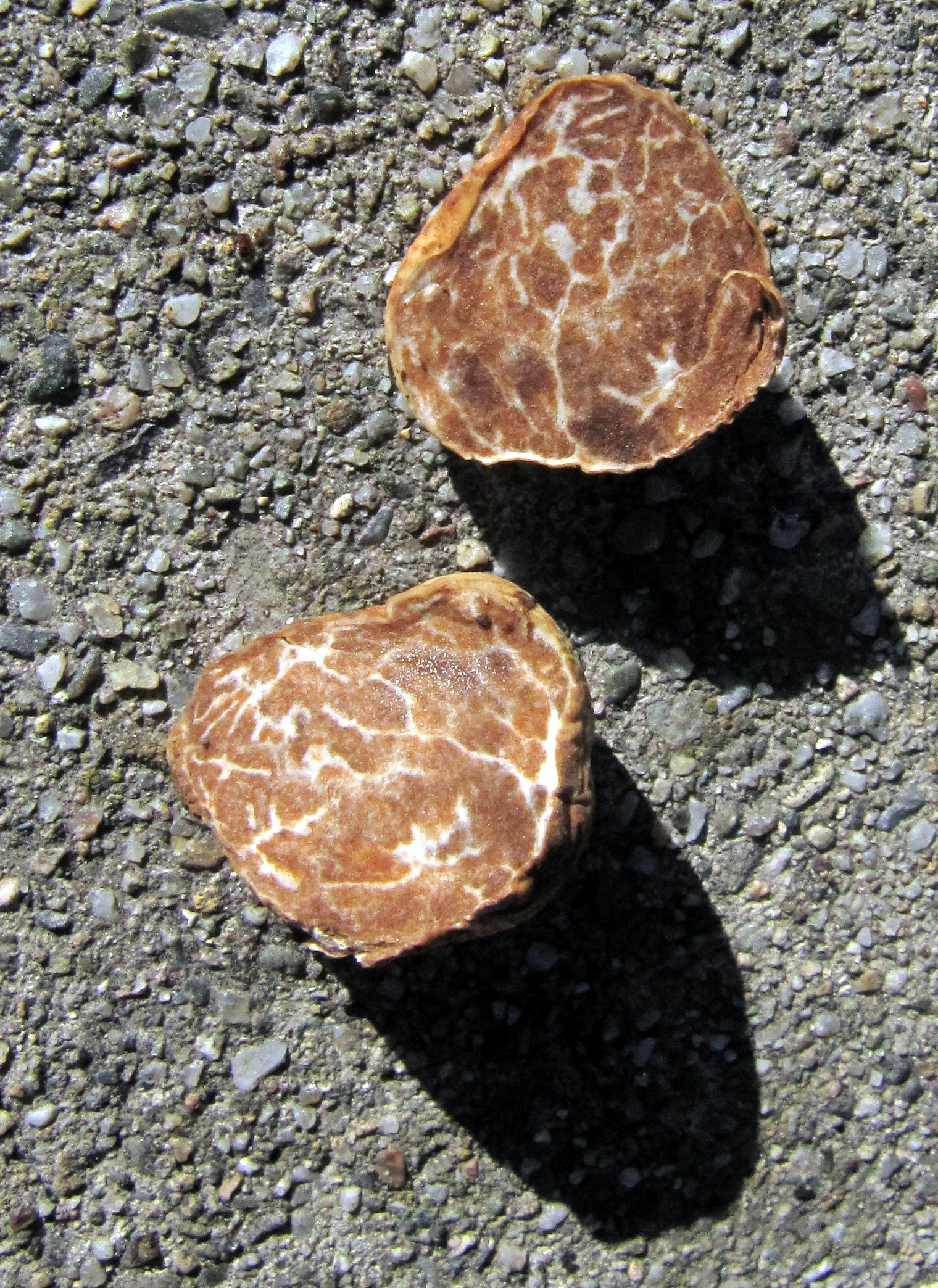

Scientific classification
- Kingdom: Fungi
- Division: Ascomycota
- Class: Pezizomycetes
- Order: Pezizales
- Family: Tuberaceae
- Genus: Tuber
- Species: T. oregonense

Binomial name
- Tuber oregonense Trappe, Bonito & Rawlinson (2010)

= Tuber oregonense =

Species of fungus

Tuber oregonense, commonly known as the Oregon white truffle, is a species of truffle in the genus Tuber. The species was described as new to science in 2010.

The fruit bodies are roughly spherical to irregular in shape, and resemble small potatoes up to 5 cm (2 in) in diameter. Inside the truffle is the gleba, which is initially white before it becomes a marbled tan color. The large, often thick-walled, and strongly ornamented spores are produced in large spherical asci.

The species is found on the western coast of North America, from northern California to southern British Columbia west of the Cascade Range. A mycorrhizal fungus, it grows in a symbiotic association with Douglas-fir. It overlaps in distribution with the closely related T. gibbosum, but they have different growing seasons: T. oregonense typically appears from October through March, while T. gibbosum grows from January to June.

The truffle is highly prized for its taste and aroma. Some individuals have claimed success in cultivating the truffles in Christmas tree farms. It is an edible truffle.

== Taxonomy ==
- - - - - - Tuber gibbosum
          - Tuber bellisporum
        - Tuber castellanoi
      - Tuber oregonense
    - - Tuber sphaerosporum
      - - Tuber anniae
        - Tuber borchii
  - Tuber irradians

Cladogram depicting the phylogenetic relationships of Tuber species in the Gibbosum clade, based on ribosomal DNA sequences.

The species was first officially described and named in a 2010 Mycologia article, although T. oregonense had been previously used provisionally (as Tuber oregonense Trappe & Bonito) in American field guides and other popular publications for several years. The type specimen was collected from Benton County, Oregon, on 3 February, 2007 along U.S. Route 20 in Oregon.

The specific epithet oregonense derives from the name Oregon and the Latin suffix -ense (relating to), in reference to western Oregon being its central region of abundance. The fungus is commonly known as the Oregon white truffle. Truffle authority James Trappe initially intended to name the species as a variety of T. gibbosum (i.e., as T. gibbosum var. oregonense) before molecular analysis revealed that genetic differences warranted distinction at the species level.

Tuber oregonense is part of the gibbosum clade of the genus Tuber, which contains species that have "peculiar wall thickenings on hyphal tips emerging from the peridial surface at maturity."

== Description ==
Tuber oregonense
- Mycological characteristics
- Glebal hymenium
- Hymenium attachment is not applicable
- Lacks a stipe
- Spore print is blackish-brown to brown
- Ecology is mycorrhizal
- Edibility is choice

The fruit bodies of T. oregonense are hypogeous (growing in the ground), typically 0.5–5 cm (0.2–2 in) broad, although specimens up to 7.5 cm (3 in) have been recorded. Smaller specimens are spherical or nearly so, and have random furrows; larger specimens are more irregular in shape, lobed and deeply furrowed. Young fruit bodies have a white peridium, as the truffle matures it develops red to reddish-brown or orangish-brown patches; with age it becomes orange-brown to reddish-brown overall and often develops cracks on the surface. The peridium is 0.2–0.4 mm thick, and the surface texture ranges from relatively smooth to covered with tiny "hairs" that are more dense in the furrows, and more scattered on the exposed lobes. The gleba is solid; in youth the fertile tissue is whitish and marbled with mostly narrow, white, hypha-stuffed veins that emerge throughout the peridium to its surface. In maturity, the fertile tissue is light brown to brown from the color of the spores, but the marbling veins remain white. The odor and flavor of the flesh are mild in youth, but soon become strong, pungent and complex, or "truffly".

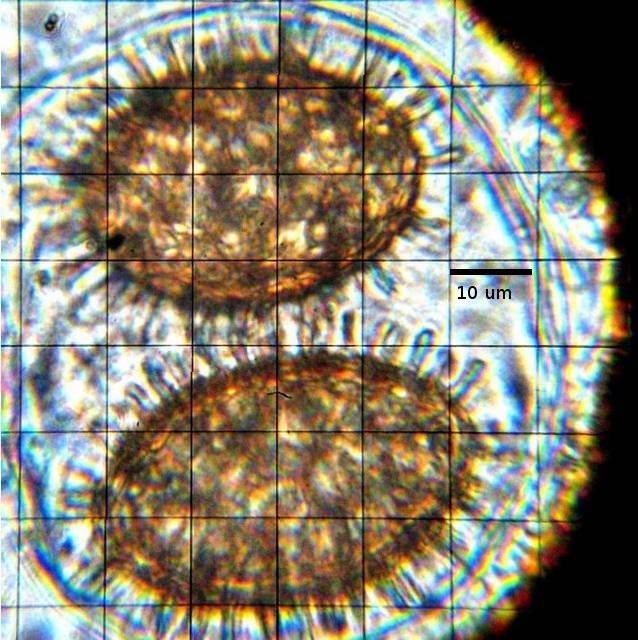
A two-spored ascus; the ellipsoid spores have a honeycomb-like surface network ornamented with numerous spikes.

The spores are ellipsoid to somewhat spindle-shaped with narrowed ends, and light brownish in color. The size of the spores varies depending upon the type of asci in which they develop: in one-spored asci they measure 42.5–62.5 by 17.5–30 μm; in two-spored asci they are 32.5–50 by 15–25 μm; in three-spored asci they are 27.5–45 by 15–25 μm; in four-spored asci they are 25–38.5 by 13–28 μm; in five-spored asci 28–34 by 22–25 μm (all sizes excluding surface ornamentation). The spore walls are 2–3 μm thick and are covered with a honeycomb-like (alveolate) network. The cavities of the honeycomb typically have five or six sides, and the corners form spines that are 5–7 μm tall by 0.5 μm thick. A "microreticulum" appears in some spores when the light microscope objective is focused on the optical cross section but not on the spore wall surface, or on scanning electron microscopy micrographs of the surface. Young asci range in shape from spherical to broadly ellipsoid to ovoid (egg-shaped) or pyriform (pear-shaped); sometimes the base of the ascus is narrowed like a stipe, and measures up to 15 by 7 μm. Mature asci are spherical to broadly ellipsoid or misshapen from the pressure of crowded spores within. They are hyaline (translucent), thin-walled, 60–85 by 65–75 μm, 1–4-(occasionally 5)-spored, and astipitate (without a stipe) at maturity.

The peridiopellis (the cuticle of the peridium) is 200–300 μm thick plus or minus 80 μm of tightly interwoven hyphae that are 3–5 (sometimes up to 10) μm broad. The cells are short and have nearly hyaline walls that measure 0.5–1 μm thick; the interior veins emerge through the peridium the cells and often form a localized tissue of rounded cells up to 12 μm broad. The degree to which the surface is covered with fine "hairs" is variable; these hairs are made of tangled hyphae and emergent thin-walled hyphal tips 2–5 μm in diameter, some even and smooth, some with granulated surfaces and some with moniliform walls (resembling a string of beads) that are irregularly thickened by hyaline bands that are 0.5–2 μm wide. The subpellis (the tissue layer immediately under the pellis) is abruptly differentiated from the pellis, 150–220 μm thick, and comprises interwoven, nearly hyaline, thin-walled hyphae 2–10 μm wide with scattered cells up to 15 μm wide. The gleba is made of hyaline, thin-walled, interwoven hyphae that are 2–7 μm broad with scattered cells that are inflated up to 15 μm.

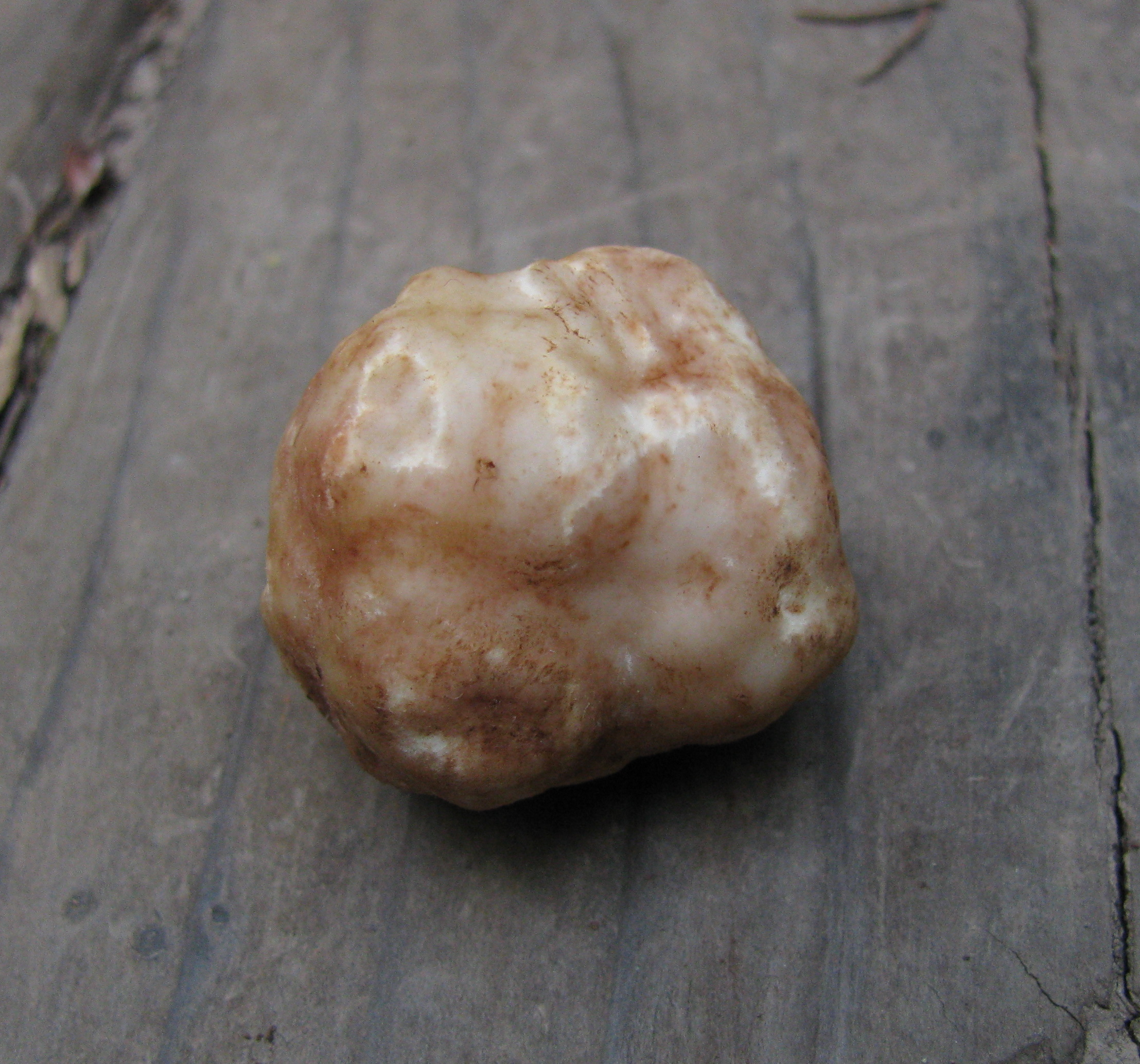
T. gibbosum is very similar in appearance, but is harvested in a different season.

=== Similar species ===
Tuber oregonense closely resembles T. gibbosum, which grows in the same habitats, but may be distinguished by the structure of its peridium, and differences in spores size and shape. Further, T. gibbosum grows from January to June.

== Ecology, habitat, and distribution ==
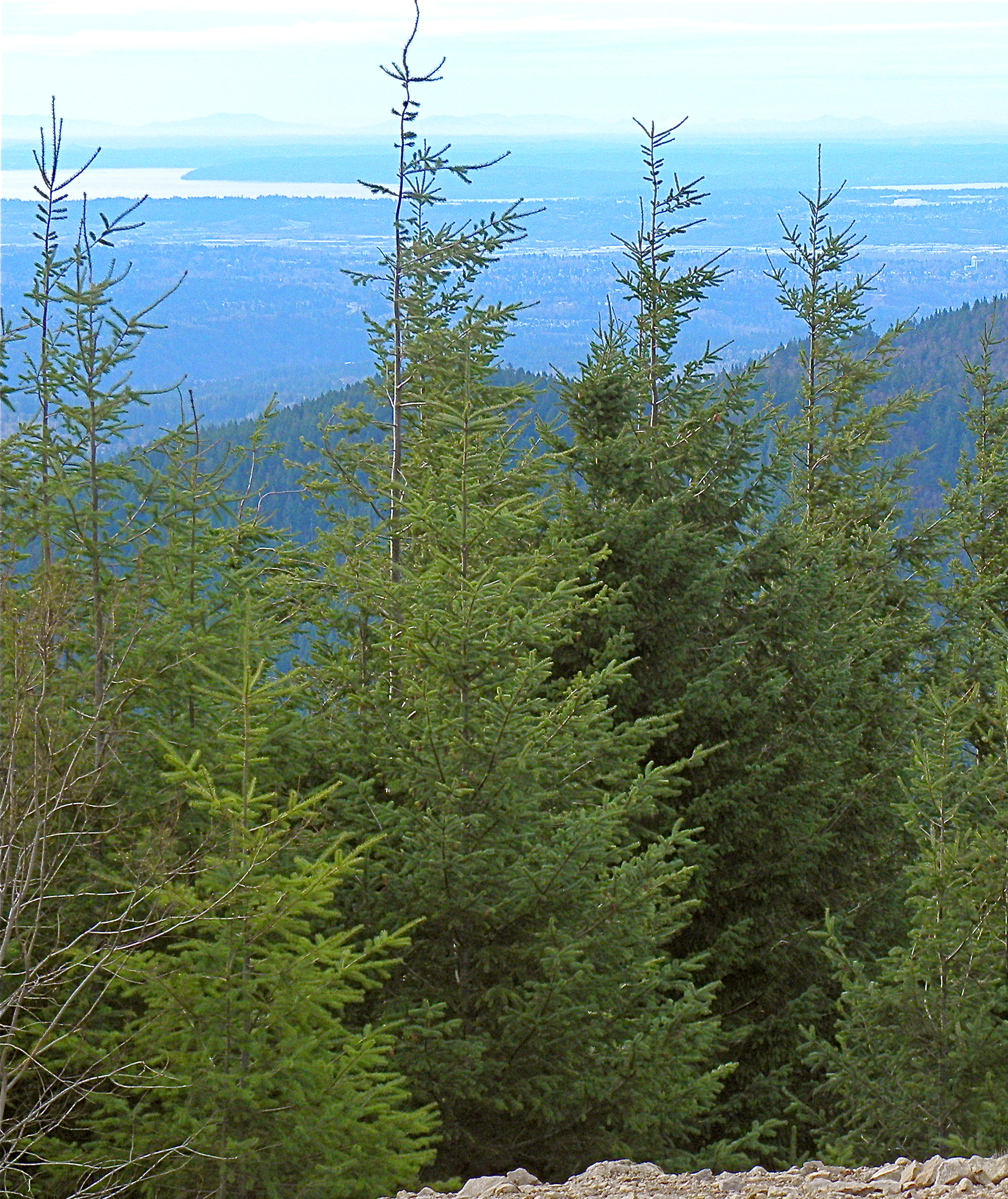
Pseudotsuga menziesii (Douglas-fir)

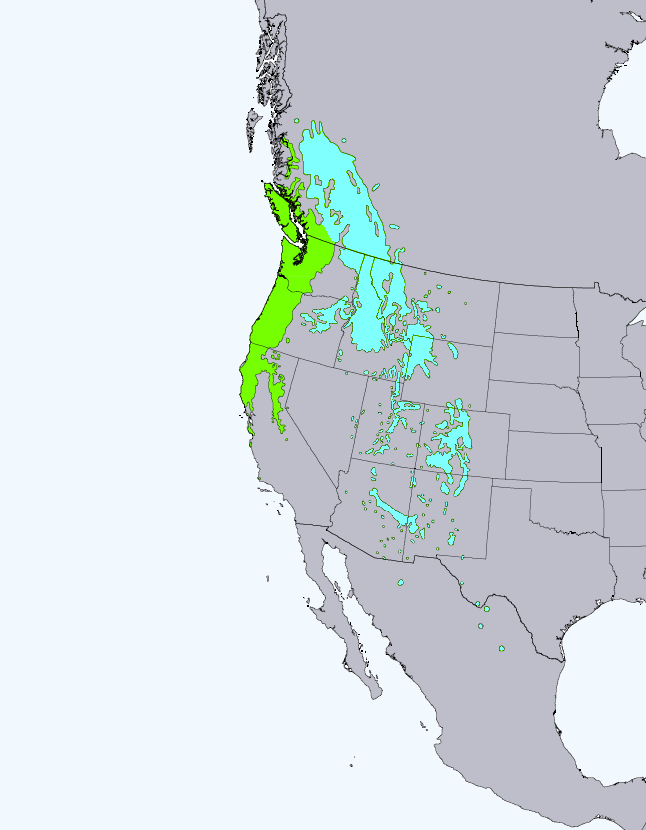
Distribution of P. menziesii

Like all Tuber species, T. oregonense is mycorrhizal. The fungus grows west of the Cascade Mountains from the southern Puget Sound region of Washington, south to southwestern Oregon at elevations from near sea level up to 425 m (1,390 ft) in pure stands of Pseudotsuga menziesii forests up to 100 years old, or Pseudotsuga mixed with Tsuga heterophylla, Picea sitchensis, or Alnus species. The species has been commercially harvested in the Pacific Northwest since the 1980s. and is often found in Christmas tree plantations as young as five years. The Oregon Truffle Festival, held in Eugene yearly since 2006 to coincide with the maturing of the truffle in late January, features activities such as cultivation seminars and truffle hunting excursions. Fruit bodies are produced from September through the middle of March. The fungus is an important component of the diet of northern flying squirrels, and comprises the majority of their diet at certain times of the year.

Some individuals have claimed to have had success in growing the truffles in Christmas tree farms in Oregon. Techniques reportedly involve inoculating the ground under young Douglas-fir trees with a slurry comprising ground-up truffles mixed in water, or the feces of animals fed truffles, but no concrete evidence shows these methods can be used to establish new truffle patches or to improve the productivity of existing patches.

== Uses ==
Tuber oregonense is a choice edible species. Its odor has been described as "truffly", a complex of garlic, spices, cheese, and "indefinable other essences"; the fungus is prized by commercial truffle harvesters and consumers for its intense fragrance. Because they grow in the topsoil and needles, they are considered to have a more "floral" and "herbal" flavor profile than related European truffles.
