= Triangularia setosa =

Scientific classification
- Kingdom: Fungi
- Division: Ascomycota
- Class: Sordariomycetes
- Order: Sordariales
- Family: Podosporaceae
- Genus: Triangularia
- Species: T. setosa

Binomial name
- Triangularia setosa (G.Winter) X.Wei Wang & Houbraken (2019)

Synonyms
- Sordaria setosa G.Winter (1873); Philocorpa setosa Sacc. (1882); Pleurage setosa Kuntze (1898); Podospora setosa (G.Winter) Niessl (1883); Cladochaete setosa (G.Winter) Sacc. (1912)

Species of fungus in the family Podosporaceae

Triangularia setosa is a member of the Ascomycota, and of the genus Triangularia. This genus is notable for its widespread appearance on the excrement of herbivores, and is therefore seen as a coprophilous fungus. The fungus itself is characteristically dark in colour and produces sac-like perithecium with a covering of hair. Its dispersion involves the ingestion, passage, and projectile ejection of spores. It has preference for colonizing the dung of lagomorphs, such as hares and rabbits.

== History and taxonomy ==
Triangularia setosa was first described in Germany in the year 1873 under its basionym Sordaria setosa by G. Winter. In 1883, the fungus was given the name Podospora setosa by mycologist Niessl. Since 1883, P. setosa has had synonymy within multiple genera including Pleurage (1898), Philocopra (1907), and Cladocheate (1912). These genera can share similar morphology of ascus and spores, as well as habitat. Most recently, the species was transferred to the genus Triangularia by X.W. Wang and Houbraken in 2019. The genus Triangularia is distinguished by its triangular, or wedge-like, appearance of spores.

== Growth and morphology ==
Triangularia setosa grows optimally at 25 °C and in conditions where light is present. Its rate of growth and production of fruiting bodies can be manipulated by the presence or absence of light. In the absence of light, growth is stunted and production of perithecium does not occur. The only exception to this is in conditions where high amounts of water are present, in which perithecium may develop. In light conditions, perithecium will develop and the fungus will grow maximally. Triangularia setosa develops best in light on the shorter end of the visible spectrum. Longer wavelengths have been shown to be less effective at promoting growth, with the maximum wavelength for growth production being 510 nm.

Triangularia setosa is multicellular and has been observed in its sexual state only. As a member of the Ascomycota, development of ascus occurs within a sac-like structure. This sac, the perithecia, has a wide base, thin neck, and is covered in hairs. Triangularia setosa has the majority of these hairs are at the base of its fruiting body. The hairs are off-white in colour and are approximately 600μm long and 3μm wide. This fungus has an apical ring, which may vary in visibility as it has been described as both conspicuous and non-conspicuous in the literature.

Inside the perithecia are asci, each containing eight ascospores. A perithecia of P. setosa has been estimated to house 512 spores. The spores themselves are 19μm in length with a single apex on which exists a germ pore. Inside the ascus, spores are arranged densely and without organization. When mature, they are brown in colour, ellipsoidal in shape, and are coated in a clear hyaline covering. The spores possess a primary appendage at the distal end, and a secondary appendage at the apex. The secondary appendage, a feature which is commonly seen in coprophilous fungi, is thought to help with attachment to plant material. Under heavy-water conditions, swelling of the hyaline sheathe and activation of the secondary appendage allows for optimal attachment to surfaces.

== Physiology ==
The cycle of successional colonization of P. setosa involves the ingestion and excretion of the fungus by herbivorous animals. Spore projection from animal excrement allows for transferring of the fungus between animals.

The process of spore dispersal requires the build-up of osmotic pressure inside the perithecia. At the threshold of pressure, ejection of spores occur through the apical pore. This pore is surrounded by an elastic ring which changes shape as the spore passes. The recoil of the apical ring back to its original shape following distortion amplifies the velocity at which spores exit the ascus. In the case of P. setosa, spores released in larger quantities (>100) may be ejected up to a distance of 35 cm. Notably, spore release may become rhythmic if given a day-night cycle.

== Habitat and ecology ==
The favoured carbon source for P. setosa is the excrement of herbivorous animals, due to the broken-down plant material and abundance of Nitrogen. Though it is primarily found in the dung of herbivores, there are records of the fungus in the feces of omnivores. The dominance of bacteria makes this an unlikely occurrence, and as such it has yet to be recorded on the excrement of any carnivorous animals. Triangularia setosa may also be found on non-digested material, such as vegetable seeds, soil, and decaying plant material.

Triangularia setosa has been documented within many different countries including Canada, Germany, Spain, Brazil, Australia, the United Kingdom, and Ireland. These records indicate its presence in the excrement of rabbits, geese, farm animals, horses, and possums. The fungus itself favours the colonization of lagomorphs over ruminants, but surprisingly can be found on material passed by both types of digestion. This shows an ability to withstand digestion from several hours up to several days, as lagomorphs routinely ingest their own fecal matter. The smaller percentage of colonization in ruminants and horses may be due to competition with other types of cophriphilous fungi, who are not able to withstand the longer digestion times of lagomorphs.
