= Air filtration in operating rooms =

Air filtration guidelines for operating rooms are determined by the American Society of Heating, Refrigerating and Air-Conditioning Engineers (ASHRAE) using a standard known as Minimum Efficiency Reporting Value (MERV). MERV is determined based on the size of particles successfully removed from the air and is used to classify the efficiency of HEPA filters. Ratings range from 1-16 and efficiency increases as the rating increases. ASHRAE groups surgeries into three categories: minor surgical procedures (A); minor or major surgical procedures performed with minor sedation (B); and major surgical procedures performed with general anesthesia or regional block anesthesia (C). Each surgical category is given a minimum MERV rating that it must comply with.

== HEPA filter ==
- High-efficiency particulate air (HEPA) filter is at least 99.97% effective in removing particles ≥0.3 μm in diameter (as a reference, Aspergillus spores are 2.5–3.0 μm in diameter).
- High-level HEPA filtration and increasing air changes per hour (ACH) can reduce particulate matter (PM) and bacterial concentrations in the operating room.
- The Facility Guidelines Institute recommends using sequential HEPA filters for ORs with a MERV rating of 7 (i.e., captures particle 10 to 3 μm in size) and 14 (i.e., captures particles from 1 to 0.3 μm in size).
- One mechanism by which HEPA filters capture particles is electrostatic charge. Negatively charged particles are attracted to and get trapped by positively charged fibers in the filter.

== Standards ==
Air filtration standards differ between the U.S. and other countries. The American ASHRAE rating system does not account for changes in filtration efficiency due to electrostatic charge. These MERV ratings do not account for a decrease in efficiency over the first few weeks of use due to a drop in static charge. The air filtration rating system from the International Standardization Organization (ISO) does account for this loss in filtration efficiency.

== Laminar Airflow Ventilation ==
Laminar airflow ventilation consists of air flowing a single direction, as opposed to turbulent ventilation. Current research shows mixed results as whether laminar airflow in an operating room decreases surgical site infections. Laminar airflow ventilation is more frequently used in operating rooms in Europe and is considered best practice for operating rooms to prevent surgical site infections. The Centers for Disease Control and Prevention (CDC) in the United States does not find the use of laminar airflow in operating rooms beneficial.
