= El Llano–Cartí road =

Highway in Panama

Coordinates: 9°13′27.1″N 78°57′57.4″W

Route information
- Length: 30 km (19 mi)

Major junctions
- From: El Llano, Panama
- To: Cartí, Panama

Location
- Country: Panama

Highway system
- Transport in Panama

The 30-kilometer road between El Llano and Cartí, Panama provides the only land access to the Guna Yala area. It was completed in 2009, and paved in 2011. The road is usable all year round. Some inclines are very steep, for which a four-wheel drive vehicle is recommended. The road has nonetheless encouraged encroachment onto Guna land in Guna Yala. The road runs through a 100,000-hectare forest reserve called Área Silvestre de Narganá, which contains an abandoned Guna ecolodge and borders the Burbayar Lodge ecolodge. Some hikers hike the length of the road, often staying at Burbayar Lodge en route.
