= Chitin deacetylase =

Class of enzymes

Identifiers
- EC no.: 3.5.1.41
- CAS no.: 56379-60-3

Databases
- BRENDA: enzyme data
- ExPASy: NiceZyme view
- KEGG: enzyme entry
- MetaCyc: metabolic pathway
- Rhea: reactions
- PDB structures: RCSB PDB PDBe PDBsum
- Gene Ontology: AmiGO / QuickGO
Search
- PMC: articles
- PubMed: articles
- NCBI: proteins

Chitin deacetylase (EC 3.5.1.41) is an enzyme characterised from Mucor rouxii that catalyzes a chemical reaction which hydrolyses the amide bonds in the polymer, chitin, to give chitosan:

chitin
2 H_{2}O
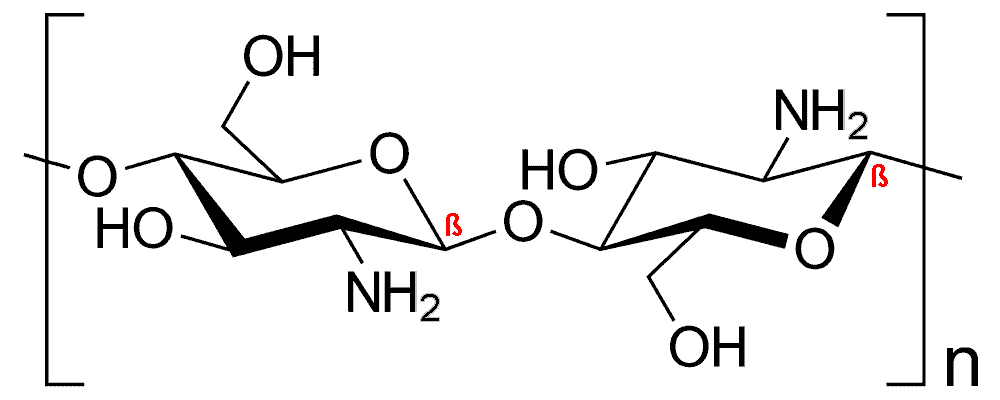
chitosan
+ 2 CH_{3}COOH

The enzyme is found in a wide range of organisms including bacteria, fungi, insects, and crustaceans. It has been studied as a means to produce chitosan, a biocompatible polymer for medical applications, and for processing waste from the industrial production of fish products.

This enzyme is a hydrolase, one acting on carbon-nitrogen bonds other than peptide bonds, specifically in linear amides. The systematic name of this enzyme class is chitin amidohydrolase.

== Structural studies ==
As of late 2007, only one structure has been solved for this class of enzymes, with the PDB accession code PDB: 2IW0.
