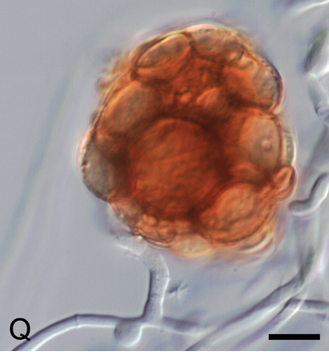
- Bulbil of Microthecium sepedonioides; scale bar: 10 μm

Scientific classification
- Kingdom: Fungi
- Division: Ascomycota
- Class: Sordariomycetes
- Order: Coronophorales
- Family: Ceratostomataceae
- Genus: Microthecium; Corda (1842)

Type species
- Microthecium zobelii Corda (1842)

Species
- See text

= Microthecium =

Genus of fungi

Microthecium is a genus of ascomycete fungi in the family Ceratostomataceae. It has 27 species.

== Description ==
Microthecium produces small, nearly spherical perithecia (fruiting bodies) that may be superficial or partly immersed in the substrate. Unlike the closely related Melanospora, the perithecia in Microthecium lack an ostiole (a visible opening), and also lack the specialised hairs that often surround the ostiole in ostiolate relatives. The perithecial wall is pale (yellow to light yellowish brown) and membranaceous, often appearing darker as the spore mass develops. The asci are typically eight-spored but short-lived, breaking down at maturity so the ascospores accumulate as a dark mass in the cavity. The ascospores are single-celled and dark-coloured at maturity, commonly lemon-shaped (though sometimes ellipsoid or fusiform), and their walls range from smooth to distinctly reticulate (net-like) depending on species. When present, the asexual stage consists of phialides producing small, hyaline (colourless) phialospores, and chlamydospores may also occur. Species of Microthecium are usually parasitic or commensal on other fungi, but some have been recovered from soil.

== Species ==
As of January 2026, Species Fungorum (in the Catalogue of Life) accepts 27 species of Microthecium.

- Microthecium africanum (J.C.Krug) Y.Marín, Stchigel, Guarro & Cano (2018)
- Microthecium argentinense (Speg.) Höhn. (1914)
- Microthecium brevirostratum (Moreau) Y.Marín, Stchigel, Guarro & Cano (2018)
- Microthecium brevirostre (Fuckel) Y.Marín, Stchigel, Guarro & Cano (2018)
- Microthecium fayodii (Vuill.) Y.Marín, Stchigel, Guarro & Cano (2018)
- Microthecium fimbriatum (Rostr.) Y.Marín, Stchigel, Guarro & Cano (2018)
- Microthecium fimicola (E.C.Hansen) Y.Marín, Stchigel, Guarro & Cano (2018)
- Microthecium fusisporum (Petch) Y.Marín, Stchigel, Guarro & Cano (2018)
- Microthecium geoporae (W.Oberm.) Höhn. (1914)
- Microthecium inferius (Udagawa & Cain) D.W.Li, R.F.Castañeda & N.P.Schultes (2020)
- Microthecium internum (Tehon & G.L.Stout) Y.Marín, Stchigel, Guarro & Cano (2018)
- Microthecium japonicum (Y.Horie, Udagawa & P.F.Cannon) Y.Marín, Stchigel, Guarro & Cano (2018)
- Microthecium lenticulare (Udagawa & T.Muroi) Y.Marín, Stchigel, Guarro & Cano (2018)
- Microthecium levitum Udagawa & Cain (1970)
- Microthecium marchicum (Lindau) Y.Marín, Stchigel, Guarro & Cano (2018)
- Microthecium masonii (Kirschst.) Y.Marín, Stchigel, Guarro & Cano (2018)
- Microthecium micropertusum (Y.Horie, Udagawa & P.F.Cannon) Y.Marín, Stchigel, Guarro & Cano (2018)
- Microthecium moreaui (P.F.Cannon & D.Hawksw.) Y.Marín, Stchigel, Guarro & Cano (2018)
- Microthecium nectrioides (Marchal) Y.Marín, Stchigel, Guarro & Cano (2018)
- Microthecium pegleri (D.Hawksw. & A.Henrici) Y.Marín, Stchigel, Guarro & Cano (2018)
- Microthecium phoenicis Maire (1917)
- Microthecium quadrangulare (Dania García, Stchigel & Guarro) Y.Marín, Stchigel, Guarro & Cano (2018)
- Microthecium ramosii Syd. & P.Syd. (1917)
- Microthecium ryvardenianum Aramb. & Gamundí (1985)
- Microthecium sepedonioides (Preuss) Y.Marín, Stchigel, Guarro & Cano (2018)
- Microthecium tenuissimum (Dania García, Stchigel & Guarro) Y.Marín, Stchigel, Guarro & Cano (2018)
- Microthecium zobelii Corda (1842)
