= Triangularia =

Scientific classification
- Domain: Eukaryota
- Kingdom: Fungi
- Division: Ascomycota
- Class: Sordariomycetes
- Order: Sordariales
- Family: Podosporaceae
- Genus: Triangularia; Boedijn (1934)

Type species
- Triangularia bambusae (J.F.H.Beyma) Boedijn (1934)

Genus of fungi in the family Podosporaceae

Triangularia is a genus of fungi in the family Podosporaceae.

== Species ==
- Triangularia allahabadensis (M.P.Srivast., Tandon, Bhargava & A.K.Ghosh) X.Wei Wang & Houbraken
- Triangularia angulispora Cain & Farrow
- Triangularia anserina (Rabenh.) X.Wei Wang & Houbraken
- Triangularia backusii L.H.Huang
- Triangularia bambusae (J.F.H.Beyma) Boedijn
- Triangularia batistae J.L.Bezerra & Maciel
- Triangularia bellae-mahoneyi (C.Boucher, T.S.Nguyen & Silar) X.Wei Wang & Houbraken
- Triangularia comata (Milovtz.) X.Wei Wang & Houbraken
- Triangularia longicaudata (Cain) X.Wei Wang & Houbraken
- Triangularia macrospora Rikhy & Mukerji
- Triangularia mangenotii Arx & Hennebert
- Triangularia matsushimae (Udagawa & Furuya) Guarro
- Triangularia pauciseta (Ces.) X.Wei Wang & Houbraken
- Triangularia phialophoroides (Mouch. & W.Gams) X.Wei Wang & Houbraken
- Triangularia pseudoanserina (C.Boucher, T.S.Nguyen & Silar) X.Wei Wang & Houbraken
- Triangularia pseudocomata (C.Boucher, T.S.Nguyen & Silar) X.Wei Wang & Houbraken
- Triangularia pseudopauciseta (C.Boucher, T.S.Nguyen & Silar) X.Wei Wang & Houbraken
- Triangularia setosa (G.Winter) X.Wei Wang & Houbraken
- Triangularia striatispora Furuya & Udagawa
- Triangularia tanzaniensis R.S.Khan & J.C.Krug
- Triangularia verruculosa (C.N.Jensen) X.Wei Wang & Houbraken
