= Ceratostomataceae =

Scientific classification
- Kingdom: Fungi
- Division: Ascomycota
- Class: Sordariomycetes
- Order: Coronophorales
- Family: Ceratostomataceae; G. Winter

Type genus
- Ceratostoma Fr.

Genera
- See text

Family of fungi

The Ceratostomataceae are a family of fungi in the phylum Ascomycota, class Sordariomycetes, subclass Hypocreomycetidae and order Coronophorales.

Species in the family have a widespread distribution, and are found growing on other fungi, on soil, or on rotting vegetation. The family may not be monophyletic as currently defined.

== Genera ==
As accepted by Wijayawardene et al. 2020;

- Arxiomyces P.F. Cannon & D. Hawksw. (3 species)
- Dactylidispora Y. Marín, Stchigel, Guarro & Cano (3)
- Echinusitheca Y. Marín, Stchigel, Dania García, Guarro, A.N. Mill. & Cano (1)
- Erythrocarpon Zukal (1)
- Gonatobotrys Corda (ca. 10)
- Harzia Costantin (10)
- Melanospora Corda (69)
- Microthecium Corda (ca. 20) (formerly Pteridiosperma J.C. Krug & Jeng
- Neotrotteria Sacc. (1)
- Pseudomicrothecium Y. Marín, Stchigel, Guarro & Cano (1)
- Pustulipora P.F. Cannon (1)
- Rhytidospora Jeng & Cain (5)
- Scopinella Lév. (9)
- Setiferotheca Matsush. (1)
- Syspastospora P.F. Cannon & D. Hawksw. (4)
- Vittatispora P. Chaudhary, J. Campb., D. Hawksw. & K.N. Sastry (1)
