= List of Tuber (fungus) species =

This is a list of the species in the fungal genus Tuber.

== List ==
| Name | Authority | Year | Distribution | Phylogroup |
|---|---|---|---|---|
| Tuber aestivum | (Wulfen) Pers. | 1801 | Europe, from Spain to eastern Europe and from Sweden to North Africa | Aestivum |
| Tuber affine | Corda | 1854 | | |
| Tuber albidum | Fr. | 1823 | | |
| Tuber album | Bull. | 1789 | | |
| Tuber anniae | W.Colgan & Trappe | 1997 | United States Pacific Northwest, Mexico, Baltic rim | Puberulum |
| Tuber arenaria | Moris | 1829 | | |
| Tuber argenteum | Gilkey | 1916 | | |
| Tuber argentinum | Speg. | 1909 | | |
| Tuber asa-foetida | Lesp. | 1889 | | |
| Tuber atrorubens | (Wallr.) Tul. | 1851 | | |
| Tuber australe | Speg. | 1880 | | |
| Tuber bellisporum | G.Bonito & Trappe | 2010 | | Gibbosum |
| Tuber belonei | Quél. | 1888 | | |
| Tuber berkeleyanum | (Corda) Tul. | 1851 | | |
| Tuber bernardinii | Gori | 2003 | | |
| Tuber besseyi | Gilkey | 1939 | | |
| Tuber beyerlei | Trappe, Bonito & Guevara | 2012 | Oregon, USA | |
| Tuber bisporum | Gilkey | 1925 | | |
| Tuber bituminatum | Berk. & Broome | 1851 | | |
| Tuber blotii | Eudes-Desl. | | | |
| Tuber bomiense | K.M.Su & W.P.Xiong | 2013 | Tibet | |
| Tuber bonnetii | Roum. | 1882 | | |
| Tuber borchianum | Zobel | 1854 | | |
| Tuber borchii | Vittad. | 1831 | | |
| Tuber brennemanii | A.Grupe, Healy & M.E.Sm. | 2018 | | |
| Tuber brumale | Vittad. | 1831 | Southern Europe | |
| Tuber californicum | Harkn. | 1899 | | |
| Tuber canaliculatum | Gilkey | 1920 | | |
| Tuber candidum | Harkn. | 1899 | | |
| Tuber canirevelatum | A. Sow, L. Martin & B. Lemmond | 2024 | | |
| Tuber caroli | H.Bonnet | 1885 | | |
| Tuber castaneum | (Wallr.) Corda | 1854 | | |
| Tuber castellanoi | G.Bonito & Trappe | 2010 | | |
| Tuber castilloi | Guevara, Bonito & Trappe | 2012 | Mexico | |
| Tuber cervinum | (L.) Nees | 1817 | | |
| Tuber cibarium | With. | 1792 | | |
| Tuber cinereum | Tul. | | | |
| Tuber cistophilum | P.Alvarado, G.Moreno, J.L.Manjón, C.Gelpi & J.Muñoz | 2012 | Spain | |
| Tuber citrinum | Harkn. | 1899 | | |
| Tuber clarei | Gilkey | 1963 | | |
| Tuber croci | Dubois | 1803 | | |
| Tuber culinare | Zobel | 1854 | | |
| Tuber culinare | Zobel | 1854 | | |
| Tuber cumberlandense | A. Sow, L. Martin & B. Lemmond | 2024 | | |
| Tuber debaryanum | R.Hesse | 1891 | | |
| Tuber donnagotto | Božac, Širić & Kos | 2012 | Croatia | |
| Tuber dryophilum | Tul. & C.Tul. | 1844 | | |
| Tuber echinatum | Sacc. & Paol. | 1888 | | |
| Tuber eisenii | Harkn. | 1899 | | |
| Tuber esculentum | Sacc. | 1889 | | |
| Tuber excavatum | Vittad. | 1831 | | |
| Tuber excelsum-reticulatum | L. Fan & T. Li (MB #842427) | 2022 | Asia :: East Asia :: China :: N China :: Shanxi | Maculatum |
| Tuber exiguum | R.Hesse | 1891 | | |
| Tuber ferrugineum | Vittad. | 1831 | | |
| Tuber filamentosum | (Wallr.) Tul. | 1851 | | |
| Tuber floridanum | A.Grupe, Sulzbacher & M.E.Sm. | 2018 | | |
| Tuber foetidum | Vittad. | 1831 | | |
| Tuber fulgens | Quél. | 1880 | | |
| Tuber furfuraceum | H.T.Hu & Y.I.Wang | 2005 | | |
| Tuber fuscum | (Wallr.) Corda | 1837 | | |
| Tuber gallicum | Corda | 1854 | | |
| Tuber gardneri | Gilkey | 1916 | | |
| Tuber gibbosum | Harkn. | 1899 | Pacific Northwest region of the United States | |
| Tuber giganteum | Gilkey | 1925 | | |
| Tuber gigantosporum | Y.Wang & Z.P.Li | 1991 | | |
| Tuber griseum | Borch ex Pers. | 1801 | | |
| Tuber guevarai | Bonito & Trappe | 2012 | Mexico | |
| Tuber gulonum | (Corda) Paol. | 1889 | | |
| Tuber gulosorum | (Scop.) F.H.Wigg. | 1780 | | |
| Tuber guzmanii | Trappe & Cázares | 2006 | | |
| Tuber harknessii | Gilkey | 1954 | | |
| Tuber hiemalbum | Chatin | 1892 | | |
| Tuber himalayense | B.C.Zhang & Minter | 1988 | | |
| Tuber hiromichii | (S.Imai) Trappe | 1979 | | |
| Tuber huidongense | Y.Wang | 2002 | | |
| Tuber huizeanum | L.Fan & C.L.Hou | 2011 | China | |
| Tuber huiliense | L.Fan & C.L.Hou | 2022 | China | Latisporum |
| Tuber incognitum | Piña Páez, Bonito, G. Guevara & Castellano 2018 | 2018 | Mexico | |
| Tuber indicum | Cooke & Massee | 1895 | | |
| Tuber intermedium | Bucholtz | 1901 | | |
| Tuber irradians | Gilkey | 1916 | | |
| Tuber lacunosum | Mattir. | 1900 | | |
| Tuber lannaense | S.Lumyong | 2016 | Chiang Mai, Thailand | |
| Tuber lapideum | Mattir. | 1887 | | |
| Tuber latisporum | Juan Chen & P.G.Liu | 2007 | | |
| Tuber lauryi | Trappe, Bonito & Guevara | 2012 | Oregon, USA | |
| Tuber lespiaultii | (Corda) Tul. | 1851 | | |
| Tuber levissimum | Gilkey | 1916 | | |
| Tuber liaotongense | Y.Wang | 1990 | | |
| Tuber lignarium | (Harkn.) Gilkey | 1916 | | |
| Tuber lijiangense | L.Fan & J.Z.Cao | 2011 | China | |
| Tuber linsdalei | Gilkey | 1954 | | |
| Tuber liui | A S.Xu | 1999 | | |
| Tuber longisporum | Gilkey | 1925 | | |
| Tuber lucidum | Vittad. | 1884 | | |
| Tuber lucidum | H.Bonnet | 1884 | | |
| Tuber lutescens | Lázaro Ibiza | 1908 | | |
| Tuber luteum | Regel | 1888 | | |
| Tuber lyonii | Butters | 1903 | northern Mexico states of Nuevo Leon and Tamaulipas into Québec, Canada | |
| Tuber macrosporum | Vittad. | 1831 | | |
| Tuber maculatum | Vittad. | 1831 | | |
| Tuber magnatum | Picco | 1788 | Piedmont region in northern Italy | |
| Tuber malacodermum | E.Fisch. | 1923 | | |
| Tuber malenconii | Donadini, Riousset, G.Riousset & G.Chev. | 1979 | | |
| Tuber maresa | Font Quer | 1931 | | |
| Tuber melanosporum | Vittad. | 1831 | Spain, France, and Italy | |
| Tuber mesentericum | Vittad. | 1831 | | |
| Tuber mexiusanum | Guevara, Bonito & Cázares. | 2012 | Mexico, USA | |
| Tuber michailowskianum | Bucholtz | 1908 | | |
| Tuber microspermum | L.Fan & Y.Li | 2012 | China | |
| Tuber microsphaerosporum | L.Fan & Y.Li | 2012 | China | |
| Tuber microspiculatum | L.Fan & Yu Li | 2012 | China | |
| Tuber microsporum | Vittad. | 1831 | Mexico | |
| Tuber microverrucosum | L.Fan & C.L.Hou | 2011 | China | |
| Tuber minimum | Bornh. | 1889 | | |
| Tuber miquihuanense | Guevara, Bonito & Cázares | 2012 | | |
| Tuber mixtum | Risso | 1889 | | |
| Tuber monosporum | (Mattir.) Vizzini | 2008 | | |
| Tuber montagnei | Zobel | 1854 | | |
| Tuber montanum | Chatin | 1892 | | |
| Tuber monticola | Harkn. | 1899 | | |
| Tuber moravicum | Velen. | 1947 | | |
| Tuber moretii | Maire | 1926 | | |
| Tuber moschatum | Bull. | 1790 | | |
| Tuber mougeotii | Quél. | 1881 | | |
| Tuber multimaculatum | Parladé, Trappe & I.F.Alvarez | 1993 | | |
| Tuber murinum | R.Hesse | 1891 | | |
| Tuber mutabile | Quél. | 1881 | | |
| Tuber nigrum | Bull. | 1788 | | |
| Tuber nitidum | Vittad. | 1831 | | |
| Tuber niveum | Desf. | 1799 | | |
| Tuber nuciforme | Corda | 1854 | | |
| Tuber obtextum | Spreng. | 1815 | | |
| Tuber occidentale | Corda | 1854 | | |
| Tuber oligospermum | (Tul. & C.Tul.) Trappe | 1979 | | |
| Tuber oligosporum | Vittad. | 1831 | | |
| Tuber olivaceum | Harkn. | 1899 | | |
| Tuber oregonense | Trappe, Bonito & P.Rawl. | 2010 | Washington, south to southwestern Oregon | |
| Tuber pacificum | Trappe, Castellano & Bushnell | 2000 | | |
| Tuber pallidum | Lázaro Ibiza | 1908 | | |
| Tuber panniferum | Tul. | 1851 | | |
| Tuber panzhihuanense | X.J.Deng & Y.Wang | 2012 | China | |
| Tuber petrophilum | Milenković, P.Jovan., Grebenc, Ivančević & Marković | 2016 | Serbia | |
| Tuber phlebodermum | (Gilkey) Trappe | 1979 | | |
| Tuber piperatum | H.Bonnet | 1884 | | |
| Tuber polyspermum | L.Fan & C.L.Hou | 2011 | China | |
| Tuber pseudoexcavatum | Y.Wang, G.Moreno, Riousset, Manjón & G.Riousset | 1998 | | |
| Tuber pseudohimalayense | G.Moreno, Manjón, J.Díez & García-Mont. | 1997 | | |
| Tuber puberulum | Berk. & Broome | 1846 | | |
| Tuber pulchrosporum | Konstantin., Tsampazis, Slavova, Nakkas, Polemis, Fryssouli & Zervakis 2019 | 2019 | Mexico | |
| Tuber queletianum | Bataille | 1921 | | |
| Tuber quercicola | J.L.Frank, D.Southworth & Trappe | 2006 | | |
| Tuber rapaeodorum | Tul. & C.Tul. | 1843 | | |
| Tuber regianum | Montecchi & Lazzari | 1987 | | |
| Tuber regimontanum | Guevara, Bonito & Julio Rodríguez | 2008 | | |
| Tuber renati | H.Bonnet | 1884 | | |
| Tuber requienii | Tul. | 1843 | | |
| Tuber rhenanum | Fuckel | 1870 | | |
| Tuber rufum | Pollini | 1816 | | |
| Tuber rutilum | R.Hesse | 1891 | | |
| Tuber scleroneuron | Berk. & Broome | 1851 | | |
| Tuber scruposum | R.Hesse | 1891 | | |
| Tuber separans | Gilkey | 1916 | | |
| Tuber shearii | Harkn. | 1920 | | |
| Tuber sinense | X.L.Mao | 2000 | | |
| Tuber sinoaestivum | J.P.Zhang & P.G.Liu | 2012 | China | |
| Tuber sinoalbidum | L.Fan & J.Z.Cao | 2011 | China | |
| Tuber sinoexcavatum | L.Fan & Yu Li | 2011 | China | |
| Tuber sinuosum | Lázaro Ibiza | 1908 | | |
| Tuber solidum | With. | 1792 | | |
| Tuber sphaerospermum | (Malençon) P.Roux, Guy Garcia & M.C.Roux | 2006 | | |
| Tuber sphaerosporum | Gilkey | 1939 | | |
| Tuber spinoreticulatum | Uecker & Burds. | 1977 | | |
| Tuber suecicum | Wittr. | 1889 | | |
| Tuber taiyuanense | B.Liu | 1985 | | |
| Tuber texense | Heimsch | 1959 | | |
| Tuber thailandicum | S.Lumyong | 2015 | Chiang Mai, Thailand | |
| Tuber umbilicatum | Juan Chen & P.G.Liu | 2006 | | |
| Tuber uncinatum | Chatin | 1892 | | |
| Tuber unicolor | Gilkey | 1920 | | |
| Tuber vacini | Velen. | 1947 | | |
| Tuber venturii | (Corda) Tul. | 1851 | | |
| Tuber verii | Pacioni & Lalli | 1989 | | |
| Tuber virens | Alb. & Schwein. | 1805 | | |
| Tuber virens | Schwein. | 1822 | | |
| Tuber walkeri | Healy, Bonito & Guevara | 2012 | Iowa, USA | |
| Tuber whetstonense | J.L.Frank, D.Southworth & Trappe | 2006 | | |
| Tuber xizangense | A S.Xu | 1999 | | |
| Tuber zeylanicum | Berk. & Broome | 1875 | | |
| Tuber zhongdianense | X.Y.He, Hai M.Li & Y.Wang | 2004 | | |
