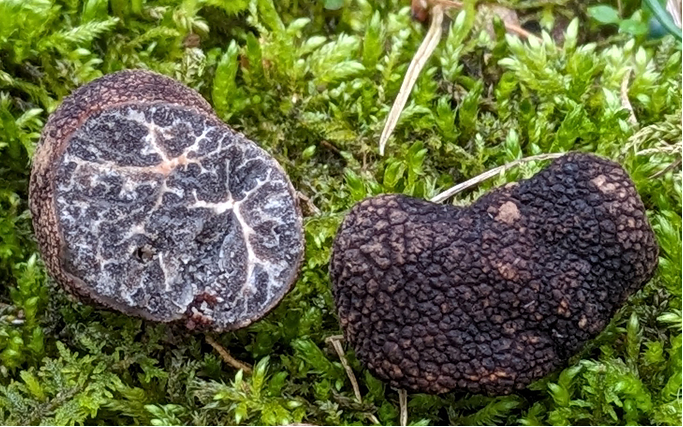

Scientific classification
- Kingdom: Fungi
- Division: Ascomycota
- Class: Pezizomycetes
- Order: Pezizales
- Family: Tuberaceae
- Genus: Tuber
- Species: T. canirevelatum

Binomial name
- Tuber canirevelatum Sow, L.Martin & Lemmond

= Tuber canirevelatum =

Species of fungus

Tuber canirevelatum is an edible truffle species discovered in 2024 in Tennessee in the United States by Lois Martin and her truffle dog Monza. This species is extremely rare and has only been found in Tennessee. Tuber canirevelatum was named in honor of truffle dogs because they have been essential tools in the cultivation and collection of truffles. The species name 'canirevelatum' is a conjunction of the latin words 'canis' which means "dog", and 'revelatum' which means "to reveal".

== Description ==
Tuber canirevelatum ascomata, or truffles, are black to dark brown, ovoid, extremely warty, and 1–2 cm (0.4–0.8 in) in diameter. The gleba, or spore containing tissue, of these truffles is light to dark gray and interspersed with sterile white veins. Tuber canirevelatum asci are globose to ovoid, 84–108 × 69–89 μm, and contain 1-3 ascospores. The ascospores are a dark raw umber color, subglobose, spiny, with reticulate alveolate, or honeycomb-like, ornamentation. The ascospores appear spiny when observed under a light microscope because the alveolate meshes forms U-shaped valleys and are thickest where several meshes meet.

== Aroma ==
The aroma of Tuber canirevelatum is described as pungent and similar to garlic or cilantro. Tuber canirevelatum truffles share some aromatic compounds found in well-known prized truffles, suggesting to the authors that the truffle could have commercial value. For instance, dimethyl sulfide was detected in Tuber canirevelatum ascomata and is also found in the black winter truffle (T. melanosporum), summer truffle (T. aestivum), and the white truffle (T. magnatum).

== Taxonomy ==
Tuber canirevelatum is a member of the Macrosporum clade which contains a North American species, Tuber canaliculatum, a European species, Tuber macrosporum, and several Asian species such as T. tomentosum. and T. calosporum. T. canirevelatum can be easily distinguished from its only North American relative, T. canaliculatum, by its lack of a red peridium.
