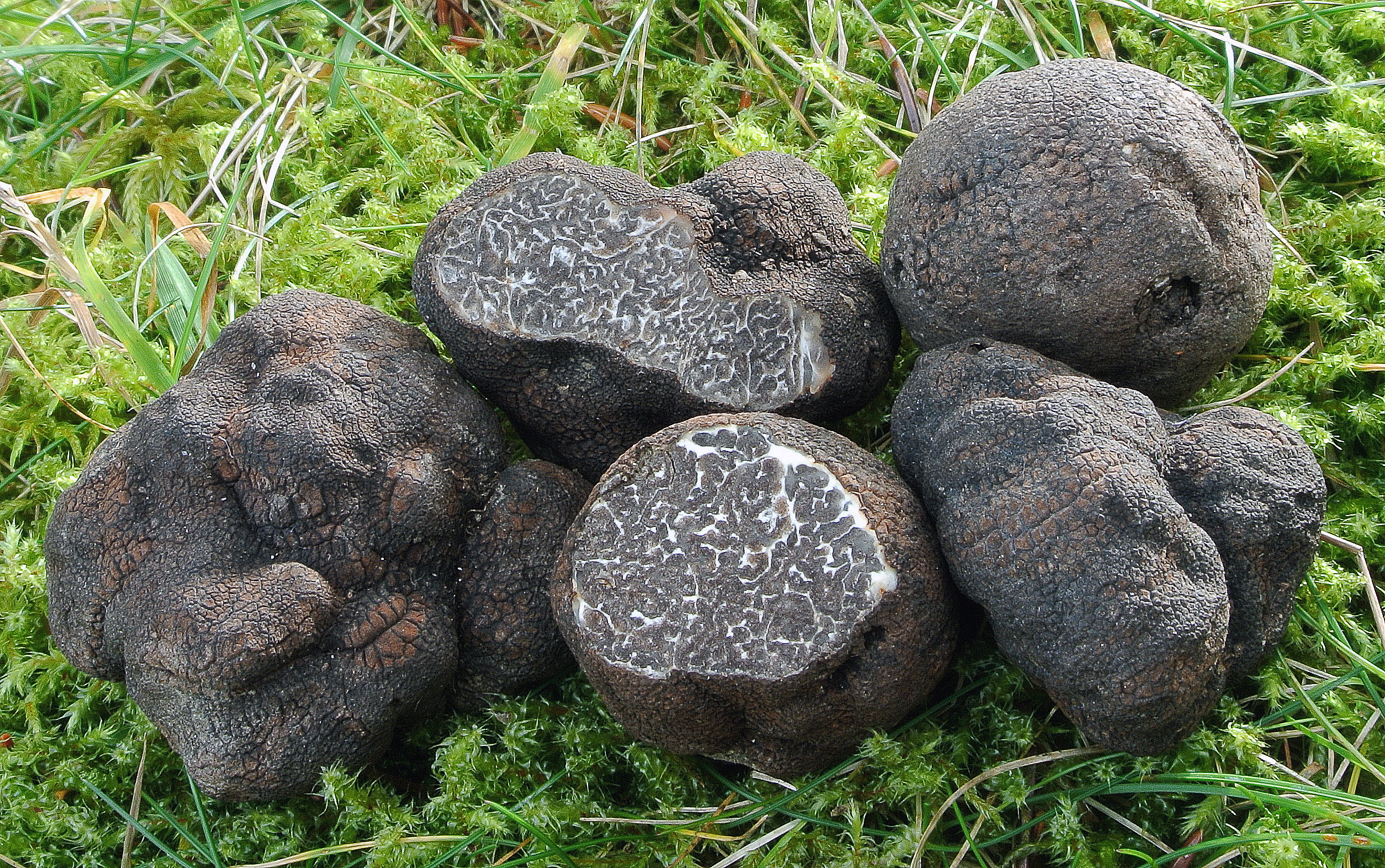

Scientific classification
- Kingdom: Fungi
- Division: Ascomycota
- Class: Pezizomycetes
- Order: Pezizales
- Family: Tuberaceae
- Genus: Tuber
- Species: T. macrosporum

Binomial name
- Tuber macrosporum Vittad. (1831)

= Tuber macrosporum =

Species of truffle fungus

Tuber macrosporum, commonly known as the smooth black truffle, is a species of truffle in the family Tuberaceae. The fungus produces blackish, irregularly shaped underground fruiting bodies measuring 2–5 cm in diameter with a grey-brown to purple-brown interior marked by thick white veins and has an intense garlic-like odour similar to the Italian white truffle. It is distinguished microscopically by its exceptionally large ellipsoid spores (measuring 40–80 × 30–60 micrometres) adorned with a distinctive mesh-like pattern. The species has a patchy distribution across Europe, where it forms beneficial relationships with various trees including oaks, hazels, hornbeams, willows, lindens, beech and poplars, preferring moist, well-aerated soils from slightly acidic to alkaline in plains and foothills.

== Taxonomy ==
Tuber macrosporum was described as new to science by Italian mycologist Carlo Vittadini in 1831, and remains the accepted name in Index Fungorum. Molecular phylogenetics studies based on the internal transcribed spacer (ITS) and large subunit (LSU) regions of nuclear ribosomal DNA place it in the Macrosporum clade, a lineage that also includes the North American species Tuber canaliculatum. Within T. macrosporum, there are two well-supported subclades that correspond broadly to Italian versus Central and Eastern European specimens, suggesting some geographic genetic structuring.

== Description ==
The ascomata (fruiting bodies) of T. macrosporum are generally 2–5 centimetres (3/4–2 in) in diameter, occasionally reaching larger sizes. They may be irregularly lobed or nearly round (subglobose), with a blackish peridium bearing scattered, very short flat warts that are reddish-brown when fresh. On sectioning, the gleba (internal tissue) ranges from grey-brown to lilac or purple-brown at maturity, marked by thick, white, winding veins. Maturation occurs from August through December, peaking in autumn. Microscopically, the asci are typically three-spored (rarely one or up to four) and measure about 90–120 × 60–80 μm. The spores are ellipsoid, exceptionally large for truffles (about 40–80 × 30–60 μm), and bear a dense reticulate-alveolate ornamentation of closed polygonal meshes about 2–4 μm high. The ascomata have an intense garlic-like odour similar to Tuber magnatum (Italian white truffle).

== Habitat and distribution ==
Tuber macrosporum has a wide but patchy distribution across Europe. It is common in Serbia, Hungary and Romania, less frequent in Italy, and rare in France and Great Britain, with additional reports from Switzerland, Germany, Ukraine, Croatia, Slovenia, Slovakia, Poland and Turkey. Fruiting bodies have been found as early as June but are most often encountered from September to December. The species favours plain sites through foothills to low mountains, especially on north-facing slopes, floodplains or other moist microhabitats. It grows in soils ranging from slightly acidic to alkaline (pH 5.7–8.2), including chernozems, luvisols, planosols and rendzic leptosols, but requires good aeration and consistent moisture—often aided by subsurface water or periodic flooding. Soil textures are typically clay loam, loam or sandy loam, and compacted horizons with gleysols and iron precipitates are common. T. macrosporum forms ectomycorrhizas with a variety of hosts, most frequently oaks (Quercus pubescens, Q. robur, Q. petraea, Q. cerris), hazel (Corylus avellana), hornbeams (Ostrya carpinifolia, Carpinus betulus), willows (Salix spp.), lindens (Tilia spp.), beech (Fagus sylvatica) and poplars (Populus spp.).

== See also ==
- List of Tuber species
