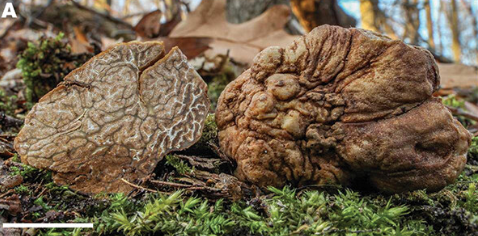

Scientific classification
- Kingdom: Fungi
- Division: Ascomycota
- Class: Pezizomycetes
- Order: Pezizales
- Family: Tuberaceae
- Genus: Tuber
- Species: T. cumberlandense

Binomial name
- Tuber cumberlandense A. Sow, L. Martin & Lemmond

= Tuber cumberlandense =

Species of fungi

Tuber cumberlandense, previously referred to as Tuber sp. 66, is an edible fungi species of the genus Tuber.

Tuber cumberlandense was named after the Cumberland Plateau in Kentucky and Tennessee where it was found by Margaret Townsend, Lois Martin and Lois' truffle dog, a Lagotto Romagnolo named Monza in January of 2018. T. cumberlandense is endemic to eastern North America, where it has been harvested in truffle orchards and woodlands dominated by broadleaf trees. Currently, efforts are underway in Kentucky to cultivate this native truffle on white oak by the whiskey company Maker's Mark.

== Description ==
Tuber cumberlandense is described as pale-maize to buff-yellow in color, the peridium is 160–340 μm thick and has a lumpy, round to ovoid shape, with irregular lobes and a highly ridged, wrinkled surface, lacking warts. The peridium is composed of two layers, an ectal excipulum 103–217 μm thick composed of structural hyaline and a medullary excipulum 71–236 μm thick composed of interwoven hyaline hyphae. They are approximately 1–5 cm in diameter and weigh 0.50–30 grams.

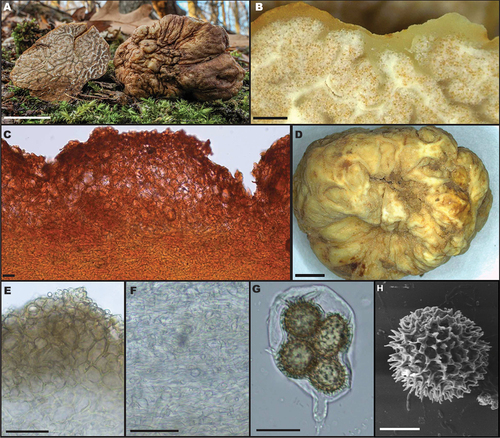
Tuber cumberlandense, sp. nov. A. Ascoma and gleba. B. Gleba and peridium. C. Peridium stained with Congo red, composed of an ectal excipulum (layer of inflated cells) and medullary excipulum (layer of interwoven hyphae). D. Ascoma. E. Ectal excipulum composed of large swollen cells. F. Medullary excipulum composed of interwoven hyphae and small swollen cells. G. Ascus with the most common number of ascospores. H. Ascospore. Bars: A = 10 mm; B = 1 mm; C = 20 μm; D = 5 mm; F = 50 μm; G = 20 μm; H = 10 μm.

The spore-containing portion, the gleba, is light brown to beige when mature, darkening with age or drought, and marbled with white to tan sterile veins. The asci (spore-bearing cells) contain 1-6 spores each, with spores described as short hooked coniform spines, or ovoid to subglobose shaped, connected at their bases, with a size of 27–37 × 24–30 μm.

Taste is described as mild, similar to garlic and radish.

=== Aroma ===
Gas chromatography was used to qualify and characterize the volatiles of T. cumberlandense. Volatile organic compounds (VOCs) are the chemical compounds that create a truffle's aroma.

The diverse volatile profile of T. cumberlandense contained 25 compounds detected above threshold and are described as pungent or strong and is similar to brassicaceous vegetables, such as cabbage, and onions. Notably, T. cumberlandense VOCs contained acetone (fruity), 2-butanone (sharp, sweet), dimethyl sulfide (cabbage, sweet, corn), amyl nitrite (fruity, feet), and 2,4-dithiapentane (commonly used when making synthetic truffle products, aroma of mustard). T. cumberlandense ascomata also had many nitrogen-containing VOCs, including 2-methylbutanenitrile (ammonia), nitromethane (fruity, alcohol), and isobutyronitrile (almonds), which have not been previously identified in Tuber volatiles and may thus serve as biomarkers for T. cumberlandense.

=== Similar species ===
Tuber lyonii is another native species in the Rufum clade with spiny spores, also found in truffle orchards of eastern North America. It shares its light-colored yellow-tan peridium, light brown gleba, and spiny, yellow-brown spores with T. cumberlandense, however it lacks the highly wrinkled peridium and onion-like aroma, and ovoid spores. T. lyonii has a smooth peridium and nutty aroma, with ellipsoid spores. Although small, immature T. cumberlandense ascomata may not appear wrinkled and make it difficult to differentiate between species.

A highly rugose or wrinkled peridium has been previously described in other species within the Rufum clade, such as Tuber rugosum. Both species share a highly rugose peridium, beige to buff gleba, and spiny spores. However, the ascomata of T. cumberlandense lack a cavity that exposes the gleba, which is a common characteristic in T. rugosum ascomata. The aroma of T. rugosum differs from T. cumberlandense by its mild and nutty aroma, ascospores have coniform, hooked spines that are not connected at their bases.

Tuber luomae and Tuber cumberlandense both share pale gleba and spiny ascospores; however, T. luomae ascospores are ellipsoid to broadly ellipsoid. Additionally, T. cumberlandense has only been found in eastern North America, whereas T. luomae has only been collected in western North America (Washington and Oregon, USA).

== Habitat and distribution ==
Fruit bodies of T. cumberlandense grow singly or in groups beneath the soil near White Oak and Hazelnut trees. They are most commonly found in the Cumberland Plateau region (Tennessee, Kentucky, Ohio), and occasionally in truffle orchards managed for Tuber melanosporum production. These truffles thrive in areas with a soil pH around 7.4 and are typically found in forest habitats dominated by White Oak, Hickory, and Hazelnut trees.

== Taxonomy ==
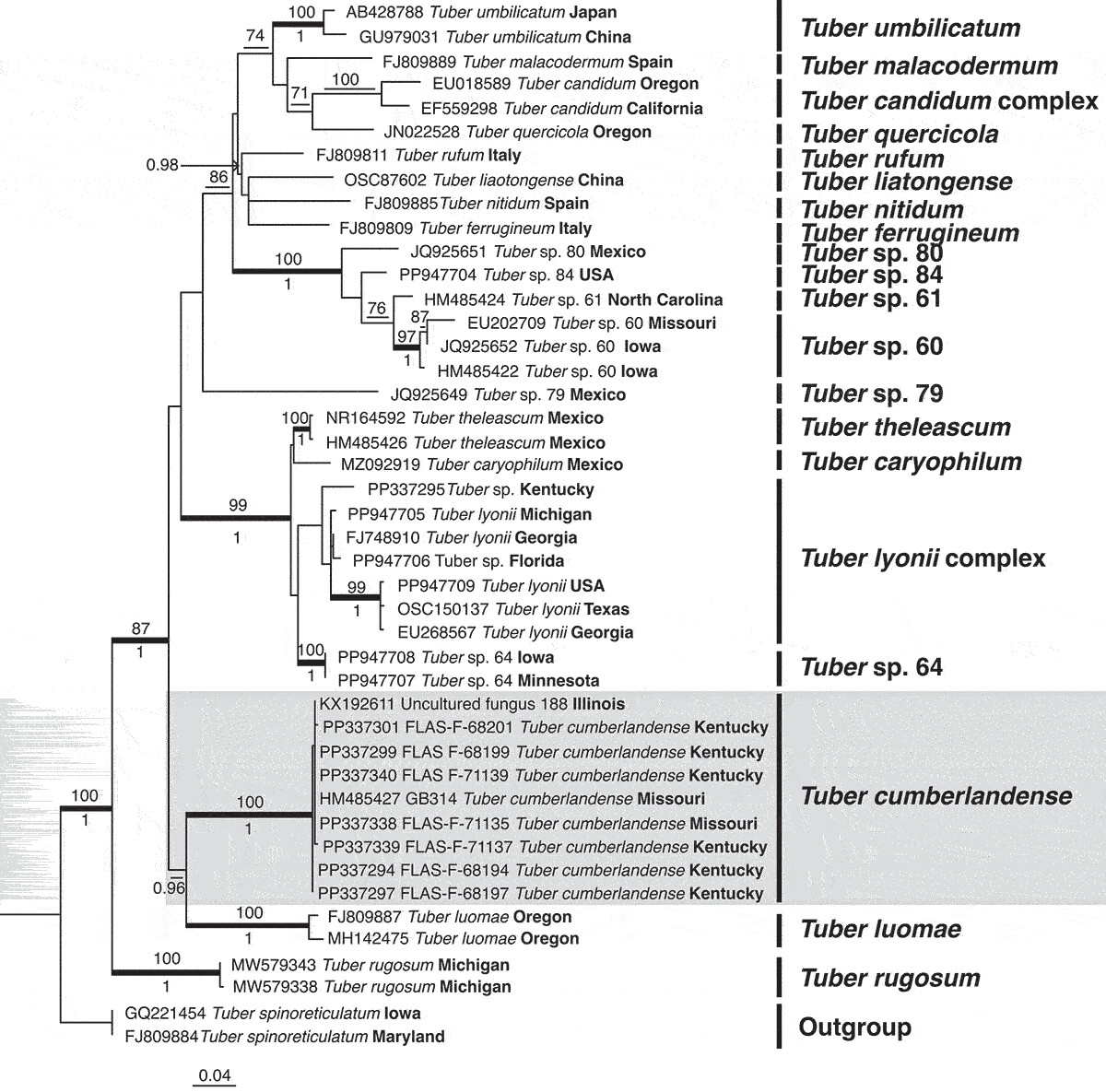
Phylogeny of the Rufum clade based on ITS rDNA shows the phylogenetic placement of Tuber cumberlandense, sp. nov. Branches are labeled with GenBank numbers or collector numbers followed by the country/state collections were made in. This phylogeny was inferred using ML and BI methods. Branches with both ML bootstrap support values >70% and Bayesian probabilities above 0.95 are bold. Bootstrap support values are written above branches, and Bayesian posterior probabilities are written below branches. Branches with support from only one inference model are indicated with a line above (maximum likelihood) or below (Bayesian probability) the branch.

The first description of T. cumberlandense was published in 2024 by lead author, Alassane Sow, an undergraduate research student, in collaboration with Gregory Bonito, associate professor in the Department of Plant, Soil and Microbial Sciences at the Michigan state University College of Agriculture and Natural Resources.

=== Phylogeny ===
Phylogenetic analyses involved PCR amplification of ITS (internal transcribed spacer), tef1 (translation elongation factor 1-alpha), and rpb2 (second largest subunit of RNA polymerase II) sequences, then bidirectional sanger sequencing were used to place T. cumberlandense within a phylogenetic context. Phylogenetic placement of each species was determined through Maximum likelihood (ML) and Bayesian inference (BI) analyses.

Tuber cumberlandense forms a monophyletic group with 100% bootstrap support and a posterior probability of 1 in individual ITS, tef1, and rpb2 and linked ITS+tef1+rpb2 phylogenies. In each phylogeny, T. cumberlandense was placed as sister to T. luomae but without significant bootstrap support (<70%).
