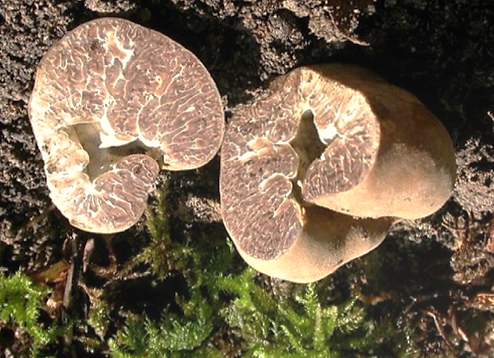

Scientific classification
- Domain: Eukaryota
- Kingdom: Fungi
- Division: Ascomycota
- Class: Pezizomycetes
- Order: Pezizales
- Family: Tuberaceae
- Genus: Tuber
- Species: T. excavatum

Binomial name
- Tuber excavatum Vittad., 1831

Synonyms
- Aschion excavatum (Vittad.) Ricken; Aschion fuscum Wallr; Rhizopogon excavatus (Vittad.) Rabenh.; Tuber excavatum f. globispora Vacek; Tuber excavatum subsp. lapideum (Mattir.) E. Fisch; Tuber excavatum var. brevisporum E. Fisch; Tuber excavatum var. intermedium G. Gross; Tuber excavatum var. longisporum E. Fisch; Tuber excavatum var. sulphureum G. Riousset & Riousset; Tuber lapideum Mattir.; Tuber montagnei Zobel

= Tuber excavatum =

Species of fungus

Tuber excavatum, the hollowed truffle, is a species of truffle in the family Tuberaceae. The species is found in western Europe.
