= Tuber foetidum =

Scientific classification
- Domain: Eukaryota
- Kingdom: Fungi
- Division: Ascomycota
- Class: Pezizomycetes
- Order: Pezizales
- Family: Tuberaceae
- Genus: Tuber
- Species: T. foetidum

Binomial name
- Tuber foetidum Vittad. (1831)

Species of fungus

Tuber foetidum is a species of truffle in the genus Tuber (fungus). It was first described scientifically in 1831 by the Italian doctor and mycologist Carlo Vittadini. It is characterized by its foetid odour, and minute brownish bumps on the surface of the fruitbody. A rare species, it is found in Europe. It associates with oak and beech in southern Europe, and with larch in the United Kingdom. Molecular analysis indicates that T. foetidum is closely related to T. maculatum.
