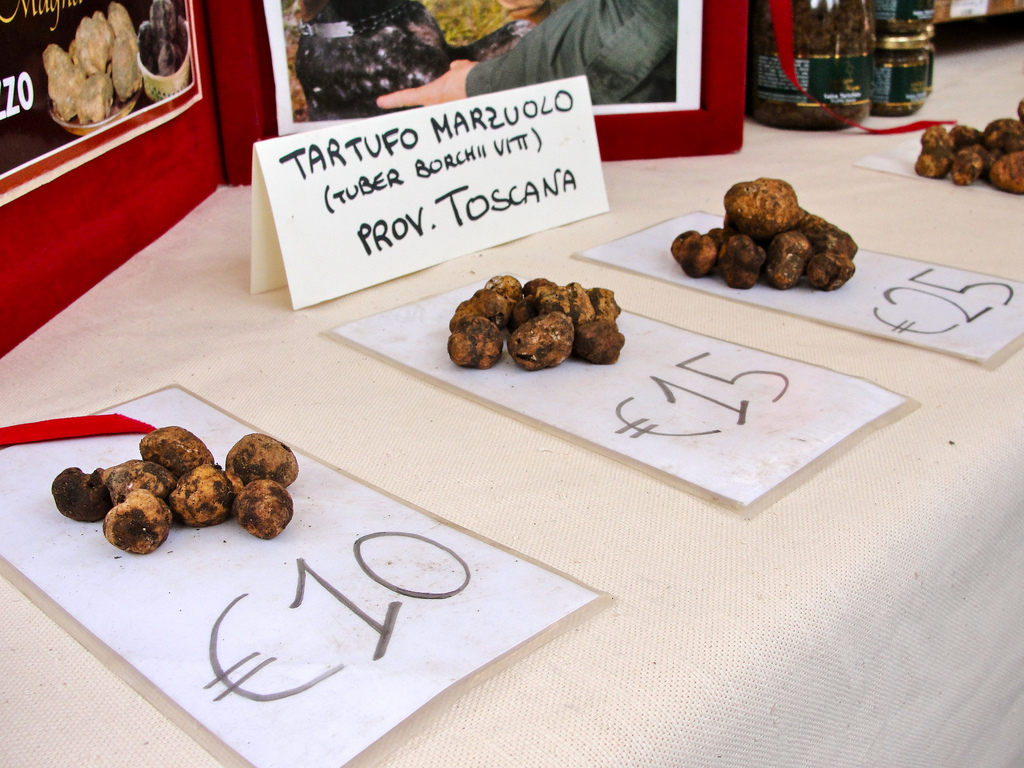
- At a market in Tuscany

Scientific classification
- Kingdom: Fungi
- Division: Ascomycota
- Class: Pezizomycetes
- Order: Pezizales
- Family: Tuberaceae
- Genus: Tuber
- Species: T. borchii

Binomial name
- Tuber borchii Vittad.

= Tuber borchii =

Species of fungi

Tuber borchii
- Mycological characteristics
- Glebal hymenium
- Hymenium attachment is not applicable
- Lacks a stipe
- Ecology is mycorrhizal
- Edibility is choice

Tuber borchii, known as the whitish truffle or bianchetto truffle, is a small, common species of edible truffle excellent for use in cuisine.

== Taxonomy ==
It was given its name by Carlo Vittadini from Latin borchii (from von der Borch, the naturalist who described the species in 1780).

== Description ==
It is from 1–3 centimetres (3/8–1 1/8 in) in size and rounded, with a tuber-like appearance, often bony or irregular. The exterior is slightly velvety and white at first, and when mature it has a smooth, reddish ochre surface with brown markings. It has a compact consistency and, when sectioned, the interior is whitish when young, light ochre or pinkish brown with age. A series of white, twisted and branched veins run through the interior. Young specimens give off a pleasant smell, but when mature they give off an unpleasant smell reminiscent of kitchen gas. The flavor is described by some as garlicky, by others as similar to hazelnuts.

Seen through a microscope, the spores have an ellipsoidal to rounded shape, measuring 35–55 × 25–40 microns, and are brown in colour. The ascii are rather rounded and contain 1 to 4 spores.

There are many similar species: Tuber asa (with spores shaped like lemons when immature), Tuber oligospermum and Tuber puberulum (which has rounder spores).

== Habitat and distribution ==
Whitish truffles often grow in oak groves, and less frequently under conifers. Like most truffles, it bears fruit underground, although not very deep (occasionally, mature specimens reach the surface). It bears fruit from winter to early summer (from December to June), in coastal or low-lying areas (between 200 and 1,000 metres above sea level). It is highly adaptable to different environments: although it prefers calcareous sandy soils (typical of coastal areas) it also bears fruit in T. melanosporum (black truffle) habitat at higher altitudes. It grows well in soils with a pH of 7–8, as well as in subalkalines with a pH of 6–7, although occasionally it also grows in soils with a pH as low as 5.2.

It is found throughout Europe: from Finland to Italy (Tuscany, Abruzzo, Romagna, Umbria, Marche, Molise and Sicily) and the Iberian Peninsula (Andalusia, Portugal, and Castile and León), and from Ireland and Great Britain to Hungary and Poland, very common in France, including Corsica.

== Cultivation ==
It is harvested from winter to spring (from mid-January to the end of April in Italy), unlike Tuber magnatum, which is collected in autumn and early winter. It sells for some 300–400 €/kg. Although it is not as sought after as T. magnatum or T. melanosporum, there are several reasons for its cultivation: it fruits early in new plantations (as early as 4 years in pine), is adaptable to different ecological niches, is not extremely specific to host plants, and lastly, it is very competitive with other ectomycorrhizal fungi (particularly in young plantations).

Mycorrhiza Biotech of Gibsonville, North Carolina, has been developing methods for commercial production of bianchetto truffles in North Carolina, reportedly producing as much as an estimated 91 kilograms (200 lb) in a single yield.
