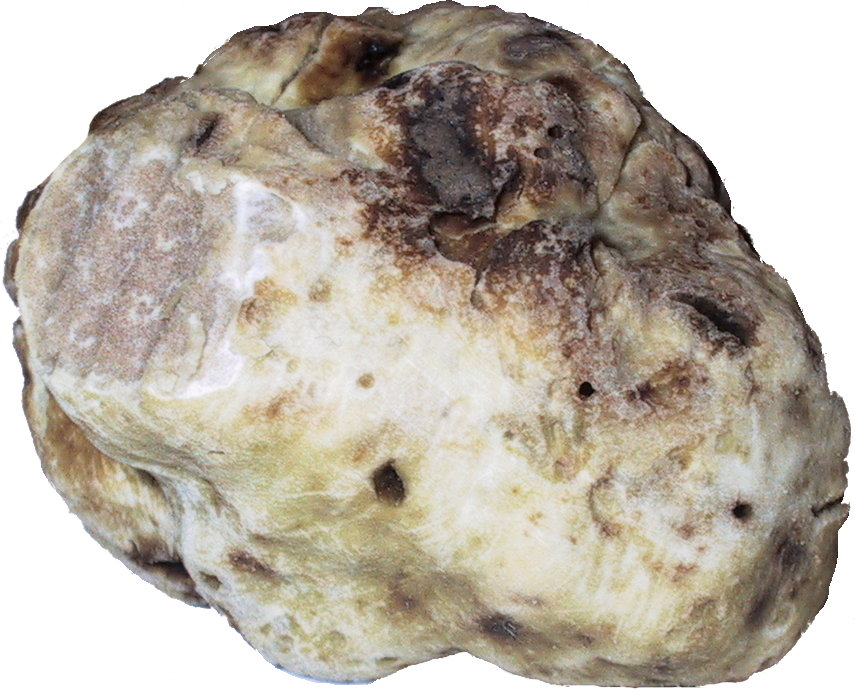
- White truffle washed and cut

Scientific classification
- Kingdom: Fungi
- Division: Ascomycota
- Class: Pezizomycetes
- Order: Pezizales
- Family: Tuberaceae
- Genus: Tuber
- Species: T. magnatum

Binomial name
- Tuber magnatum Picco, 1788

= Tuber magnatum =

Species of edible fungus

Tuber magnatum
- Mycological characteristics
- Glebal hymenium
- No distinct cap
- Hymenium attachment is not applicable
- Lacks a stipe
- Ecology is mycorrhizal
- Edibility is choice

Tuber magnatum, the white truffle (Italian: tartufo bianco d'Alba), is a species of truffle in the order Pezizales and family Tuberaceae. It is mainly found in Italy, but also in other parts of Southern Europe, as well as Thailand.

== Description ==
Fruiting in autumn, they can reach 12 centimetres (4 1/2 inches) in diameter and 500 grams (18 ounces), though are usually much smaller. The flesh is pale cream or brown with white marbling.

Outcrossing is known to occur in T. magnatum, though whether it is heterothallic remains unclear.

== Distribution ==
It is found mainly in the Langhe and Montferrat areas of the Piedmont region in northern Italy and, most famously, in the countryside around the cities of Alba and Asti. Acqualagna, in the northern part of the Marche near Urbino is another center for the production and commercialization of white truffles, and its annual festival is one of the most important in Italy. They can also be found in Molise, Abruzzo and in the hills around San Miniato, in Tuscany.

White truffles have also been found in Croatia (Istria, Motovun forest along the Mirna river), in the Ticino and Geneva cantons of Switzerland, in south-east France, in Sicily, Hungary, Serbia, Slovenia (along the Dragonja and Rizana river), Greece, and in Thailand.

In recent years, the search for truffles became very popular in Bosnia and Herzegovina. Especially abundant occurrence is recorded in the regions of Vlašić, Lisina and Kozara, and lately, after discovery of its presence, in the western part of the Herzegovina region, around the village of Služanj and the town of Čitluk.

== Habitat ==
=== Host plants ===
They grow symbiotically with oak, hazel, poplar and beech.

The most common host plants cited in the literature are oaks, including associations with Mediterranean species (Q. pubescens, Q. cerris and Q. ilex) and temperate species (Q. robur and Q. petraea). The second most common host plant cited are poplars, mainly Populus alba (about 13%) but also P. nigra, P. tremula, P. canadensis and P. deltoides. Among willows, four species are listed: Salix caprea, S. alba, S. purpurea and S. apennina.

Less commonly, they are associated with five other species of host plants, each from different genera: Abies alba (conifer), Alnus cordata, Fagus sylvatica, Pyrus pyraster and Ulmus minor.

=== Soils ===
Its soils have an average pH level of ~ 7.7, but it ranges from neutral to alkaline (in comparison, Tuber melanosporum (Périgord truffle) are restricted to alkaline environments).

In the Balkans and Pannonia regions, its soils contain 20% clay or more (in opposition to Tuber melanosporum which needs well-drained soils with higher sand/silt content); but in the Apennines and maybe also in Istria, the silt content dominates (45%) at the expense of clay (< 20%).

Much depends on the vertical repartition of mineral and organic matter, determined during initial soil formation due to flooding. The sediments are typically high in carbonates (15%) in Italy and Istria, but only around 10% at Hungarian and Balkan sites. Samely, organic matter content in Italy is three times higher (about 14%) than that of WT sites in the Balkans (4.5%). Nitrogen content is relatively low (0.19–0.26%). This gives a C/N ratio of around 7 at Italian sites - which corresponds to relatively slow decomposition rates - and a higher C/N ratio in the Hungarian and Balkan lowlands - exposed to very regular flooding, inducing faster decomposition rates and elevated microbial activity in the uppermost soil layer.

Associated microbial and fungal communities are poorly known at this stage (2018) and further studies in that direction are recommended.

=== Temperatures ===
Fruitbodies (ascocarps) need at least 0.4 °C (1st percentile) during their formation, which occurs in winter; therefore their distribution range is roughly limited to the north by the mean winter isotherm of 0 °C. But this limit may be modified by localised microclimatic pockets, such as may occur in rugged terrains.

Seasonality (the amplitude between summer and winter) seems to also play an important role. It thrives best at sites with ~ 13 °C per year, with average annual temperature ranges of ~ 12 °C in Mar–May, 22 °C in Jun–Aug, 14 °C in Sep–Nov, and 5 °C for Dec–Feb. The warmest mean air temperature for WT growth in Jun–Aug is 24.3 °C (99th percentile), about four degrees above the physiological optimum for mycelial development in soil; temperatures in excess of this limit reduce the amount of mycelium in the topsoil (on about 10 cm); this may explain why T. magnatum develops extra-radical mycelium in soil horizons below 30 cm.

=== Water ===
Drought-induced stress reduces the amount of mycelium in general. But T. magnatum is less tolerant than T. melanosporum and T. uncinatum (Burgundy truffle) of short-term precipitation deficits in summer because its peridium is not as well developed, thus subjecting the ascocarp to more water transpiration than in these two other species. But it also means that T. magnatum is more tolerant of summer excess precipitation - up to 180% of normal precipitations, which a bonus for sites located north of the Mediterranean, in particular Geneva (Switzerland). The ongoing climate change, with expected precipitation increase and projected warming, is likely to bring further north the present northernmost limit of its range and expand it into central and western Europe.

On the other hand, temperatures increase in humid continental climates (such as central Europe and the interior of the Balkan Peninsula) is likely to bring in more precipitations and subsequent floodings. The alluvial/riparian habitats of T. magnatum would then be subjected to excessive waterlogging and overall inundations, which would interfere with the development of mycorrhizae and the formation of fruitbodies, as demonstrated by the Burgundy truffle elsewhere.

== Uses ==
White truffles are considered edible.

=== Commercialisation ===
Italian white truffles are very highly esteemed and are the most valuable on the market. The white truffle market in Alba is busiest in the months of October and November when the Fiera del Tartufo (truffle fair) takes place. In 2001, T. magnatum truffles sold for between $2,200–$4,800 per kilogram ($1,000–$2,200 per pound); as of December 2009, they were being sold at $14,203.50/kg.

In November 1999, what was then the largest truffle in the world was found near Buje, Croatia. The truffle weighed 1.31 kg (2 lb 14 oz) and was entered into the Guinness Book of Records.

The record price paid for a single white truffle was set in December 2007, when Macau casino owner Stanley Ho paid $330,000 (£165,000) for a specimen weighing 1.5 kg (3 lb 5 oz). One of the largest truffles found in decades, it was unearthed near Pisa, Italy, and sold at an auction held simultaneously in Macau, Hong Kong, and Florence. This record was then matched on November 27, 2010, when Ho again paid $330,000 for a pair of white truffles, including one weighing nearly a kilogram.

In December 2014, a white truffle weighing 1.89 kg (4 lb 2 1/2 oz) was unearthed in the Umbrian region of Italy. It was auctioned by Sabatino Truffles at Sotheby's in New York. While some had expected it to sell for $1 million, it was sold for $61,000 to a Taiwanese buyer. In 2021, a white truffle from Piedmont weighing 830 g was sold for €103,000 at auction.

=== Frauds ===
Due to its high price tag and that T. magnatum is not the only white-coloured truffle around, frauds are frequent (such as T. borchii or T. asa). Cheaper Tuber borchii are sold for T. magnatum. A 2012 test showed that 15% of high-priced truffles sold as French were a cheaper type of truffles coming from China. Isotopic analysis is the most reliable detection of fraud or of mislabelling; the Jožef Stefan Institute in Slovenia is so far (2021) leading the establishment of a corresponding database

On the Asti market in 2012, more than 90% of the truffles did not come from Alba and about 75% of the white truffles supposedly from Piedmont came from other Italian regions. Tuber oligospermum, that grows well in Tunisia's dry sand and not deemed of any culinary value in Italy, is sold as T. magnatum. In some cases, scent is enhanced with such petroleum-based essence as bis(methylthio)methane which is harmful to human health. In 2017, Italy's financial police, the Guardia di Finanza, uncovered a €66 million tax fraud among truffle producers.

Zinc content is an important differentiating trait: it was found to be twice as high in T. magnatum than in all the other truffle species so far tested. T. magnatum also assimilates/accumulates Cu, K, Na, P, and Zn more efficiently than these other species; on the other hand, T. brumale was more successful in assimilating/accumulating S.

But carbon isotope signatures of the various truffle species cannot discriminate their geographical origins, because mycorrhizal fungi are enriched in ^{13}C compared to their host trees (fungi receive up to 20% of the total carbon fixed by their host trees), and forest ecosystems are characterized by settings that are too complex to allow for such discrimination. For example, highly heterogenous Italian forest ecosystems with high fungal biodiversity showed both the lowest and the highest δ^{34}S values in the truffle samples.

In 2017, a new Italian tax law imposed on truffle hunters earning more than €7,000 a year from truffle-hunting to provide receipts indicating the origin of their truffles upon the initial sale to a middleman.

== Bibliography ==
- Beatrice Belfiori, Valentina D'Angelo, Claudia Riccioni, Marco Leonardi, Francesco Paolocci, Giovanni Pacioni and Andrea Rubin. "Genetic Structure and Phylogeography of Tuber magnatum Populations, Diversity, vol. 12, n° 2, p. 44, January 2020.
- Luana Bontempo, Federica Camin & Roberto Larcher. "Isotopic and elemental characterisation of Italian white truffle: A first exploratory study", Food and Chemical Toxicology, vol. 145, November 2020.
- Ulf Büntgen, Maya Jäggi, Simon Egli, Martin Heule, Martina Peter, Imre Zagyva, Paul J. Krusic, Stephan Zimermann & Istvan Bagi. "No radioactive contamination from the Chernobyl disaster in Hungarian white truffles (Tuber magnatum)", Environmental Pollution, vol. 252, Part B, September 2019, p. 1643-1647.
- Tomáš Čejka, Miroslav Trnka & Ulf Büntgen. "Sustainable cultivation of the white truffle (Tuber magnatum) requires ecological understanding", Mycorrhiza, vol. 33, p. 291–302, 2023
- Vasilios Christopoulos, Polyxeni Psoma, Stephanos Diamandis. "Site characteristics of Tuber magnatum in Greece", Acta Mycologica, Vol. 48, n° 1, 2013
- Simone Graziosi, Ian Robert Hall & Alessandra Zambonelli. " The Mysteries of the White Truffle: Its Biology, Ecology and Cultivation", Encyclopedia, collection Encyclopedia of Fungi, vol. 2, n° 4, 2022 (detailed description of its morphology, differences with other white-coloured truffles, volatile components producing the aromas, etc.)
- "Controlled production of white truffles Made in France: a global first", press release, INRAE_{(fr)}, 16 February 2021
