= Gilkeya =

Scientific classification
- Domain: Eukaryota
- Kingdom: Fungi
- Division: Ascomycota
- Class: Pezizomycetes
- Order: Pezizales
- Family: Pyronemataceae
- Genus: Gilkeya; M.E. Sm., Trappe & Rizzo (2007)

Type species
- Hydnocystis compacta Harkn. (1899)

Genus of fungi

Gilkeya is a genus of fungi in the family Pyronemataceae. It is monotypic, containing the single species Gilkeya compacta. It is named after the American mycologist Helen Margaret Gilkey (1886–1972).

The genus was circumscribed by Matthew Edward Smith, James Martin Trappe and David M. Rizzo in Mycologia Vol.98 (Issue 5) on pages 705 in 2007.
