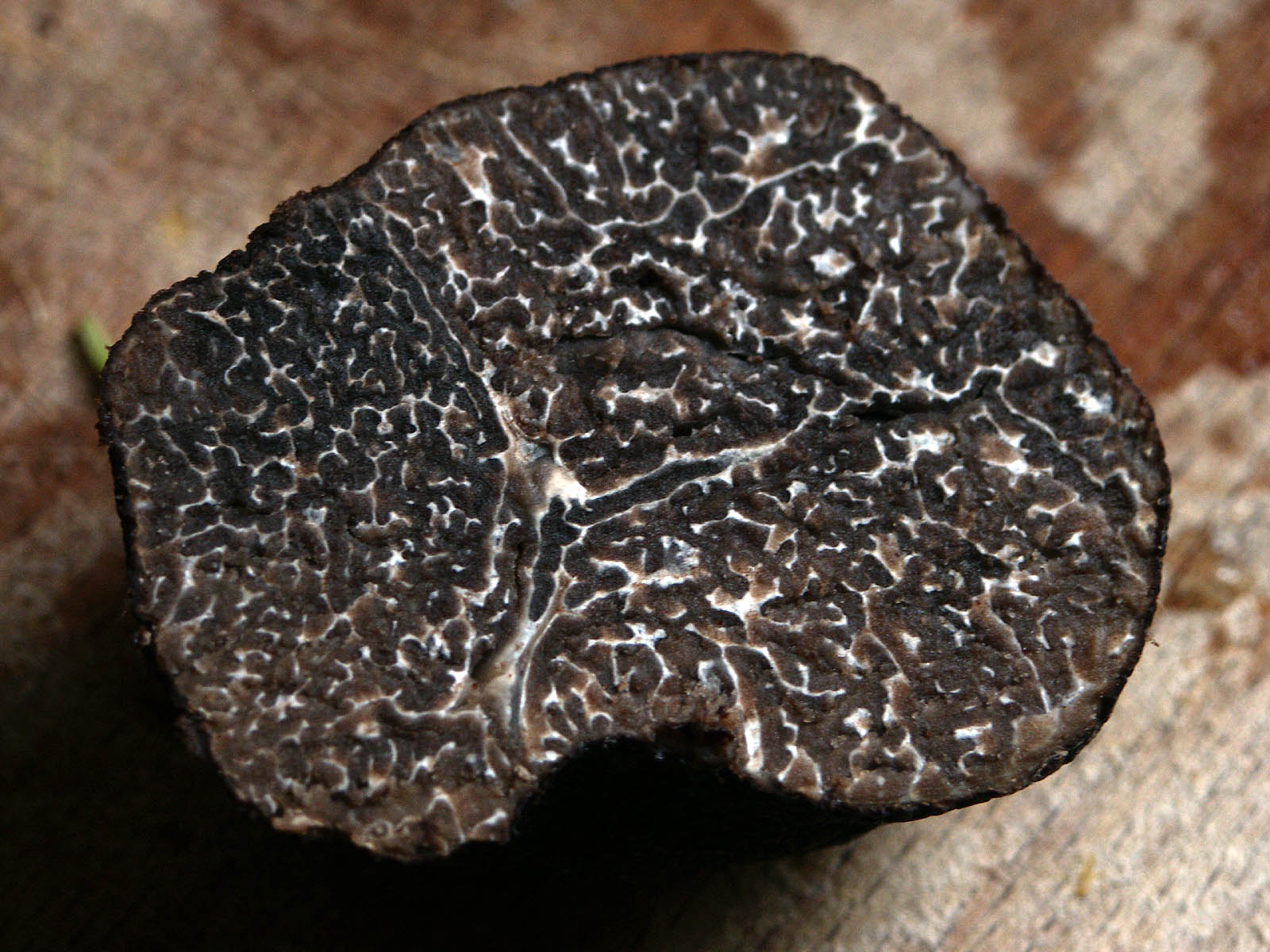
- Cut surface of Tuber brumale

Scientific classification
- Kingdom: Fungi
- Division: Ascomycota
- Class: Pezizomycetes
- Order: Pezizales
- Family: Tuberaceae
- Genus: Tuber
- Species: T. brumale

Binomial name
- Tuber brumale Vittad. (1831)

= Tuber brumale =

Species of fungus

Tuber brumale, also known as Muscat truffle or winter truffle, is a species of truffle native to Southern Europe. It is naturally present in the soils of many truffle orchards.
