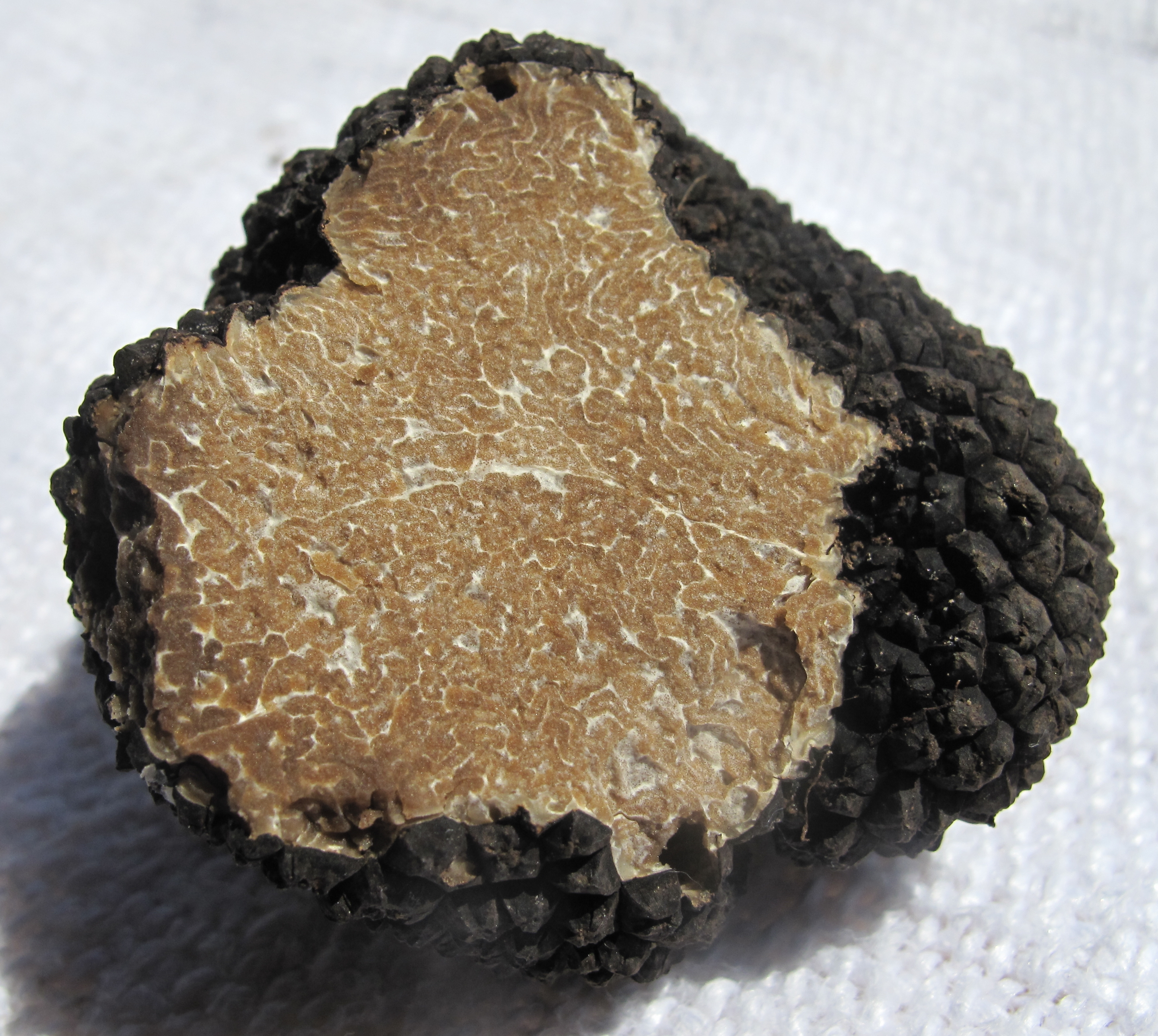
- Summer truffle, cut open

Scientific classification
- Kingdom: Fungi
- Division: Ascomycota
- Class: Pezizomycetes
- Order: Pezizales
- Family: Tuberaceae
- Genus: Tuber
- Species: T. aestivum

Binomial name
- Tuber aestivum Vittad. (1831)

Synonyms
- Tuber uncinatum Chatin (1892)

= Tuber aestivum =

Summer truffle / Burgundy truffle

Summer or burgundy truffle

Tuber aestivum
- Mycological characteristics
- Glebal hymenium
- Hymenium attachment is not applicable
- Lacks a stipe
- Spore print is blackish-brown to brown
- Ecology is mycorrhizal
- Edibility is choice

Tuber aestivum (summer truffle) or Tuber uncinatum (burgundy truffle) is a species of truffle found across Europe.

== Taxonomy ==
In cuisine and commerce, particularly in France and Italy, T. aestivum (the summer truffle) is distinguished from T. uncinatum (the burgundy truffle). However, molecular analysis showed in 2004 that these two varieties of truffle are one species. The differences between them are therefore likely due to environmental factors.

Hall et al. recommend using the older of the two binomial names, or senior synonym, T. aestivum, to designate the species.

== Description ==
The two truffles are a similar size, color and flavor, but the flesh (gleba) of summer truffles has a paler hazel color and a less intense aroma.

Burgundy truffles are somewhat large, with bodies (ascocarps) from 2 to 10 centimetres (1 to 4 inches) in diameter. Their brown or black outer skin (peridium) forms pyramidal warts about 3 to 9 mm (1/8 to 3/8 in) wide, resembling rough bark. They have a hazelnut-like aroma.

== Distribution and harvest ==
Summer truffles are most often found in the southern part of the distribution area of the species, notably in the Mediterranean climate areas of France, Italy and Spain.

Burgundy truffles have a wider distribution than any other truffle species. They are found across Europe, from Spain to eastern Europe and from Sweden to North Africa. In France they are found mainly in the northeast and in Italy, in the north. In the United Kingdom they were plentiful prior to the 20th century, but are now rare. Their distribution may not yet be definitively established: as of 2007, there are unconfirmed reports of findings in China.

The Chinese "population" has since been identified as a new species Tuber sinoaestivum. As of 2022 it is the closest-known species to T. aestivum, its sister species.

== Uses ==
Summer truffles are harvested from May to August (as suggested by their common name).

Burgundy truffles are harvested from September to late December, sometimes also until late January. They are prized for their gastronomic qualities. They are used in the haute cuisine of France and Italy, sometimes as a less expensive, milder substitute for T. melanosporum (Périgord black truffle) when the latter is not available. Like other truffles, burgundy truffles are also packaged for export.

== Regional names ==
Regionally, summer truffles are known as, in French: truffe d'été; Italian: tartufo estivo; and Catalan: tòfona d'estiu.

Burgundy truffles are regionally known as, in French: truffe de Bourgogne, Italian: tartufo nero di Fragno or scorzone ('bark'), Spanish: trufa de verano, Catalan: tòfona gravada, and Swedish: svart sommartryffel.
