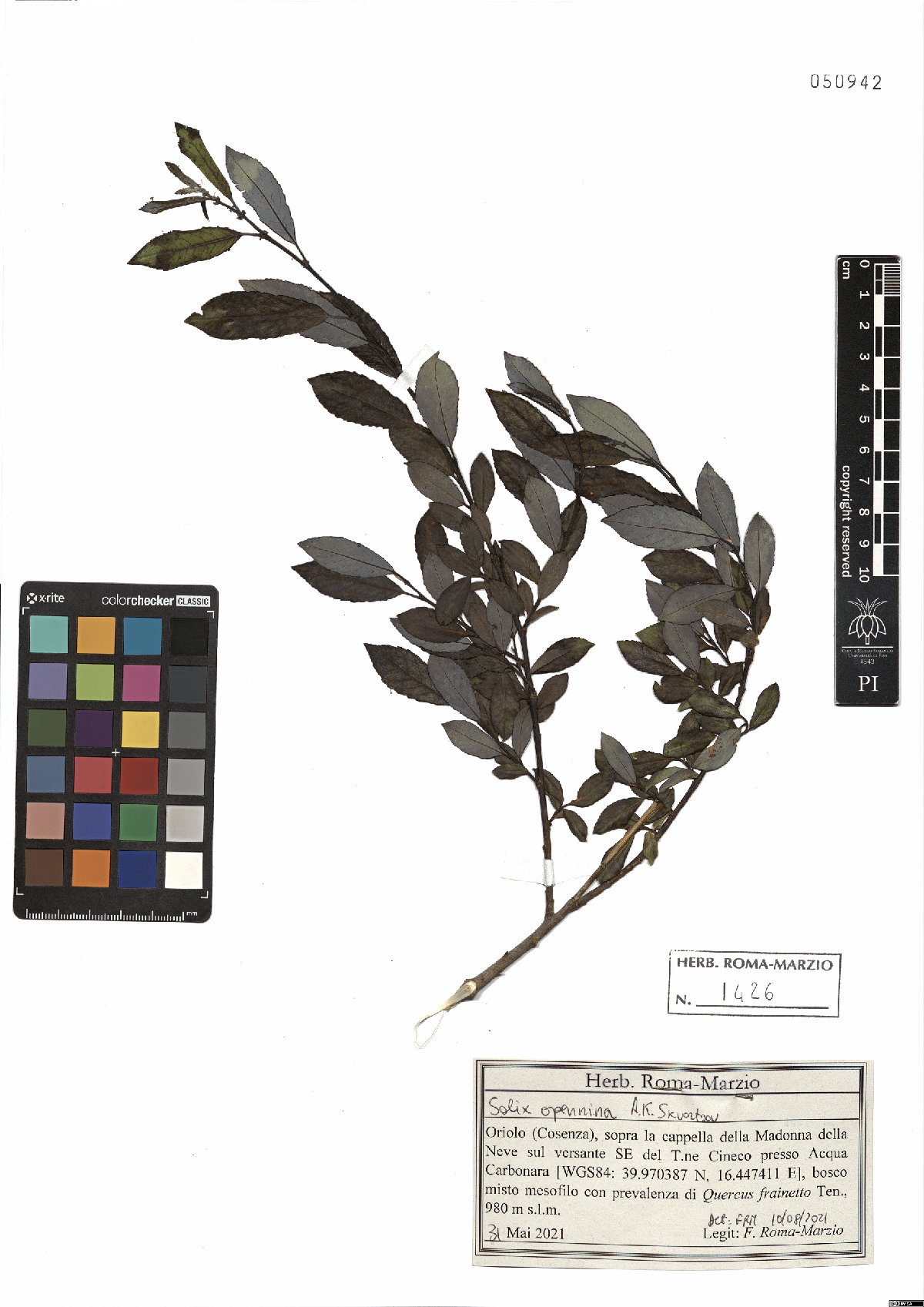

Conservation status
- Least Concern (IUCN 3.1)

Scientific classification
- Kingdom: Plantae
- Clade: Embryophytes
- Clade: Tracheophytes
- Clade: Spermatophytes
- Clade: Angiosperms
- Clade: Eudicots
- Clade: Rosids
- Order: Malpighiales
- Family: Salicaceae
- Genus: Salix
- Species: S. apennina

Binomial name
- Salix apennina A.K.Skvortsov

= Salix apennina =

Species of flowering plant

Salix apennina, the Apennine willow, is a species of flowering plant in the family Salicaceae, native to Italy. It is a pioneer species, among the very first to colonize recently denuded stream beds.
