= Fedor Bucholtz =

Mycologist and phytopathologist (1872–1924)

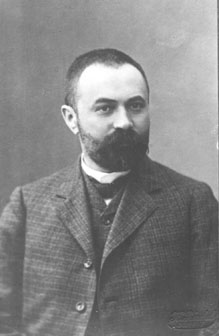
- Fedor Bucholtz
- Born: October 29, 1872; Warsaw, Congress Poland (then Russian Empire)
- Died: April 30, 1924 (aged 51); Tartu, Estonia
- Education: Moscow University
- Known for: Research on hypogeous fungi; establishing phytopathological work at the University of Tartu
- Scientific career
- Fields: Mycology, Phytopathology, Botany
- Workplaces: Riga Polytechnic Institute; University of Tartu

Fedor (Feodor) Vladimirovich Bucholtz (29 October 1872 – 30 April 1924) was a mycologist and phytopathologist who taught at the Riga Polytechnic Institute and later worked as an invited professor at the University of Tartu. He published on plant-pathogenic fungi (including rusts) and on hypogeous fungi, and in Tartu he established a phytopathological unit described in the literature as the university's Phytopathological Cabinet and/or the Phytopathological Experimental Station (founded 1922).

Some sources give his birth date as 28 October 1872 rather than 29 October 1872.

== Education and career ==
Bucholtz studied at Moscow University under Ivan N. Gorozhankin and undertook further training in Bern and Munich in 1896–1897. By 1897 he was a lecturer in botany at the Riga Polytechnic Institute, later becoming professor (appointed 1907) and serving as dean of its agricultural division in 1912.

After the First World War he took up a position as invited professor in botany at the University of Tartu in 1919, where he organised teaching and research in botany and worked with the university's botanical garden. In an institutional history of the University of Tartu Botanical Gardens, he is described as the first professor of botany (1919–1924) and first head of the botanical gardens (1919–1922) in the reopened Estonian university period.

== Scientific work ==
His published work focused on plant-pathogenic fungi (including rusts) and hypogeous fungi, and contemporaries noted his research on Endogone. Pfister reports that a monograph on Endogone was presented for his doctoral thesis to Moscow University in 1913.

In 1915, Bucholtz started to edit and publish the exsiccatae, Fungi Rossici exsiccati [Gerbarii russkikh gribov]. Ser. A and Fungi Rossici exsiccati [Gerbarii russkikh gribov]. Ser. B, later continued together with Apollinarij Semionovich Bondartsev.

== Institutions, collections, and legacy ==
In Tartu, Bucholtz founded a phytopathological unit at the university described as the Phytopathological Cabinet, and other accounts describe the establishment (1922) of the University of Tartu's Phytopathological Experimental Station, from which the mycological herbarium later known as EAA developed. Parmasto (2010) notes his election as vice-president of the Tartu Naturalists’ Society and his editorial role in its Transactions, and reports that he received Estonian citizenship in 1920.

Following Bucholtz's death, correspondence initiated by Roland Thaxter led to Harvard University's acquisition of part of his herbarium and library for the Farlow Herbarium and Farlow Reference Library; Pfister reports approximately 5,200 specimens and about 800 books and reprints were received.

The standard botanical author abbreviation for his name is Bucholtz.
