= Helen Margaret Gilkey =

American botanist, mycologist and scientific illustrator (1886–1972)

- Born: 6 March 1886; Montesano, Washington, US
- Died: 7 August 1972 (aged 86)
- Education: University of California, Berkeley; Oregon Agricultural College
- Known for: study of truffles scientific illustrations
- Scientific career
- Fields: mycology botany
- Workplaces: Oregon Agricultural College
- Thesis: A Revision of the Tuberales of California
- Author abbrev. (botany): Gilkey

Helen Margaret Gilkey (1886–1972) was an American mycologist and botanist, as well as a botanical illustrator and watercolor artist. She was born on 6 March 1886, in Montesano, Washington, and moved to Corvallis, Oregon with her family in 1903. She died in 1972 at the age of 86.

== Education ==
Gilkey received both a bachelor's and a master's degree from Oregon Agricultural College (now Oregon State University) for her studies in botany (including mycology) and botanical illustration. She continued her studies at the University of California, Berkeley, and in 1915 she became the first woman to receive a Ph.D. in botany there. Gilkey's doctoral dissertation focused on the taxonomy of North American truffles (order Tuberales), and her published dissertation remains an important contribution to the study of truffle taxonomy in North America.

== Career ==
After completing her doctoral studies, Gilkey worked as a scientific illustrator. She contributed original illustrations to Willis Linn Jepson's Manual of Flowering Plants of California. In 1918, Gilkey secured a position as the herbarium curator at the Oregon Agricultural College. Gilkey was best known for her extensive studies on truffles, but she also conducted research on vascular plants. Gilkey described many species of truffles from the United States as well as a few from Argentina and Australia. Her 1939 monograph is on the Tuberales of North America. The standard author abbreviation Gilkey is used to indicate this person as the author when citing a botanical name.. Over the course of her academic career, Gilkey published many books and over 40 scientific articles, with the last book being her Handbook of Northwestern Plants, published in 1967.

== Awards and honors ==
In 1952, Gilkey received the "Outstanding Scientist" award from the Oregon Academy of Science, and she won the same award from the Northwest Scientific Association in 1969. She was inducted into the Berkeley Women's Hall of Fame in 1996. In 2006 the truffle genus Gilkeya was named in her honor.
