= Charles Heimsch =

American botanist (1914–2003)

- Born: May 4, 1914; Dayton, Ohio
- Died: April 23, 2003 (aged 88); Moscow, Idaho
- Resting place: Oxford, Ohio
- Education: Miami University; Harvard University; University of California, Berkeley
- Scientific career
- Fields: Botany
- Workplaces: Swarthmore College; Amherst College; University of Texas at Austin; Miami University

Charles Heimsch (May 4, 1914 – April 23, 2003) was an American botanist who specialized in systematic plant anatomy. He helped establish a doctoral program while chair of the Department of Botany at Miami University, a position which he held for 18 years. He served as editor-in-chief for the American Journal of Botany from 1964 to 1969, and was president of the Botanical Society of America from 1971 to 1972.

He authored many scholarly articles on the subject of plant anatomy, and has published two textbooks.

== Legacy ==
In 1994, Heimsch was inducted into the Miami University Athletic Hall of Fame as a standout football player. He played as both a quarterback and a linebacker/defensive back on the team coached by Frank Wilton.

The Charles Heimsch Conference Room in Pearson Hall at Miami University is named for him. The Charles Heimsch Graduate Award in Botany given out at Miami University is also named in his honor.
