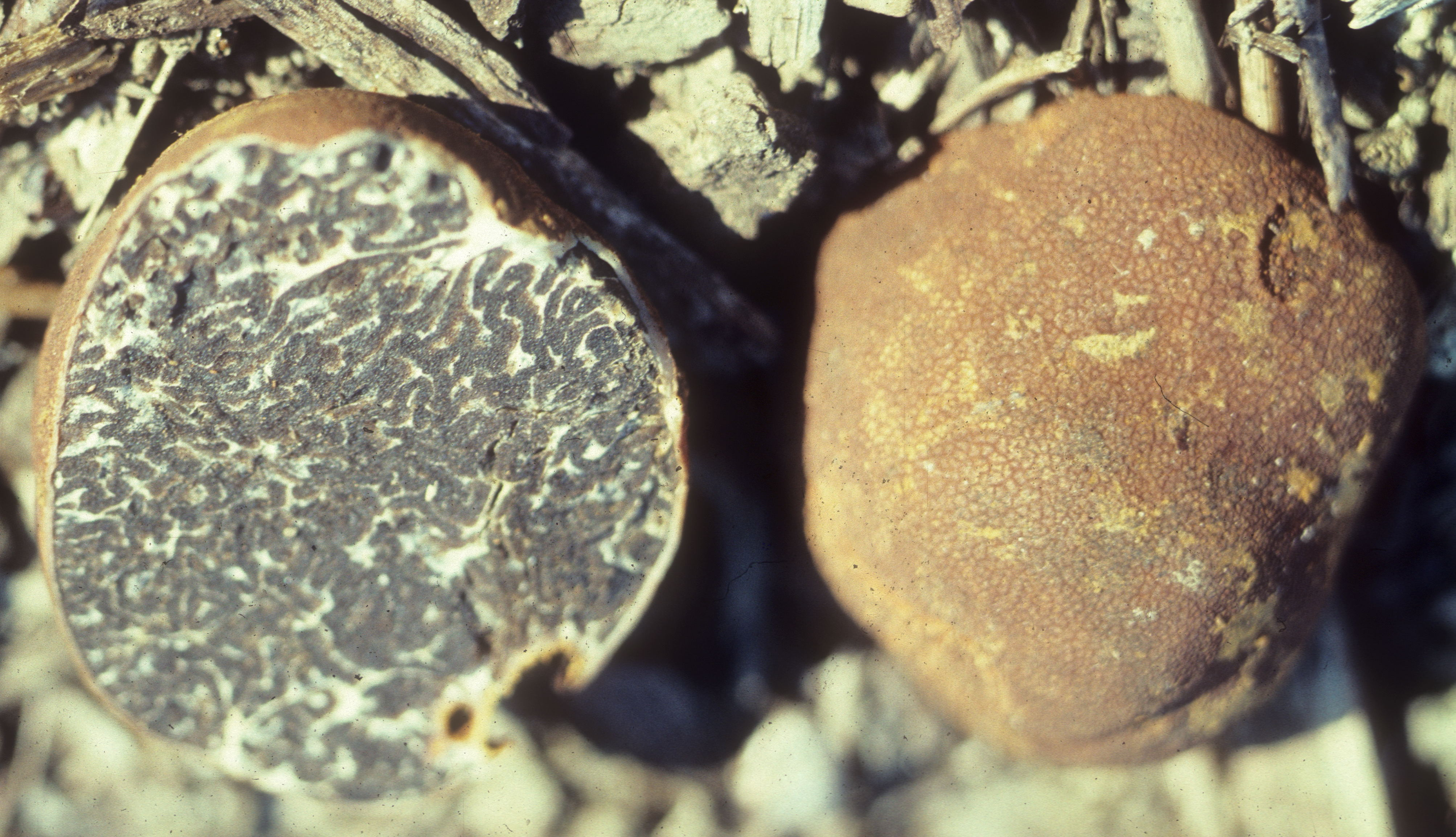

Scientific classification
- Kingdom: Fungi
- Division: Ascomycota
- Class: Pezizomycetes
- Order: Pezizales
- Family: Tuberaceae
- Genus: Tuber
- Species: T. canaliculatum

Binomial name
- Tuber canaliculatum Gilkey

= Tuber canaliculatum =

Species of truffle (fungus)

Tuber canaliculatum, commonly called Michigan truffle and Appalachian truffle, is a fungus that grows in eastern North America including the Midwest. It is brick red in color. It is foraged and used in Appalachian cuisine.

Dogs have been used to locate the truffles. It has been investigated for commercial cultivation.
