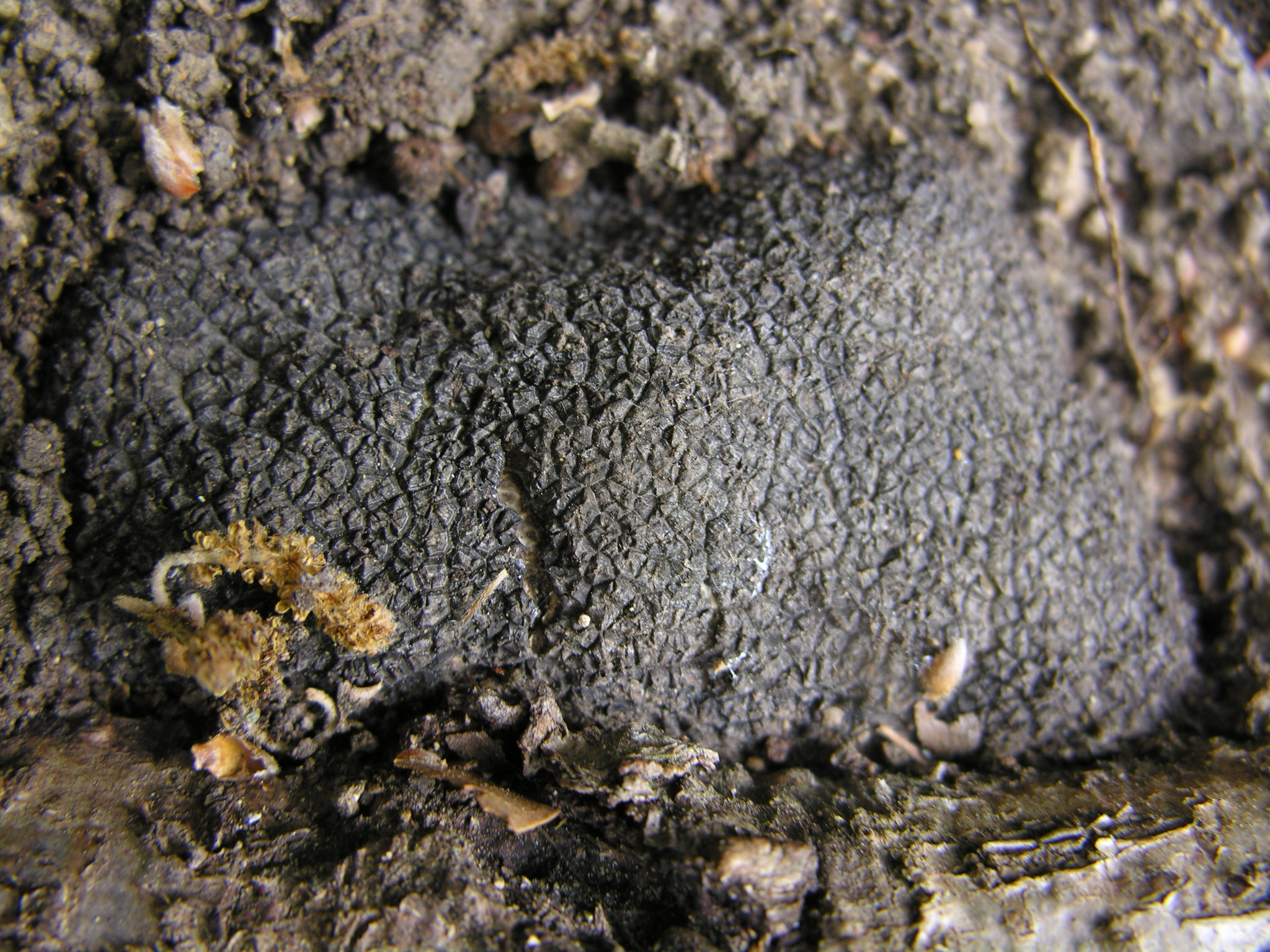
- Fruiting body of Tuber melanosporum

Scientific classification
- Kingdom: Fungi
- Division: Ascomycota
- Class: Pezizomycetes
- Order: Pezizales
- Family: Tuberaceae
- Genus: Tuber
- Species: T. melanosporum

Binomial name
- Tuber melanosporum Vittad. 1831

= Tuber melanosporum =

Black truffle

Tuber melanosporum
- Mycological characteristics
- Glebal hymenium
- Hymenium attachment is not applicable
- Lacks a stipe
- Spore print is yellow
- Ecology is mycorrhizal
- Edibility is choice

Tuber melanosporum, commonly called black truffle, Périgord truffle or French black truffle, is a species of truffle native to Southern Europe. It is one of the most expensive edible fungi in the world. In 2013, the truffle cost between 1,000 and 2,000 euros per kilogram.

== Taxonomy ==
Italian naturalist Carlo Vittadini described the black truffle in 1831.

== Description ==
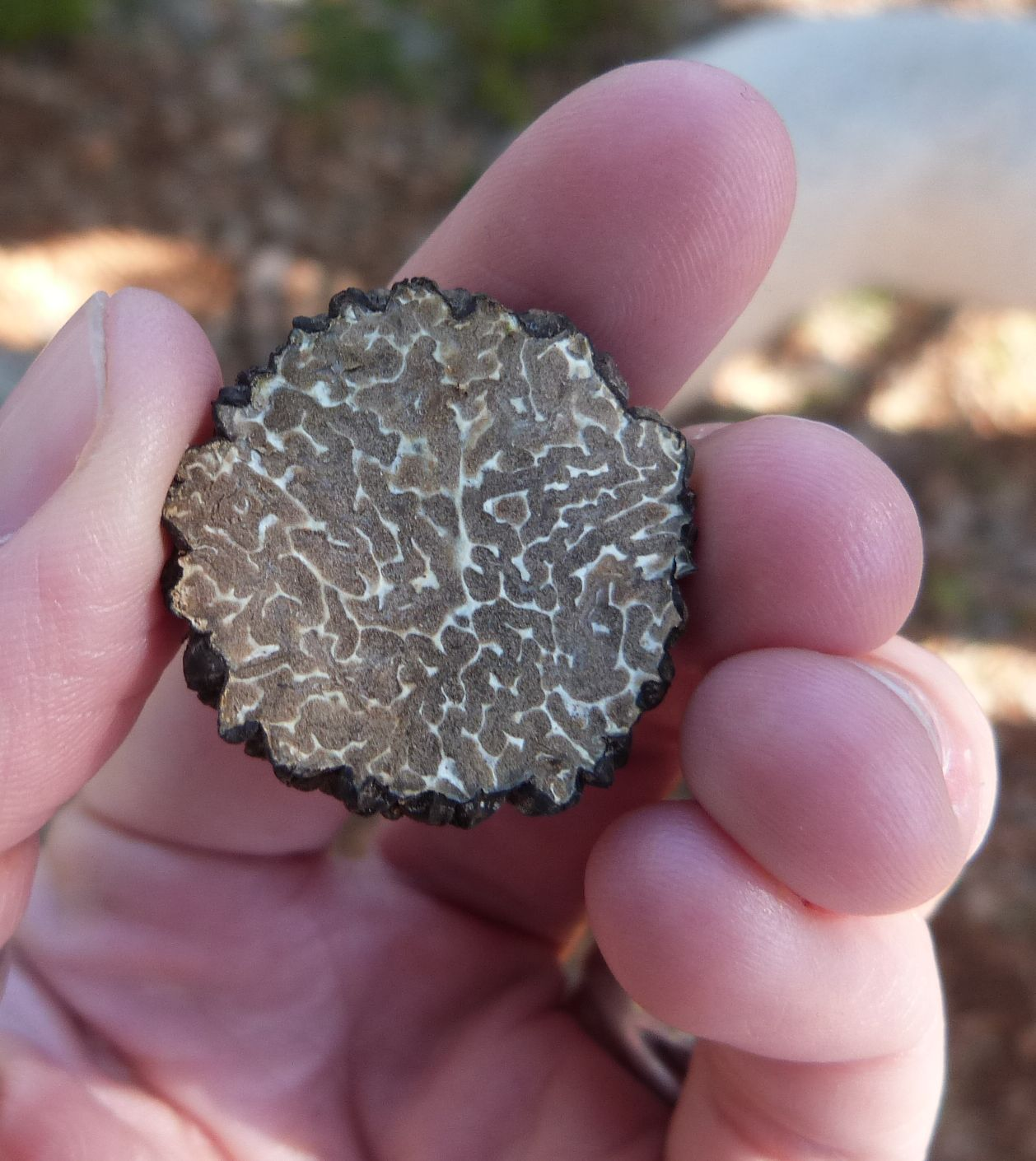
Black truffle, cut

The round, dark brown fruiting bodies (ascocarps) have a black-brown skin with small pyramidal cusps. They have a strong, aromatic smell and normally reach a size of up to 10 centimetres (4 inches). Some may be significantly larger, such as a black truffle found in 2012 in Dordogne with a mass of 1.277 kilograms (2.82 pounds).

Their flesh is initially white, then dark. It is permeated by white veins, which turn brown with age. The spores are elliptical and measure about 22–55 μm by 20–35 μm. They are dark brown and covered with large spikes.

In the Northern Hemisphere, the fruiting bodies develop from April to June and are harvested from November to March.

Until 2010, all truffle species were thought to be homothallic, that is, capable of sexual reproduction from a single organism. Subsequent research indicated that black truffles are heterothallic; that is, sexual reproduction requires contact between the mycelia of different mating types. If mycelia of different mating types surround a tree, eventually, one type becomes predominant.

=== Aroma ===
The fruiting bodies of the black truffle exude a scent reminiscent of undergrowth, strawberries, wet earth, or dried fruit with a hint of cocoa. Their taste, which fully develops after the truffles are heated, is slightly peppery and bitter. If stored at room temperature, the aromatic compounds dissipate, while storage around the freezing point (0 °C) leads to an increased synthesis of these compounds.

The volatile compounds that contribute to the aroma and are developed by the fruiting bodies include 2-methyl-1-butanol, isoamyl alcohol, 2-methylbutyraldehyde, and 3-methylbutyraldehyde, as well as traces of sulfur compounds. One of these, dimethyl sulfide, is what attracts truffle dogs, truffle hogs and truffle flies to the fruiting bodies. Several species of yeast, which produce part of the aromatic compounds, have been isolated from Tuber melanosporum and Tuber magnatum.

=== Chemistry ===
The genome of the black truffle was published in 2010. It contains 125 million base pairs, 58% of the genome consists of transposable elements, and the genome contains only 7,500 identified protein-encoding genes. During symbiosis, genes involved in the decomposition of plant cell walls and lipids are induced. This indicates that black truffles decompose the cell walls of their host plants at the beginning of the symbiosis.

Truffles contain the endocannabinoid anandamide (AEA) and the major metabolic enzymes of the endocannabinoid system (ECS). The AEA content increases in the late stages of truffles' development. AEA and ECS metabolic enzymes may have evolved earlier than endocannabinoid-binding receptors, and AEA might be an ancient attractant to truffle-eating animals, which are well-equipped with endocannabinoid-binding receptors.

=== Similar species ===
Phylogeny of the Melanosporum phylogroup

- - - - - T. formosanum China
        - - T. sinense China
          - T. yigongense China
      - T. longispinosum Japan
    - T. melanosporum Italy
  - - T. pseudobrumale China
    - - T. pesudohimalayaense China
      - T. variabilisporum China
- T. brumale Italy

Fan et al., 2022. Multigene, maximum-likelihood figure 1.

The black truffle is morphologically very similar to the commercially less valuable Chinese truffle (Tuber indicum). To avoid fraud or misidentifications in commerce, a RFLP genetic test has been developed to distinguish the two species. Externally, they can be distinguished by their skin, which is smoother and dark red or dark brown in the Chinese truffle. Two other similar truffle species are the summer truffle (Tuber aestivum) and the winter truffle (Tuber brumale), whose flesh is gray-black with white veins that remain always white, unlike those of black truffles which change color when exposed to the air.

== Distribution and habitat ==
The natural habitat of the black truffle includes various regions in Spain, France, Italy, and Croatia. These are presumably the areas where the host plants found refuge during the last Ice Age. In these areas, the search for black truffles and their cultivation is a tradition going back more than 200 years. Truffles are still collected manually in a traditional way in large areas of natural forests. For example, the county of Alto Maestrazgo (province of Castellón, Spain) has an ideal ground with suitable conditions for cultivating truffles. Albocàsser, Atzaneta, Culla, and Morella are just some of the villages in this region where one can find black truffles in large numbers.

Climate change has increasingly affected this form of recollection, and since 2010, a significant drop in productivity has occurred in naturally producing forests.

== Ecology ==
=== Development and phenology ===
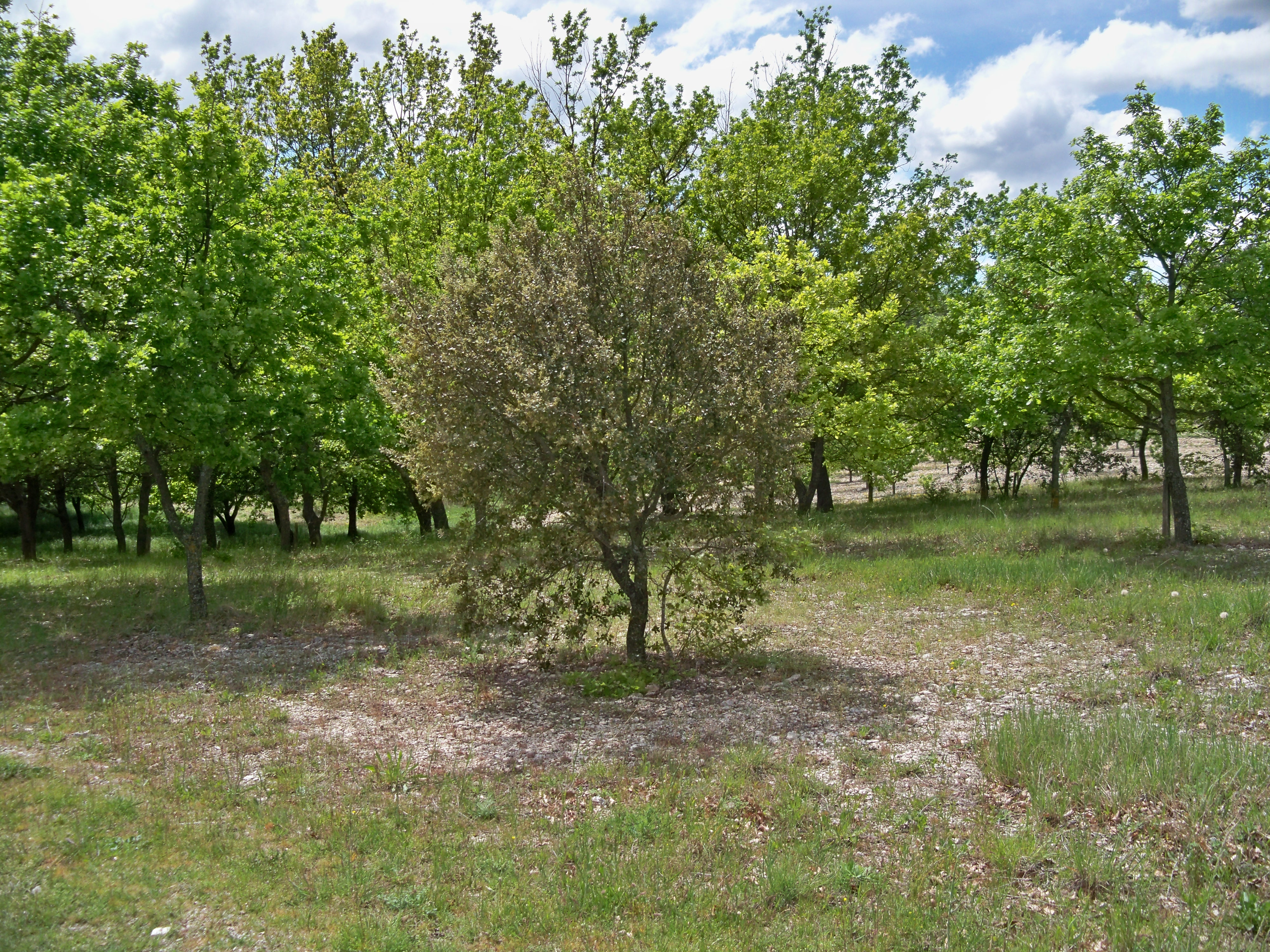
Black truffles suppress the growth of plants around their symbiont, creating the impression of a burnt area.

Black truffles grow at a depth of 5 cm (2 in) to 50 cm (20 in) as ectomycorrhizae, preferably in loose calcareous soil, close to the roots of their plant symbionts. These include holm oaks, French oaks, hazel, cherry and other deciduous trees. The symbiosis of holm oak saplings and black truffles has been shown to improve photosynthesis and root growth in the plant.

Black truffles suppress the growth of plants around their symbiont, creating the impression of a burnt (brûlé) area around it. They do so by parasitizing the roots of other plants, which may lead to necrosis of the root bark and the death of the parasitized plant. Moreover, part of the scent emitted by the truffles may limit the growth of other plants through oxidative stress.

=== Reproduction ===
Boars and the larvae of the truffle fly (Suillia tuberiperda), which eat the fruiting bodies, aid in the distribution of the species by excreting the indigestible spores. Their excrement likely also serves to fertilize the spores. Black truffles are sometimes found together with winter truffles, which aid the growth of black truffles in wet soils.

== Cultivation ==
To improve production, planters must ensure that neighboring trees harbor mycelia of different mating types, such as by inoculating new saplings with a mycelium of a particular type.

Cultivated areas are increasingly popular, and in central Spain, several thousands of hectares are dedicated to truffle cultivation (the most frequent of the black truffle being in Sarrión, Teruel province in the Aragon region). Some experiments have also been conducted in burnt areas, with promising results, as legally, no need to ask for a land-use change exists when planting truffles, as it can be considered (EU-28) as forest land.

Black truffles are now also cultivated in Australia, New Zealand, Chile, North America, Argentina, South Africa, and Wales. Cultivation involves the planting of, for example, hazel trees whose roots are inoculated with truffle mycelium. The first fruiting bodies can be harvested about 4–10 years after planting the trees.

France accounts for around 45% of the world's production of black truffles, Spain 35%, and Italy 20%. Smaller amounts are produced in the United States, South Africa, Slovenia, Croatia, and the Australian states of Tasmania and Western Australia. In 2005, black truffles were found in Serbia. About 80% of the French production comes from southeast France: upper Provence (départements of Vaucluse and Alpes-de-Haute-Provence), part of Dauphiné (département of Drôme), and part of Languedoc (département of Gard). About 20% of the production comes from southwest France: Quercy (département of Lot) and Périgord. The largest truffle market in France (and probably also in the world) is at Richerenches in Vaucluse. The largest truffle market in southwest France is at Lalbenque in Quercy. These markets are busiest in January when the black truffles are mature and have their highest perfume.

Production has considerably diminished during the 21st century, dropping to around 20 metric tonnes per year, with peaks of about 46 tonnes in the best years. By comparison, in 1937, France produced about 1,000 metric tonnes of black truffles.

The following table shows the production in the EU of T. melanosporum in Spain, France, and Italy. Production data are in metric tonnes and country weights in percentage and come from the Groupe Européen Truffe et Trufficulture, an association of the leading European producers.

Years	Spain	France	Italy	EU	% of average year	Spain vs EU	France vs EU	Italy vs EU
1990/1991	30	17	5	52	83	58	33	10
1991/1992	10	20	5	35	56	29	57	14
1992/1993	23	31	3	57	90	40	54	5
1993/1994	9	22	2	33	52	27	67	6
1994/1995	4	12	30	46	73	9	26	65
1995/1996	20	19	25	64	102	31	30	39
1996/1997	25	50	20	95	151	26	53	21
1997/1998	80	30	24	134	213	60	22	18
1998/1999	7	14	4	25	40	28	56	16
1999/2000	35	40	10	85	135	41	47	12
2000/2001	6	35	4	45	71	13	78	9
2001/2002	20	15	5	40	63	50	38	13
2002/2003	40	35	20	95	151	42	37	21
2003/2004	7	9	6	22	35	32	41	27
2004/2005	22	27	10	59	94	37	46	17
2005/2006	14	15	8	37	59	38	41	22
2006/2007	20	28	10	58	92	34	48	17
2007/2008	25	26	8	59	94	42	44	14
2008/2009	14	58	20	92	146	15	63	22
2009/2010	9	32	8	49	78	18	65	16
2010/2011	18	37,2	12	67,2	107	27	55	18
2011/2012	14,5	42,3	8	64,8	103	22	65	12
2012/2013	15	38,2	20	73,2	116	20	52	27
2013/2014	45	50	30	125	198	36	40	24

As the data show, France has been the leading producer of black truffles in the last decade and a half but is rapidly challenged by Spain, where regions have made use of the EU-funded Rural Development Programme to subsidise cultivated plantations. This is particularly visible in the Teruel province of the Aragón region, where the black truffle represents the first and main economic activity (in GDP and employment), especially since 2010-2011 when many plantations opened under the last Rural Development Programme 2000-2006 came into production phase.

== Uses ==
With a price of about 1,000 to 2,000 euros per kilogram, black truffles are the second-most expensive truffles after white truffles and one of the most sought-after edible mushrooms in the world.

In cooking, black truffles are used to refine the taste of meat, fish, soups, cheeses, and risotto. Unlike white truffles, the aroma of black truffles does not diminish when they are heated but becomes more intense. They are commonly shaved into or on top of a dish raw or infused with high-quality olive oil or butter.
