= Oreste Mattirolo =

Italian botanist and mycologist (1856–1947)

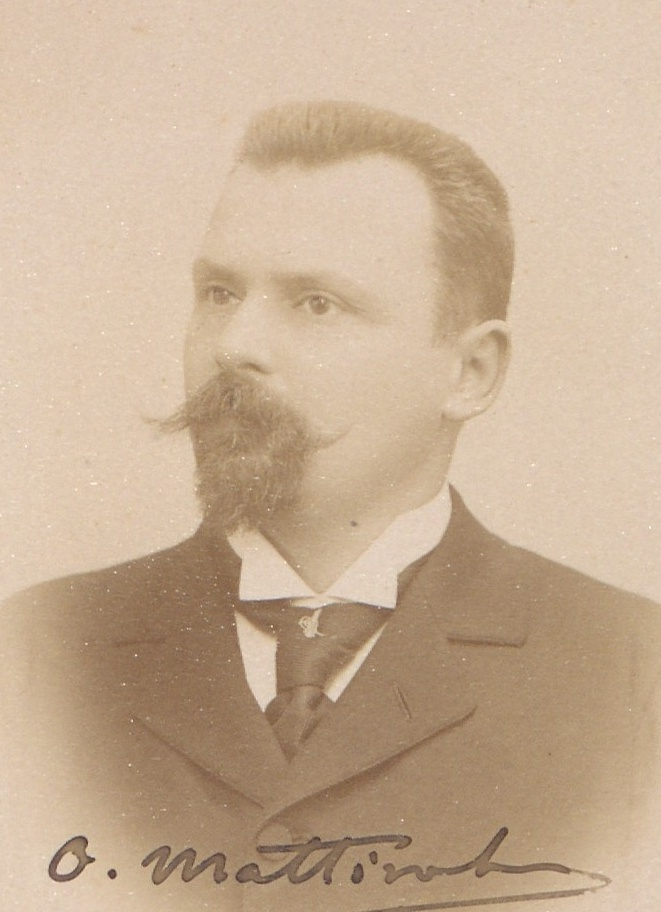
Oreste Mattirolo (before 1895)

Oreste Mattirolo (7 December 1856, in Turin – 3 December 1947, in Turin) was an Italian botanist and mycologist, who specialized in hypogeal fungi.

He studied medicine and sciences at the University of Turin, and from 1879, continued his education at the University of Strasbourg as a pupil of Heinrich Anton de Bary. In 1894 he became an associate professor at the University of Bologna, where he attained a full professorship during the following year. Later on, he served as a professor of botany and director of the botanical gardens at the universities of Florence (1898–1900) and Turin (1900–37).

The mycological genera Mattirolia (Berl. & Bres., 1889) and Mattirolomyces (E.Fisch., 1938) commemorate his name.

== Selected works ==
- Sul parassitismo dei Tartufi e sulla quistione delle mycorrhizae, 1887 – On the parasitism of truffles and the question of mycorrhizae.
- Reliquiæ Morisianæ; ossia, Elenco di piante e località nuove per la flora di Sardegna recentemente scoperte nell'erbario di G.G. Moris, 1892 – Reliquiae Morisianae; List of plants and locations concerning the flora of Sardinia recently discovered in the herbarium of Giuseppe Giacinto Moris.
- L'opera botanica di Ulisse Aldrovandi (1549-1605), 1897 – The botanical work of Ulisse Aldrovandi.
- Cenni chronologici sugli Orti Botanici di Firenze, 1899 – Chronological notes on the Botanical Gardens of Florence.
- Giulio Camus e la sua opera botanica (1847-1917), 1917 – Giulio Camus and his botanical work.
