= Carlo Vittadini =

Italian mycologist (1800–1865)

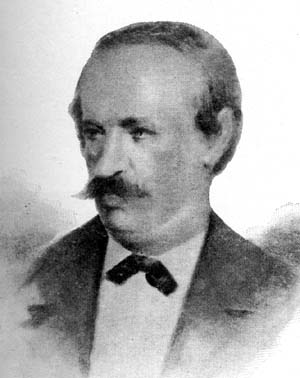
Carlo Vittadini

Carlo Vittadini (11 June 1800, in Monticelli 20 November 1865, in Milan) was an Italian medical doctor and mycologist.

== Life ==
He studied in Milan and at the University of Pavia, where he attended the classes given by Giuseppe L. Moretti (1782–1853). He became a doctor of medicine in 1826 with a thesis entitled Tentamen mycologicum seu Amanitarum illustratio where he described 14 species of the genus Amanita.

Outside of several publications on diseases of silkworms, he specialised in obstetrics, working in Milan. He is the author of several important works on Italian mushroom species.

== Works ==
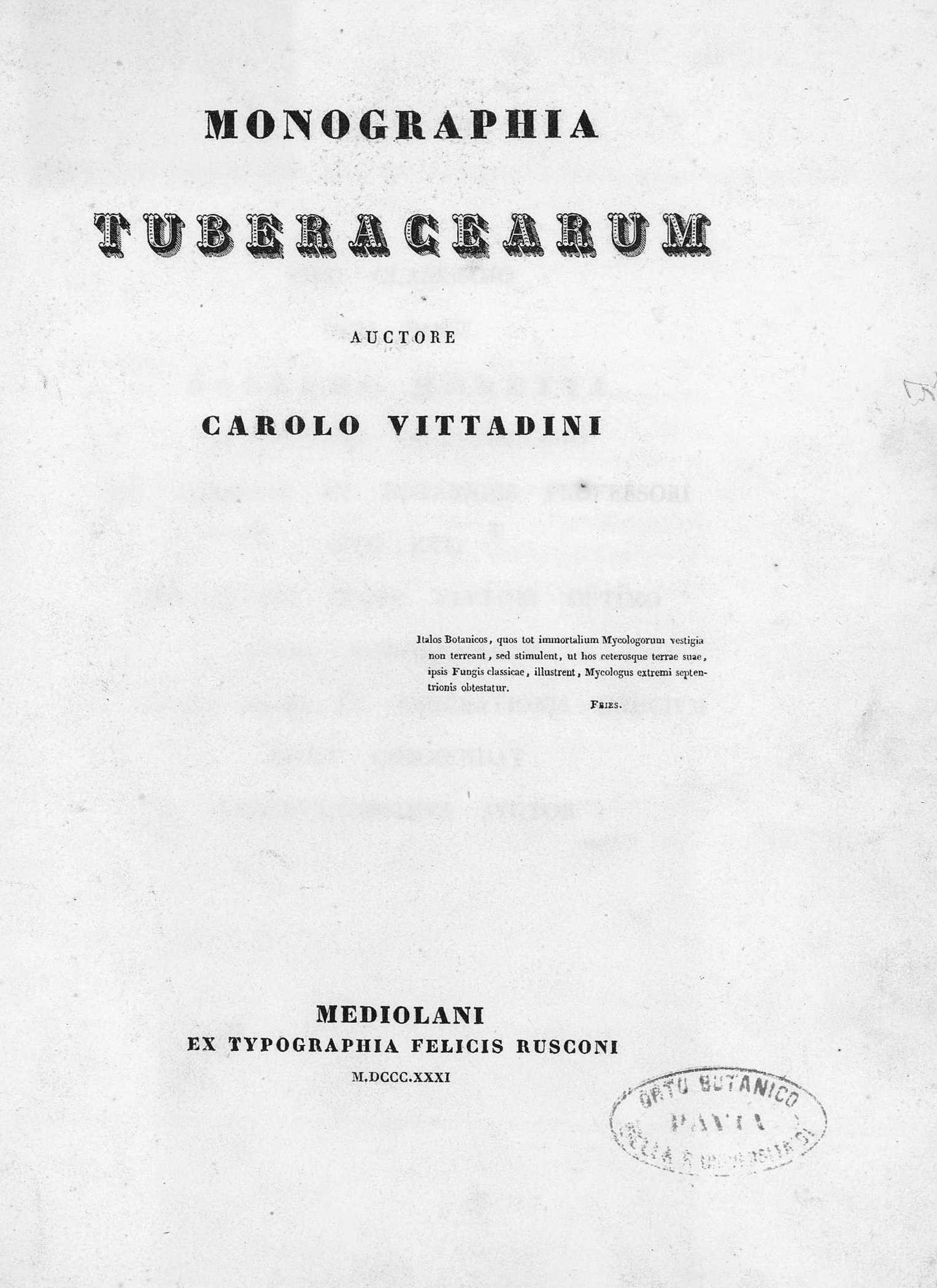
Monographia tuberacearum, 1831

- Monographia tuberacearum (in Latin). Milano: Felice Rusconi. 1831.
- Monographia tuberacearum (Rusconi, Milan, 1831) - Describes 65 species, of which 51 were new.
- Descrizione dei funghi mangerecci più comuni dell'Italia e de'velenosi che possono co'medesimi confondersi (1835) - Describes 56 species, of which 15 were new.
- Monographia Lycoperdineorum (1842) - Completes his 1831 study and describes 50 species, of which 23 were new.
- Trattato sui funghi mangerecci più conosciuti e paragoni con quelli velenosi con cui possono essere confusi (1844) - Written at the request of the Italian government, which was concerned over the number of incidents of mushrooms poisonings.

== Taxa described ==
- Agaricus silvicola
- Amanita echinocephala (Vittad.) Quel.
- The Shaggy parasol (Chlorophyllum rhacodes)
- Rhizopogon vulgaris
- Several species of Tuber
- Amanita vittadinii (Moretti) Vitt. is named in his honour.
