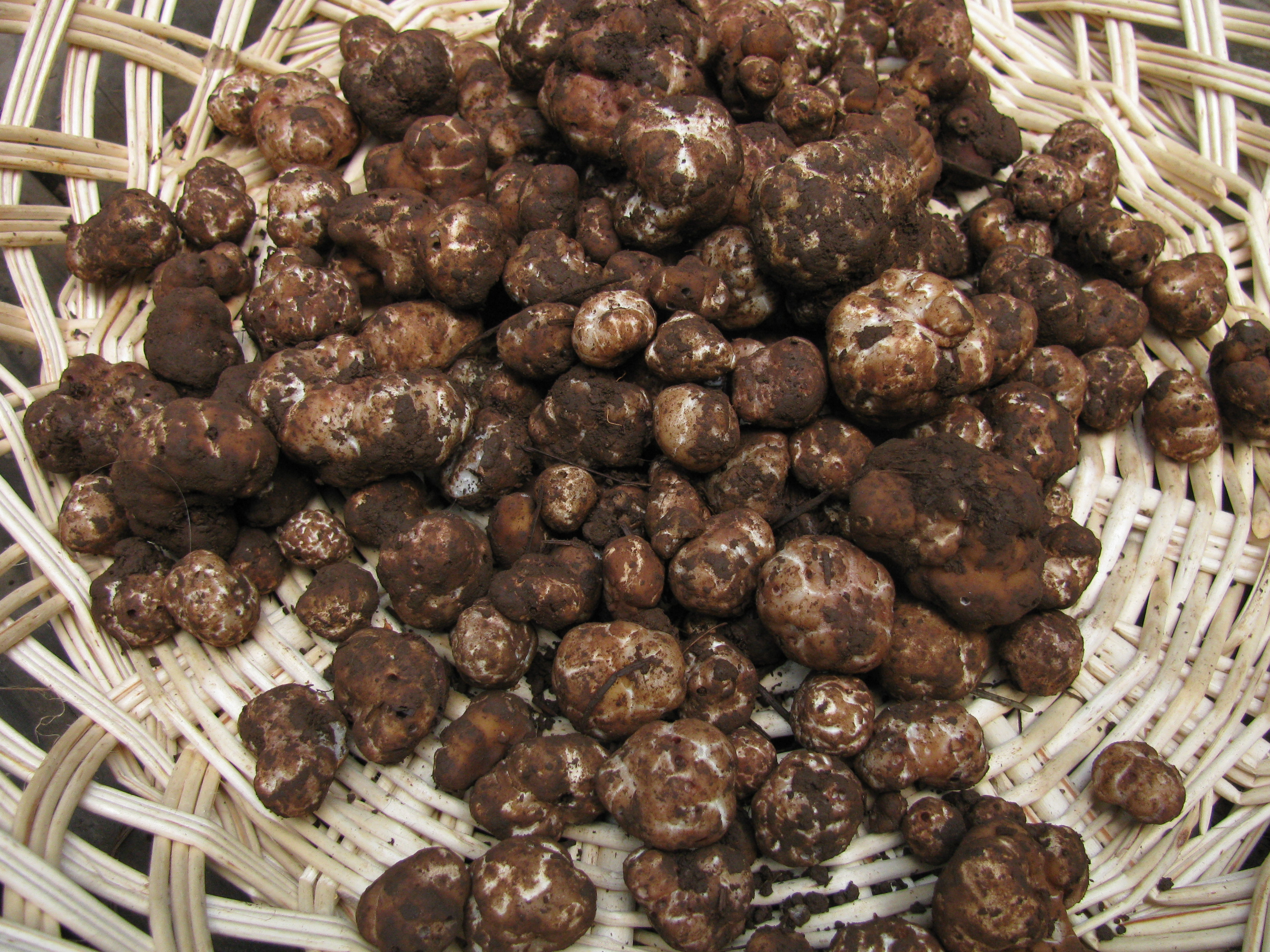
- Tuber gibbosum

Scientific classification
- Kingdom: Fungi
- Division: Ascomycota
- Class: Pezizomycetes
- Order: Pezizales
- Family: Tuberaceae
- Genus: Tuber; P.Micheli ex F.H.Wigg. (1780)

Type species
- Tuber aestivum (Wulfen) Spreng. (1827)

Synonyms
- List: Tuber P.Micheli; Tuberium Raf.; Aschion Wallr.; Ensaluta Zobel; Lespiaultinia Zobel; Oogaster Corda; Tuber subg. Vittadinion Zobel; Vittadinion Zobel; Terfeziopsis Harkn.; Delastreopsis Mattir.; Mukagomyces S.Imai

= Tuber (fungus) =

Genus of fungi

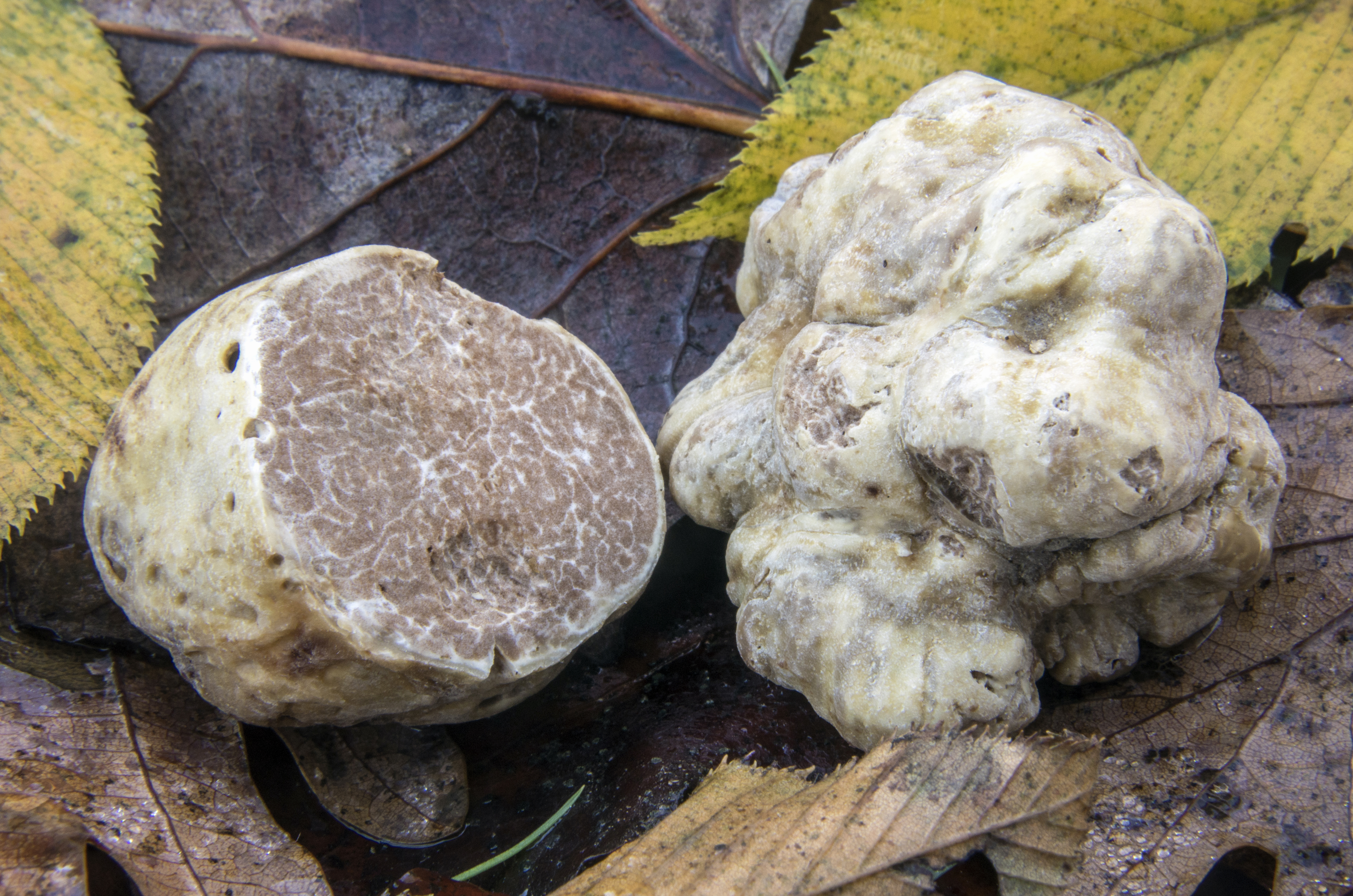
Harvested white truffle (Tuber magnatum) at Ceva, Cuneo, Italy

Tuber is a genus in the fungal family Tuberaceae, with estimated molecular dating to the end of the Jurassic period (156 Mya). It includes several species of truffles that are highly valued as delicacies.

Most (if not all) members have a ectomycorrhizal lifestyle.

== Economically important species ==
Europe:

- Black Périgord truffle, Tuber melanosporum (phylogroup Melanosporum)
- Black summer truffle, Tuber aestivum (phylogroup Aestivum)
- White truffle, Tuber magnatum (phylogroup Aestivum)
- Whitish truffle, Tuber borchii (phylogroup Puberulum)

Important Chinese exports:

- Chinese black (winter) truffle, Tuber indicum (technically sinense), a sister species of melanosporum (phylogroup Melanosporum)
- Chinese black summer truffle, Tuber sinoaestivum, the sister species of aestivum (phylogroup Aestivum)
- Tuber pseudohimalayense also known as T. pseudoexcavatum, commercialized in Europe (phylogroup Melanosporum)

== Mating ==
Until 2010, all truffle species were thought to be homothallic, that is, capable of sexual reproduction from a single organism. Subsequent research indicated that T. melanosporum is heterothallic; that is, sexual reproduction requires contact between the mycelia of different mating types. Outcrossing is also known for

The following are known to be heterothallic:

- Heterozygous ascospores with homozygous gleba/asci are observed in T. magnatum, T. melanosporum, T. aestivum, T. borchii, T. japonicum.
- Direct detection of different mating-type locus genes (usually MAT1-1-1 and MAT1-2-1) in T. melanosporum, T. indicum (complex), T. borchii, T. aestivum, T. himalayense, T. longispinosum, T. japonicum.

== Phylogeny ==
Relationship between Tuber Phylogroups

- - - - - - - - - Pubenlum
                - Leastisporum
              - Maculatum
            - Gibbosum
          - Macrosporum
        - Gennadii
      - - - Rufum
          - Melanosporum
        - - Aestivum
          - Excavatum
    - Tumericum
  - Labyrinthomyces
- Choiromyces

Fan et al., 2022 figure 1. Multigene maximum-likelihood phylogeny.

The phylogeny and biogeography of the genus Tuber was investigated in 2008 using internal transcribed spacers (ITS) of nuclear DNA and revealed five major clades (Aestivum, Excavatum, Rufum, Melanosporum and Puberulum); this was later improved and expanded in 2010 to nine major clades using 28S large subunits (LSU) rRNA of mitochondrial DNA. The Magnatum and Macrosporum clades were distinguished as distinct from the Aestivum clade. The Gibbosum clade was resolved as distinct from all other clades, and the Spinoreticulatum clade was separated from the Rufum clade.

== New discoveries ==
In 2015, a new species Tuber petrophilum (close relative to Tuber melanosporum and Tuber brumale) was discovered in Serbia within the Dinaric Alps. In 2018, two new species were discovered in Brazil. Tuber floridanum (with the commercial name Trufa Sapucaya meaning 'The last Guarany breath') and Tuber brennemanii grow in association with pecan rootlets.

== See also ==
- List of Tuber (fungus) species
