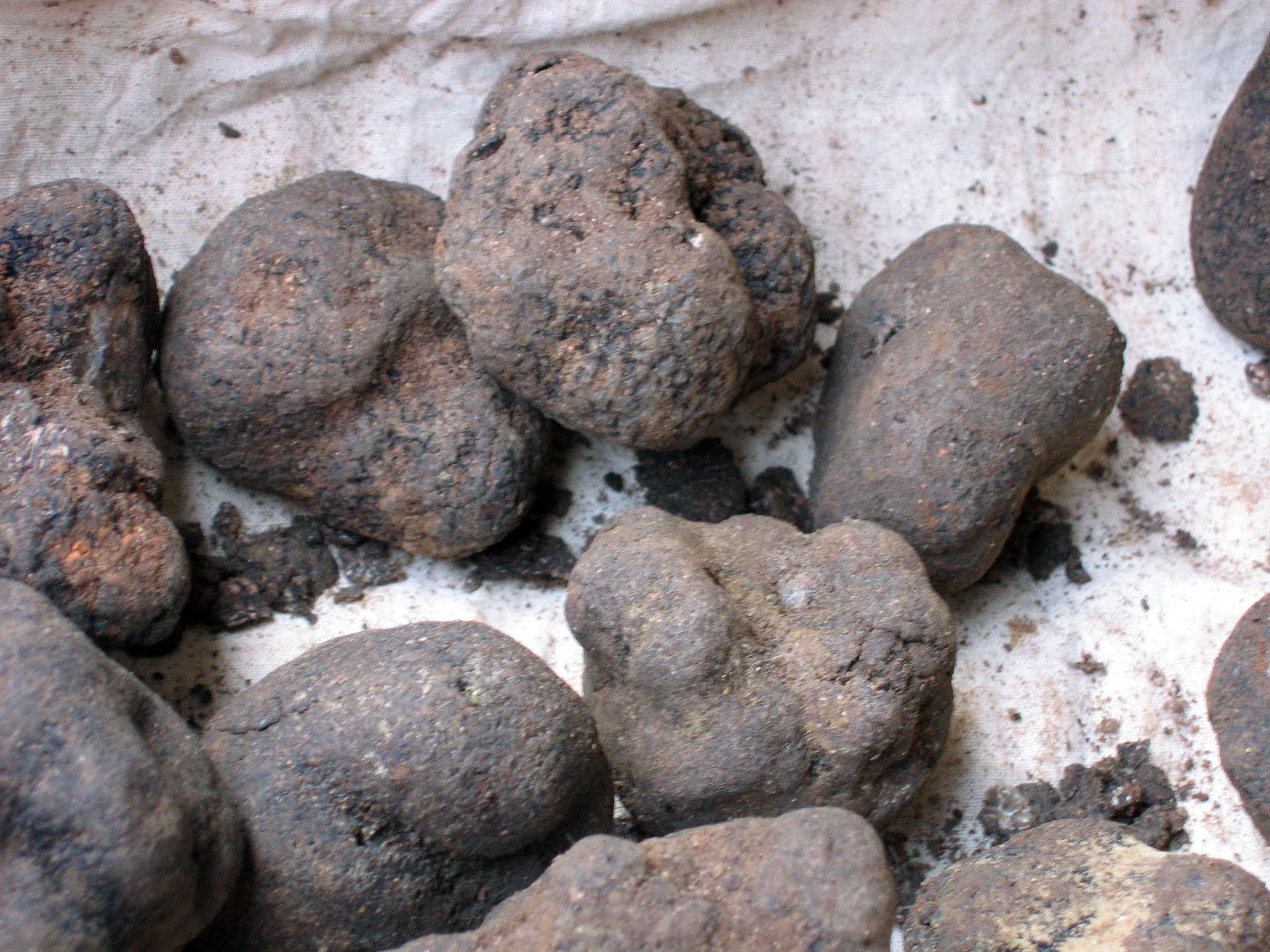

Scientific classification
- Kingdom: Fungi
- Division: Ascomycota
- Class: Pezizomycetes
- Order: Pezizales
- Family: Tuberaceae; Dumort. (1822)

Type genus
- Tuber P.Micheli ex F.H.Wigg. (1780)

Genera
- Choiromyces; Dingleya; Labyrinthomyces; Paradoxa; Reddellomyces; Tuber

= Tuberaceae =

Family of fungi

The Tuberaceae (/ˌtjuːbəˈreɪsii/) are a family of mycorrhizal fungi, in the order Pezizales, that evolved during or after the first major adaptive radiation of Angiosperms in the Jurassic period (140–180 million years ago, Mya). It includes the genus Tuber, which includes the so-called "true" truffles. It was characterized by the Belgian botanist Barthélemy Charles Joseph du Mortier in 1822. A molecular study of ribosomal DNA by mycologist Kerry O'Donnell in 1997 found that a small clade now redefined as Helvellaceae is most closely related to the Tuberaceae. The mycologist Mary Cloyd Burnley Stifler studied and described this fungal family, donating specimens to herbariums across the United States.
