= Pan-American Highway =

Network of roads in the Americas

Pan–American Highway
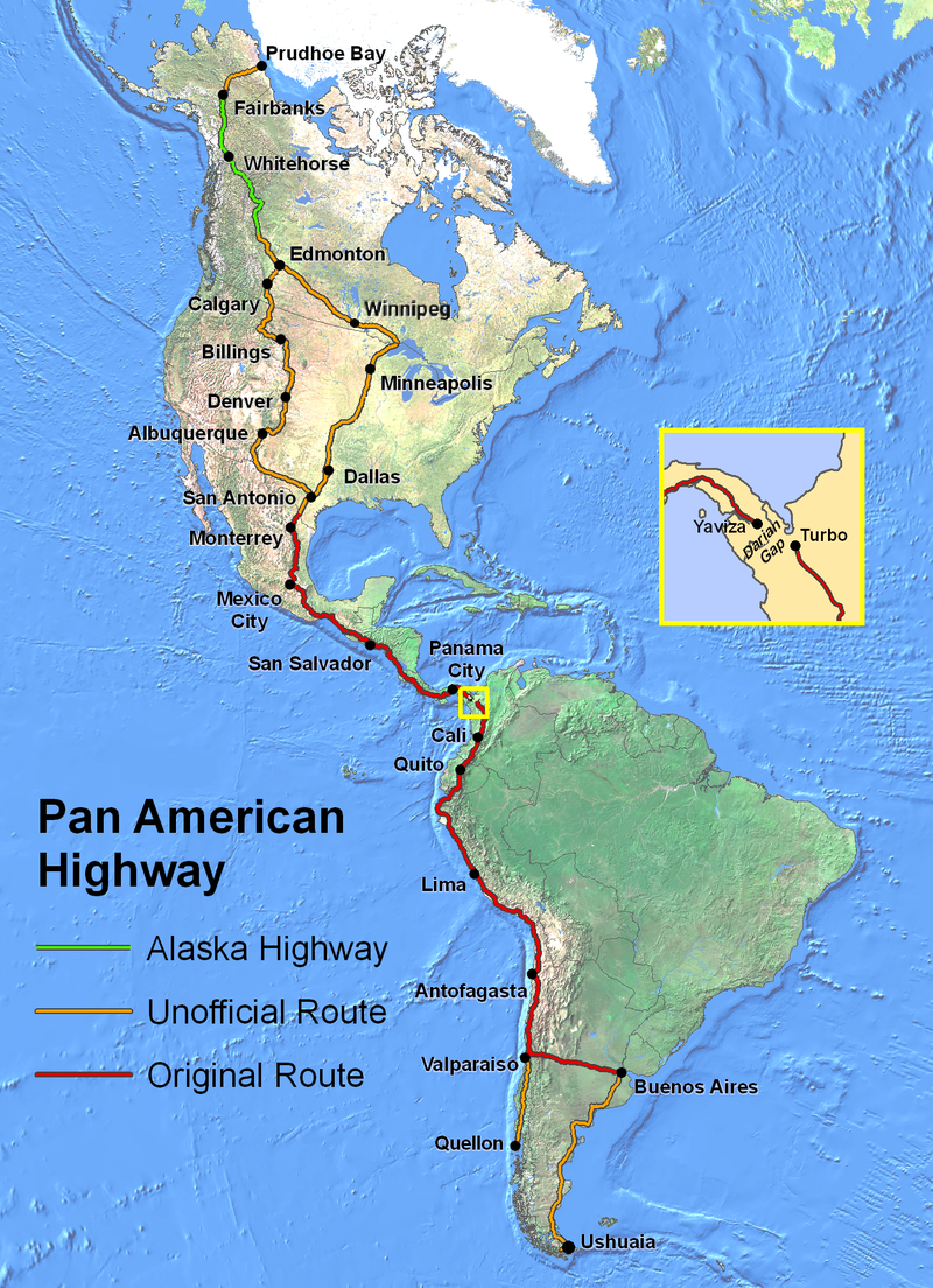
- The Pan-American Highway from Prudhoe Bay, United States, to Quellón, Chile, and Ushuaia, Argentina, with official and unofficial routes shown in Mexico and Central and South America. A few selected unofficial routes are shown through the United States and Canada as they existed in the early 1960s. In 1966, the new U.S. Interstate Highway System brought official status to most previously unofficial routes in the contiguous United States.

North American segment
- North end: Prudhoe Bay, United States
- South end: Yaviza, Panama

South American segment
- North end: Turbo, Colombia
- South end: Ushuaia, Argentina

Location
- Countries: North America: United States, Canada, Mexico, Guatemala, El Salvador, Honduras, Nicaragua, Costa Rica, Panama; South America: Colombia, Ecuador, Peru, Chile, Argentina

Highway system
- Pan-American Highway system

The Pan-American Highway is a vast network of roads that stretches about 30,000 kilometers (19,000 mi) from Prudhoe Bay, Alaska, United States, in the northernmost part of North America, to Ushuaia, Argentina, at the southern tip of South America. The highway connects 14 countries: Canada, the United States, Mexico, Guatemala, El Salvador, Honduras, Nicaragua, Costa Rica, Panama, Colombia, Ecuador, Peru, Chile, and Argentina.

No road in the U.S. (except Alaska) or Canada is officially designated as part of the Pan-American Highway, which officially begins at the Mexico–United States border in Nuevo Laredo and runs south.

The Pan-American Highway is interrupted at the Darién Gap, a roadless, dense rainforest area between Panama and Colombia. No road traverses the Gap, and no car ferries have operated in the area for decades; drivers often opt to send their car by cargo ship from one country to the other. North and South America are separated by this 106km (66 mi) gap.

== Concept of the highway ==
The highway was built in stages. The first, not long after one could drive across the United States on a paved road, was the highway from Laredo, Texas, to Mexico City. The second stage was the Inter-American Highway to Panama City; previously there were no roads, and little commerce between most Central American countries. There was no road between Costa Rica and Panama until, concerned about access to the Panama Canal in a war situation, the U.S. Army Corps of Engineers began a highway in 1941.

The third stage, which has not been completed and may never be, continues onward to the southern tip of South America at Tierra del Fuego National Park, near Ushuaia, Argentina. Both Panama and Colombia, as well as environmentalists, are opposed to building a highway through the Darién Gap that separates the two continents.

A Cuban proposal that was not carried out was to include a "circuito del Caribe" (Caribbean circuit). This would have expanded the highway to Puerto Juárez, Mexico (Cancún), and from there by ferry to Pinar del Río, Cuba, from there by road to Havana, and by ferry again to Key West, Florida, and the Overseas Highway. The deterioration of relations between Cuba and the U.S. after the Cuban Revolution of 1959 ended talk of this project.

== Development and construction ==
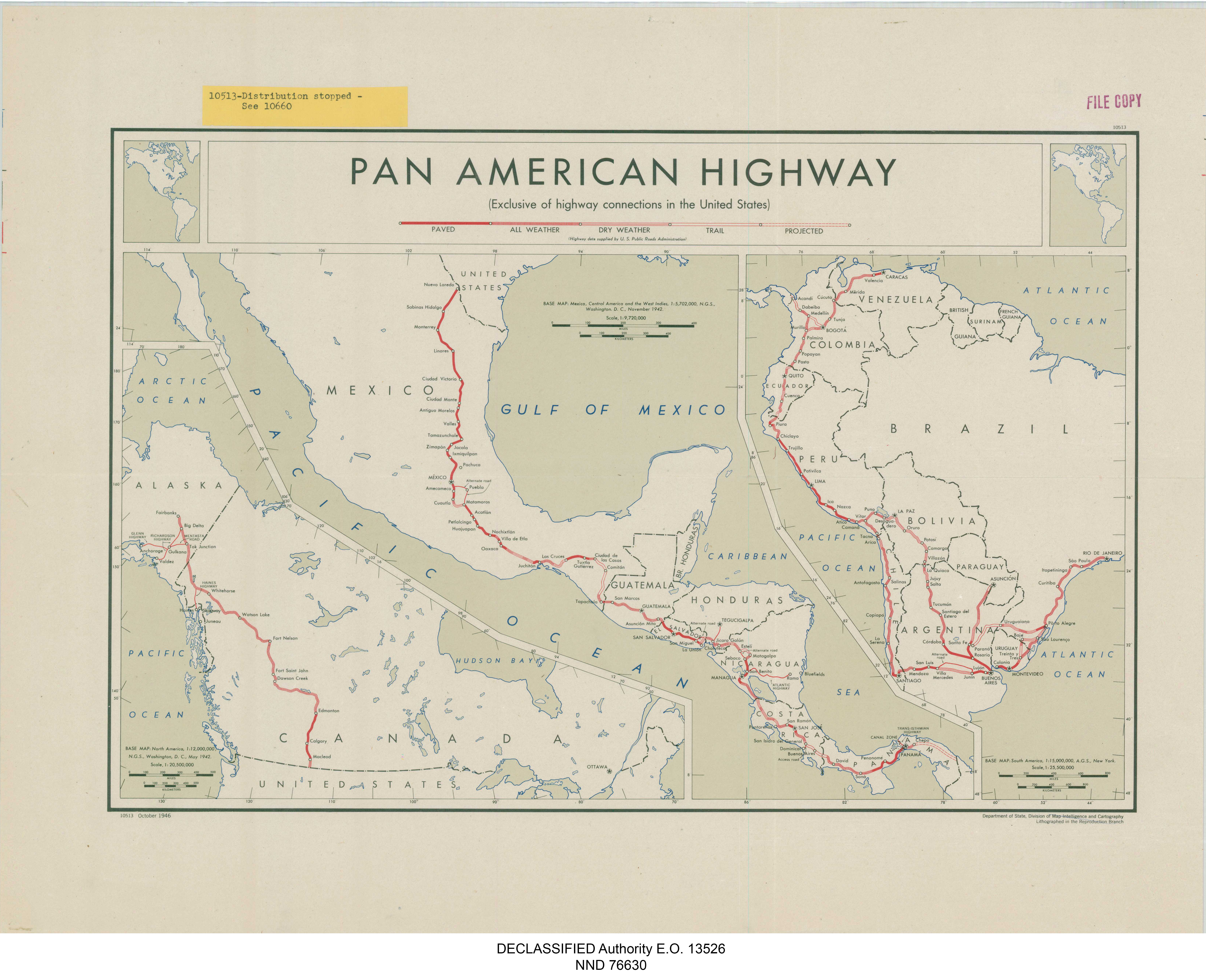
1946 map of the Pan-American Highway (outside the United States)

The concept of an overland route from one tip of the Americas to the other was originally proposed as a railroad. In 1884 the U.S. Congress passed a law with a plan to build an inter-American rail system. This was discussed at the First Pan-American Conference in 1889; however, construction never started. It was abandoned in concept after the independence of Panama in 1903, when work on the canal began.

The concept of building a highway, rather than a railroad, emerged at the Fifth International Conference of American States in 1923, after the automobile and other vehicles had begun to replace railroads for both passenger and goods transportation. The first conference regarding the construction of the highway opened in Buenos Aires on October 3, 1925.

Finally, on July 29, 1937, in the latter years of the Great Depression, Argentina, Bolivia, Chile, Colombia, Costa Rica, El Salvador, Guatemala, Honduras, Mexico, Nicaragua, Panama, Peru, Canada, and the United States signed the Convention on the Pan-American Highway, whereby they agreed to achieve speedy construction, by all adequate means. Thirteen years later, in 1950, Mexico became the first Latin American country to complete its portion of the highway.

No single route in the United States (except in Alaska) has been designated, much less marked, as the U.S. portion of the Pan-American Highway. However, I-25 is labeled as the Pan-American freeway in states such as New Mexico and Colorado. According to the federal Department of Transportation, the Interstate Highway System is the United States' section of the highway. In Canada the highway is not marked. Much of the highway in Latin America is marked as Vía Panam or Vía Panamericana.

== Countries served ==
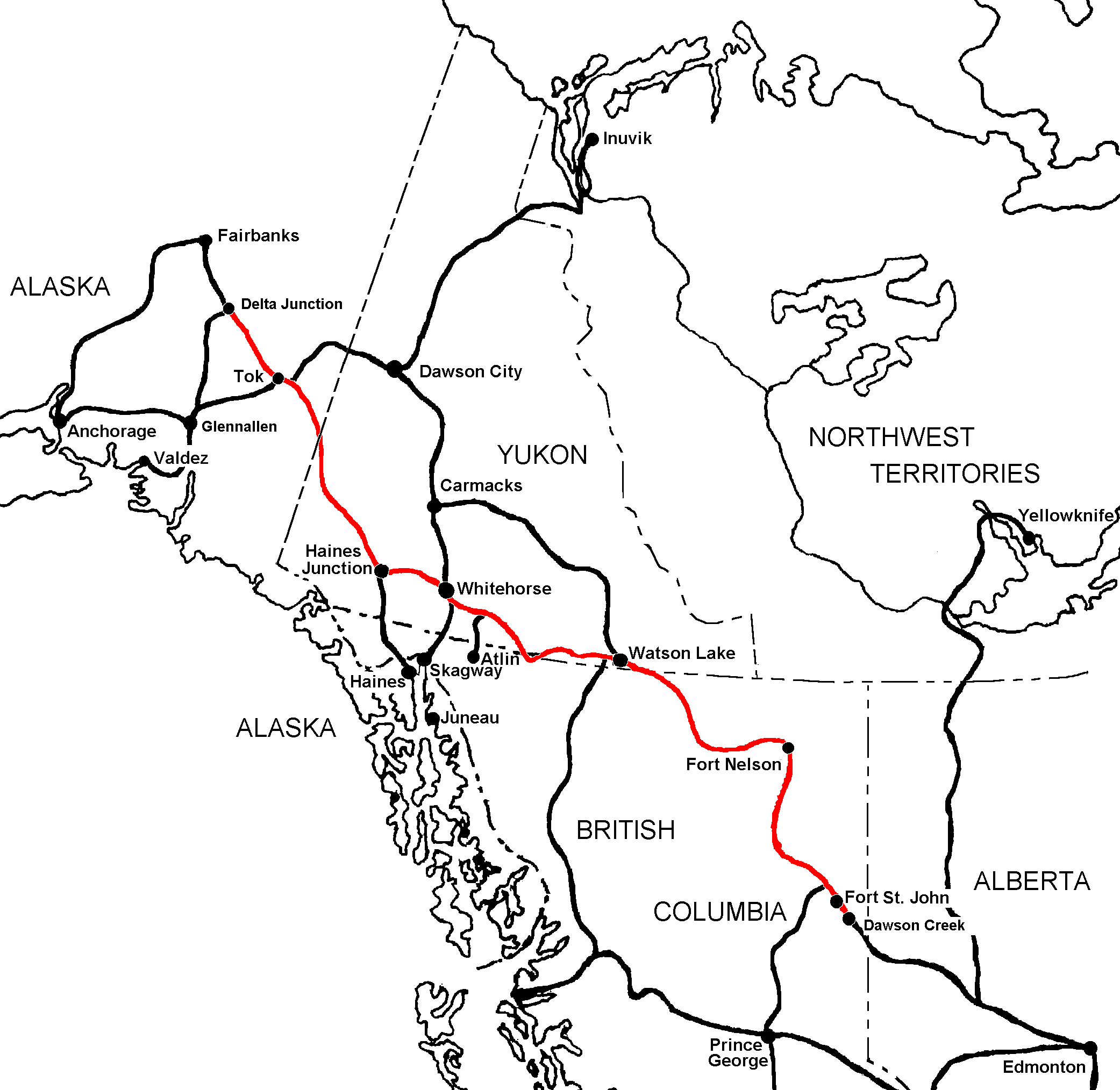
Map of the Alaska Highway portion (in red) of the Pan-American Highway system.

The Northern Pan-American Highway travels through nine countries, including in Central America:

- Canada (CANAMEX Corridor unofficial)
- United States (Interstate Highway System official)
- Mexico
- Guatemala
- El Salvador
- Honduras
- Nicaragua
- Costa Rica
- Panama

The Southern Pan-American Highway travels through five countries:

- Colombia
- Ecuador
- Peru
- Chile
- Argentina

Important spurs also connect with four other South American countries:

- Bolivia
- Brazil
- Paraguay
- Uruguay

== Northern section ==
=== Alaska ===
The Alaska Highway through Alaska, Yukon and British Columbia is commonly considered a de facto northerly extension of the Pan-American Highway, which continues further north with the Dalton Highway in Alaska. With this route, the Pan-American Highway begins in Prudhoe Bay, near Deadhorse. Traveling south, the route follows the length of the Dalton Highway (Alaska Route 11) changing to Alaska Route 2, the Alaskan portion of the Alaska Highway, near Fairbanks, Alaska. From Fairbanks, the route follows Alaska Route 2 southeast to the Canada–United States border southeast of Northway, Alaska, and adjacent to the Tetlin National Wildlife Refuge.

=== Canada ===
In Canada, no particular road has been officially designated as the Pan-American Highway. The National Highway System, which includes but is not limited to the Trans-Canada Highway, is the country's only official inter-provincial highway system. However, several Canadian highways are a natural extension of several key American highways that reach the Canada–US border. British Columbia Highway 97 and Highway 2 to Alberta both pick up where the southern end of the Alaska highway leaves off. Highway 97 becomes U.S. Route 97 at the Canada–US border. British Columbia Highway 99 provides an alternate route from Highway 97 just north of Cache Creek; it runs through Whistler and Vancouver before ending at the Canada–US border at the north end of Interstate 5 in Washington state, the beginning of the official Pan-American route south of British Columbia. Meanwhile, Alberta Highway 2 runs south and east to Alberta Highway 3 leading into Lethbridge, then south on Alberta Highway 4 to the Canada–US border, where it becomes Interstate 15 in Montana. This is the first official stretch of the Pan-American Highway south of the Alberta route, both of which are also part of the CANAMEX Corridor.

==== Yukon ====
Crossing the border into Canada, Alaska Highway 2 turns into Yukon Highway 1. The first significant settlement along the way is Beaver Creek, Yukon. At Haines Junction, where it meets Yukon Highway 3, Yukon Highway 1 turns east toward Whitehorse, the capital of the Yukon Territory.

Through most of Whitehorse, Yukon Highway 2 and Yukon Highway 1 share an alignment. Yukon Highway 1 cuts southeast toward Marsh Lake, Yukon while Yukon Highway 2 cuts south to Skagway, Alaska. Eventually, Yukon Highway 1 intersects with Yukon Highway 8 and Yukon Highway 7 at Jake's Corner, Yukon; the Pan-American Highway continues on Yukon 1 east-northeast from this junction.

At Johnson's Crossing, Yukon Highway 1 meets Yukon Highway 6 and travels southeast through Teslin, Yukon. The Pan-American Highway continues on Yukon 1 as it crosses over into British Columbia (B. C.). After several miles, the Highway reenters the Yukon (once again as Highway 1) and continues southeast of Watson Lake until it, once again, enters British Columbia as B.C. Highway 97.

==== British Columbia ====
After travelling about 8 km (5 mi) past the British Columbia–Yukon border, the Pan-American Highway reaches the first settlement in British Columbia at Lower Post. After travelling about 32 km (20 mi) east, the highway once again re-enters the Yukon for roughly 8 mi (13 km). The Highway then re-enters British Columbia (as BC 97) for the final time. The Pan-American Highway continues south to southeast through a long uninhabited stretch until it passes through the villages of Fireside and Coal River, then runs east parallel to the Liard River.

The Pan-American Highway continues on B.C. Highway 97 as it passes through Toad River Post, and then Summit Lake, which is nested between Stone Mountain and Mount Saint George. Further down the road, B.C. Highway 97 intersects with B.C. Highway 77; the Pan-American Highway continues along B.C. 97 east to Fort Nelson.

From Fort Nelson, the Highway travels south for about 290 km (180 mi) until it reaches Fort St. John. It continues on B.C. Highway 97 southeast for another 60 km (37 mi) to reach the end of the Alaska Highway at Dawson Creek.

==== Alberta ====
After B.C Highway 97, the unofficial route becomes Alberta Highway 43. In approximately 7.2 km (4.5 mi), Highway 43 enters into the first settlement, Demmitt. For about 75 km (47 mi), Highway 43 goes into Grande Prairie. At Clairmont, Highway 43, turns to Alberta Highway 2, Highway 43 goes left. Highway 43 goes for 455 km (283 mi) before reaching Edmonton. The unofficial route turns two ways, one way goes to Lloydminster, Minneapolis, and Dallas and merges with the second way. The second way goes to Calgary and the US border.

=== Contiguous United States ===
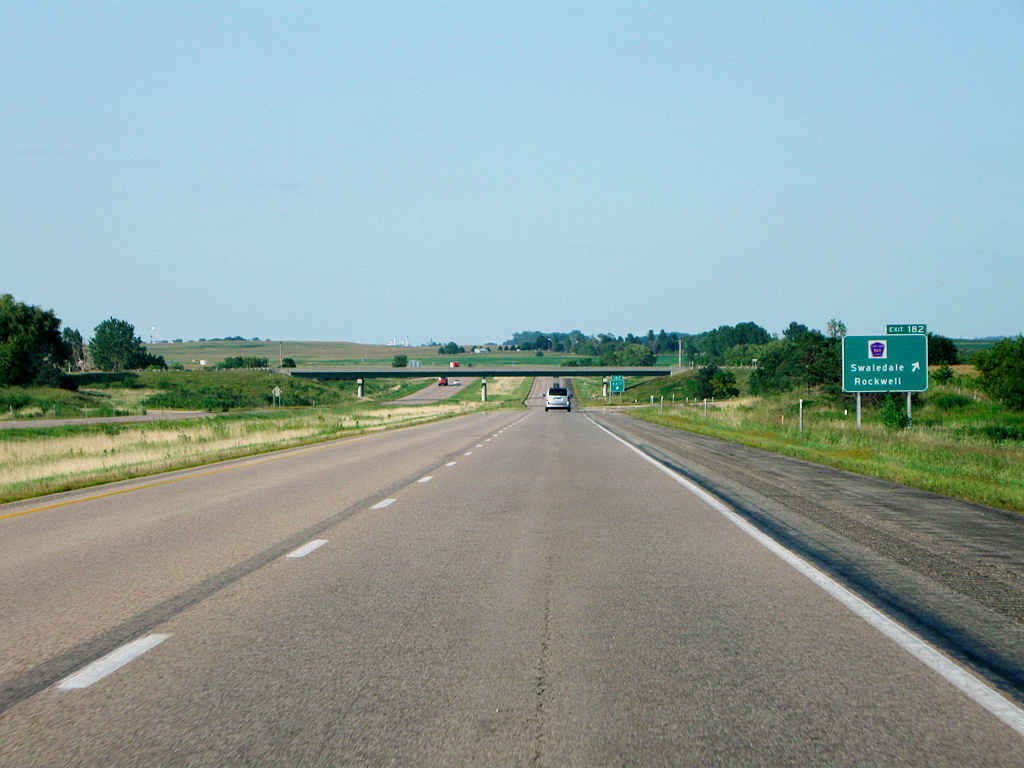
Interstate 35 in the U.S. state of Iowa. I-35 is a de facto branch of the Pan-American Highway.

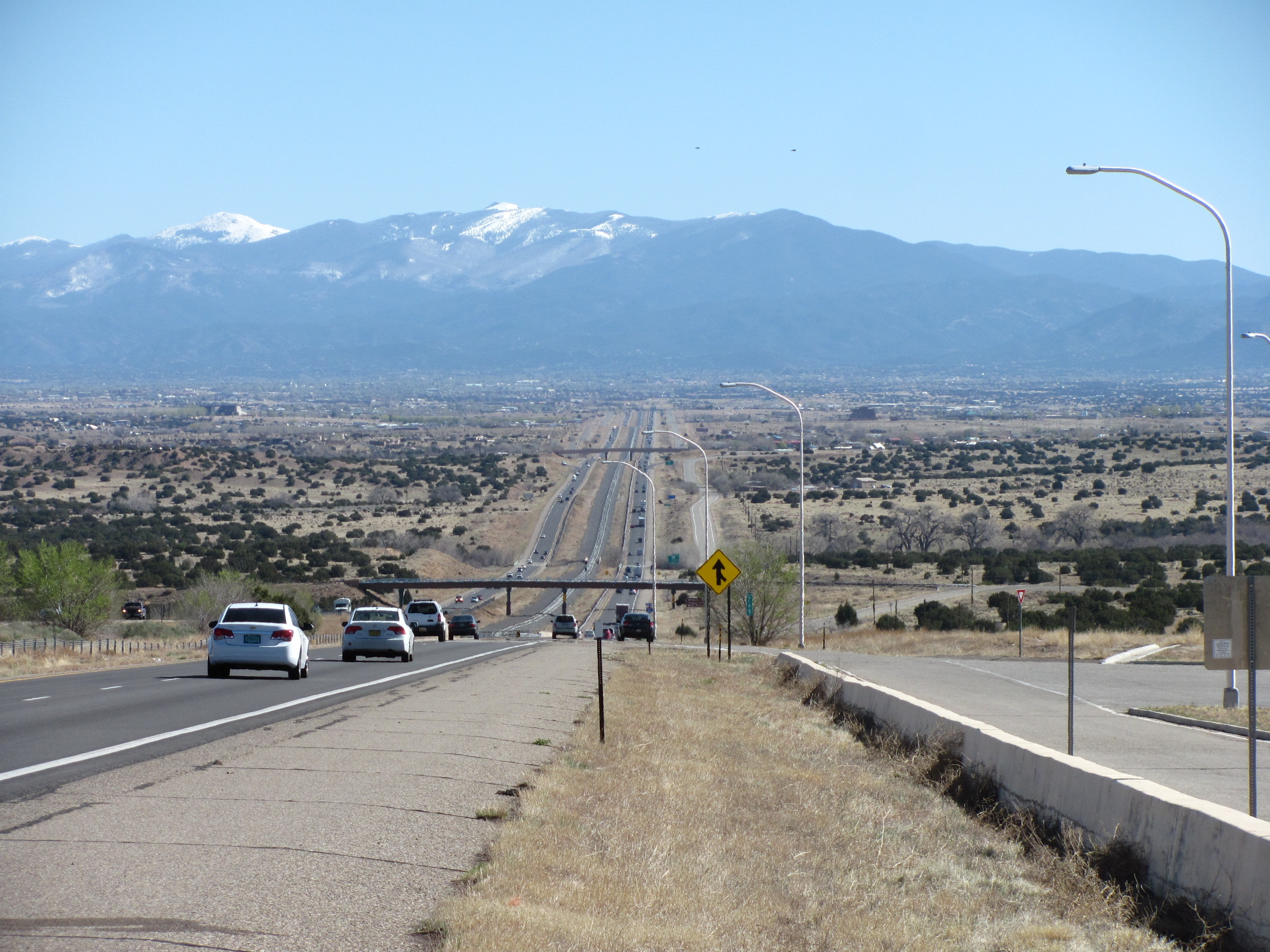
Interstate 25 in the U.S. state of New Mexico. I-25 is part of the other de facto branch, and is signed "Pan-American Freeway" in Albuquerque.

In 1966, the U.S. Federal Highway Administration designated the entire Interstate Highway System as part of the Pan-American Highway System, but this has not been expressed in any of the official interstate signage. Of the many freeways that make up this comprehensive system, several are notable because of their mainly north–south orientation and their links to the main Mexican route and its spurs, as well as to key routes in Canada that link to the Alaska Highway.

These include the following:

- Interstate 5 runs north from the Mexican border in San Diego, California, to Blaine, Washington, south of Vancouver, British Columbia, then links indirectly with British Columbia Highway 99 north of the Canada–US border. A technically direct link between the same interstate and the U.S. Route 97 system can be found near Weed, California. US Route 97 runs northeast then north through Oregon and Washington from this junction, and becomes BC Highway 97 at the border with Canada.
- Interstate 15 links San Diego with Alberta Highway 2 that eventually crosses into British Columbia and ends at the southern terminus of the Alaska Highway. Interstate 8 provides an east–west link from San Diego to Interstate 10 near Phoenix, Arizona. The latter continues to Tucson and links with Interstate 19, which becomes a spur of the Pan-American highway through Mexico at the Nogales border crossing.
- Interstate 25 runs north from Interstate 10 at Las Cruces, New Mexico, to Interstate 90 in Buffalo, Wyoming. This route has no direct extension into Canada but links indirectly to Interstate 15. Interstate 25 in Albuquerque, New Mexico, was named the Pan-American Freeway, as an extension of Highway 45, the Mexican spur linking El Paso to the original route along highway 85 north of Mexico City. This portion of I-25 largely follows the historic Camino Real, and thus serves a culturally significant portion of the Pan American system. Like I-15, the complete route of Interstate 25 is an official northerly continuation toward Alberta, where Highway 2 provides a direct but unofficial Canadian link to the Alaska Highway.
- Interstate 35 is a northerly continuation of the original Pan-American highway following Mexican Federal Highway 85. It extends from Laredo, Texas to the Canada–United States border north of Duluth, Minnesota, with a spur, Interstate 29, that leads farther west toward Winnipeg, Manitoba. The section of Interstate 35 in San Antonio, Texas, is referred to as the Pan Am Expressway by locals. I-35 is a northerly continuation of Mexico Highway 85, the original official Mexican route, ending in Duluth, Minnesota, where Minnesota State Highway 61 continues to the Canada–US border near Thunder Bay, Ontario. This route was first proposed in a 1932 bill introduced in the U.S. Congress. The Trans-Canada Highway provides a link from Winnipeg and Thunder Bay to Alberta and the Alaska Highway, but it is not officially part of the Pan-American Highway.
- U.S. Route 81 is claimed to be part of the Pan American Highway from Wichita, Kansas, to Watertown, South Dakota, where it runs separately from Interstate 29.
- An additional route only partially complete is Interstate 69, which will eventually run northeasterly from the Laredo Nuevo Laredo border crossing to the Windsor–Quebec City Corridor in Canada, where the route becomes unofficial.

=== Related North American highways ===
Several North American routes have names that make no direct reference to the Pan-American Highway, in part because some sections follow highways that are not up to full freeway standard.

- The CANAMEX Corridor is designated from Mexico City to the western United States from Arizona to Montana, and continues north into western Canada. Although lacking any official status for the Pan American Highway in Canada, this is the only official North American highway that runs through Canada, the U.S., and Mexico to link the Alaska Highway with the Pan-American Highway at Mexico City. Unlike corresponding Pan American routes in the American southwest, the Canamex Highway bypasses San Diego by using several non-interstate highways to provide a shortcut from I-15 at Las Vegas, Nevada to I-10 at Phoenix, Arizona for traffic accessing I-15 from the Nogales border crossing.
- The CanAm Highway follows Interstate 25 from El Paso to U.S. Route 85 north of Denver, Colorado, then continues into the Canadian province of Saskatchewan, following parts of provincial highways 35, 39, 6, 3, and 2 in succession before terminating at La Ronge. This route was first proposed during the 1920s, but was never properly promoted or developed. A section of the CanAm in southern Saskatchewan has deteriorated to the point where it is no longer a paved highway.
- The NAFTA Superhighway tag has been unofficially used in connection with Interstate 35 from Laredo, Texas to the Canadian border; there it downgrades to a non-freeway route ending at Thunder Bay, Ontario. A spur follows Interstate 29 to the border, where it also downgrades to an arterial highway that extends to Winnipeg, Manitoba. The NAFTA highway sometimes unofficially includes Interstate 69, which is mostly complete from western Kentucky to the Canada–US border at Port Huron, Michigan. In Canada, Ontario Highway 402 and other freeways in the Quebec City–Windsor Corridor can be considered a northeastward extension of this version of the NAFTA superhighway. To the southwest, from western Kentucky to the Mexican border, there is no single superhighway yet completed. Pending completion of I-69, the main highway links to Mexico follow parts of US routes 45 and 51 from Kentucky to western Tennessee, I-155 into Missouri, parts of Interstates 55 and 40 from Missouri to Arkansas, and I-30 to the Texas stretch of I-35 that continues to the Mexican border at Laredo, Texas. The section of I-69 to be completed south of Kentucky is expected eventually to continue southwestward to the Texas Gulf Coast. It will have a spur linking to the original Pan-American route through Mexico to Laredo, and additional branches extending to the Mexican spurs that cross the border at Pharr, Texas, and Brownsville, Texas.

=== Mexico ===
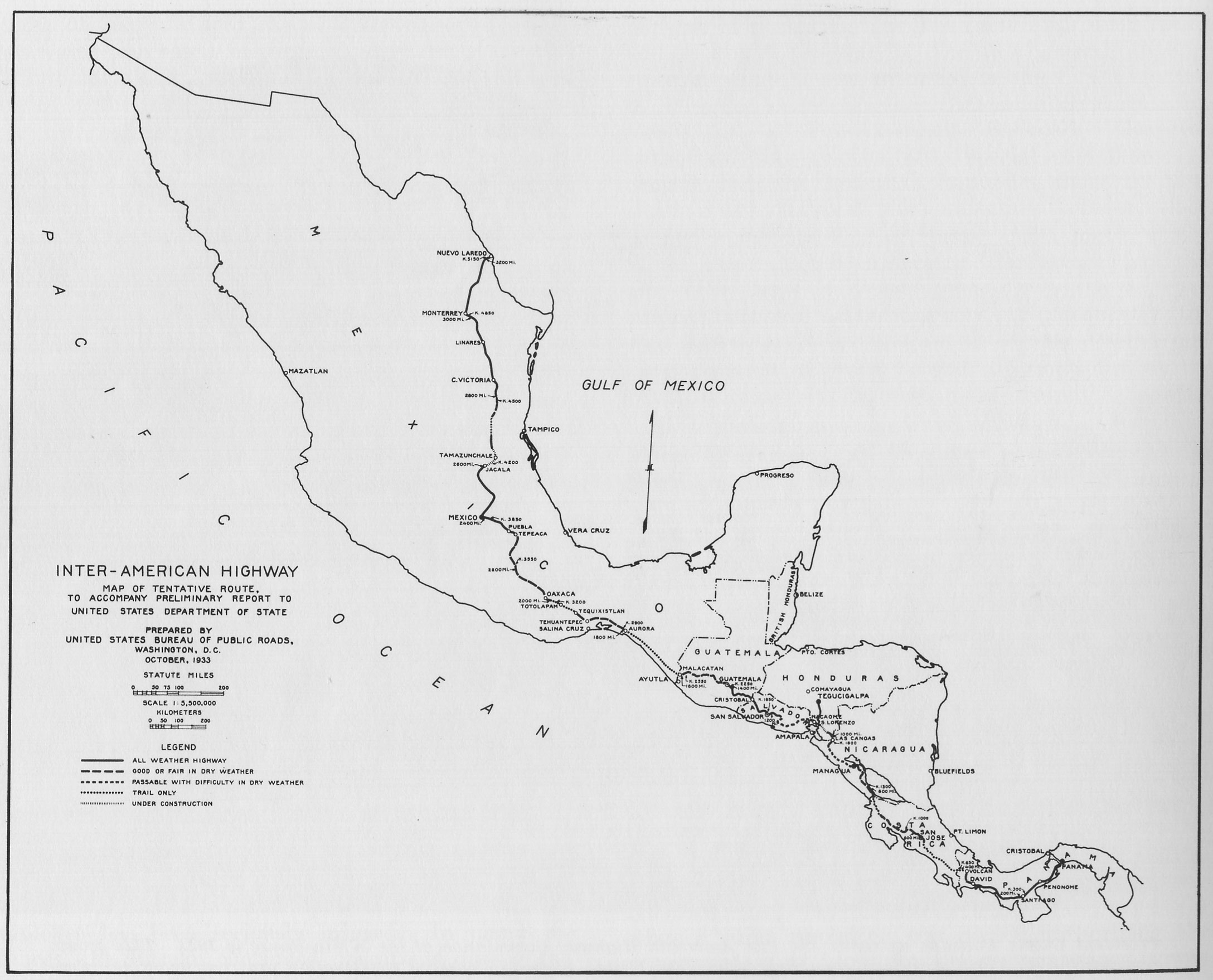
1933 map of the Inter-American Highway portion of the Pan-American Highway.

The official route of the Pan-American Highway through Mexico (where it is known as the Inter-American Highway) starts at Nuevo Laredo, Tamaulipas (opposite Laredo, Texas), and goes south to Mexico City along Mexican Federal Highway 85.

An alternative route begins at the border crossing between San Diego, California and Tijuana, Baja California. Interstate 5 in the United States connects to Mexican Federal Highway 1 at the busiest international border crossing in the world. The Pan-American Highway continues south to Mexico City along two separate routes: historic Mexican Federal Highway 1 and toll Mexican Federal Highway 1D via Baja California Peninsula or Mexican Federal Highway 2 via the mainland.

The Pan-American Highway (as Mexico Highway 85D) enters Mexico City, but downtown Mexico City can be bypassed using Mexico Highway 136 (a divided limited-access route) and Mexico Highway 115, which reconnects to Mexico Highway 95D south of the Mexican Federal District.

Later branches were built to the border as follows:

- Nogales spur – Mexican Federal Highway 15 from Mexico City
- El Paso spur – Mexican Federal Highway 45 from Highway 85 north of Mexico City to Ciudad Juárez, Chihuahua
- Eagle Pass spur – unknown, possibly Mexican Federal Highway 57 from Mexico City to Piedras Negras, Coahuila
- Pharr spur – Mexican Federal Highway 40 from Monterrey to Reynosa, Tamaulipas
- Brownsville spur – Mexican Federal Highway 101 from Ciudad Victoria to Matamoros, Tamaulipas

From Mexico City to the border with Guatemala, the highway follows Mexican Federal Highway 190. In the inaugural Carrera Panamericana road race, organized by the Mexican government, the terminus of this southern route was said to be at Ciudad Cuauhtémoc, Chiapas, at the Guatemalan border.

Specifically, as the Pan-American Highway continues south of Mexico City, it runs through the city of Cuernavaca about 48 km (30 mi) south of the Mexican capital. Here, the Pan-American Highway heads east along Federal Highway 190 through the state of Puebla; for about 32 km (20 mi), it is a limited-access divided highway. The route then reverts to an undivided highway and enters the state of Oaxaca. From Huajuapan de León to the Oaxaca state capital of Oaxaca is about 140 km (87 mi).

From the city of Oaxaca, the Highway continues southeast as Mexico Highway 190 for about 230 km (140 mi) to the village of Juchitán de Zaragoza. The Pan-American Highway is now in southern Mexico, which is a combination of small mountains, hills, and jungles. It is another 90 km (56 mi) to the border with the state of Chiapas where the Highway crosses the Continental Divide. From the Oaxaca–Chiapas state border, it is 160 km (99 mi) to the Chiapas state capital of Tuxtla Gutiérrez. The Highway then crosses the Mexico–Guatemala border at Ciudad Cuauhtémoc.

=== Central America ===
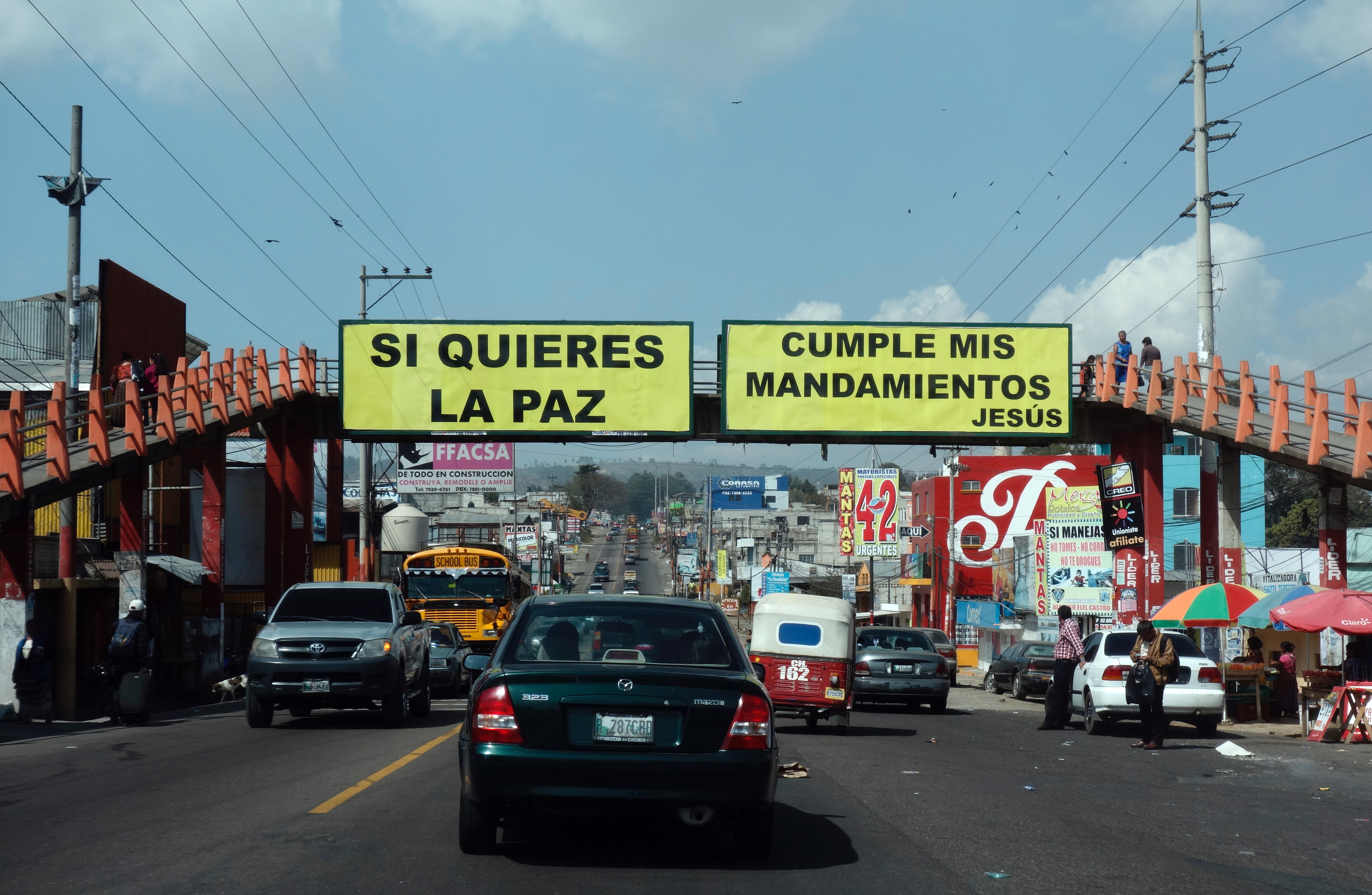
Pan-American Highway in Chimaltenango (Guatemala), 2015.

The Pan-American (or Inter-American) highway passes through the Central American countries with the highway designation of CA-1 (Central American Highway 1). Belize was supposedly included in the route at one time, after it switched to driving on the right. Before independence, as British Honduras, it was the only Central American country to drive on the left side of the road.

==== Guatemala ====
Upon crossing into Guatemala, Mexico Highway 190 becomes Central America Highway 1 and continues for about 80 km (50 mi) from the border village of La Mesilla to the city of Huehuetenango near the Maya ruins of Zaculeu. The Pan-American Highway crosses the Continental Divide again and into the Sierra de los Cuchumatanes mountains.

From Huehuetenango to Chimaltenango is roughly 160 km (99 mi) with Mayan ruins at Iximché, just north of Tecpán Guatemala. From Chimaltenango, it is about 35 to 40 km (22 to 25 mi) to Guatemala City, as a divided highway.

From Guatemala City to Cuilapa it is only partially a divided highway for 50 km (31 mi) and another 55 km (34 mi) to Jutiapa. The highway continues as CA Highway 1 and approaches the border with El Salvador. It is 50 km (31 mi) to the border crossing at San Cristobal Frontera.

In Guatemala, the Pan-American highway passes through 10 departments, including The Department of Guatemala, where it passes through Guatemala City.

==== El Salvador ====
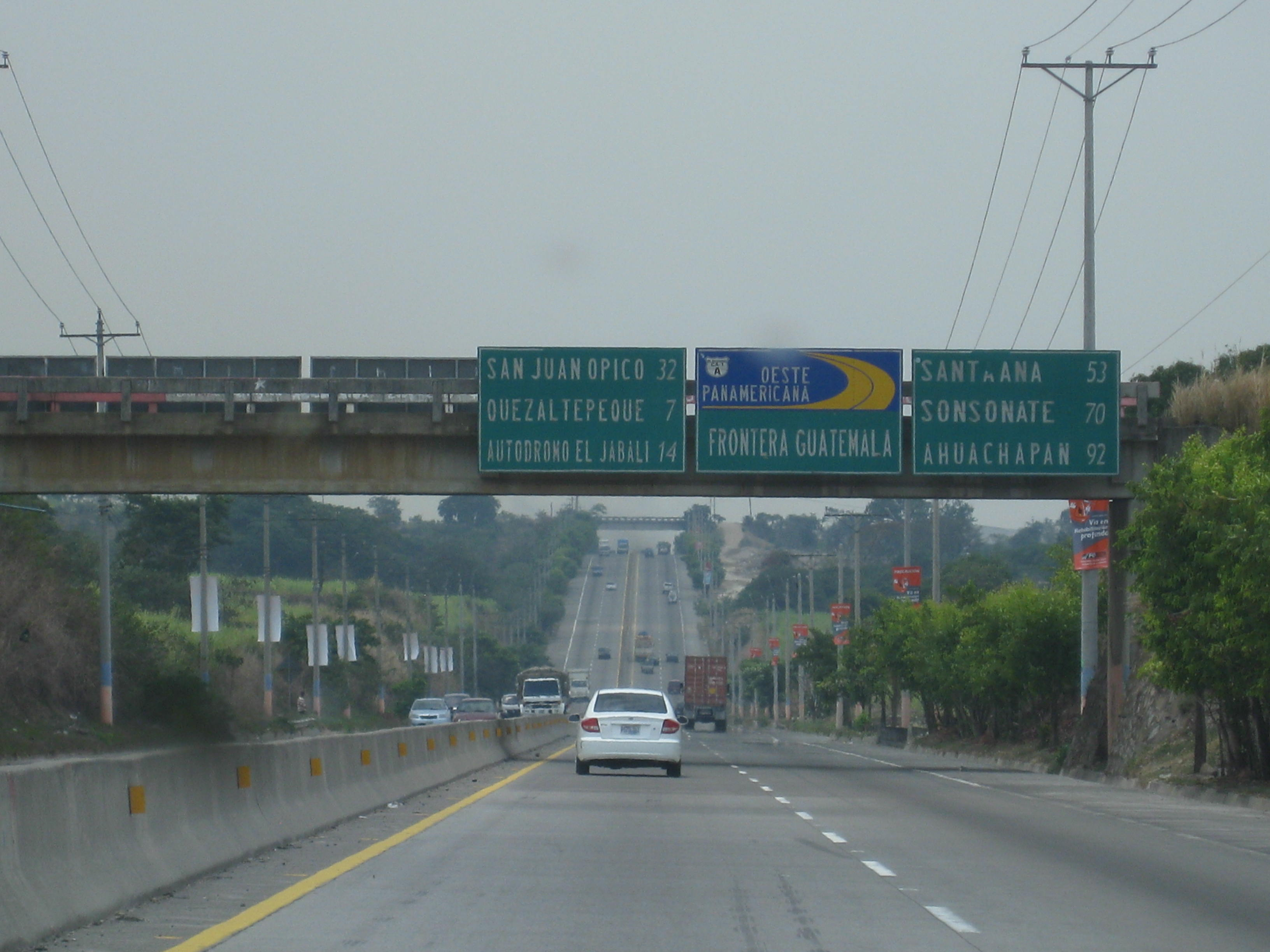
Carretera Panamericana westbound at Nejapa. Note "CA-1 A", signage for alternative CA-1, north bypass of San Salvador.

El Salvador is the smallest country (by area) along the route of the Pan-American Highway. After crossing into El Salvador at Candelaria de la Frontera, the Inter-American Highway continues toward Santa Ana as Central America Highway 1. From the border crossing to Santa Ana is about 13 km (8.1 mi).

From Santa Ana, this is a divided highway all along its 45 km (28 mi) to San Salvador, El Salvador's capital and largest city. At Nueva San Salvador, the highway passes near the Volcano de San Salvador.

From San Salvador to Cojutepeque is about 15 km (9.3 mi); following the highway southeast to San Miguel is about 65 km (40 mi); the divided highway ends at San Vicente. From San Miguel to the El Salvador–Honduras border is about 30 km (19 mi).

In El Salvador, the highway also passes through the cities of Santa Tecla, Antiguo Cuscatlán, and San Martín.

==== Honduras ====
The highway crosses the border into Honduras at El Amatillo near Nacaome (40 km (25 mi) from border). Just past Nacaome is a highway traveling north to Tegucigalpa, the capital of Honduras. Traveling south, it is 40 km (25 mi) to Choluteca, the fourth-largest city in Honduras. From Choluteca to the border crossing, just past San Marcos de Colón, is about 68 km (42 mi). The Pan-American Highway's total distance in Honduras is about 148 km (92 mi).

==== Nicaragua ====
From Honduras, it passes into Nicaragua at El Espino, passing through the Nicaraguan cities of Somoto, Estelí, Sebaco, Managua, Jinotepe, and Rivas before entering Costa Rica at Peñas Blancas.

From the crossing at the Honduras–Nicaragua border, the highway continues as Central America Highway 1 to the town of Ocotal, about 42 km (26 mi). From Ocotal to Estelí is about 58 km (36 mi), and on to the village of Sébaco is about 46 km (29 mi). At this point, the Inter-American Highway turns from southeast to south towards Ciudad Darío, which is 15 km (9.3 mi) from Sébaco. From Ciudad Dario to the village of San Benito is 55 km (34 mi).

From San Benito, it is about 38 km (24 mi) to Nicaragua's capital and largest city, Managua, on the shores of Lake Managua. From Managua south to the town of Jinotepe is about 50 km (31 mi), and Jinotepe to the town of Rivas is about 70 km (43 mi). Around this area the Highway is in view of Lake Nicaragua, which is the largest lake in Central America. From Rivas to the Nicaragua–Costa Rica border is about 35 km (22 mi).

==== Costa Rica ====
In Costa Rica, the Pan-American Highway is known as Carretera Interamericana (Inter-American Highway) and is composed of two segments Carretera Interamericana Norte (Route 1) and Carretera Interamericana Sur (Route 2).

It passes through Liberia, San José, Cartago, Pérez Zeledón, Palmares, Neily, before crossing into Panama at Paso Canoas.

The highest point in the entire Pan-American Highway occurs at the Cerro de la Muerte (Death Hill) in the Carretera Interamericana Sur segment, at 3,335 m (10,942 ft).

An alternative route used by cross country buses and freight transportation that avoids crossing through the Greater Metropolitan Area and Cerro de la Muerte, is by taking Route 23 in Puntarenas canton from Route 1, then Route 27 and Route 34, and taking Route 2 in Osa canton.

After entering Costa Rica, the Highway separates two national parks, the Santa Rosa National Park to the west and Guanacaste National Park to the east. From the Nicaragua–Costa Rica border to the town of Liberia is about 76.8 km (47.7 mi). In the region of Costa Rica, the Pan-American Highway runs just west of the Cordillera de Guanacaste (Guanacaste Mountains), which includes the active volcanoes of Rincón de la Vieja and Miravalles. While travelling through Costa Rica, north of San Jose, the highway route is known as Costa Rica Highway 1 instead of CA Highway 1. From San Jose south to Panama, the highway route is known as Costa Rica Highway 2.

Liberia to the town of Barranca is 120 km (75 mi) from Barranca; the Cordillera de Tilarán (Tilarán Mountains) can be seen from the Inter-American Highway. The Tilarán range includes Arenal, one of the world's most active volcanoes. From Barranca, the highway heads east across the mountains and the Continental Divide once again. From Barranca, it is roughly 77 km (48 mi) to the town of Alajuela.

After Alajuela the Cordillera Central (Central Mountains) come into view from the Inter-American Highway. The Central Mountains include four large volcanoes--Poás, Barva, Irazú and Turrialba. From Alajuela to San José is about fifteen km (9.3 mi).

San José is the capital and largest city in Costa Rica. Leaving San José, the Inter-American Highway winds its way roughly southeast. From San José to San Isidro de El General is about 136 km (85 mi).

From San Isidro, the Cordillera de Talamanca (Talamanca Mountains) rise up from the rain forest canopy. The Talamanca range, which is non-volcanic, includes Cerro Chirripó, Costa Rica's highest mountain peak at 3,820 m (12,530 ft). From San Isidro to Palmar Sur is roughly 122 km (80 mi), and Palmar Sur to the Costa Rica–Panama border is 91.9 km (57.1 mi).

==== Panama ====
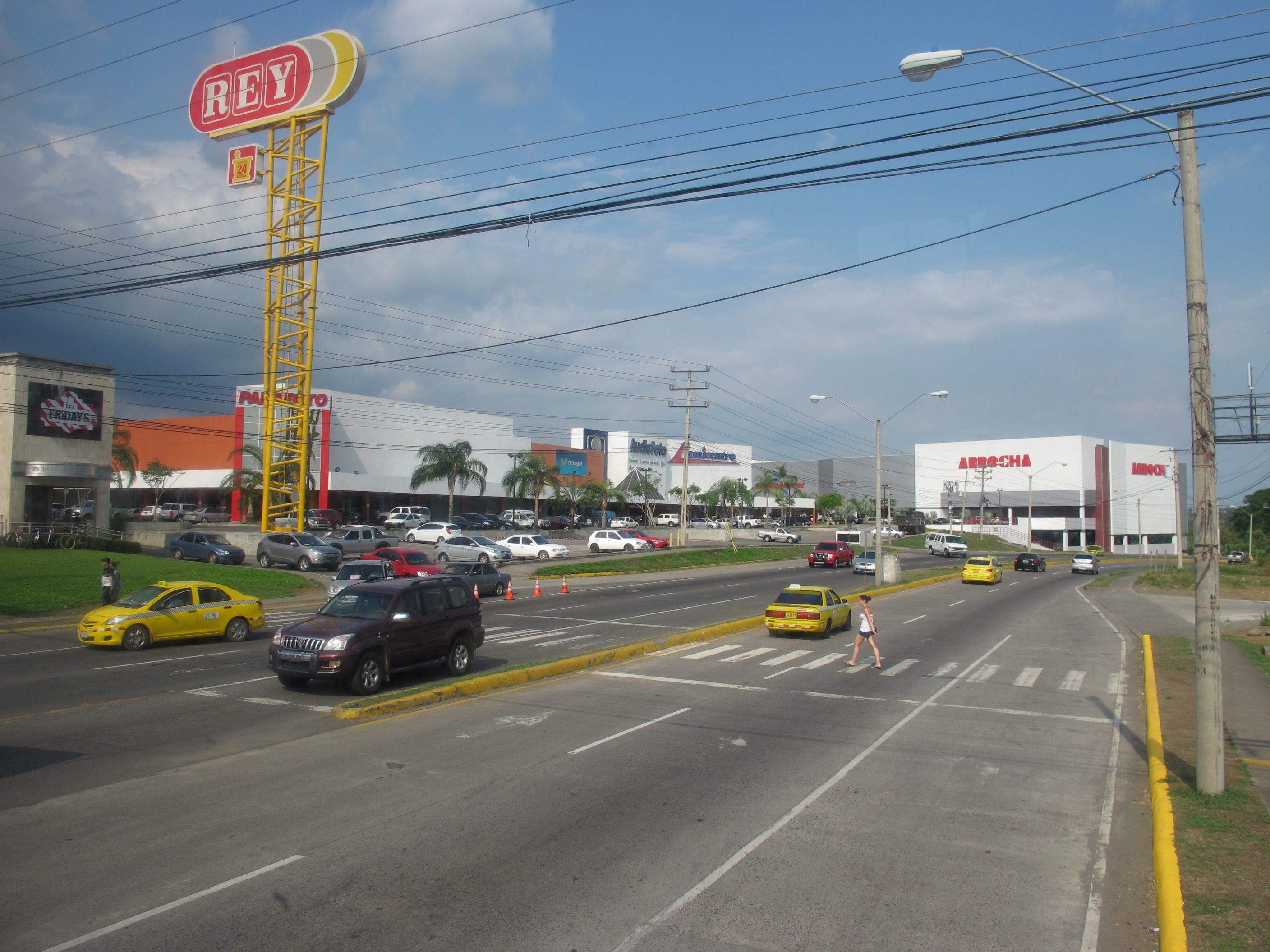
Pan-American Highway at David, Chiriquí

From the Costa Rica–Panama border to La Concepción, the highway length is approximately 20 km (10 mi), from La Concepción to David the distance is 25 km (16 mi). The highway enters Panama traveling generally from west to east.

David, the capital of the Chiriqui Province, is located about 8 km (5 mi) north of the town of Pedregal and the Gulf of Chiriquí. From David, the highway travels east about 90 km (56 mi) to Tolé. From Tolé to the town of Santiago the distance is approximately 80 km (50 mi). About halfway to Santiago, the Pan-American Highway crosses over the San Pablo river.

From Santiago to Aguadulce, the Pan American Highway travels 61 km (38 mi), where it reenters the tropical lowlands. From Aguadulce to Penonomé, it stretches about 48 km (30 mi). This section of highway crosses the Santa María river.

From Penonomé, the highway travels southeast, then northeast, then roughly north in a loop as it avoids crossing into Panama's Central Mountains. From Penonomé to La Chorerra the distance is 100 km (62 mi), while from La Chorerra, the distance is 25 km (16 mi) to Balboa just west of Panama City.

Panama City is the capital and largest city in Panama. Before entering the city, the Pan-American Highway crosses over the Panama Canal on the Centennial Bridge, From Panama City, the Highway turns northeast. From Panama City to Chepo, the highest is roughly 55 km (34 mi), from Chepo to Cañita is another 25 km (16 mi).

At the village of Cañita is the old terminus of the northern route of the Pan-American Highway. The highway continues another 201 km (125 mi) past Cañita to the village of Yaviza, a village near the junction of the Tuira and Chucunaque rivers. It is here that the northern section of the Pan-American Highway ends. Southeast of here is the virtually impenetrable Darién Gap, a 100 km (62 mi) stretch of rugged, mountainous jungle terrain. The highway is being extended 6 km to Pinogana, which will include a bridge over the Chucunaque River at Yaviza.

United States government funding was particularly significant to complete the high-level Bridge of the Americas over the Panama Canal, during the years when the canal was administered by the United States.

== Darién Gap ==
Map of the Darién Gap and the break in the Pan-American Highway between Yaviza, Panama and Turbo, Colombia

The Pan-American Highway is interrupted between Panama and Colombia by a 106-kilometre (66 mi) stretch of marshland known as the Darién Gap. The highway terminates at Turbo, Colombia, and Yaviza, Panama. Because of swamps, marshes, and rivers, construction would be very expensive. Although technically possible, crossing on foot is both extremely difficult and dangerous.

Efforts have been made for decades to eliminate the gap in the Pan-American Highway, but have been controversial. Planning began in 1971 with the help of United States funding, but this was halted in 1974 after concerns raised by environmentalists. Another effort to build the road began in 1992, but by 1994 a United Nations agency reported that the road, and the subsequent development, would cause extensive environmental damage. The Embera-Wounaan and Guna have also expressed concern that the road could bring about the potential erosion of their cultures.

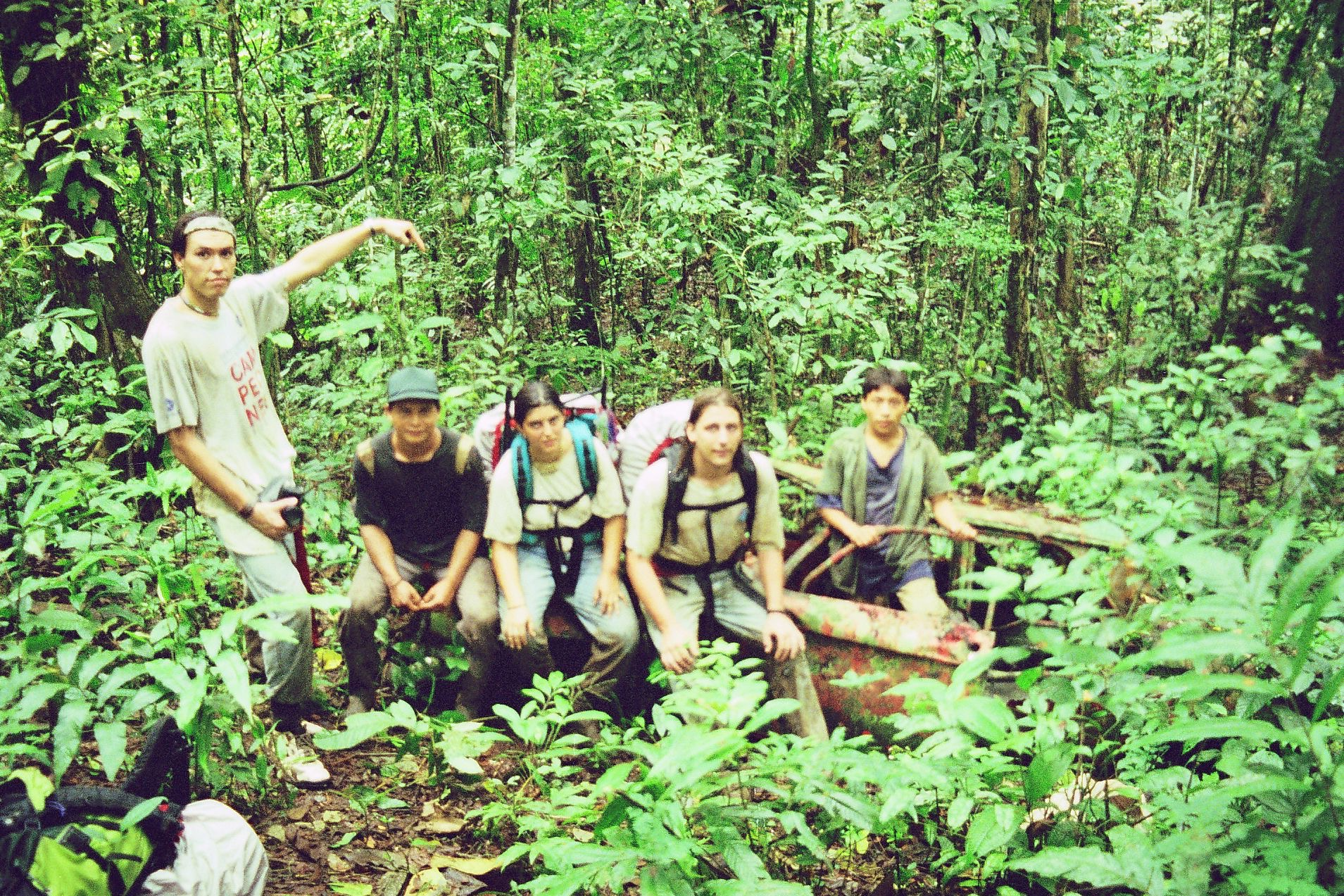
The first Mexican by-foot crossers take a rest by the "Lost Corvair", abandoned in 1961 by a caravan from Chicago.

The Darién Gap has challenged adventurers for many years. A 1961 expedition with three Chevrolet Corvair rear-engine cars and two support trucks completed the trip south from Chicago through to the Colombian border. A 1971–72 British expedition from Alaska to Argentina attempted to transit the Gap with two standard-production Range Rovers, supported by a team of Land Rovers. They barely succeeded in thrashing a passage through the extreme terrain. In 1979, a team led by Mark Smith drove standard production CJ7-model Jeeps from South to North, traversing the Gap with difficulty. In 1984, Loren and Patty Upton made the first "all land" vehicle crossing of the Gap using a 1966 Jeep CJ-5 named Sand Ship Discovery. It took months of slogging, winching, chopping, and digging their way through the inhospitable jungles of the Darién Gap.

One proposed option to bridge the gap is a short ferry link from Colombia to a new ferry port in Panama, with an extension of the existing Panama highway that would complete the highway without violating these environmental concerns. However, past attempts to operate such a service have ended in failure.

== Southern section ==
A Vía PanAm shield sign is sometimes found on routes in South American countries (such as Chile) associated with the Pan-American Highway.

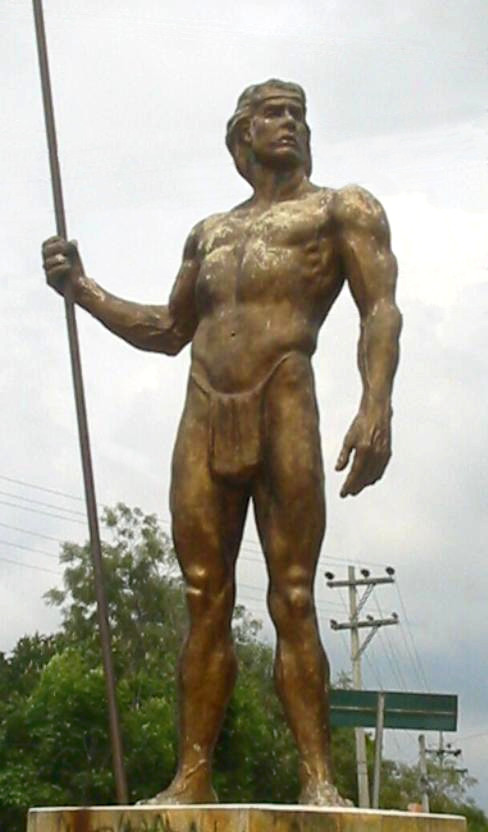
Sculpture of a native man standing at the entrance of Fusagasugá, Colombia, over the Highway 40.

=== Colombia and Venezuela ===
The southern part of the highway begins in Turbo, Colombia, from where it follows Colombia Highway 62 to Medellín. On Google Maps, the beginning of the highway is at a marker at the end of a road built out to a place along the proposed extended highway in the flatlands 11 miles from the Atrato River and 20 miles from the main highway called "El Cuarenta" or "Lomas Aisladas" ("Isolated hills"), which has a marker "Inicio del tramo sur de la carretera Panamericana" ("Start of the southern section of the Pan-American Highway"). At Medellín, Colombia Highway 56 leads to Bogotá, but Colombia Highway 25 turns south for a more direct route. Colombia Highway 40 is routed southwest from Bogotá to join Highway 25 at Zarzal. Highway 25 continues all the way to the border with Ecuador.

Travelers along the Inter-American Highway portion of the Pan-American Highway in Panama can take a ferry from Panama City to the port of Buenaventura, which is 115 km northwest of Cali. Cali represents a major junction between Buenaventura and two northern spurs of the Pan-American Highway that connect from northern Colombia and Venezuela.

The main route of the Pan-American Highway in Colombia (starting from the northeast) begins just east of Cúcuta, the capital city of the department of Norte de Santander. The highway follows Colombia Route 55 for 63 km from Cúcuta to Pamplona, where it shifts to Colombia Route 66 for 45 km to reach the border with the department of Santander.

From the department border, Route 66 continues southwest for 50 km toward Bucaramanga, state capital of Santander located on a plateau in the Cordillera Oriental. From Bucaramanga, the Pan-American Highway switches from Route 66 to Colombia Route 45A, which it follows south by southwest to the town of Barbosa. This 203-km stretch on Route 45A is a toll road. Approximately 26 km of this stretch of highway enters the department of Boyacá and reenters Santander between Vado Real and Guepsa. From Barbosa, the Pan-American Highways switches from Route 45A to Colombia Route 62 and immediately reenters Boyacá towards Tunja, the state capital of Boyacá.

A 53-km stretch of highway connects Barbosa with Tunja, an important agriculture and mining center in the region. The Pan-American Highway switches routes again in Tunja, returning to Colombia Route 55 on its way to Cundinamarca and the national capital, Bogotá. The stretch of highway from Tunja to the departmental border with Cundinamarca is 54 km and is a toll road. From the Cundinamarca departmental line, the highway continues another 26 km without tolls before becoming a toll road again. From that point, the highway reaches Bogotá in 52 km.

In Bogotá, the highway crosses from the north to the southwest portion of the city, switching from Route 55 to Colombia Route 40. Continuing as a toll road from Bogotá, it travels for 128 km through Fusagasugá to the departmental border with Tolima.

From the Tolima departmental border, the highway continues as a toll road for another 16 km to El Espinal. It travels west and after another 37 km, reaches the city of Ibagué. From Ibagué to the Quindío departmental border near La Linea is about 77 km.

Upon crossing into Quindío, Colombia Route 40 continues westward for another four km before reaching Calarcá, where Route 40 splits into two spurs. One enters Armenia. The spurs rejoin about 18 km southwest of Calarcá at the town of Club Campestre. From Club Campestre, it covers another 16 km until reaching the Valle del Cauca departmental border.

From the border, the Pan-American Highway travels 26 km to the town of La Paila, where it crosses Colombia Route 25. At this junction, the two routes merge and become a toll road for 61 km from that point to Buga. At Buga, Route 40 splits west toward the city of Buenaventura and the Pacific Ocean; the Pan-American Highway continues south on Route 25 for another 42 km until arriving near Palmira. From Palmira, the highway continues southwest for 23 km, where it reaches the large city of Cali. From Cali to the Cauca departmental border is 19 km.

The highway continues south along Route 25 throughout its length in the department of Cauca. After 50 km, the highway becomes a toll road at Santander de Quilichao until reaching Santander de Quilichao and Popayán after 74 km. It continues generally southwest from Popayán; reaching Mojarras after 135 km. At Mojarras, Route 25 splits into two spurs; the western spur is preferred for traveling south toward the Nariño departmental border. From Mojarras to the departmental border near Remolino is 36 km.

From the Nariño departmental border, the highway continues south as Route 25. From the border to the city of Pasto is 84 km. From Pasto to the national border between Colombia and Ecuador near Ipiales is 82 km. The Pan-American crosses the border at the Rumichaca Bridge.

==== Simón Bolívar Highway ====
Another route, known as the Simón Bolívar Highway, runs from Bogotá (Colombia) to La Guaira (Venezuela). It begins by using Colombia Highways 55 & 66 all the way to the border with Venezuela. From there it uses Venezuela Highway 1 to Caracas and Venezuela Highway 9 to its end at La Guaira.

The road ends at Venezuela Highway 9 in Güiria, a small town in the state of Sucre just west of Trinidad along the Gulf of Paria coastline. From Güiria, the highway winds west 76 km (47 mi) towards the town of Yaguaraparo.

Once the highway reaches Yaguaraparo, on the southern portion of the Paria Peninsula along the Gulf of Paria, Highway 9 continues west for approximately 83 km (52 mi) to the towns of Casanay and Pantoño.

Upon reaching Casanay, the highway crosses Venezuela Highway 10, a major north–south highway. From Casanay and neighboring Pantoño, it continues west, paralleling the Gulf of Cariaco. The highway crosses Secondary Highway 2 at Villa Frontado, which travels south into the state of Monagas. The distance from Casanay to Cumaná is about 90 km (56 mi). From Cumaná, the road travels southwest approximately 65 km to the border with the state of Anzoátegui.

After crossing into Anzoátegui, it almost immediately enters the city of Barcelona. Travelling from Barcelona and nearby Puerto La Cruz, the highway continues westward. For about 47 km, it becomes a limited-access expressway, returning to a two-lane highway at Puerto Píritu. The highway travels another 62 km reaches the border with the state of Miranda at the town of Boca de Uchire. This portion includes a short run through the llanos, or Venezuelan savannas.

About 34 km west of Boca de Uchire, the highway starts climbing up the Cordillera Central, in the Andes Mountains. Highway 9 begins here to move further away from the Caribbean Sea coastline. From Boca de Uchire to El Guapo, the distance is 65 km; from El Guapo to Caucagua adds 59 km.

At Caucagua, the Pan-American Highway crosses Venezuela Highway 12. Highway 9 continues through the Cordillera Central. After about 21 km, the highway becomes a limited-access expressway for 32 km west towards the Caracas metropolitan area and the Venezuelan Federal District.

Maracay is the capital city of Aragua state in central Venezuela. It was officially established on March 5, 1701, by Bishop Diego de Baños y Sotomayor in the valleys of Tocopio and Tapatapa (what is known today as the central valley of Aragua) in northern Venezuela. From Maracay, the highway extends about 44 km to Valencia, passing San Joaquin and near Cuacara en route to the city.

Valencia is the capital city of Carabobo state. In Valencia, the highway shifts northwest and passes through mountains that are part of the Sistema Coriano. The distance between Valencia and the small town of El Palito on the Caribbean Sea is approximately 40 km. At El Palito, the road joins with Venezuela Highway 3 for 10 km, then splits off at Morón. The distance from Morón to the state border with Yaracuy state and the village of Guaremal is about 20 km.

From Guaremal to San Felipe, the major city in Yaracuy, is about 26 km. The city itself is located on a route adjacent to Highway 1. The road runs 73 km from San Felipe to the state border with Lara (located just past the town of Cambural). The distance from the border to Barquisimeto is about 16 km.

From Barquisimeto, Highway 1 continues roughly west, then southwest (at around Agua Salada) for 147 km to the state line with Trujillo, near El Empedrado.

Once in the state of Trujillo (near the town of Parajá), the Pan-American Highway continues in a southwest direction; it does not travel through the state capital city of Trujillo but connects to Trujillo by way of state highways 3 and 1. The highway's length in this state is about 111 km.

The highway enters Mérida state near Arapuey. As in Trujillo, the highway does not travel through the major population centers, of which the largest is Mérida. Highway 1 connects to Mérida via an 88-km stretch of Mérida state highway 4. The highway covers 104 km in Mérida.

Upon entering the state of Táchira, the high extends about 58 km from the border to the junction with Venezuela Highway 6. From the junction to the city of San Cristóbal the distance is 44 km, although there is a separate expressway that parallels the Pan-American Highway along this stretch. From San Cristóbal to the Venezuela-Colombia border, near San Antonio de Táchira, the distance is 32 km.

=== Peru, Ecuador, and Chile ===
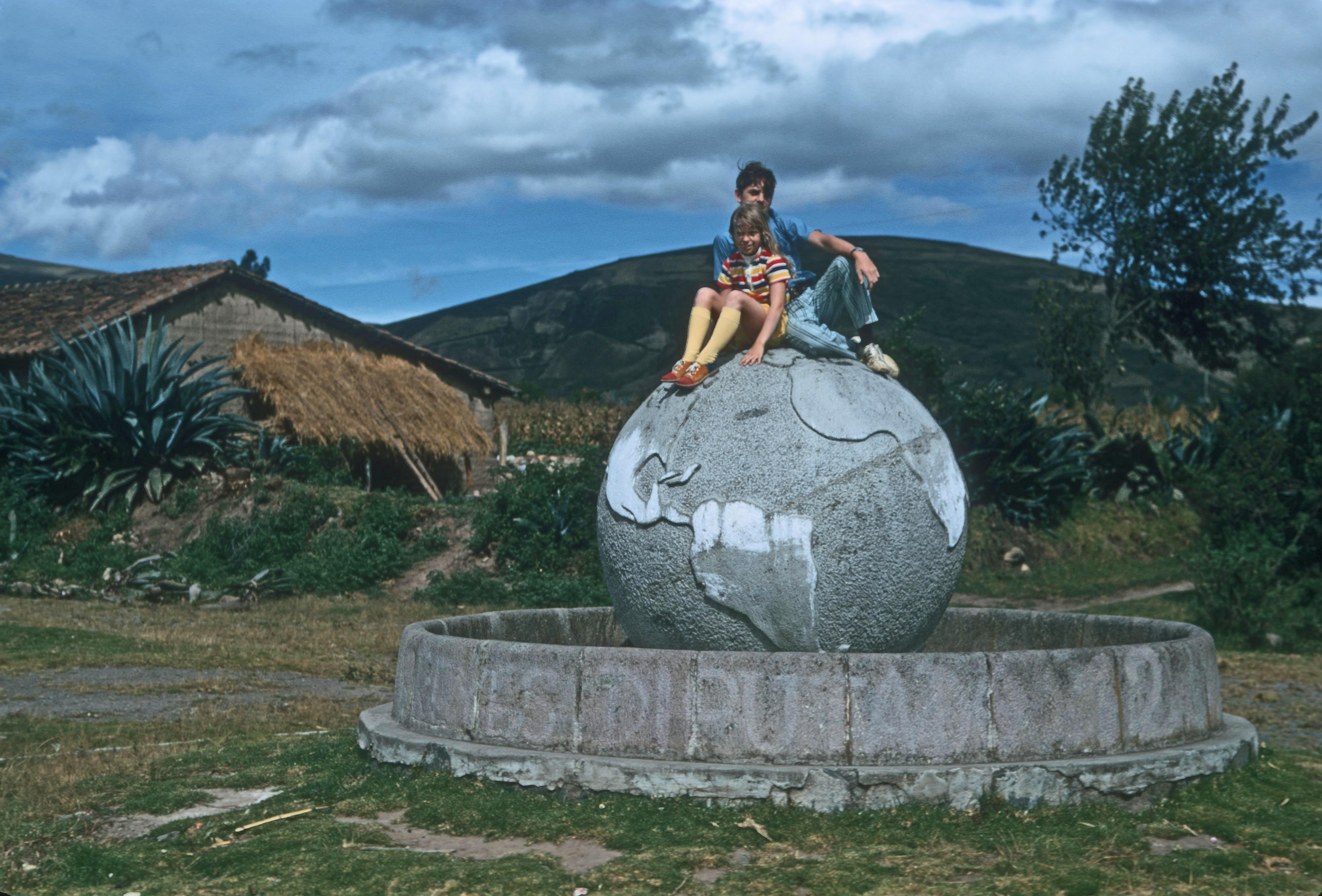
Monument on the Equator on the highway near Cayambe, Ecuador.

Ecuador Highway 35 runs the whole length of the country. Ecuador Highway 35, the "Troncal de la Sierra" (Highland's Road), is commonly known to Ecuadorians as "La Panamericana" and forms Ecuador's contribution to the project. It connects cities and towns from the Sierra region, from Tulcán at the north (border with Colombia), passing through Quito, the country's capital, to the southern border with Peru. Part of this highway is a toll-road administered by Panavial, a private concessionary. The road condition is quite good, but it mostly goes through mountains and it has some bad trails around the province of Cañar (center of the country), making it a fairly dangerous road to drive on.

The Ecuadorian portion begins at the Colombian border in Carchi province and almost immediately enters the city of Tulcán, the capital of Carchi province. From Tulcán, the road continues south for 125 km, reaching Ibarra. From Ibarra, the highway continues south for 115 km until reaching Quito. From Quito, the highway continues south for 89 km next reaching Latacunga.

From Latacunga, the Pan-American Highway continues south for 47 km to Ambato. From Ambato, the road continues south for 52 km to Riobamba. Azogues is the capital of Cañar Province. From Azogues the road becomes six lanes wide (three north, three south) built in 1995, until it reaches Cuenca.

From north of the city the Pan-American Highway takes the name of Avenida Circunvalación Sur (Avenue South Ring) until exiting to the south, where it shrinks to two lanes (one north, one south) enlarged in 2009 until reaching Loja.

Peru Highway 1 carries the Pan-American Highway all the way through Peru to the border with Chile. The northern terminus of the highway is located in Aguas Verdes (Tumbes Region) at the border with Ecuador. Starting in this point, the highway is known as Carretera Panamericana Norte ("North Pan-American Highway") until it reaches a point located in central Lima, the country's capital.

From this point south the highway is called Carretera Panamericana Sur ("South Pan-American Highway"), until it reaches the southern border, located in the Santa Rosa Border Post (36 km south of Tacna, the highway's closest major city), in the Tacna Region at the border with Chile.

From Lima to Cañete 148 km.

In Chile, the highway follows Chile Route 5 south to (Llaillay), a point north of Santiago, where the highway splits into two parts, one of which goes through Chilean territory to Puerto Montt, where it splits again, to Quellón on Chiloé Island, and to its continuation as the Carretera Austral. The other part goes east along Chile Route 60, which goes through the Andes to the Christ the Redeemer Tunnel, inside the Los Libertadores Pass. The Chilean-Argentinian border is located in the middle of the tunnel.

=== Bolivia ===
Bolivia’s access to the highway is primarily through Route 1 and Route 4. Bolivia is not on the main road of the highway. The Bolivian branch of the road passes through cities such as El Alto, Tarija, Potosí, La Paz, and Oruro.

=== Argentina and Paraguay ===
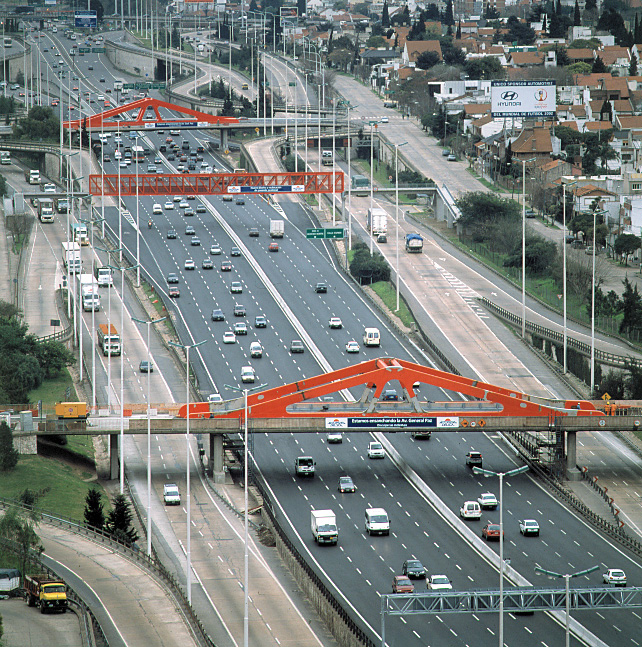
Almost all Pan-American sections in Gran Buenos Aires are modern highways

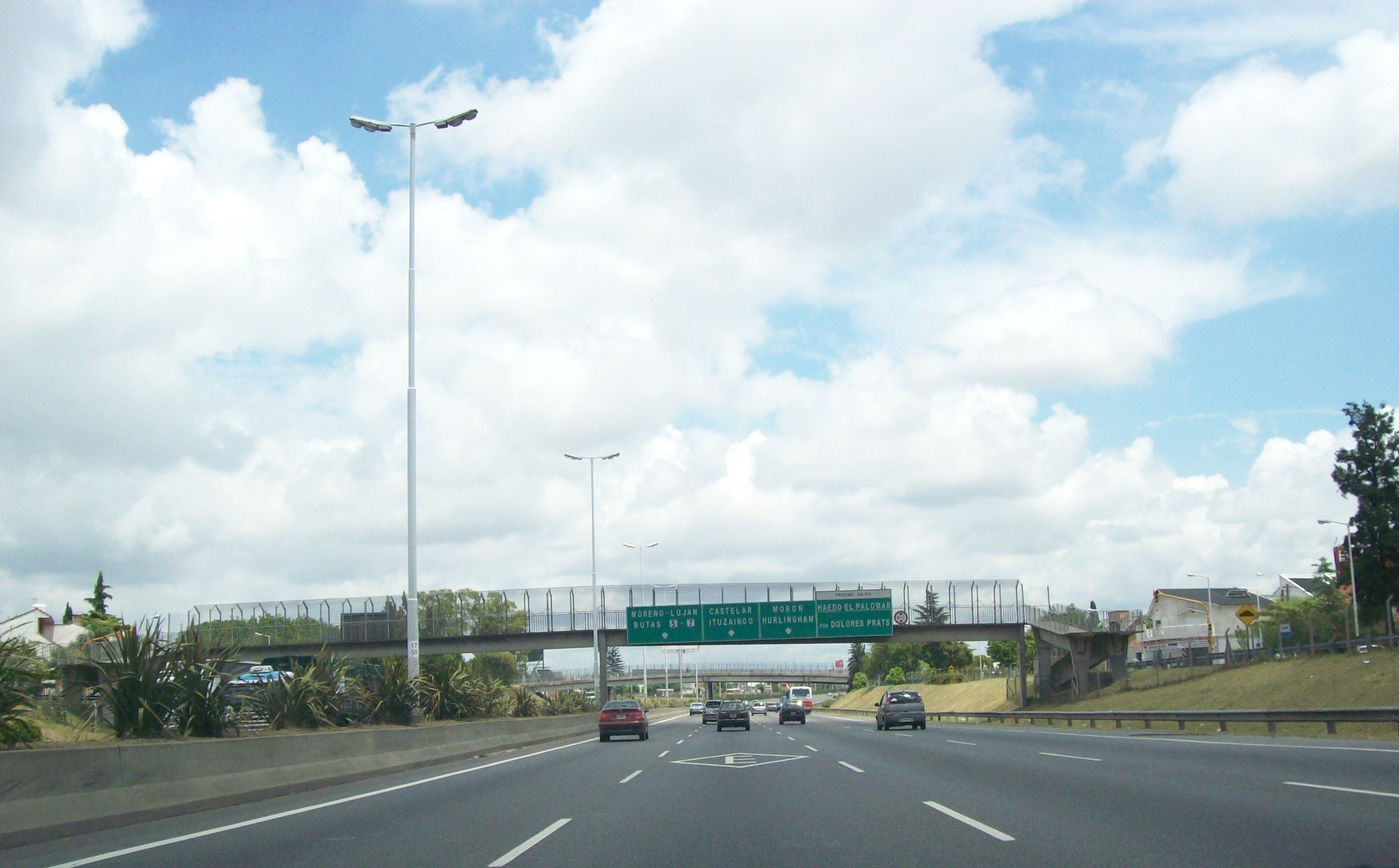
West Access to Buenos Aires

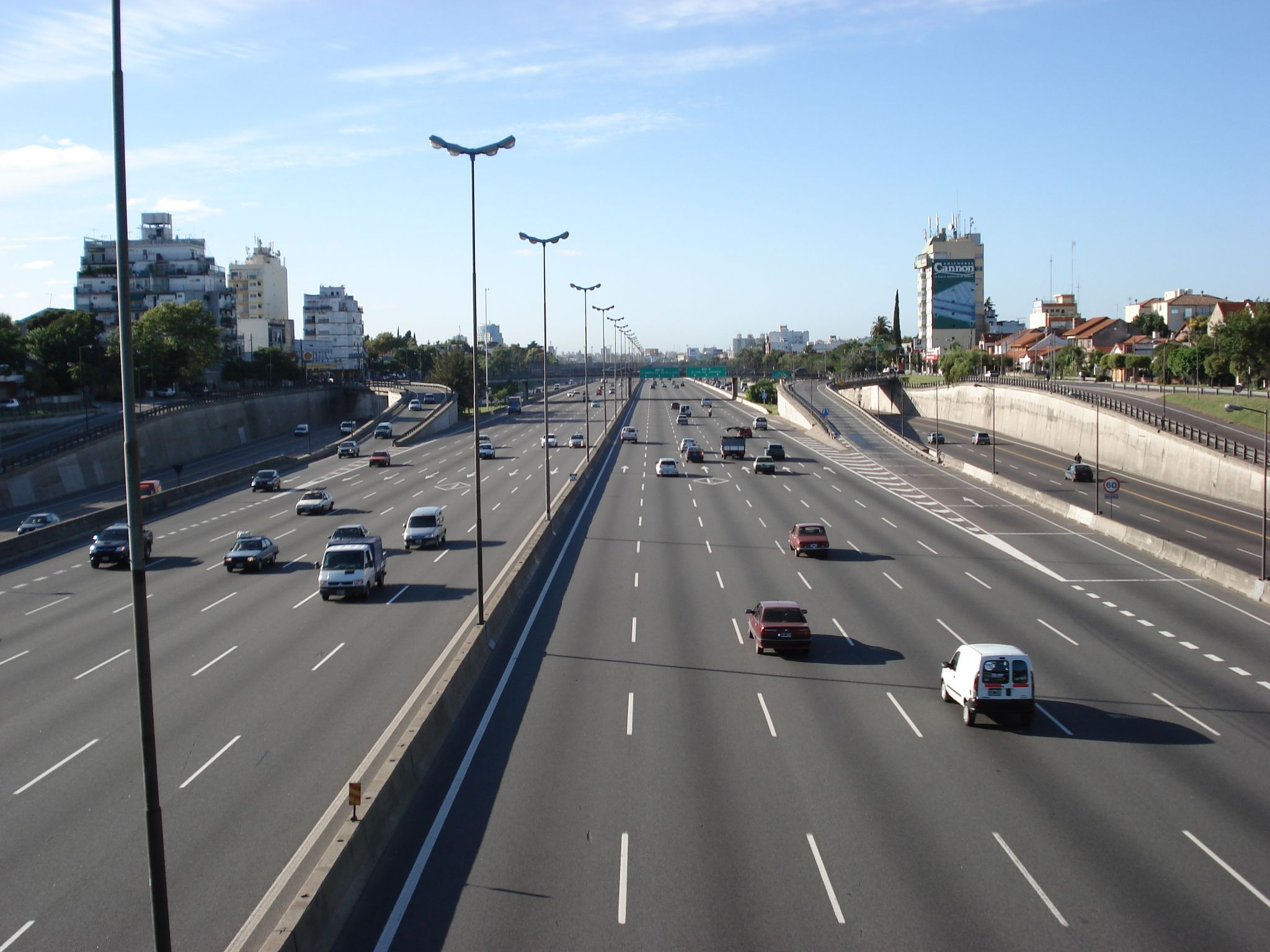
Stretch of the Pan-American Highway in Argentina

In Argentina, the Argentina National Route 7 starts in the Christ the Redeemer tunnel, and continues to Buenos Aires, the end of the main highway. The highway network also continues south of Buenos Aires along Argentina National Route 3 towards the city of Ushuaia in Tierra del Fuego. Another branch, from Buenos Aires to Asunción in Paraguay, heads out of Buenos Aires on Argentina National Route 9. It switches to Argentina National Route 11 at Rosario, which crosses the border with Paraguay right at Asunción. Other branches probably exist across the center of South America.

=== Brazil and Uruguay ===
A continuation of the Pan-American Highway to the Brazilian cities of São Paulo and Rio de Janeiro uses a ferry from Buenos Aires to Colonia in Uruguay and Uruguay Highway 1 to Montevideo. Uruguay Highway 9 and Brazil Highway 471 route to near Pelotas, from where Brazil Highway 116 leads to Brazilian main cities.

=== Guyana, Suriname, and French Guiana ===
The highway does not have official segments to Belize, Guyana, Suriname (there known in Dutch: Pan-Amerikaanse weg), and French Guiana, nor to any of the island nations in the Americas. However, highways from Venezuela link to Brazilian Trans-Amazonian highway that provides a southwest entrance to Guyana, route to the coast, and follow a coastal route through Suriname to French Guiana.

== West Indies section ==
Plans have been discussed for including the West Indies in the Pan American Highway system. According to these, a system of ferries would be established to connect terminal points of the highway. Travelers would then be able to ferry from Key West to Havana, drive to the eastern tip of Cuba, ferry to Haiti, drive through Haiti and the Dominican Republic, and ferry again to Puerto Rico. Included in this system would also be a ferry from the western tip of Cuba to the Yucatán Peninsula. Mexico has already surveyed a route which will run across the Yucatán, Campeche, and Chiapas to San Cristobal de Las Casas, on the Pan American Highway. ("The Pan American Highway System" by Travel Division Pan American Union, Washington D.C. October 1947)

== Art and culture ==
Travel writer Tim Cahill wrote a book, Road Fever, about his record-setting 24-day drive from Ushuaia in the Argentine province of Tierra del Fuego to Prudhoe Bay in the U.S. state of Alaska with professional long-distance driver Garry Sowerby, much of their route following the Pan-American Highway.

In the British motoring show Top Gear, the presenters drove on a section of the road in their off-road vehicles in the Bolivian Special.

== Sports ==
In 2003, Kevin Sanders, a long-distance rider, broke the Guinness World Record for the fastest traversal of the highway by motorcycle in 34 days.

In 2018, British cyclist Dean Stott, who had planned on riding the length of the Americas in 110 days to set a new Guinness World Record, completed the 14,000-mile (22,500 km) journey in just under 100 days, riding south-to-north, breaking the record, set by Mexico's Carlos Santamaría Covarrubias in 2015, by 17 days. Stott was inspired to push the timetable after learning that he and his wife had been invited to the wedding of Prince Harry and Meghan Markle, and would have missed the event had he stuck to his original schedule. Stott's record lasted just a couple of months, as Austrian endurance cyclist Michael Strasser, riding north-to-south, broke the record with a time of 84 days, 11 hours and 50 minutes (July 23 – October 16, 2018).

In 2024, American endurance cyclist Bond Almand IV broke Strasser's record, riding north-to-south in 75 days, 17 hours, and 55 minutes (August 31 – November 15, 2024).

Between 23 August and 19 December 2025, Canadian Ashleigh Myles, of Halifax, was the first woman to bike the entire Pan-American highway. It took her 118 days.

== Photo gallery ==
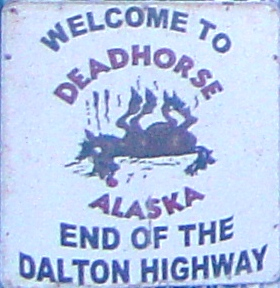
The northern end of the Pan-American Highway at Deadhorse, Alaska, USA

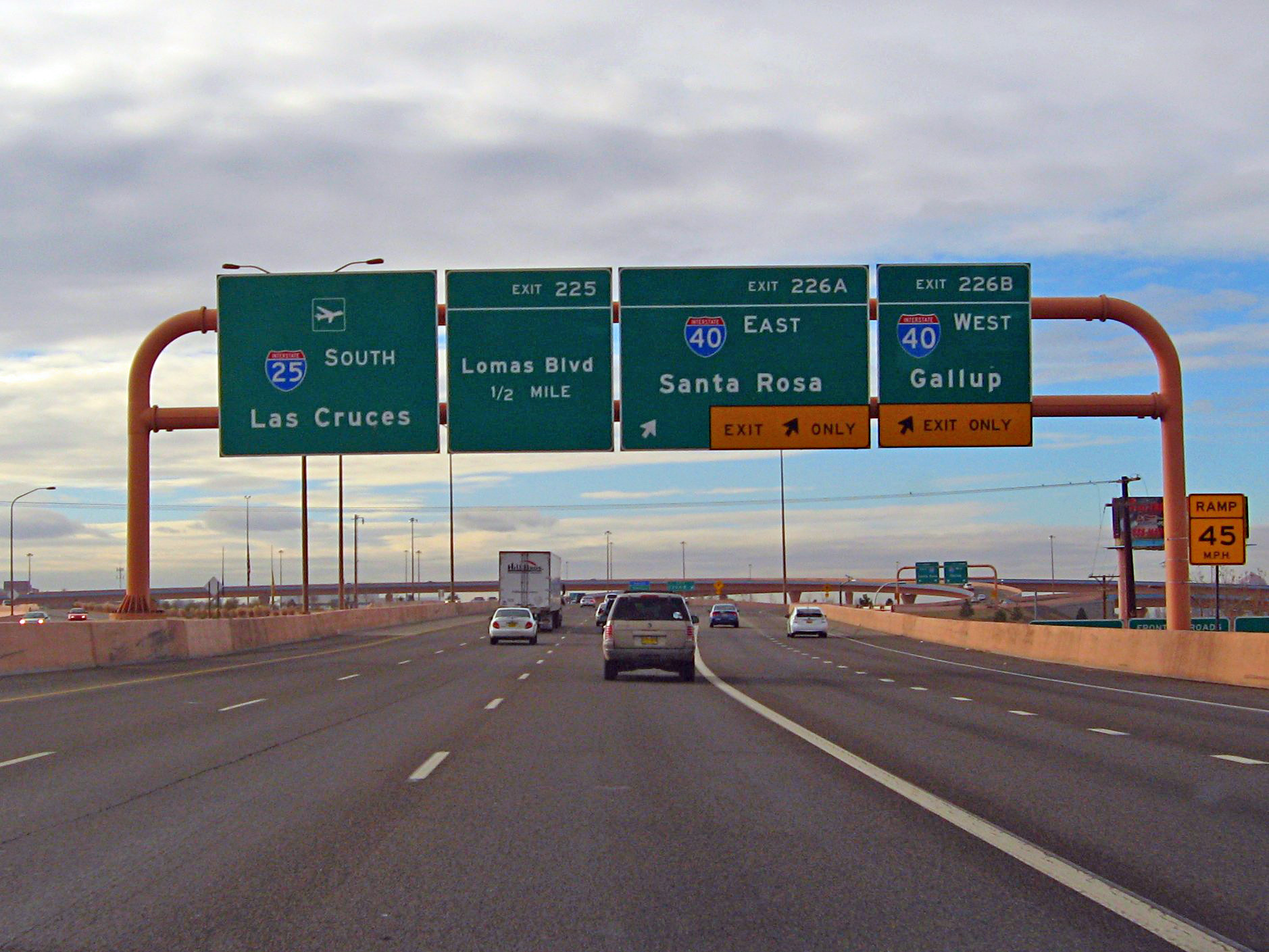
Interstate 25 (Pan-American Freeway) approaching the Big I interchange in Albuquerque, New Mexico, USA

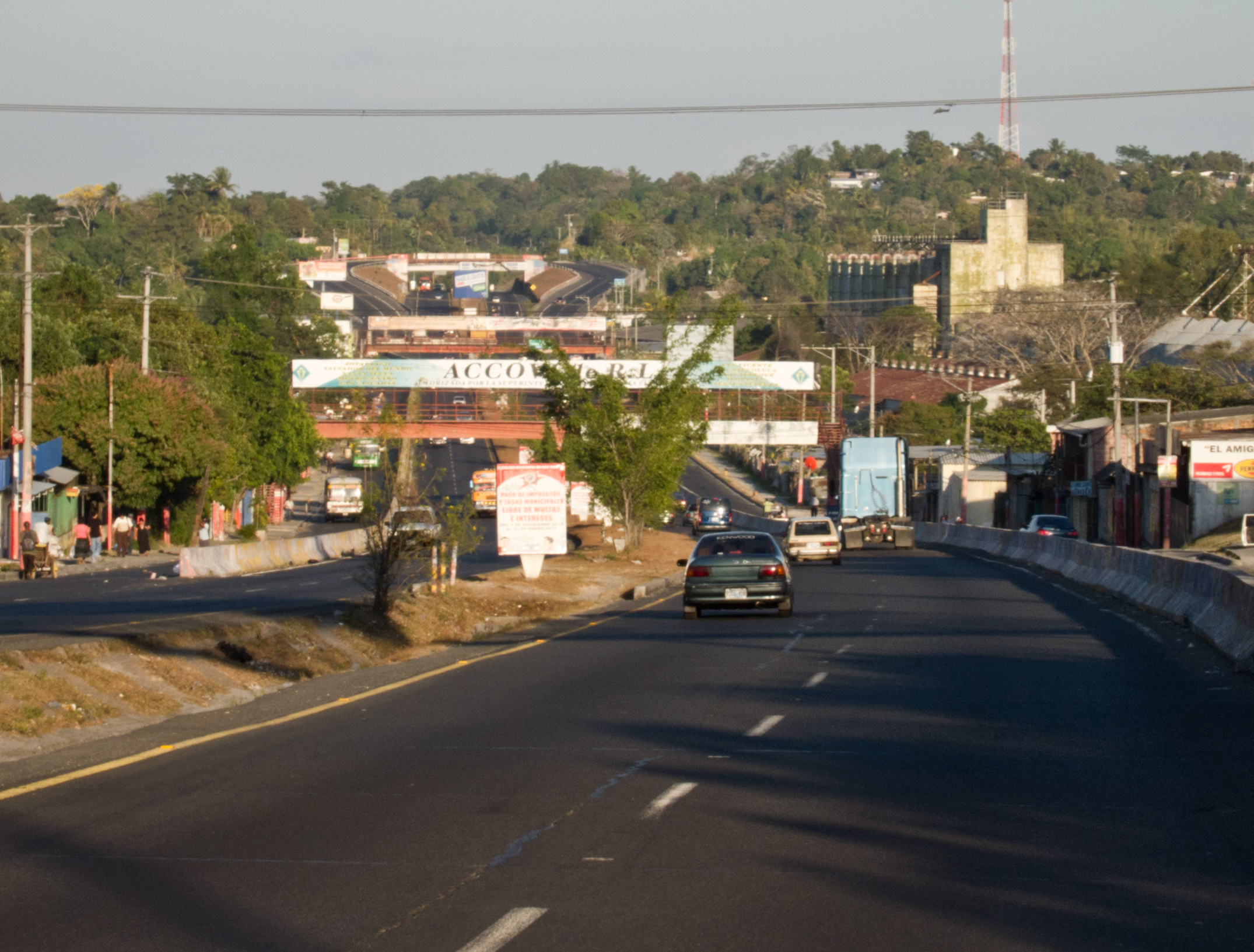
Pan-American Highway through San Martin, El Salvador.

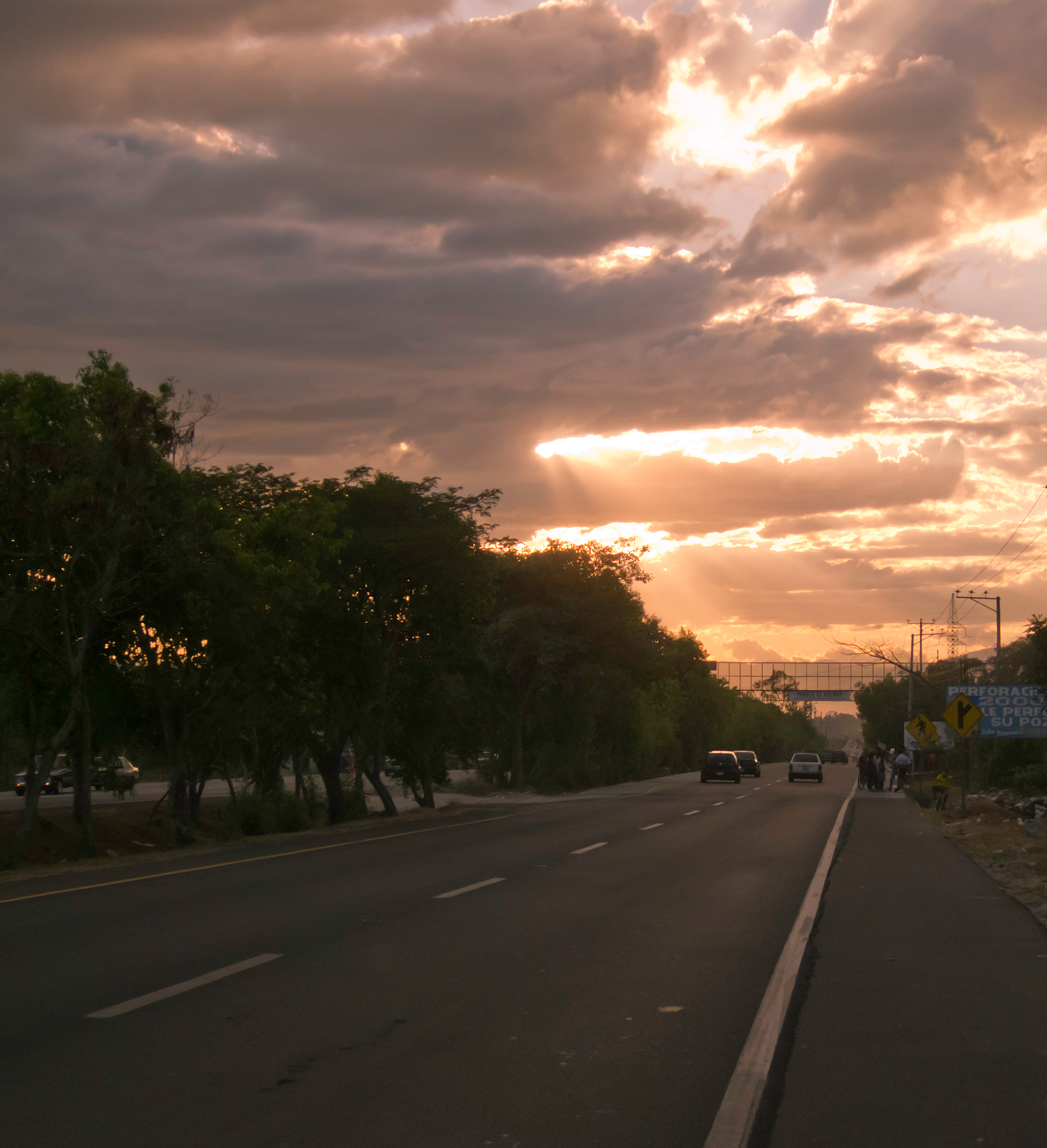
Another view of the Pan-American Highway in El Salvador.

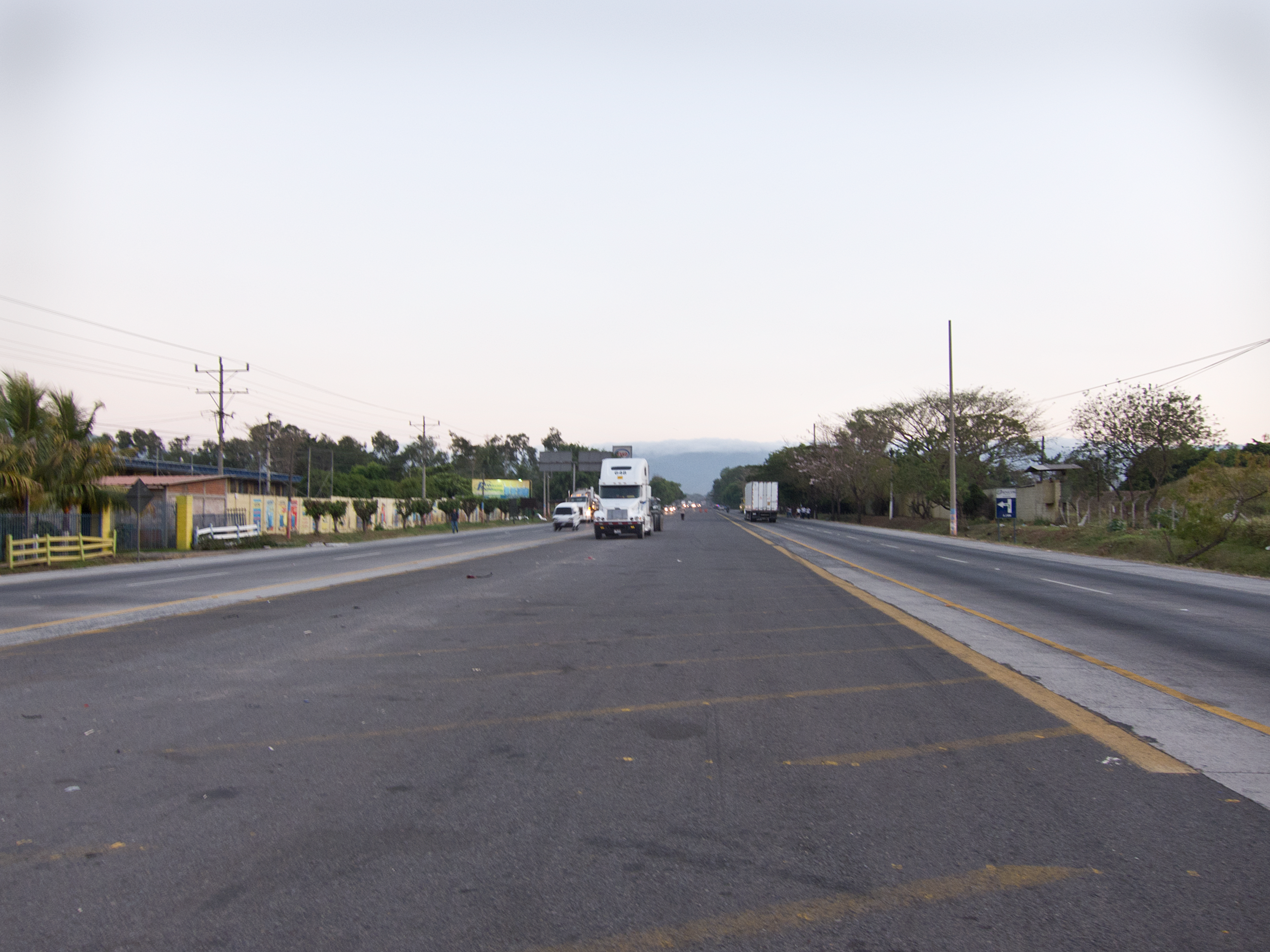
Pan-American Highway in El Salvador between Lourdes and Santa Ana; this flat 1.5 km (1 mi) long straight section can be used as an airstrip and it was used during El Salvador Civil War.

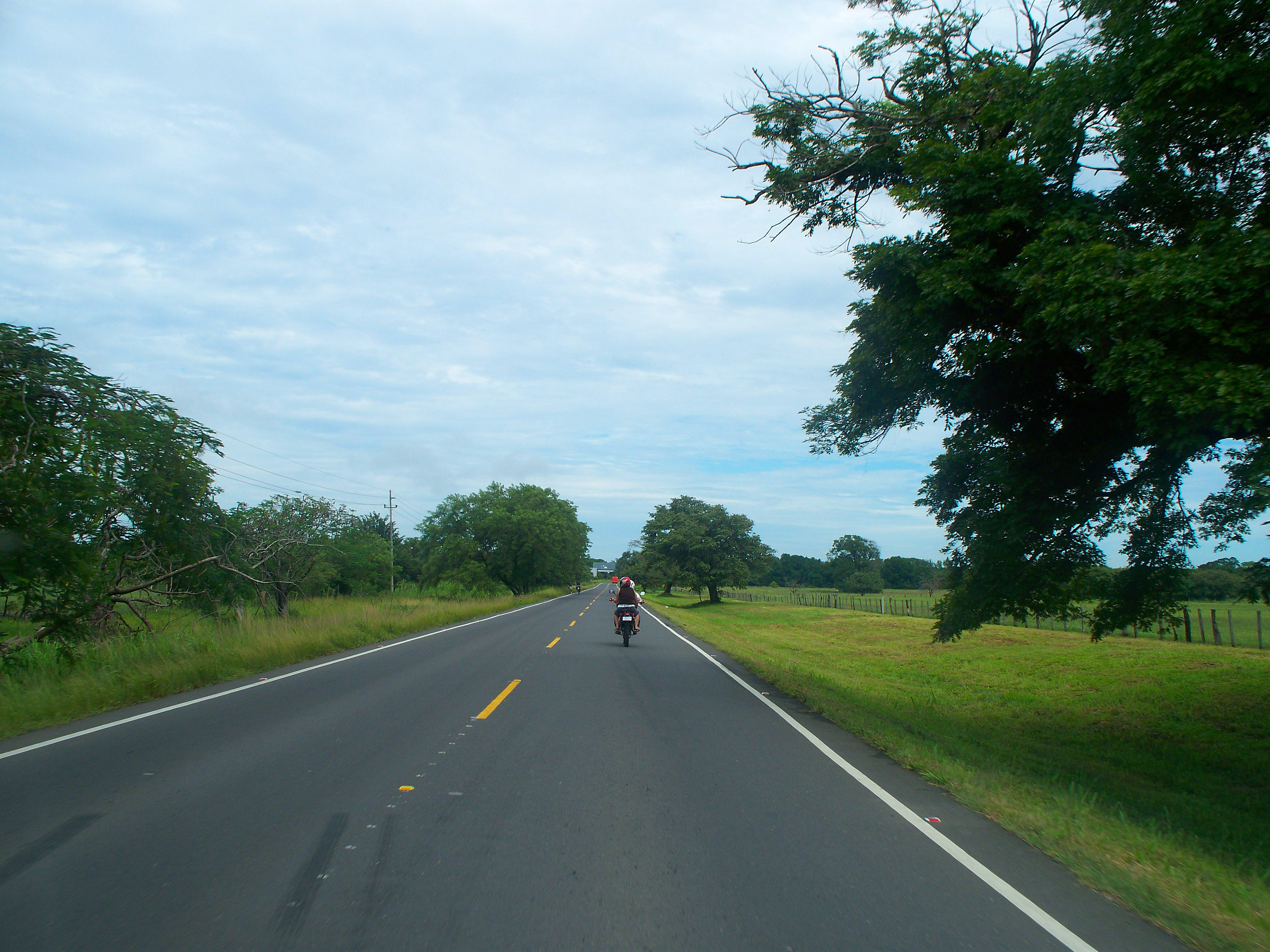
Pan-American Highway in Guanacaste, Costa Rica (heading to the Nicaraguan border)

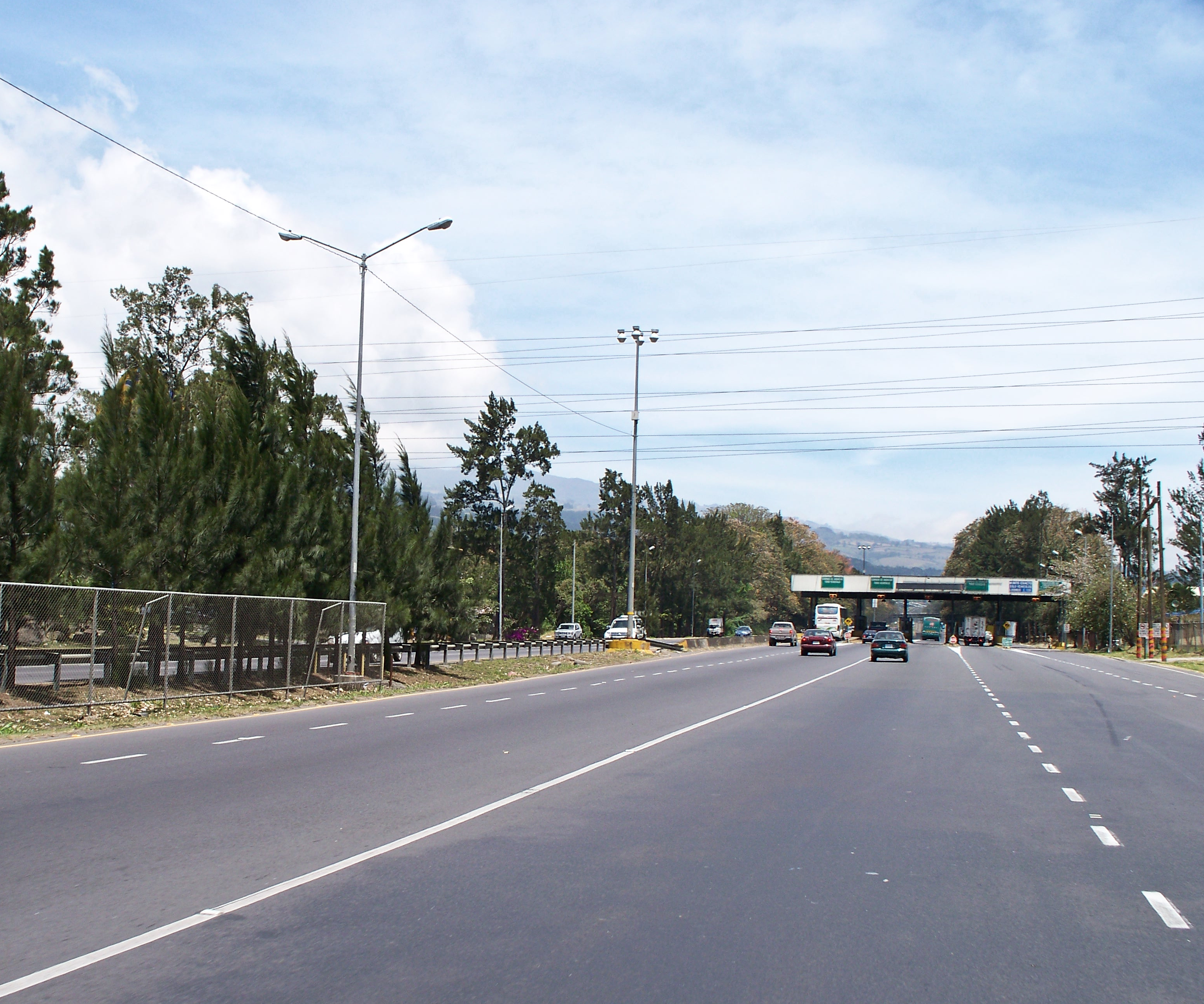
Pan-American Highway in Tres Rios, Costa Rica, right before the toll plaza (about 350 km or 220 mi to go until the Panamanian border).

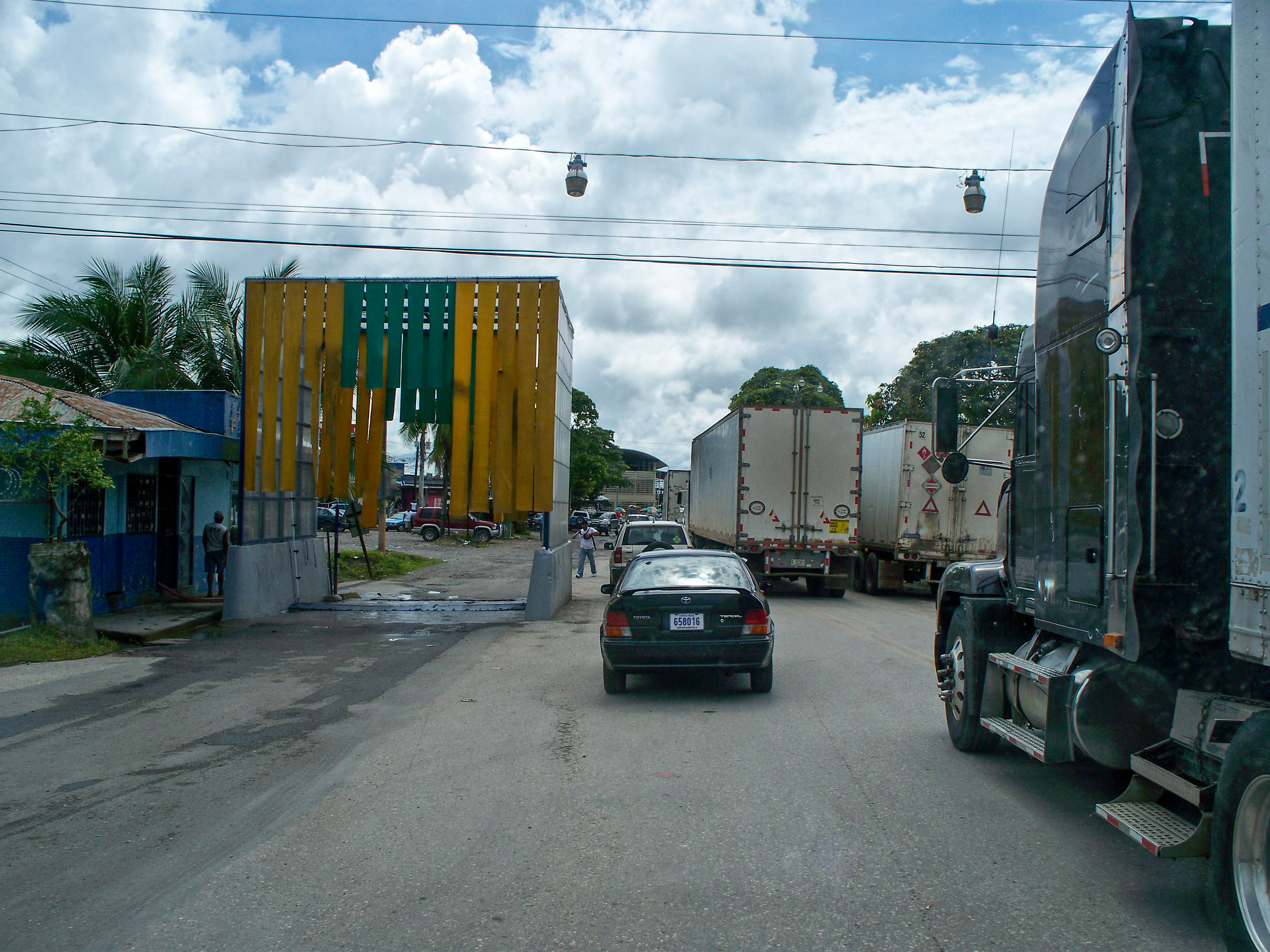
Pan-American Highway, at the border of Costa Rica and Panama

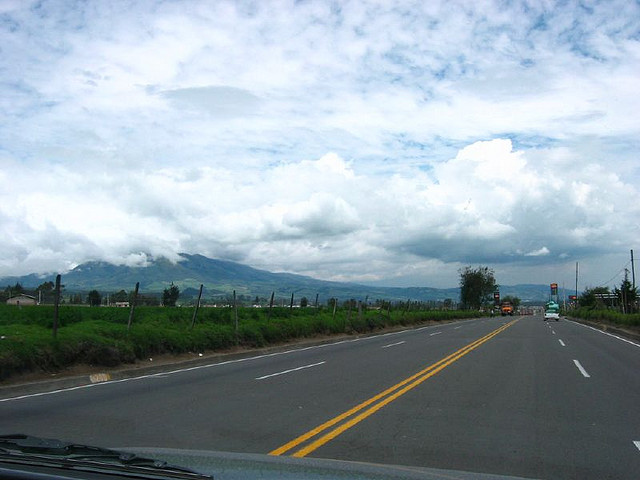
Panamericana – Pan American Highway – in Pichincha, Ecuador, near Cashapamba

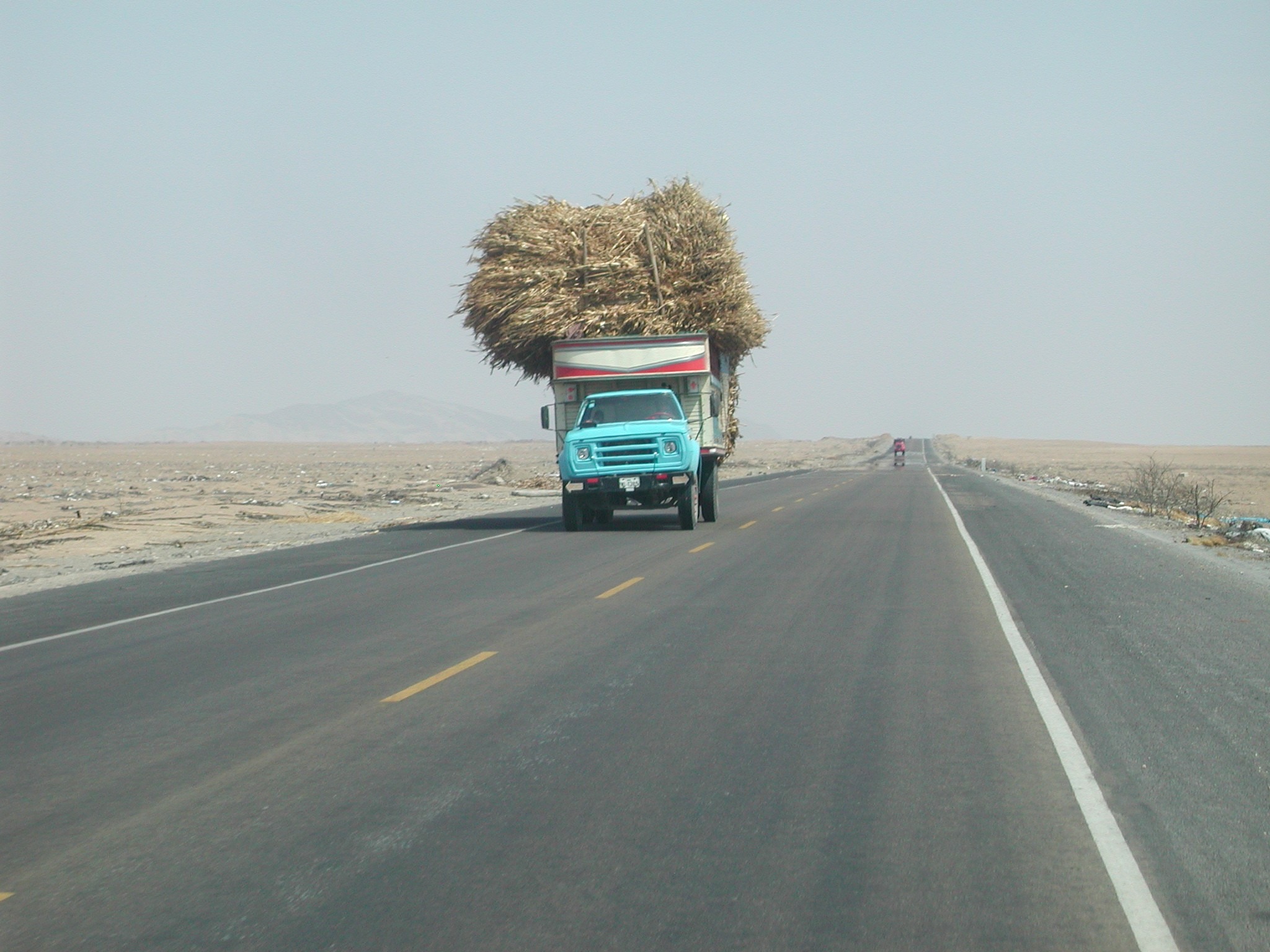
Panamericana – Pan American Highway – northern Peru near Pacasmayo

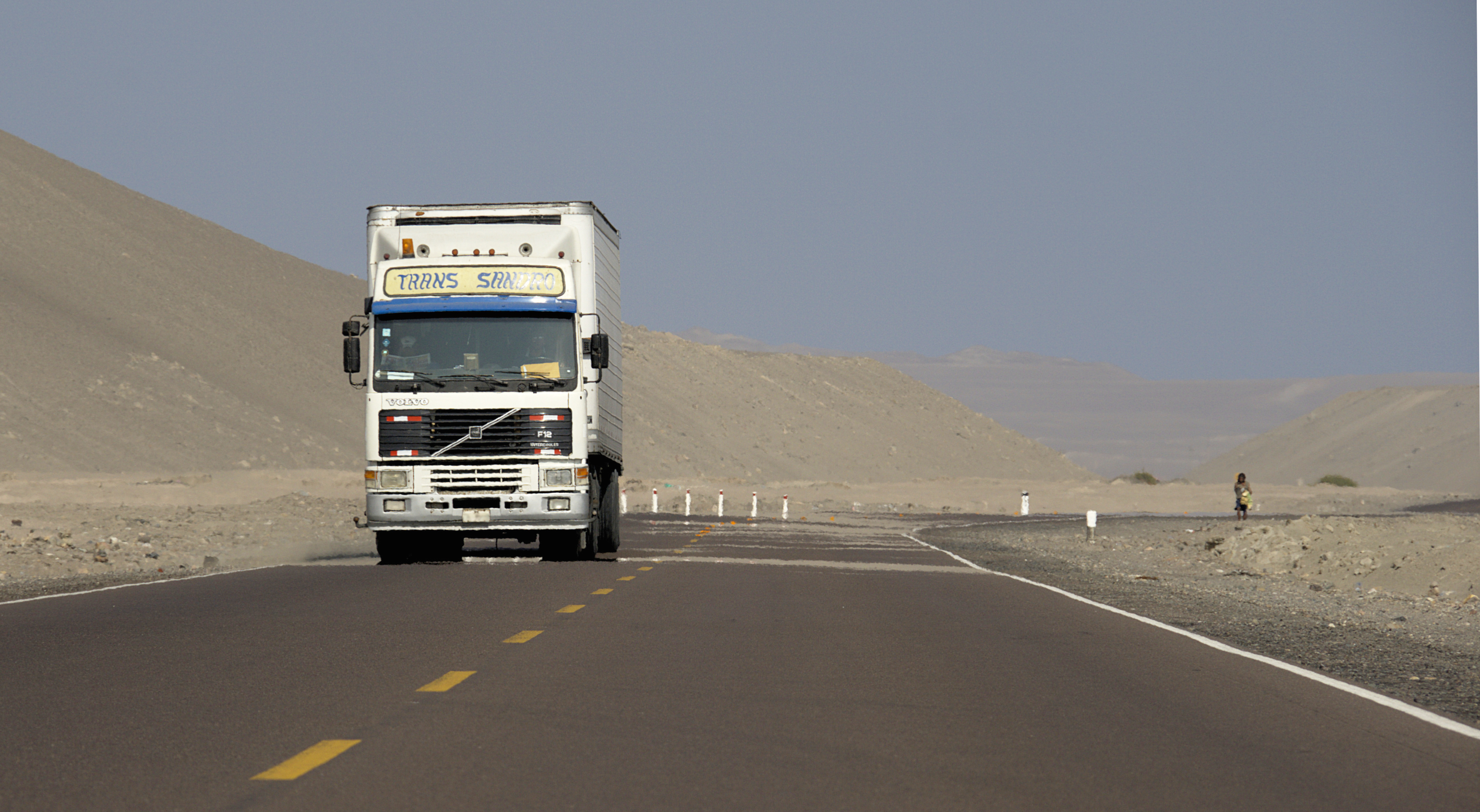
Panamericana – Pan American Highway – near Puerto De Lomas, Peru

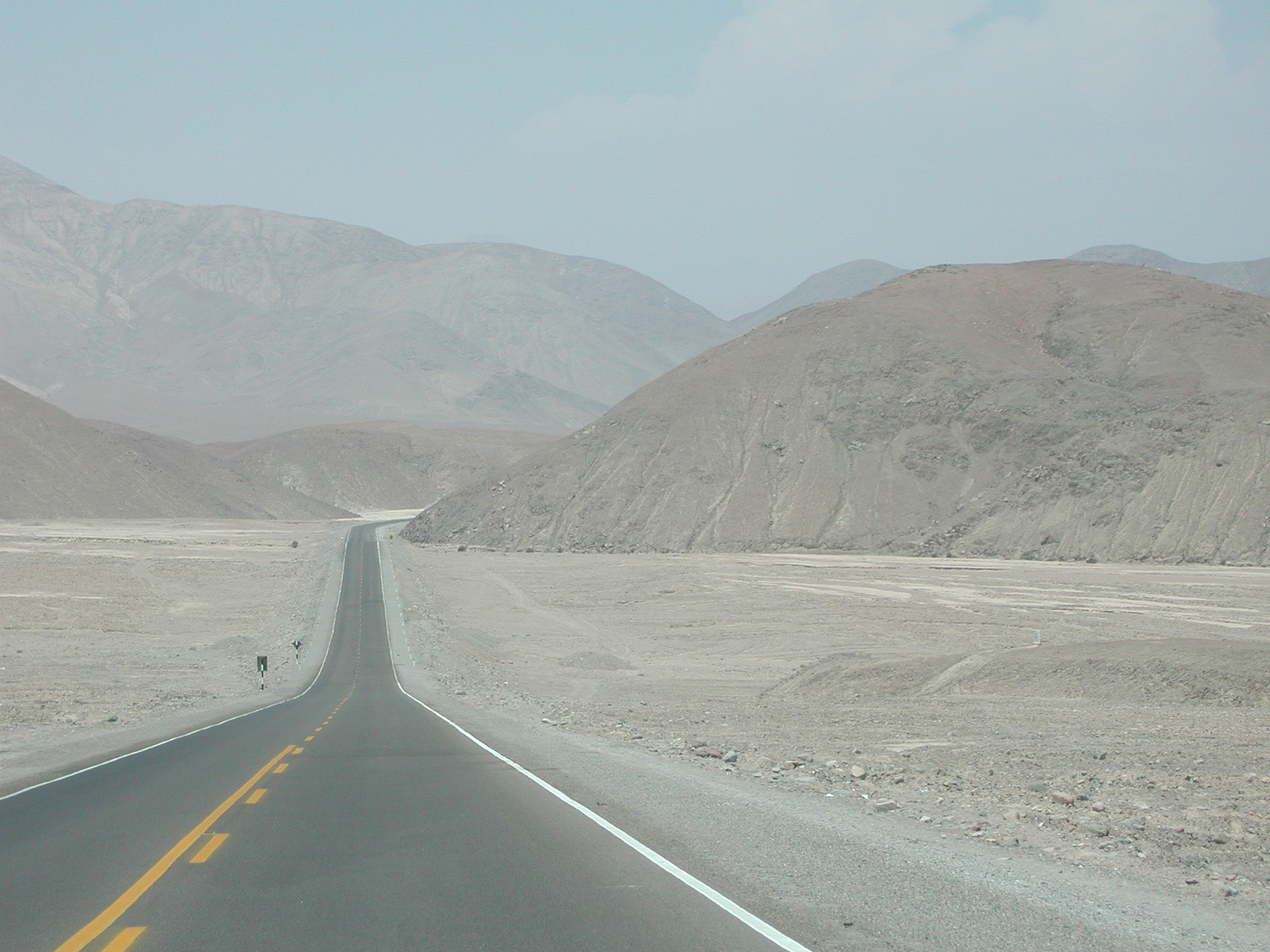
Panamericana – Pan American Highway – in the Atacama Desert northern Chile

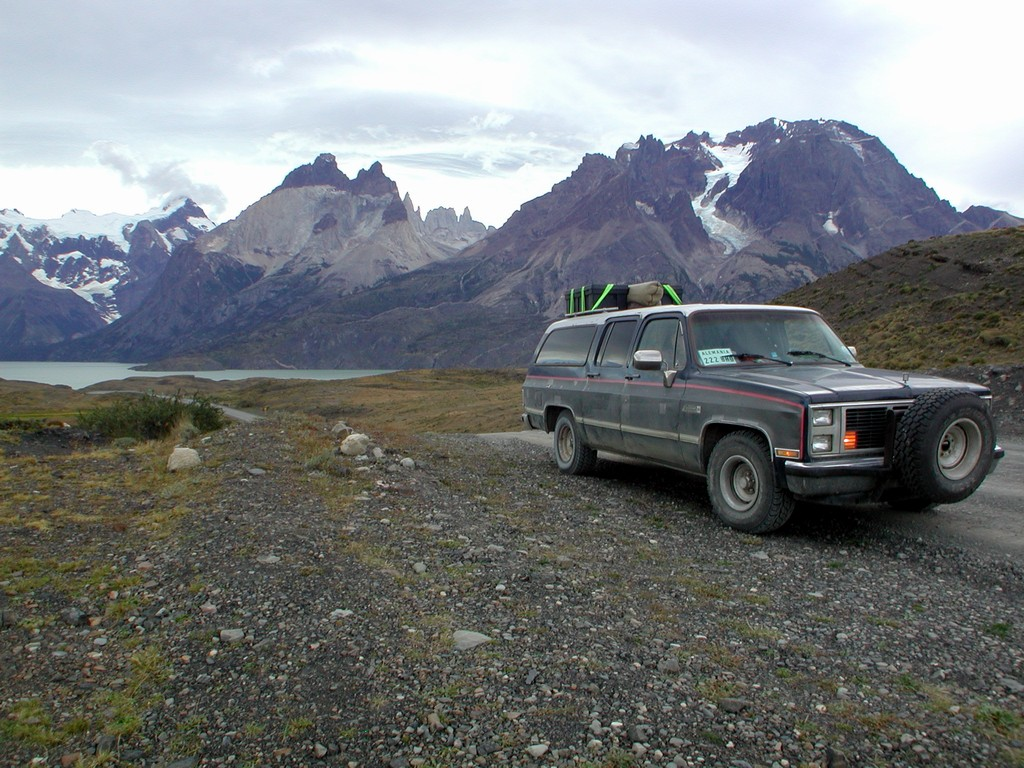
Chevy Suburban traveled all of the Pan-American Highway. Patagonia, Chile.

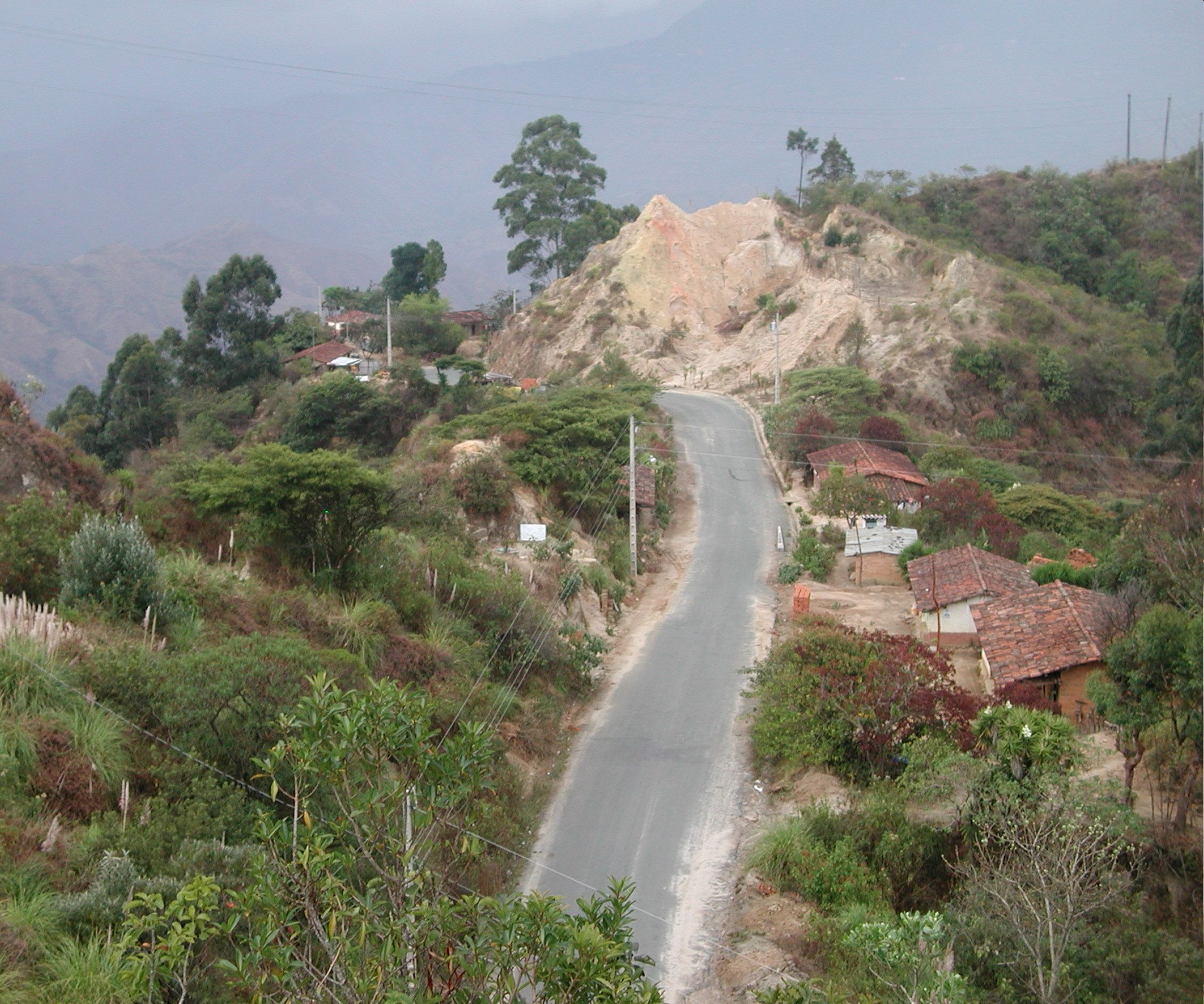
Panamericana – Pan American Highway – in the Cordillera de los Andes, southern Ecuador, near to Catacocha, 2,500 m (8,200 ft) elevation

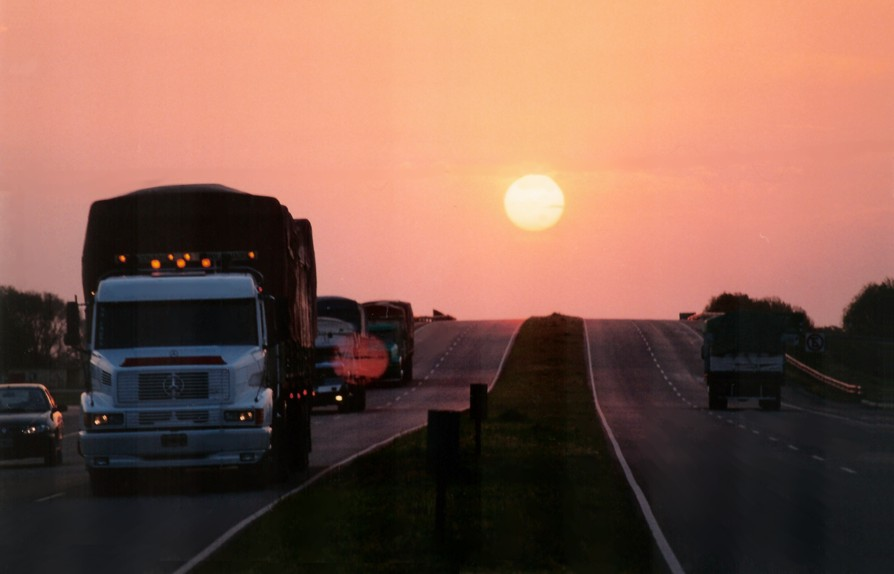
National Route 7—Pan-American Highway in Junín, Buenos Aires, Argentina

== See also ==
- Transport in North America
- Transport in South America
- CANAMEX Corridor
- Continental 1
- NAFTA superhighway
- Other intercontinental highway systems:
  - Arab Mashreq International Road Network
  - Asian Highway Network
  - International E-road network
  - Trans-African Highway network
- Trans-Siberian Highway

== General sources ==
- "Plan Federal Highway System". The New York Times. May 15, 1932. Section XX p. 7.
- "Reported from the Motor World". The New York Times. January 26, 1936. Section XX, p. 6. Archived from the original on July 9, 2021.
- "Hemisphere Road Is Nearer Reality". The New York Times. January 7, 1953. p. 58. Archived from the original on July 9, 2021.
- 1997–98 AAA Caribbean, Central America and South America map
- "Longest Road in the World". Popular Mechanics. March 1943.
- Rand McNally Road Atlas, 1998 edition, p. 120, ISBN 0-528-83918-7
- Institute for Central American Studies – Costa Rica map
- Maps for DXers by Don Moore
