= Storti =

Surname

Storti is an Italian surname. Notable people with the surname include:

- Aurélie Perrillat-Collomb Storti (born 1980), French cross-country skier
- Bebo Storti (born 1956), Italian actor
- Bruno Storti (1913 – 1994), Italian trade unionist and politician
- Cécile Storti (born 1983), French cross-country skier
- Giovanni Storti (born 1957), Italian actor
- Lin Storti (1906 – 1982), American professional baseball player
- Raffaele Storti (born 2000), Portuguese rugby union player
- Tony Storti (1922 – 2009), American football player, coach, and college athletics administrator

== See also ==
- Torti
