= Santa Cruz de Chinina =

- Corregimiento
- Location within Panamá Province Location within Panama
- Coordinates: 8.9833°N 79.0333°W
- Country: Panama
- Province: Panamá
- District: Chepo

Area
  - Land: 351.5 km^{2} (135.7 sq mi)

Population (2010)
  - Total: 1,572
  - Density: 4.5/km^{2} (12/sq mi)
- Population density calculated based on land area.
- Time zone: UTC−5 (EST)

Santa Cruz de Chinina is a corregimiento in Chepo District, Panamá Province, Panama with a population of 1,572 as of 2010. Its population as of 1990 was 1,954; its population as of 2000 was 1,715.

In 2013, the corregimiento Río Lagarto was created by splitting in two the corregimiento Santa Cruz de Chinina.

In 2025, the construction of a $29-million bridge crossing the Bayano river in Chinina was finalized.
