= El Llano, Panama =

El Llano
- Corregimiento
- Location within Panamá Province Location within Panama
- Coordinates: 9.2122°N 78.9642°W
- Country: Panama
- Province: Panamá
- District: Chepo

Area
  - Land: 472.9 km^{2} (182.6 sq mi)

Population (2010)
  - Total: 2,819
  - Density: 6/km^{2} (16/sq mi)
- Population density calculated based on land area.
- Time zone: UTC−5 (EST)

El Llano is a corregimiento in Chepo District, Panamá Province, Panama with a population of 2,819 as of 2010. Its population as of 1990 was 12,393; its population as of 2000 was 2,839.
