= Chepo, Panamá Province =

Chepo
- Corregimiento
- Location in Panamá Province Location in Panama
- Coordinates: 9°10′12″N 79°6′0″W
- Country: Panama
- Province: Panamá
- District: Chepo

Area
  - Land: 438.6 km^{2} (169.3 sq mi)

Population (2010)
  - Total: 20,420
  - Density: 46.6/km^{2} (121/sq mi)
- Population density calculated based on land area.
- Time zone: UTC−5 (EST)
- Climate: Am

Chepo is a town and corregimiento in Chepo District, Panamá Province, Panama with a population of 20,420 as of 2010. It is the seat of Chepo District. Its population as of 1990 was 8,971; its population as of 2000 was 12,734. It is located five kilometers south of the Inter-American Highway. It is a sprawling town that is nearly a suburb of Panama City. It contains a gas station, hospital, ATM, and a variety of stores. The Panamanian Minister of Public Work announced a new highway expansion connecting Pacora to Chepo

The Darién Gap formerly began at Chepo, where the Panamerican Highway ended; after jungle, it begins again at Turbo, Colombia. Chepo was formerly a transshipment point and base for adventure travel outfitters. Since completion of the 230 kilometres (140 mi) paved highway to Yaviza about 2008, most of this economic activity has moved to Metetí or Yaviza.
