= Chepillo =

- Corregimiento
- Location within Panamá Province Location within Panama
- Coordinates: 8°57′14.67″N 79°7′43.33″W
- Country: Panama
- Province: Panamá
- District: Chepo

Area
  - Land: 1 km^{2} (0.39 sq mi)

Population (2010)
  - Total: 255
  - Density: 263.3/km^{2} (682/sq mi)
- Population density calculated based on land area.
- Time zone: UTC−5 (EST)

Chepillo is a corregimiento in Chepo District, Panamá Province, Panama, with a population of 255 as of 2010. Its population as of 1990 was 254; its population as of 2000 was 237.
