= Chepo District =

Chepo
- District

- Location of the district capital in Panama
- Coordinates: 9°10′12″N 79°6′0″W
- Country: Panama
- Province: Panamá
- Capital: Chepo

Area
  - Total: 4,937 km^{2} (1,906 sq mi)

Population (2019)
  - Total: 59,382
  - Density: 12.03/km^{2} (31.15/sq mi)
- official estimate
- Time zone: UTC-5 (ETZ)

Chepo is a district (distrito) of Panamá Province in Panama. The population according to the 2000 census was 32,195; the latest official estimate (for 2019) is 59,382. The district covers a total area of 4,937 km^{2}. The capital lies at the town of Chepo.

== Administrative divisions ==
Chepo District is divided administratively into the following corregimientos:

- San Cristóbal de Chepo (capital)
- Cañita
- Chepillo
- El Llano
- Las Margaritas
- Santa Cruz de Chinina
- Madungandí - a comarca indígena (indigenous territory)
- Tortí

== See also ==
- Chepo River
