= Las Margaritas, Panama =

Las Margaritas
- Corregimiento
- Location within Panamá Province Location within Panama
- Coordinates: 9.1833°N 79.0833°W
- Country: Panama
- Province: Panamá
- District: Chepo

Area
  - Land: 263.6 km^{2} (101.8 sq mi)

Population (2010)
  - Total: 4,991
  - Density: 18.9/km^{2} (49/sq mi)
- Population density calculated based on land area.
- Time zone: UTC−5 (EST)

Las Margaritas is a corregimiento in Chepo District, Panamá Province, Panama with a population of 4,991 as of 2010. Its population as of 1990 was 3,852; its population as of 2000 was 4,500.
