= Tortí =

- Corregimiento
- Location in Panama Tortí (Panama)
- Coordinates: 8°55′16″N 78°23′55″W
- Country: Panama
- Province: Panamá
- District: Chepo
- Established: July 29, 1998

Area
  - Land: 974.5 km^{2} (376.3 sq mi)

Population (2010)
  - Total: 9,297
  - Density: 9.5/km^{2} (25/sq mi)
- Population density calculated based on land area.
- Time zone: UTC−5 (EST)

Tortí is a corregimiento in Chepo District, Panamá Province, Panama with a population of 9,297 as of 2010. It was created by Law 58 of July 29, 1998, owing to the Declaration of Unconstitutionality of Law 1 of 1982. Its population as of 2000 was 8,030.
