= Cañita, Panama =

Cañita
- Corregimiento
- Location within Panamá Province Location within Panama
- Coordinates: 9.2097°N 78.8811°W
- Country: Panama
- Province: Panamá
- District: Chepo

Area
  - Land: 359 km^{2} (139 sq mi)

Population (2010)
  - Total: 2,514
  - Density: 7/km^{2} (18/sq mi)
- Population density calculated based on land area.
- Time zone: UTC−5 (EST)

Cañita is a corregimiento in Chepo District, Panamá Province, Panama with a population of 2,514 as of 2010. Its population as of 1990 was 1,721; its population as of 2000 was 2,140.
