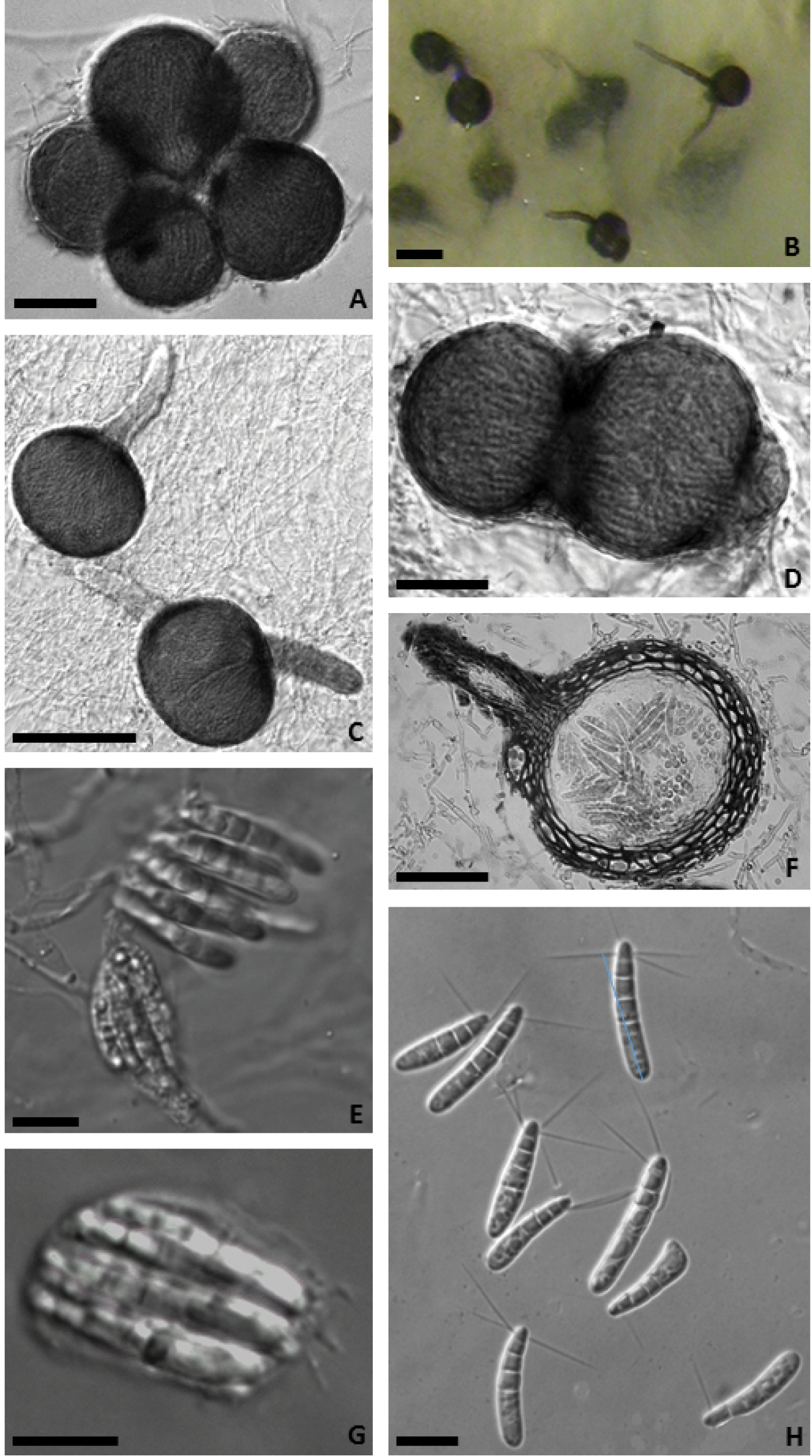
- Elbamycella rosea

Scientific classification
- Kingdom: Fungi
- Division: Ascomycota
- Class: Sordariomycetes
- Order: Torpedosporales
- Family: Juncigenaceae; E.B.G. Jones, Abdel-Wahab & K.L. Pang, Cryptogamie, Mycologie 35(2): 133 (2014)

Type genus
- Juncigena Kohlm., Volkm.-Kohlm. & O.E. Erikss.

= Juncigenaceae =

Family of fungi

Juncigenaceae is a family of ascomycetous marine based fungi within the order of Torpedosporales in the subclass Hypocreomycetidae and within the class Sordariomycetes. They are saprobic to intertidal wood, within mangrove forests and other herbaceous wood and roots, bark, leaves in various marine habitats.

== Genera ==
It contains the following genera (with amount of species);

- Elbamycella (1 species – Elbamycella rosea A. Poli, E. Bovio, V. Prigione & G.C. Varese (2019))
- Fulvocentrum (3 species – Fulvocentrum aegyptiacum (Abdel-Wahab, El-Shar. & E.B.G. Jones) E.B.G. Jones & Abdel-Wahab (2014), Fulvocentrum clavatisporum (Abdel-Wahab, El-Shar. & E.B.G. Jones) E.B.G. Jones & Abdel-Wahab (2014) and Fulvocentrum rubrum M.A. Abdel-Wahab (2018))
- Juncigena (2 species – Juncigena adarca Kohlm., Volkm.-Kohlm. & O.E. Erikss. and Juncigena fruticosae (Abdel-Wahab, Abdel-Aziz & Nagah.) A.N. Mill. & Shearer (2016))
- Khaleijomyces (2 species – Khaleijomyces marinus M.A. Abdel-Wahab (2018) and Khaleijomyces umikazeanus Abdel-Wahab (2021))
- Marinokulati (1 species – Marinokulati chaetosa (Kohlm.) E.B.G. Jones & K.L. Pang)

== History ==
Species Juncigena adarca was initially placed in family Magnaporthaceae in 1997.

Then in an attempt to clarify the phylogeny of the genera Swampomyces Kohlm. & Volkm.-Kohlm. and Torpedospora Meyers, using a DNA study, Sakayaroj et al. (2005) recognised a distinct lineage of marine Ascomycota within the class Sordariomycetes, that was then named TBM (Torpedospora/Bertia/Melanospora) clade by (Schoch et al. 2006). In 2008, species Juncigena adarca was then placed in class Hypocreomycetidae, but with no family attached. Then following a re-evaluation of the marine fungi affiliated to the TBM clade, together with the terrestrial genus Falcocladium, new families were introduced to accommodate its four sub-clades: Juncigenaceae, Etheirophoraceae, Falcocladiaceae, and Torpedosporaceae, which all belonging to the order Torpedosporales (Jones et al. 2014; Abdel-Wahab et al. 2018). Based on phylogeny and morphological data, Maharachchikumbura et al. (2015) introduced the order Falcocladiales (Falcocladiaceae) under the class Sordariomycetes.

Family Juncigenaceae was typified by genus Juncigena by Jones et al. in 2014, and included the genera Fulvocentrum, Marinokulati and Moheitospora. They formed a phylogenetically stable monophyletic clade in a LSU and SSU based phylogeny. Juncigenaceae is sister to Etheirophoraceae, Falcocladiaceae and Torpedosporaceae in the subclass Hypocreomycetidae. Jones et al. (2014) introduced Fulvocentrum to accommodate species Fulvocentrum aegyptiacum and Fulvocentrum clavatisporium, which were previously introduced under Swampomyces sensu stricto. Likewise, the marine ascomycete species Chaetosphaeria chaetosa did not group in Chaetosphaeria sensu stricto (Chaetosphaeriales) and was transferred to a new genus Marinokulati (Jones et al. 2014). Then in Jones et al. (2014), Juncigenaceae was placed in the subclass Hypocreomycetidae, order incertae sedis. This alteration was supported by Maharachchikumbura et al. (2015). Jones et al. (2015) also placed Etheirophoraceae, Juncigenaceae and Torpedosporaceae in order Torpedosporales. Abdel-Wahab et al. (2018) introduced Khaleijomyces as sister genus to genus Juncigena, and added species Fulvocentrum rubrum, Poli et al. then introduced genus Elbamycella as a separate lineage in Juncigenaceae in 2019. From 2 unidentified Sordariomycetes fungi that were isolated from the seagrass species Posidonia oceanica (L.) Delile (Panno et al. 2013), and from the brown alga Padina pavonica (L.) Thivy (Garzoli et al. 2018). Then in 2019, a phylogenetic and morphological study of the two strains that turn out to represent a new genus within the family Juncigenaceae, which was Elbamycella.

Ecologically, the described Juncigenaceae are a fungal species having a marine origin. They had all been retrieved from driftwood in the intertidal zone of salt marshes (Kohlmeyer et al. 1997; Jones et al. 2014). The new species of Elbamycella was found for the first time underwater, in association with the seagrass Posidonia oceanica and also the brown alga Padina pavonica, two different organisms that were sampled in close proximity. This could be related to a means of successful spore dispersal; indeed polar appendages are known to facilitate floatation and attachment (Overy et al. 2019).

== Description ==
Species within the Juncigenaceae family have a sexual morph with perithecial (flask shaped opening) ascomata that are globose, subglobose, ovoid or pyriform (pear-shaped). They are immersed, erumpent to superficial (in the host tissue), subcoriaceous to coriaceous (leather-like), olivaceous-brown, brown to dark–brown to black, hyaline (glass-like) to yellow-orange to reddish-brow (in colour). They are also ostiolate (having an ostiole, a small hole or opening), (having short, thread-like filaments that line the opening), papillate (covering in small hairs) or hyaline to apricot coloured with a long neck surrounded by dense brown, septate (walled) hyphae. The peridium (the protective layer) consists of several cell layers of ellipsoidal to subglobose shaped cells forming a textura angularis (a parenchyma-like tissue of very densely packed cells that appear angular in cross section), textura epidermoidea (tightly packed cells) or both, or textura prismatica (densely packed leptodermatous hyphae) or textura globulosa (packed with rounded cells). The paraphyses (support structures) are numerous, narrow, branched or unbranched, persistent, connected to the apex and base of the peridium or catenophyses (pseudoparenchymatic chains of cells). The Asci are 8–spored, unitunicate (single-walled), thin–walled, persistent, clavate (club-shaped), cymbiform (shaped like a boat), cylindrical to fusiform (spindle-shaped), short pedicellate (small stemmed), with or without an apical ring. The ascospores are 1–3 seriate (arranged in rows), hyaline, ellipsoidal, clavate to fusiform (in shape), unicellular, or 1–4–septate (walled), with or without equatorial and polar or sub-polar appendages. They have an asexual morph that is hyphomycetous (they produce conidia on hyphae). The hyphae are septate, branched, hyaline to brown (in colour). They have conidiogenous cells that are non–specialized, short, light to dark brown (in colour), lateral, solitary, helicoid (spiral shaped) and septate. The conidia are brown, single, helicoid, septate, constricted at the septa (adapted from Abdel- Wahab et al. 2010, Jones et al. 2014, Maharachchikumbura et al. 2015, Poli et al. 2019).

== Distribution ==
It has a scattered cosmopolitan distribution within marine environments. This includes the Mediterranean Sea. Including the Arabian Sea, the Red Sea,

For example, Marinokulati chaetosa is found on decayed driftwood in Bulgaria, Denmark, Germany, Italy, Turkey, Spain, UK and the USA. While Juncigena adarca is only found on the senescent leaves (decaying) of Juncus roemerianus, on the Atlantic coast (U.S.A.: North Carolina).
