= Falcocladium =

Scientific classification
- Kingdom: Fungi
- Division: Ascomycota
- Class: Sordariomycetes
- Subclass: Hypocreomycetidae
- Order: Falcocladiales; R.H. Perera, Maharachch., Somrith., Suetrong & K.D. Hyde
- Family: Falcocladiaceae; Somrith., E.B.G. Jones & K.L. Pang
- Genus: Falcocladium; S.F. Silveira, Alfenas, Crous & M.J. Wingf.

Type species
- Falcocladium multivesiculatum S.F. Silveira, Alfenas, Crous & M.J. Wingf.

Genus of fungi

Falcocladium is a genus of fungi, within the monotypic family Falcocladiaceae Somrith., E.B.G. Jones & K.L. Pang, and within the monotypic order Falcocladiales R.H. Perera, Maharachch., Somrith., Suetrong & K.D. Hyde, within the class Sordariomycetes. They are saprobic on leaf litter, including the leaves of Eucalyptus grandis and Eucalyptus camaldulensis in tropical and terrestrial habitats.

== History ==
Silveira and co-workers (in Crous et al. 1994) erected the new anamorph genus Falcocladium S.F. Silveira, Alfenas, Crous & M.J.Wingf., with Falcocladium multivesiculatum S.F. Silveira, Alfenas, Crous & M.J. Wingf., which was isolated from Eucalyptus leaf litter collected in Brazil, as the type species. It was later compared to other Brazilian found genera; Cylindrodendrum, Pulvinotrichum and Unicegra which also had similar characteristics but due to the falcate (sickle-shaped) conidia. It was declared as a new genera.

Etymology; it was named as Falcocladium, after its falcate shaped conidia.

The Falcocladium genus was characterized by having thick-walled, non septate (non-walled) stipe extensions that terminate in thin-walled vesicles and appendaged, falcate conidia. Other outstanding characters such as sporodochial (small, compact, slightly raised circles) or synnematous (spores lining the outside of the structure) conidiomata (fruiting structures) and stromata composed of thick-walled, red-brown chlamydospores were also described. In Falcocladium multivesiculatum, the vesicles are ellipsoidal and the conidia are more or less septate.

Falcocladium species can be distinguished based on their setal vesicle shape (which are ellipsoidal, sphaeropedunculate (shaped like a sphere on a stalk) or turbinate (shaped like a top or an inverted cone) ) and their conidial dimensions.

The type species; Falcocladium multivesiculatum has a wide host range and mainly occurs on leaves, including those from Eucalyptus grandis and Eucalyptus camaldulensis. The species fits well within the genus concept of Falcocladium with white sporodochia, bearing thick-walled aseptate, stipe extensions and hyaline, 0–1-septate, a falcate shaped conidia, with short apical and basal appendages.

== List of species ==
The genus included five species in 2014, all of which occur on leaves, such as Falcocladium africanum, Falcocladium multivesiculatum, Falcocladium sphaeropedunculatum, Falcocladium turbinatum, and Falcocladium thailandicum.

In 2023, the genus Falcocladium contains 7 known species;

- Falcocladium africanum Crous (2018)
- Falcocladium eucalypti Crous (2019)
- Falcocladium heteropyxidicola Crous (2021)
- Falcocladium multivesiculatum S.F. Silveira, Alfenas, Crous & M.J. Wingf. (1994)
- Falcocladium sphaeropedunculatum Crous & Alfenas (1997)
- Falcocladium thailandicum Crous & Himaman (2007)
- Falcocladium turbinatum Somrith., Sudhom, Tippawan & E.B.G. Jones (2007)

== Distribution ==
The saprobic fungus is distributed mainly in tropical forests, and terrestrial habitats including Thailand, Indonesia, and Brazil.

Falcocladium sphaeropedunculatum Crous & Alfenas sp. nov. was described from living leaves of Eucalyptus pellita F. Muell. × brassiana T.S. Blake collected in the Amazonas province of Brazil. It is a pest risk coming into the United States on unprocessed Eucalyptus logs and chips from South America.

== Falcocladiaceae ==
Following a reevaluation of the marine fungi affiliated to the (Torpedospora/Bertia/Melanospora) clade in the Hypocreomycetidae class, together with the terrestrial genus Falcocladium, several new families were introduced to accommodate its four subclades: Juncigenaceae, Etheirophoraceae, Falcocladiaceae, and Torpedosporaceae, all belonging to the order Torpedosporales (Jones et al. 2014; Abdel-Wahab et al. 2018).

Members of the family of Falcocladiaceae have a sexual morph that is undetermined. The asexual morph is hyphomycetous (they produce conidia on hyphae). They have a hyaline (glass-like) conidiomata, which is sporodochial or synnematal or penicillate (having tufts of fine hairs), intermixed with setae (bristle or hair-like structures), arising from a stroma or microsclerotia or prostrate mycelium. The setae are cylindrical, thick and smooth- walled, hyaline, non-septate and terminating in varied-shaped vesicles. The sub-cylindrical shaped conidiophores are hyaline, septate, branched, forming up to three series of branches per conidioma (primary, secondary and tertiary). The conidiogenous cells ampulliform (flask-shaped), phialidic, arranged in 2–6 whorls, with elongate necks, with minute collarettes. The conidia are trans- (1)-septate, hyaline, smooth- walled, falcate, guttulate (a small spot shaped like a drop), with short apical and basal appendages (adapted from Jones et al. 2014, Maharachchikumbura et al. 2016b).

== Falcocladiales ==
Crous et al. (2007a) used the BLASTn tool to compare ITS and LSU gene regions with reference sequences, suggesting the placement of Falcocladium in the Hypocreales order and they further considered the genus to be polyphyletic (organisms with mixed evolutionary origin). Jones et al. in 2014, then introduced the monotypic family Falcocladiaceae which formed a monophyletic clade in Hypocreomycetidae class, based on analysis of LSU and SSU nuclear genes to accommodate members of Falcocladium. It was then placed in the order Torpedosporales, but they suggested further taxon sampling to properly determine its ordinal status. As they were phylogenetically they are distinct from other genera in the Hypocreomycetidae class and form a monophyletic clade. Based on the LSU and SSU combined gene phylogenetic study, Falcocladiaceae was then placed in Falcocladiales (with Falcocladiaceae family),(Maharachchikumbura et al. 2015). under the class Sordariomycetes.

The Falcocladiales grouped as sister order to Coronophorales and Parasympodiellales with low statistical support (63% maximum likelihood (ML)) in phylogenetic analysis. The divergence time for Falcocladiales has been estimated as 192 MYA (Million years ago).

In a phylogenetic analysis by Réblová et al. (2016b), Falcocladiales showed close affinity to the orders Coronophorales and Melanosporales. Several phylogenetic studies showed similar results (Maharachchikumbura et al. 2016b; Réblová et al. 2016b). Currently, the order includes one hyphomycetous genus Falcocladium introduced by Crous et al. (1994a). Falcocladium species can be distinguished based on morphology of vesicular apices of setae which ranges from ellipsoidal, sphaero-pedunculate to turbinate and conidial measurements (Somrithipol et al. 2007). No sexual morph has been recorded for the family.
