= Scortechinia =

Scientific classification
- Domain: Eukaryota
- Kingdom: Fungi
- Division: Ascomycota
- Class: Sordariomycetes
- Order: Coronophorales
- Family: Nitschkiaceae
- Genus: Scortechinia; Sacc. (1885)

Type species
- Scortechinia acanthostroma (Nitschkia acanthostroma) (Mont.) Sacc. & Berl. (1884)

Genus of fungi

Scortechinia is a genus of fungi in the Ascomycota, of the family Nitschkiaceae.

The genus was circumscribed by Pier Andrea Saccardo in Atti Reale Ist. Veneto Sci. Lett. Arti ser.6, vol.3 on page 713 in 1885.

The genus name of Scortechinia is in honour of Benedetto Scortechini (1845–1886), who was an Italian botanist, explorer, and Roman Catholic priest.

== Species ==
As accepted by Species Fungorum;

- Scortechinia conferta (Schwein.) Subram. & Sekar
- Scortechinia culcitella (Berk. & Ravenel) Speg.
- Scortechinia diminutispora Mugambi & Huhndorf

Former species;

- Scortechinia acanthostroma (Mont.) Sacc. & Berl. (1885) = Nitschkia acanthostroma, Nitschkiaceae
- Scortechinia chaetomioides (Penz. & Sacc.) Arx & E. Müll. (1954) = Nitschkia chaetomioides, Nitschkiaceae
- Scortechinia euomphala (Berk. & M.A. Curtis) Arx & E. Müll. (1954) = Tympanopsis confertula, Scortechiniaceae family
- Scortechinia massae (Cif.) Arx & E. Müll. (1954) = Tympanopsis massae, Scortechiniaceae
- Scortechinia uniseriata (Fitzp.) Arx & E. Müll. (1954) = Nitschkia uniseriata, Nitschkiaceae
- Scortechinia usambarensis (Rehm) Arx & E. Müll. (1954) = Euacanthe usambarensis, Nitschkiaceae
