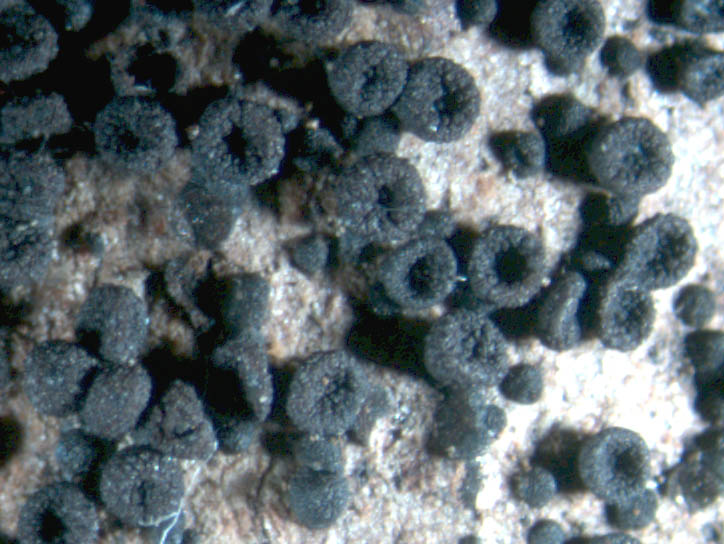
- Bertia hainanensis

Scientific classification
- Domain: Eukaryota
- Kingdom: Fungi
- Division: Ascomycota
- Class: Sordariomycetes
- Order: Coronophorales
- Family: Bertiaceae
- Genus: Bertia; De Not. (1844)

Type species
- Bertia moriformis (Tode) De Not. 1844

Species
- See text.

= Bertia (fungus) =

Genus of fungi

Bertia is a genus of fungi within the Bertiaceae family, and Hypocreomycetidae subclass.

Sakayaroj et al. (2005) recognised a distinct lineage of marine Ascomycota within the class Sordariomycetes, that was then named TBM (Torpedospora/Bertia/Melanospora) clade. Melanospora was later placed in order Melanosporales and Torpedospora in order Torpedosporales.

== Species ==
As accepted by Species Fungorum;

- Bertia antennaroidea Z.Q. Yuan (1997)
- Bertia aparaphysata Rick (1933)
- Bertia australis Speg. (1881)
- Bertia biseptata Sivan. & W.H. Hsieh (1995)
- Bertia clusiae Gonz. Frag. & Cif. (1927)
- Bertia convolutispora K.D. Hyde (1995)
- Bertia didyma (Speg.) Mugambi & Huhndorf (2010)
- Bertia fructicola Henn. (1894)
- Bertia gigantospora (Nannf.) Mugambi & Huhndorf (2010)
- Bertia hainanensis Lar.N. Vassiljeva, Hai X. Ma, Chernyshev & S.L. Stephenson (2015)
- Bertia haloxyli Kravtzev (1955)
- Bertia italica Sacc. & Speg. (1878)
- Bertia latispora (Corlett & J.C. Krug) Lar.N. Vassiljeva (1998)
- Bertia macrospora Sacc. (1879)
- Bertia massei Sacc. (1895)
- Bertia moriformis (Tode) De Not. (1844)
- Bertia ngongensis Mugambi & Huhndorf (2010)
- Bertia novoguineensis Henn. (1894)
- Bertia orbis Mugambi & Huhndorf (2010)
- Bertia oxyspora (Penz. & Sacc.) Höhn. (1909)
- Bertia pulneyensis Subram. & Sekar (1993)
- Bertia puttemansii Henn. (1908)
- Bertia querceti Rehm (1870)
- Bertia quercicola Mouton (1897)
- Bertia sinensis J.C. Krug & Corlett (1988)
- Bertia solorinae Anzi (1868)
- Bertia submoriformis (Plowr.) Sacc. (1882)
- Bertia tessellata Petch (1922)
- Bertia triseptata Mugambi & Huhndorf (2010)
- Bertia tropicalis Huhndorf, A.N. Mill. & F.A. Fernández (2004)
- Bertia turbinata Petch (1922)
- Bertia vitis Schulzer (1870)

Former species;

- B. axillaris Racov. (1959) = Bryostroma axillare, Dothideomycetes
- B. bombarda (Batsch) Ces. & De Not. (1863) = Bombardia bombarda, Bombardiaceae
- B. collapsa Romell (1889) = Nitschkia collapsa, Nitschkiaceae
- B. hydrophila (Kirschst.) Sacc. (1928) = Cercophora hydrophila, Neoschizotheciaceae
- B. lichenicola De Not. (1864) = Rhagadostoma lichenicola, Nitschkiaceae
- B. macrospora Massee (1892) = Bertia masseei
- B. macrospora var. tetraspora Teng (1964) = Bertia macrospora
- B. moriformis f. macrospora Sibilia (1929) = Bertia moriformis
- B. moriformis var. latispora Corlett & J.C. Krug (1985) = Bertia latispora
- B. moriformis var. multiseptata Sivan. (1978) = Bertia moriformis
- B. multiseptata (Sivan.) Huhndorf, A.N. Mill. & F.A. Fernández (2004) = Bertia moriformis
- B. parasitica Fabre (1879) = Pachythyrium parasiticum, Microthyriaceae
- B. phoradendri Rehm (1901) = Rehmiomycella phoradendri, Sordariomycetes
- B. spinifera (Wallr.) Auersw. (1864) = Melogramma spiniferum, Melogrammataceae
