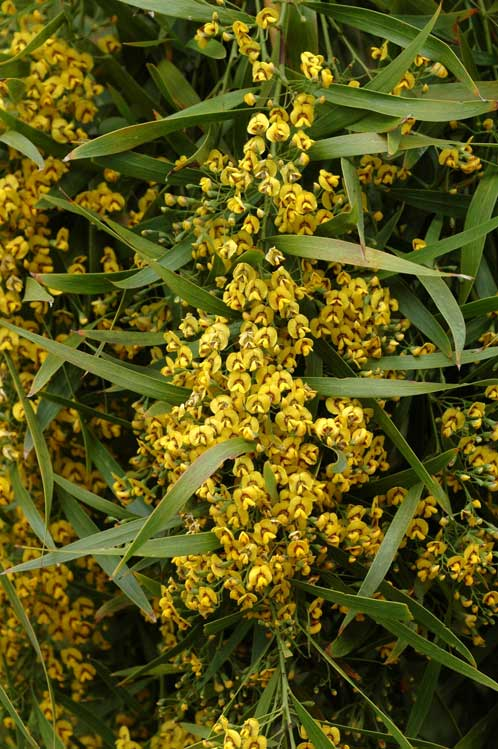
- In the Australian National Botanic Gardens

Scientific classification
- Kingdom: Plantae
- Clade: Tracheophytes
- Clade: Angiosperms
- Clade: Eudicots
- Clade: Rosids
- Order: Fabales
- Family: Fabaceae
- Subfamily: Faboideae
- Genus: Daviesia
- Species: D. arborea

Binomial name
- Daviesia arborea W.Hill

Synonyms
- Daviesia arborea F.Muell. & Scort. ex Scort. nom. illeg.; Daviesia corymbosa var. arborea (W.Hill) Maiden

= Daviesia arborea =

Golden pea

Species of flowering plant

Daviesia arborea, commonly known as golden pea or bitterleaf pea, is a species of flowering plant in the family Fabaceae and is endemic to eastern Australia. It is a shrub or small tree with weeping branches, linear phyllodes and yellow flowers with red markings.

== Description ==
Daviesia arborea is a shrub or small that typically grows to a height of up to 14 m (46 ft) and has weeping branches and corky bark. The phyllodes are linear to elliptic, 40–200 mm (1.6–7.9 in) long and 4–12 mm (0.16–0.47 in) wide with fine, parallel veins and the lower surface is paler than the upper. The flowers are arranged in racemes of eight to fifteen flowers on a flowering stem 10–27 mm (0.39–1.06 in) long, including the peduncle 2–4 mm (0.079–0.157 in) long, each flower on a pedicel 2–8 mm (0.079–0.315 in) long. The five sepals are 4.0–5.5 mm (0.16–0.22 in) long and joined at the base, the upper two sepals joined in a shortened "lip", the lower three shorter and triangular. The standard petal is yellow with red markings around a yellow centre and 7–8 mm (0.28–0.31 in) long and wide, the wings about 7.5 mm (0.30 in) long and the keel is yellow and dark red and about 5 mm (0.20 in) long. Flowering occurs from September to October and the fruit is a triangular pod 7–9 mm (0.28–0.35 in) long.

== Taxonomy and naming ==
Daviesia arborea was first formally described in 1805 by W.Hill in his book Collection of Queensland Timbers - Melbourne International Exhibition of 1880. The specific epithet (arborea) means "tree" or "tree-like".

== Distribution ==
Golden pea mostly grows in moist forest on coastal hills and mountains slopes from the Bunya Mountains in south-east Queensland to near Comboyne in New South Wales.

== Use in horticulture ==
This large shrub is an attractive plant with it drooping branches and clusters of sweet-smelling flowers in spring. It can be grown from scarified seed and grows best in semi-shaded, moist situation in well-drained soil.
