= Bossiaea scortechinii =

Scientific classification
- Kingdom: Plantae
- Clade: Tracheophytes
- Clade: Angiosperms
- Clade: Eudicots
- Clade: Rosids
- Order: Fabales
- Family: Fabaceae
- Subfamily: Faboideae
- Genus: Bossiaea
- Species: B. scortechinii

Binomial name
- Bossiaea scortechinii (Andrews) Sm.
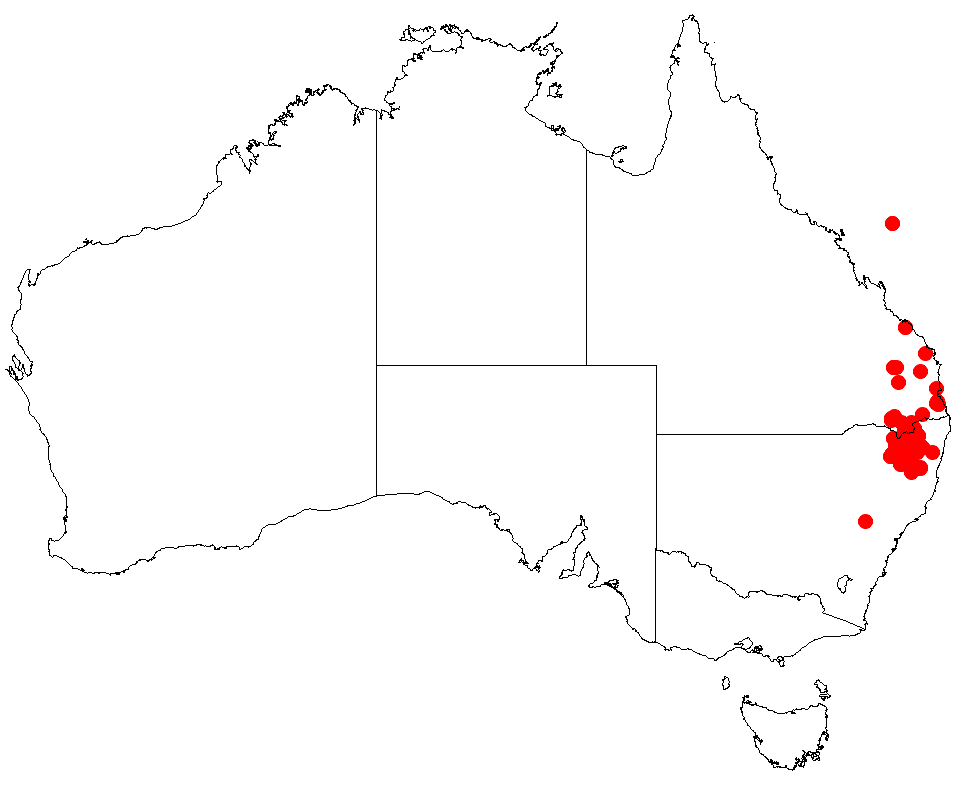
- Occurrence data from AVH

Species of legume

Bossiaea scortechinii is a species of flowering plant in the family Fabaceae and is endemic to eastern Australia. It is a prostrate to low-lying shrub with simple, elliptic to egg-shaped leaves with the narrower end towards the base, and orange-yellow flowers with red to pinkish markings.

== Description ==
Bossiaea scortechinii is a prostrate to low-lying shrub that typically grows to up to 0.4 m (1 ft 4 in) high and 1 m (3 ft 3 in) wide. The leaves are arranged alternately along the branches, elliptic to egg-shaped with the narrower end towards the base, 5–15 mm (0.20–0.59 in) long and 2–5 mm (0.079–0.197 in) wide on a petiole 0.5–0.8 mm (0.020–0.031 in) long. The flowers are about 7 mm (0.28 in) long on pedicels mostly 3–9 mm (0.12–0.35 in) long with a few bracts 1–2 mm (0.039–0.079 in) long at the base and narrow oblong to linear bracteoles about 1.0–2.5 mm (0.039–0.098 in) long near the middle of the pedicel. The five sepals are 3–5 mm (0.12–0.20 in) long and joined at the base forming a tube, the upper lobes 2–3 mm (0.079–0.118 in) long and 1.5–2.0 mm (0.059–0.079 in) wide, the lower lobes 0.7–1.0 mm (0.028–0.039 in) wide. The standard petal is orange-yellow sometimes with a red base, and about 10 mm (0.39 in) long, the wings yellow, about the same length as the keel and about 1.5 mm (0.059 in) wide, and the keel pink and about 2–3 mm (0.079–0.118 in) wide. Flowering mainly occurs in spring and the fruit is a hairy, oblong pod 10–20 mm (0.39–0.79 in) long.

== Taxonomy ==
Bossiaea scortechinii was first formally described in 1883 by Ferdinand von Mueller in the Southern Science Record from specimens collected by Benedetto Scortechini near the Dumaresq River near Stanthorpe.

== Distribution and habitat ==
Bossiaea scortechinii grows in forest on sandy or granitic soils between Miriam Vale in south-eastern Queensland and Inverell in north-eastern New South Wales.
