= Scortechini =

Scortechini is an Italian surname. Notable people with the surname include:

- Alessia Scortechini (born 1997), Italian swimmer
- Benedetto Scortechini (1845–1886), Italian botanist, explorer, and priest
