= Leucocoprinus flavipes =

Scientific classification
- Kingdom: Fungi
- Division: Basidiomycota
- Class: Agaricomycetes
- Order: Agaricales
- Family: Agaricaceae
- Genus: Leucocoprinus
- Species: L. flavipes

Binomial name
- Leucocoprinus flavipes Pat. & Gaillard (1888)

Synonyms
- Hiatula flavipes Sacc. (1891)

Species of fungus

Leucocoprinus flavipes
- Mycological characteristics
- Gills on hymenium
- Cap is campanulate or flat
- Hymenium is free
- Stipe has a ring
- Spore print is white
- Ecology is saprotrophic
- Edibility is unknown

Leucocoprinus flavipes is a species of mushroom producing fungus in the family Agaricaceae.

== Taxonomy ==
It was first described in 1888 by the French mycologists Narcisse Théophile Patouillard and Albert Gaillard who classified it as Leucocoprinus flavipes.

In 1891 the species was included in Pier Andrea Saccardo's Sylloge fungorum omnium hucusque cognitorum as Hiatula flavipes resulting in the creation of this as a synonym.

== Description ==
Leucocoprinus flavipes is a small white dapperling mushroom with thin flesh.

Cap: 3-5cm wide and very thin, campanulate and flattening with age with an umbo or central disc. The surface is pure white and has striations running to the centre disc, which is smooth and greenish. Stem: 10-12cm tall and 3-5mm thick and brittle with a 10mm thick bulbous base. The surface is greenish yellow whilst the interior is hollow. The membranous stem ring is white and is movable but may disappear. Gills: Free with a wide collar, crowded and white. The gills are thin and delicate. Spore print: White. Spores: Subglobose with a large apical germ pore. No measurements are provided in the 1888 text and likely would not be accurate by modern standards if they were.

Patouillard and Gaillard describe the mushroom as being very ephemeral and disappearing soon after the sun rises. They compare it to Coprinus though note it is not deliquescent and to Hiatula fragilissima (now known as Leucocoprinus fragillissimus). This species may be a synonym of L. fragillissimus that has not been reclassified or a similar species that has just been mostly forgotten.

== Habitat and distribution ==
The specimens studied by Patouillard and Gaillard were found in humus on the edge of the woods on the left bank of the Orinoco river opposite Puerto-Zamuro in Venezuela.

== Similar species ==
- Leucocoprinus fragillissimus
