= Ceratostoma (fungus) =

Scientific classification
- Kingdom: Fungi
- Division: Ascomycota
- Class: Sordariomycetes
- Order: Melanosporales
- Family: Ceratostomataceae
- Genus: Ceratostoma Fr. 1818

Species
- See text

Genus of fungi

Ceratostoma is a genus of fungi within the Ceratostomataceae family.

== Species ==
- Ceratostoma albocoronata
- Ceratostoma albomaculans
- Ceratostoma arcuatirostre
- Ceratostoma asininum
- Ceratostoma avocetta
- Ceratostoma barbata
- Ceratostoma biparasiticum
- Ceratostoma caminatum
- Ceratostoma capillare
- Ceratostoma carpophilum
- Ceratostoma cinctum
- Ceratostoma cinereum
- Ceratostoma conicum
- Ceratostoma corticola
- Ceratostoma crassicolle
- Ceratostoma culmicola
- Ceratostoma cuspidatum
- Ceratostoma cylindracea
- Ceratostoma decipiens
- Ceratostoma dispersum
- Ceratostoma exasperans
- Ceratostoma fairmanii
- Ceratostoma fallax
- Ceratostoma foliicola
- Ceratostoma fuscellum
- Ceratostoma geranii
- Ceratostoma grumsinianum
- Ceratostoma haematorhynchum
- Ceratostoma hystricina
- Ceratostoma jani-collinum
- Ceratostoma javanicum
- Ceratostoma juniperina
- Ceratostoma juniperinum
- Ceratostoma marylandicum
- Ceratostoma melanosporioides
- Ceratostoma melaspermum
- Ceratostoma mexicanense
- Ceratostoma moravicum
- Ceratostoma mucronatum
- Ceratostoma multirostratum
- Ceratostoma notarisii
- Ceratostoma parasiticum
- Ceratostoma penicillus
- Ceratostoma plectotheca
- Ceratostoma praetervisum
- Ceratostoma procumbens
- Ceratostoma pyrinum
- Ceratostoma querceticola
- Ceratostoma robustum
- Ceratostoma rosae
- Ceratostoma rosellinoides
- Ceratostoma rubefaciens
- Ceratostoma saponariae
- Ceratostoma schulzeri
- Ceratostoma setigerum
- Ceratostoma spina
- Ceratostoma spinella
- Ceratostoma spurium
- Ceratostoma stilbum
- Ceratostoma strictum
- Ceratostoma stromaticum
- Ceratostoma subdenudatum
- Ceratostoma subpilosum
- Ceratostoma subrufum
- Ceratostoma subulatum
- Ceratostoma therryanum
- Ceratostoma tinctum
- Ceratostoma truncatum
- Ceratostoma usterianum
- Ceratostoma vasculosum
- Ceratostoma venetum
- Ceratostoma vitis
- Ceratostoma vitreum
