= Rhagadostoma =

Scientific classification
- Domain: Eukaryota
- Kingdom: Fungi
- Division: Ascomycota
- Class: Sordariomycetes
- Order: Coronophorales
- Family: Nitschkiaceae
- Genus: Rhagadostoma; Körb. (1865)

Type species
- Rhagadostoma corrugatum Körb. (1865)

Synonyms
- Castagnella G.Arnaud (1914)

Genus of fungi

Rhagadostoma is a genus of fungi in the family Nitschkiaceae. All species in the genus are lichenicolous, meaning they live parasitically on lichens.

== Species ==
As of August 2022, Species Fungorum accepts 8 species of Rhagadostoma. The following list of Rhagadostoma species gives the name, taxonomic authority (standard abbreviations are used), year of publication (or transfer into this genus), and host species (or host genus). Host information is from Diederich and colleagues' 2018 review on lichenicolous fungi.

- Rhagadostoma boleae Nav.-Ros. & Hladun (1994) – host: Lecania
- Rhagadostoma brevisporum (Nav.-Ros. & Hladun) Nav.-Ros. (1999) – Nephroma, Peltigera, Solorina
- Rhagadostoma coccifera (G.Arnaud) E.Müll. (1962)
- Rhagadostoma collematum Etayo & Nav.-Ros. (1999) – host: Lathagrium auriforme
- Rhagadostoma lichenicola (De Not.) Keissl. (1930) – host: Solorina
- Rhagadostoma pannariae Etayo (2008) – host: Pannaria
- Rhagadostoma rugosum Nav.-Ros. & Hladun (1994) – host: Verrucaria nigrescens
- Rhagadostoma verrucariarum Nav.-Ros. & Hladun (1994) – host: Verrucaria
