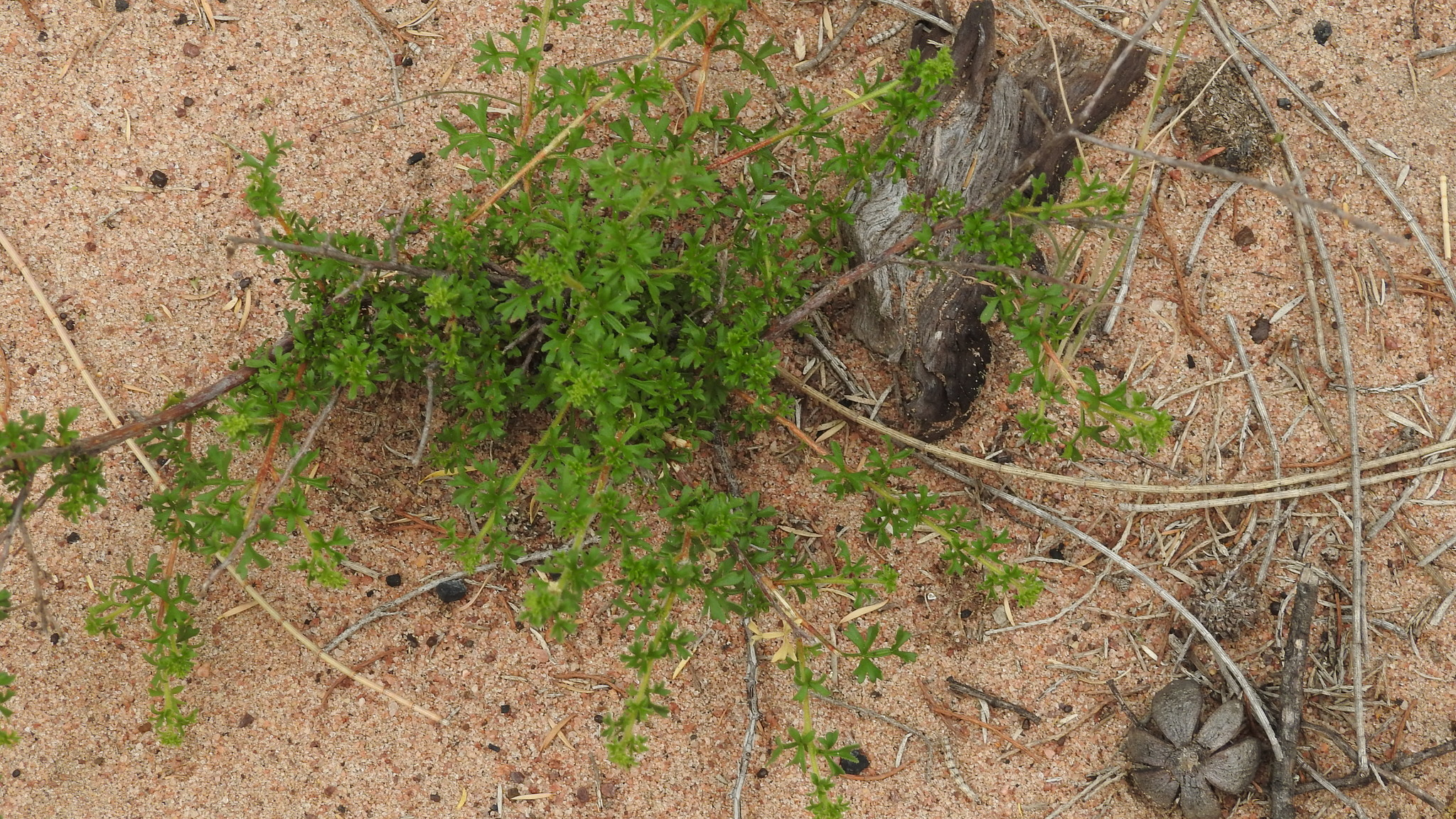
- Near Kumbarilla

Scientific classification
- Kingdom: Plantae
- Clade: Tracheophytes
- Clade: Angiosperms
- Clade: Eudicots
- Clade: Rosids
- Order: Sapindales
- Family: Sapindaceae
- Genus: Dodonaea
- Species: D. macrossanii

Binomial name
- Dodonaea macrossanii F.Muell. & Scort.

Synonyms
- Dodonaea macrossani F.Muell. orth. var.

= Dodonaea macrossanii =

Species of shrub

Dodonaea macrossanii is a species of plant in the family Sapindaceae and is endemic to a small area of eastern Australia. It is a spreading, dioecious shrub with imparipinnate leaves with usually four triangular or egg-shaped leaflets, the narrower end towards the base, flowers arranged singly with three lance-shaped sepals and six stamens, and 3- or 4-lobed capsules.

== Description ==
Dodonaea macrossanii is a spreading, dioecious shrub that typically grows to a height of up to 30 cm (12 in). Its leaves are imparipinnate, 20–60 mm (0.79–2.36 in) long on a petiole 0.8–1.4 mm (0.031–0.055 in) long, with between two and six triangular or egg-shaped leaflets with the narrower end towards the base, 1.8–4 mm (0.071–0.157 in) long and 1–3.2 mm (0.039–0.126 in) wide with a wedge-shaped base and two or three teeth at the tip. The flowers are arranged singly on a pedicel 0.7–0.8 mm (0.028–0.031 in) long with three egg-shaped sepals, 1.5–2.0 mm (0.059–0.079 in) long and six stamens. The ovary is covered with soft hairs. The fruit is a usually a three-lobed, elliptic capsule 2–3.5 mm (0.079–0.138 in) long and 4–6 mm (0.16–0.24 in) wide.

== Taxonomy ==
Dodonaea macrossanii was first formally described in 1882 by Ferdinand von Mueller in The Chemist and Druggist with Australasian Supplement from specimens collected by Benedetto Scortechini near Miles.

== Distribution and habitat ==
This species of Dodonaea grows in woodland and grows in the Darling Downs area of south-eastern Queensland and near Yetman in northern New South Wales.

== Conservation status ==
Dodonaea macrossanii is listed as of "least concern" under the Queensland Government Nature Conservation Act 1992.
