= Lasiosphaeriopsis =

Scientific classification
- Kingdom: Fungi
- Division: Ascomycota
- Class: Sordariomycetes
- Order: Coronophorales
- Family: Nitschkiaceae
- Genus: Lasiosphaeriopsis; D.Hawksw. & Sivan. (1980)

Type species
- Lasiosphaeriopsis salisburyi D.Hawksw. & Sivan. (1980)

Genus of lichens

Lasiosphaeriopsis is a genus of lichenicolous (lichen-dwelling) fungi in the family Nitschkiaceae. It comprises seven species.

== Taxonomy ==
The genus was circumscribed by David Hawksworth and Asaipillai Sivanesan in 1980, with Lasiosphaeriopsis salisburyi assigned as the type species. Lasiosphaeriopsis was described as similar to Lasiosphaeriella, but the two genera are readily separated by their ascospores. Lasiosphaeriopsis has pigmented spores with 3–4 cross-walls (septa) and no gelatinous coating, while Lasiosphaeriella has transparent (hyaline) spores with 3 cross-walls to wall-like divisions and a gelatinous sheath.

== Description ==
Lasiosphaeriopsis is a lichen-dwelling (lichenicolous) fungus placed within the Coronophorales in a broad sense. It forms small, black, carbonaceous stromata that sit on the surface of the host rather than being immersed. These fruiting bodies are usually clustered, short-stalked and irregularly obovoid, with a coarse, warted surface and one to several internal chambers. Each stroma bears an ostiole (a minute pore) lined with periphyses—fine sterile hairs that fringe the opening. The stroma wall is thick and stratified, built of dark brown, brick-like cells (pseudoparenchyma) that include tiny perforations often referred to as "Munk pores"; the cells become elongated within the stalk.

Inside, the asci are elongated, club-shaped and long-stalked. They are unitunicate (with a single functional wall), lack a visible apical apparatus, and usually contain two to four spores. Paraphyses (sterile filaments common in many ascomycetes) are absent. The ascospores are broadly spindle-shaped and divided by three to four cross-walls; they are brown overall but tend to be paler to nearly colourless at the ends. The spore surface is smooth and there is no surrounding gelatinous sheath.

== Species ==
- Lasiosphaeriopsis cephalodiorum (Rostr.) Alstrup (1994)
- Lasiosphaeriopsis christiansenii Alstrup & D.Hawksw. (1990)
- Lasiosphaeriopsis lecanorae Pérez-Ort. & Halıcı (2008)
- Lasiosphaeriopsis pilophori Zhurb. & Triebel (2005)
- Lasiosphaeriopsis salisburyi D.Hawksw. & Sivan. (1980)
- Lasiosphaeriopsis stereocaulicola (Th.Fr. ex Linds.) O.E.Erikss. & R.Sant. (1986)
- Lasiosphaeriopsis supersparsa (Arnold) Triebel (1989)
