= Spathulosporaceae =

Scientific classification
- Kingdom: Fungi
- Division: Ascomycota
- Class: Sordariomycetes
- Order: Spathulosporales
- Family: Spathulosporaceae; Kohlm., 1973

Genera
- Spathulospora (5); Retrostium (1)

Family of fungi

Spathulosporaceae is a family of fungi in the order Spathulosporales and Hypocreomycetidae subclass.
