= Neopeckia =

Scientific classification
- Kingdom: Fungi
- Division: Ascomycota
- Class: Dothideomycetes
- Subclass: incertae sedis
- Genus: Neopeckia; Sacc. (1883)

Type species
- Neopeckia coulteri (Peck) Sacc. (1883)

Genus of fungi

Neopeckia is a genus of fungi in the class Dothideomycetes. The relationship of this taxon to other taxa within the class is unknown (incertae sedis).

The genus name of Neopeckia is in honour of Charles Horton Peck (1833–1917), who was an American mycologist. He has described over 2,700 species of North American fungi.

The genus was circumscribed by Pier Andrea Saccardo in Bull. Torrey Bot. Club vol.10 on page 127 in 1883.

== Species ==
- Neopeckia anceps
- Neopeckia argentinensis
- Neopeckia asperulispora
- Neopeckia bambusae
- Neopeckia brasiliana
- Neopeckia carpini
- Neopeckia constricta
- Neopeckia coulteri
- Neopeckia episphaeria
- Neopeckia fulcita
- Neopeckia herpotrichioides
- Neopeckia japonica
- Neopeckia nitidula
- Neopeckia nobilis
- Neopeckia oryzopsis
- Neopeckia palustris
- Neopeckia parietalis
- Neopeckia pumila
- Neopeckia quercina
- Neopeckia rhodostoma
- Neopeckia roberti

Transferred species;

- Neopeckia caesalpiniae now Herpotrichia caesalpiniae in Melanommataceae family
- Neopeckia diffusa now Herpotrichia diffusa (Melanommataceae)
- Neopeckia hainanensis now Byssosphaeria hainanensis (Melanommataceae)
- Neopeckia rhodosticta now Herpotrichia rhodosticta (Melanommataceae)
- Neopeckia thaxteri now Spinulosphaeria thaxteri in Sordariomycetidae family.

== See also ==
- List of Dothideomycetes genera incertae sedis
