= Crassochaeta =

Scientific classification
- Kingdom: Fungi
- Division: Ascomycota
- Class: Sordariomycetes
- Order: Coronophorales
- Family: Chaetosphaerellaceae
- Genus: Crassochaeta; Réblová

Type species
- Crassochaeta nigrita Réblová

Genus of fungi

Crassochaeta is a genus of fungi within the Chaetosphaerellaceae family.

== Species ==
As accepted by Species Fungorum;

- Crassochaeta fusispora (Sivan.) Réblová (1999)
- Crassochaeta nigrita (Sacc.) Réblová (1999)
