= Gymnopilus rufopunctatus =

Scientific classification
- Kingdom: Fungi
- Division: Basidiomycota
- Class: Agaricomycetes
- Order: Agaricales
- Family: Hymenogastraceae
- Genus: Gymnopilus
- Species: G. rufopunctatus

Binomial name
- Gymnopilus rufopunctatus (Pat. & Gaillard) Dennis

Synonyms
- Pholiota rufopunctata Pat. & Gaillard

Species of fungus

Gymnopilus rufopunctatus
- Mycological characteristics
- Gills on hymenium
- Cap is convex
- Hymenium is adnexed or adnate
- Ecology is saprotrophic

Gymnopilus rufopunctatus is a species of mushroom-forming fungus in the family Hymenogastraceae.

== See also ==
- List of Gymnopilus species
