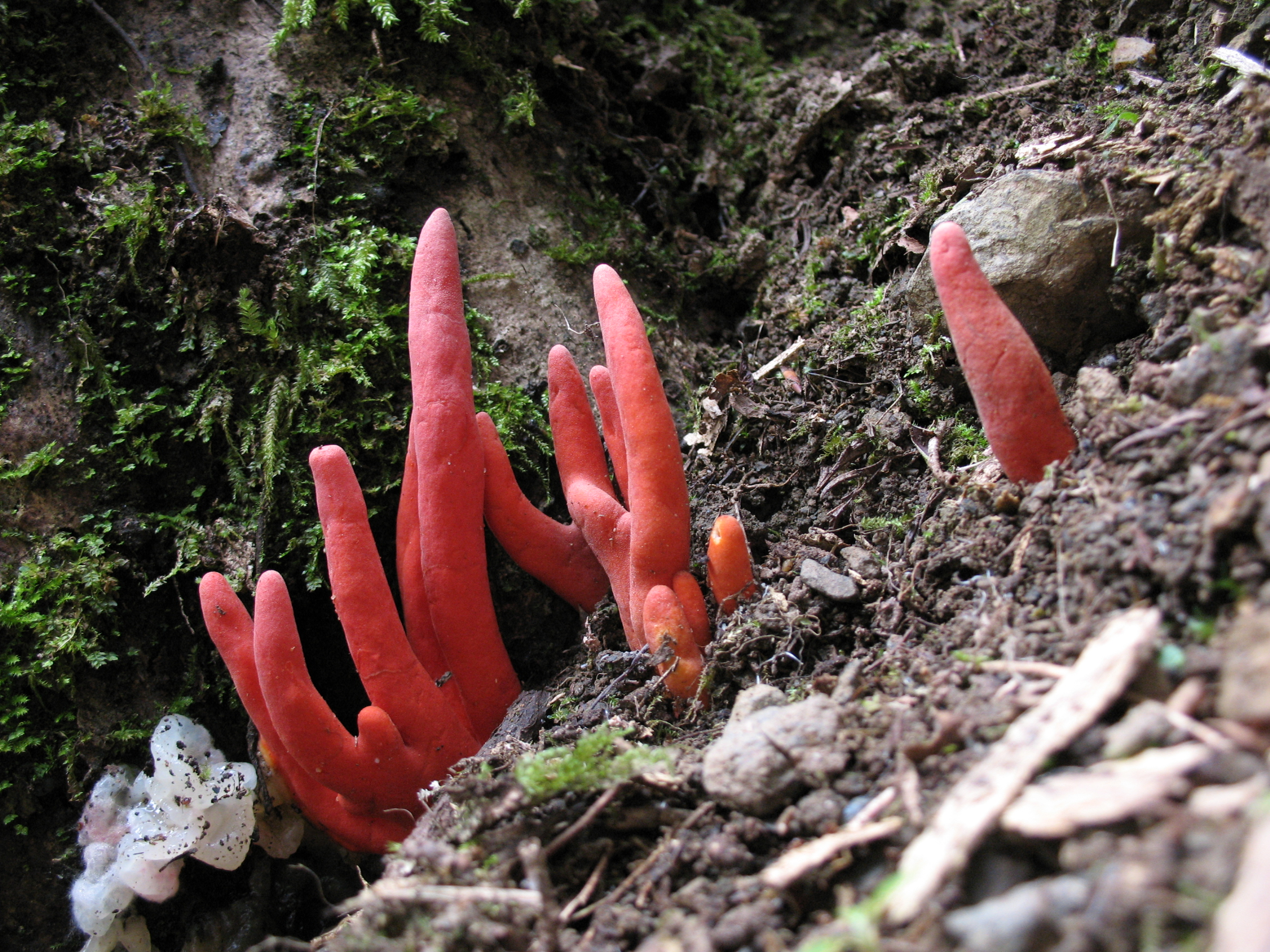
- Trichoderma cornu-damae

Scientific classification
- Kingdom: Fungi
- Division: Ascomycota
- Class: Sordariomycetes
- Subclass: Hypocreomycetidae; O.E.Erikss. & Katarina Winka (1997)

Orders
- See text

= Hypocreomycetidae =

Subclass of fungi

Hypocreomycetidae is a subclass of sac fungi.

It is a highly diverse group of fungi with species from various habitats. This subclass has been reported as pathogenic, endophytic, parasitic, saprobic, fungicolous, lichenicolous, algicolous, coprophilous (animal dung) and insect fungi from aquatic and terrestrial habitats.

The members of Hypocreomycetidae have light colored perithecia, non-amyloid or amyloid ascal rings, or those which lack apical rings and most taxa lack true paraphyses (Zhang et al. 2006). Hypocreomycetidae was established by Eriksson and Winka (1997) based on morphology and a single gene (SSU) phylogenetic analysis.

The subclasses of Sordariomycetes was expanded from three to six, when Eriksson & Winka (1997) introduced Hypocreomycetidae, Sordariomycetidae and Xylariomycetidae based on morphology and nrDNA sequence data.

The crown and stem ages of Hypocreomycetidae are 290 MYA and 302 331 MYA, respectively.

Within Sordariomycetes, Savoryellomycetidae shows a freshwater ancestor, whereas Diaporthomycetidae, Sordariomycetidae, Lulworthiomycetidae and Xylariomycetidae show a terrestrial ancestor. Hypocreomycetidae shows terrestrial ancestors, whereas marine and freshwater taxa have independently evolved.

== Orders ==
As accepted by Wijayawardene et al. 2022;

- Cancellidiales - Cancellidiaceae (2, Cancellidium (6) and Obliquiminima (1))
- Coronophorales
  - Bertiaceae (2)
  - Ceratostomataceae (16)
  - Chaetosphaerellaceae (3)
  - Coronophoraceae (1)
  - Nitschkiaceae (13)
  - Scortechiniaceae (11)
- Falcocladiales - Falcocladiaceae (1 - Falcocladium)
- Glomerellales
  - Australiascaceae (1 - Monilochaetes)
  - Glomerellaceae (1 - Colletotrichum)
  - Malaysiascaceae (1 - Malaysiasca)
  - Plectosphaerellaceae (24)
  - Reticulascaceae (4)
- Hypocreales
  - Bionectriaceae (47)
  - Calcarisporiaceae (1)
  - Clavicipitaceae (50)
  - Cocoonihabitaceae (1 - Cocoonihabitus)
  - Cordycipitaceae (21)
  - Cylindriaceae (1 - Cylindrium)
  - Flammocladiellaceae (1 - Flammocladiella)
  - Hypocreaceae (17)
  - Myrotheciomycetaceae (4)
  - Nectriaceae (70)
  - Niessliaceae (21)
  - Ophiocordycipitaceae (12)
  - Sarocladiaceae (2)
  - Stachybotryaceae (39)
  - Tilachlidiaceae (3)
- Jobellisiales - Jobellisiaceae (1)
- Microascales (Halosphaeriales)
  - Ceratocystidaceae (11)
  - Chadefaudiellaceae (2)
  - Gondwanamycetaceae (2)
  - Graphiaceae (1)
  - Halosphaeriaceae (68)
  - Microascaceae (23)
  - Triadelphiaceae (2)
- Pararamichloridiales - Pararamichloridiaceae (1)
- Parasympodiellales - Parasympodiellaceae (1)
- Torpedosporales
  - Etheirophoraceae (2)
  - Juncigenaceae (6)
  - Torpedosporaceae (1 - Torpedospora)

== Incertae sedis genera ==
- Ascocodinaea
- Etheirophora
- Porosphaerellopsis
