= Spinulosphaeria =

Scientific classification
- Kingdom: Fungi
- Division: Ascomycota
- Class: Sordariomycetes
- Order: Coronophorales
- Family: Chaetosphaerellaceae
- Genus: Spinulosphaeria; Sivan.

Type species
- Spinulosphaeria thaxteri (Pat.) Sivan., (1974)

Genus of fungi

Spinulosphaeria is a genus of fungi in the Sordariomycetes class (subclass Sordariomycetidae) of the Ascomycota. It was placed in 2020, within the Order Coronophorales and in the family of Chaetosphaerellaceae.

It was thought to be a monotypic genus, containing the single species Spinulosphaeria thaxteri, until 2010 when Spinulosphaeria nuda Mugambi & Huhndorf (2010) was discovered on decorticated fallen logs in Puerto Rico.
