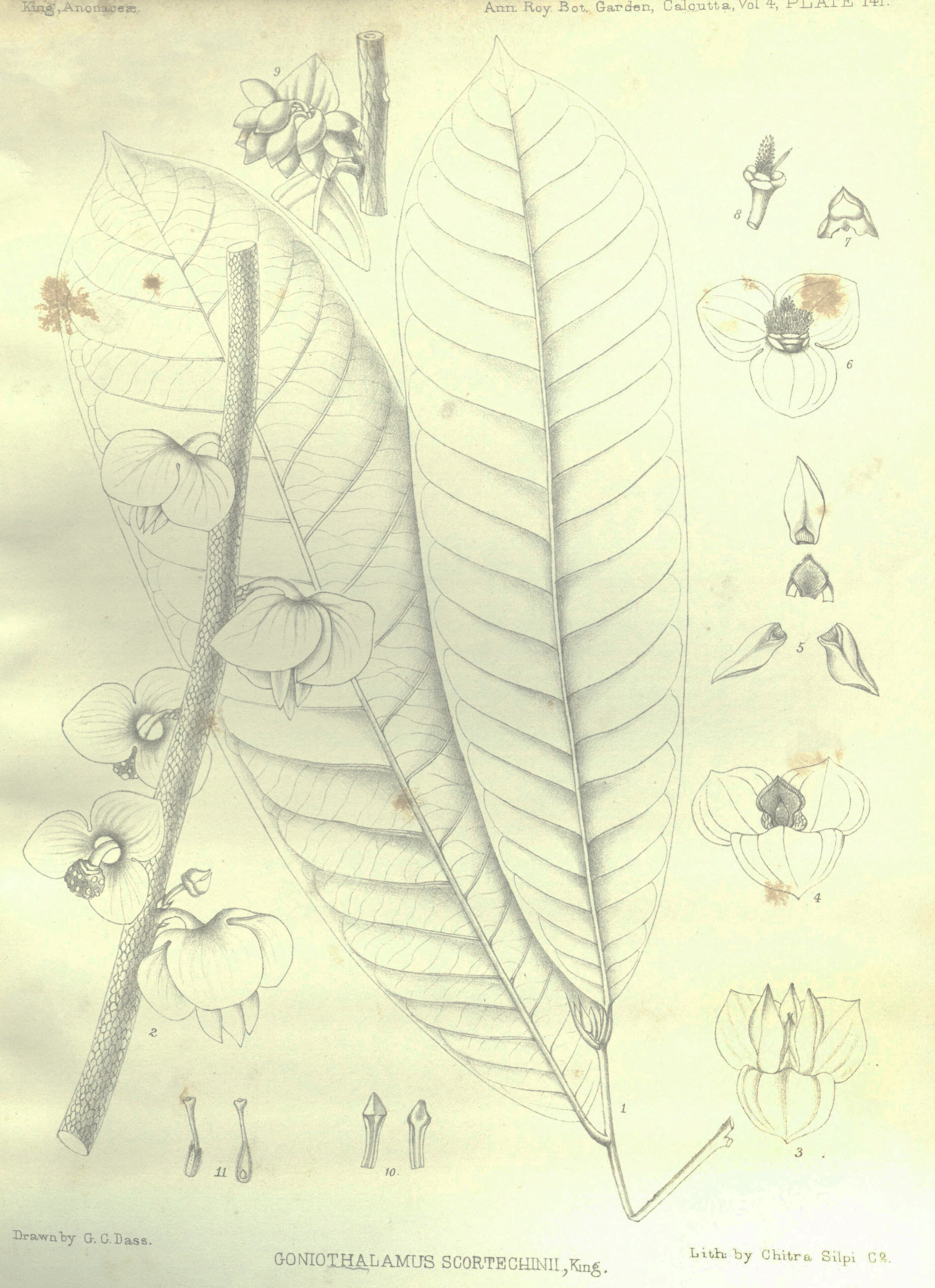
- Botanical illustration of Goniothalamus scortechinii

Conservation status
- Least Concern (IUCN 3.1)

Scientific classification
- Kingdom: Plantae
- Clade: Embryophytes
- Clade: Tracheophytes
- Clade: Spermatophytes
- Clade: Angiosperms
- Clade: Magnoliids
- Order: Magnoliales
- Family: Annonaceae
- Genus: Goniothalamus
- Species: G. scortechinii

Binomial name
- Goniothalamus scortechinii King

= Goniothalamus scortechinii =

Species of plant in the soursop family

Goniothalamus scortechinii is a species of plant in the family Annonaceae. It is native to Peninsular Malaysia and Thailand. George King, the British botanist who first formally described the species, named it in honor of Benedetto Scortechini, an Italian priest and member of the Linnean Society of London and New South Wales who collected many important botanical samples in Peninsular Malaysia.

== Description ==
It is a tree reaching 7 meters (23 ft) in height. Its membranous, oblong to lance-shaped leaves are 22–50 by 5.5–19.5 centimeters (8.7–19.7 by 2.2–7.7 in) with short tapering tips and pointed bases. Its leaves have 18–32 pairs of secondary veins emanating from their midribs that arch near the leaf margins. Its petioles are 0.8 centimeters long. Its 3 membranous, rigid, round to oval sepals are 0.8–2.4 by 0.8–2.3 centimeters with shallowly pointed tips and fused at bases. Its solitary (rarely in pairs) flowers are in axillary positions and on pedicels that are 1.27 centimeters long. The pedicels are thicker at their apex, curved downward and have two bracts at their base. Its flowers have 6 petals arranged in two rows of three. The leathery, oblong to lance-shaped outer petals are 1.7–2.5 by 0.8–1.4 centimeters with shallow tips. The outer petals are covered in fine rust colored hairs. The leathering, oval inner petals are 1.3 centimeters long with pointed tips. The inner petals are covered in fine rust colored hairs. Its flowers have 126–180 stamen. Its flowers have 15–32 carpels. Each carpel has 1 ovule, a straight style, and a 2–3 lobed stigma. Its fruit are on pedicels that are 0.8–2.0 centimeters long. The hairless, oval to oblong fruit are 1.1 centimeters long and have persistent calyx. The fruit have pale, smooth, hairless to sparsely hairy seeds.

=== Reproductive biology ===
The pollen of G. scortechinii is shed as permanent tetrads.

== Habitat and distribution ==
It has been observed growing in rainforests at elevations of 30–500 meters (98–1,600 ft).

== Uses ==
It is commonly called akar gajah beranak and is used in traditional medicine. Bioactive molecules extracted from its leaves have been reported to have antiplasmodial, and antibacterial activity.
