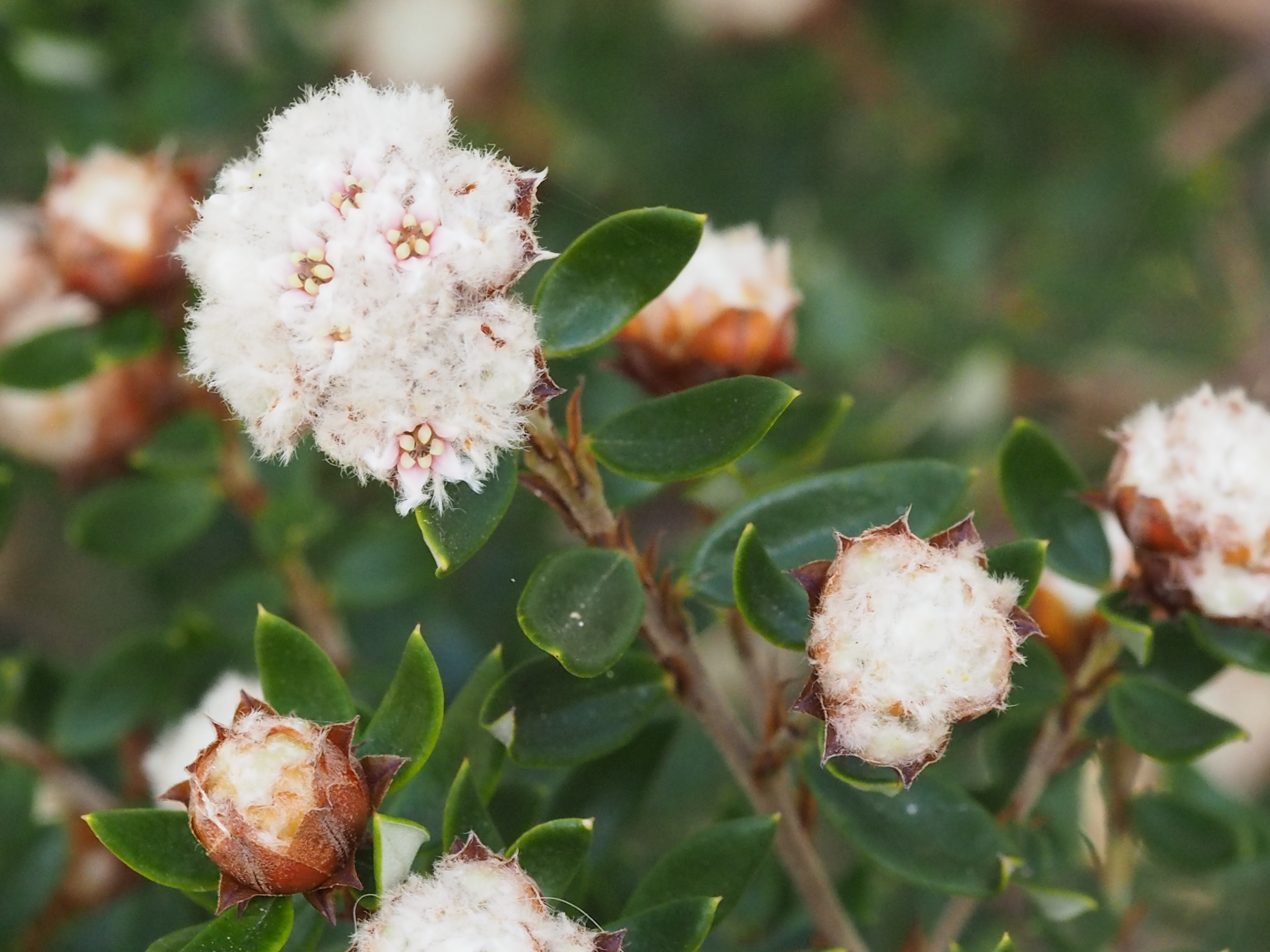
- In the Armidale Arboretum

Scientific classification
- Kingdom: Plantae
- Clade: Tracheophytes
- Clade: Angiosperms
- Clade: Eudicots
- Clade: Rosids
- Order: Rosales
- Family: Rhamnaceae
- Genus: Spyridium
- Species: S. scortechinii

Binomial name
- Spyridium scortechinii (F.Muell.) K.R.Thiele

= Spyridium scortechinii =

Species of shrub

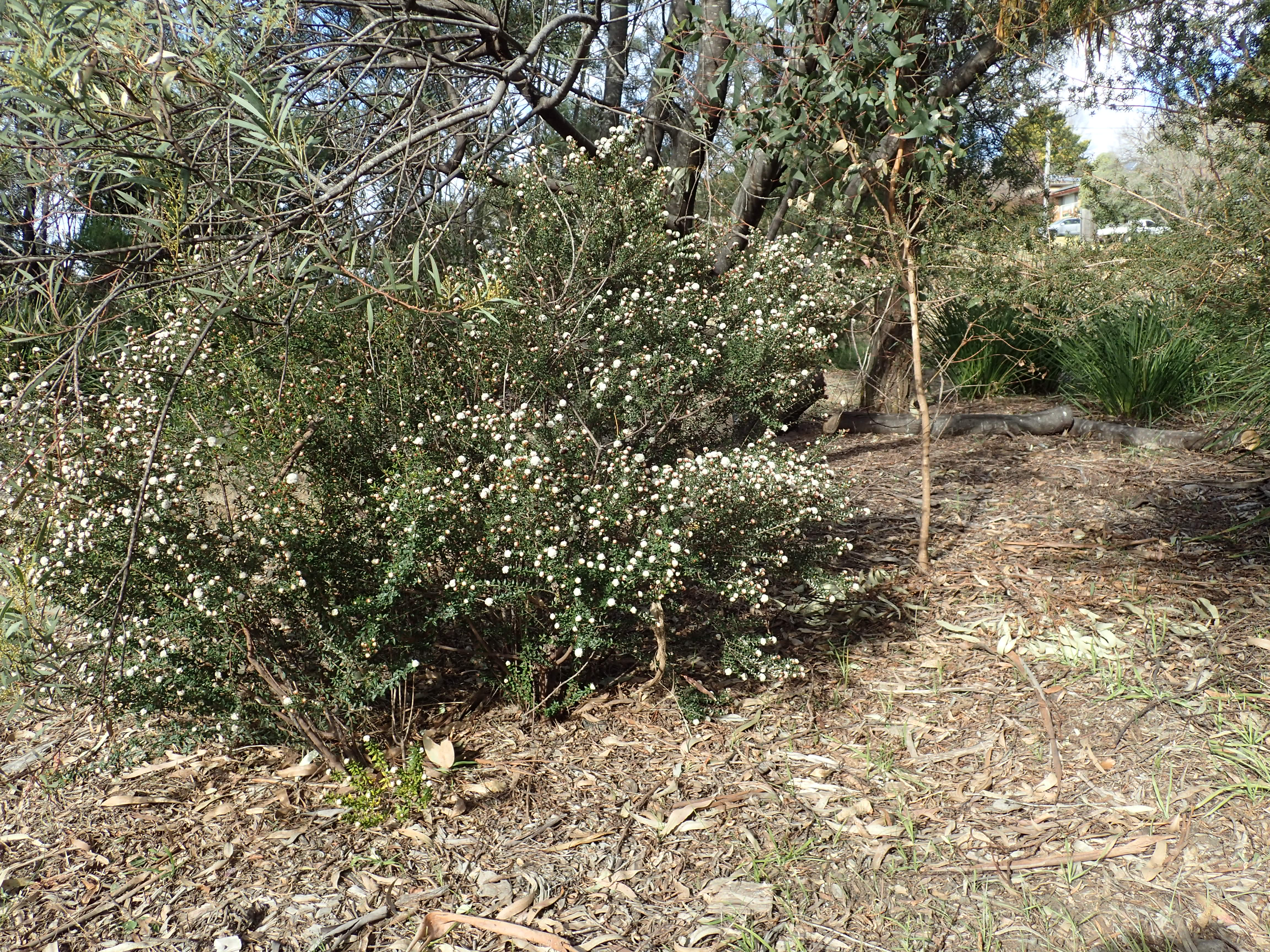
Habit in the Armidale Arboretum

Spyridium scortechinii is a species of flowering plant in the family Rhamnaceae and is endemic to eastern Australia. It is a shrub with egg-shaped to narrowly elliptic leaves, and dense heads of white, woolly-hairy flowers with brown bracts at the base.

== Description ==
Spyridium scortechinii is a shrub that typically grows to a height of up to 50 cm (20 in). Its leaves are egg-shaped to narrowly lance-shaped, 6–15 mm (0.24–0.59 in) long and 1–5 mm (0.039–0.197 in) wide with linear brown stipules 2–3 mm (0.079–0.118 in) long at the base. The upper surface of the leaves is dark green and the lower surfaces in usually covered with greyish, woolly hairs. The heads of flowers are 10–15 mm (0.39–0.59 in) wide, arranged on the ends of branches and are 5–20 mm (0.20–0.79 in) wide, the heads and the individual flowers with brown bracts at the base. The flowers are 4–5 mm (0.16–0.20 in) long and covered with woolly white hairs. Flowering occurs from late winter to spring.

== Taxonomy ==
This species was first formally described in 1884 by Ferdinand von Mueller who gave it the name Cryptandra scortechinii in The Australasian Chemist and Druggist, of specimens collected by Benedetto Scortechini near the Severn River. In 2004, Kevin Thiele changed the name to Spyridium scortechinii in the journal Telopea.

== Distribution ==
Spyridium scortechinii is widespread from south-east Queensland to Bermagui in New South Wales, but mainly on the ranges.
