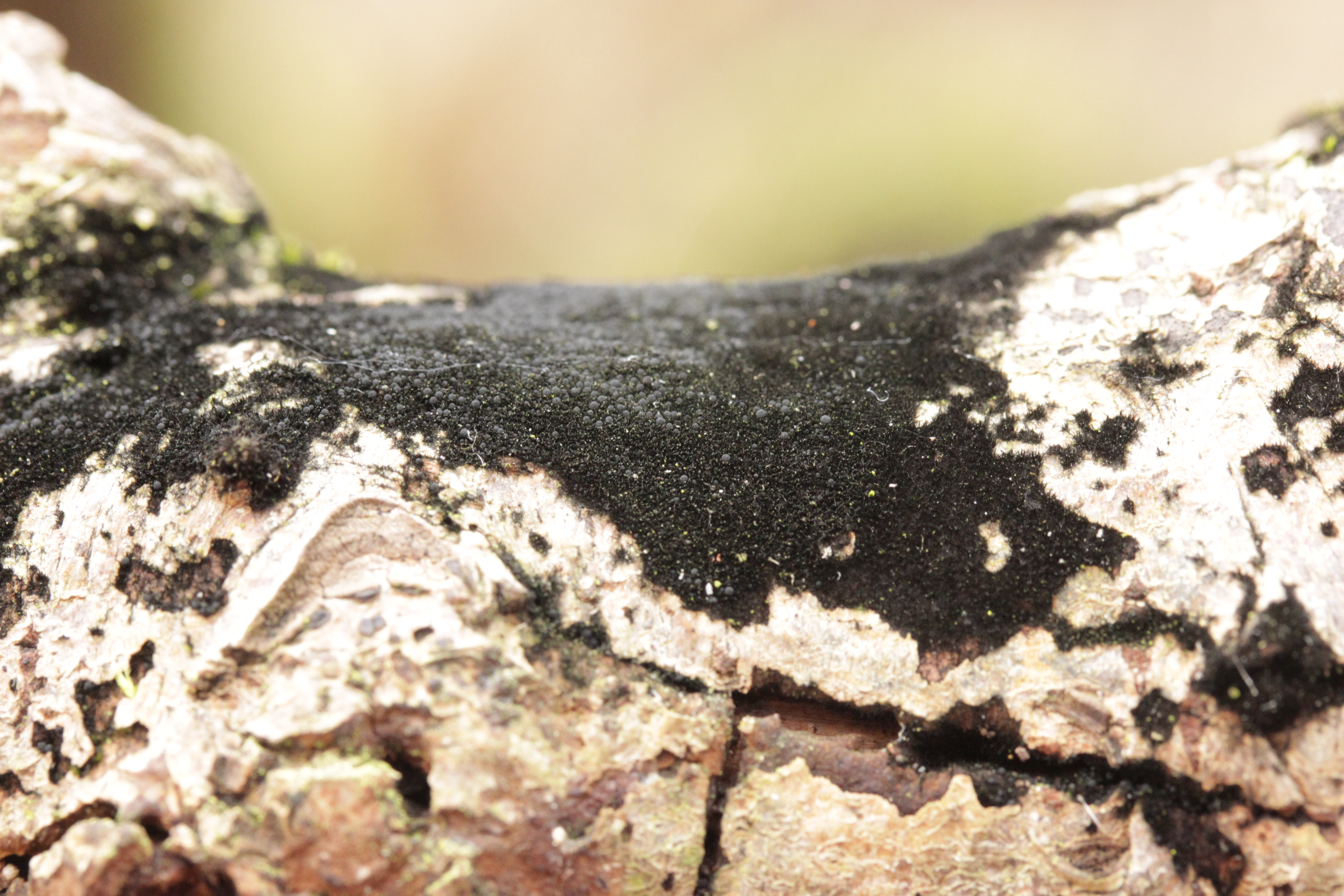
- Chaetosphaerella phaeostroma

Scientific classification
- Domain: Eukaryota
- Kingdom: Fungi
- Division: Ascomycota
- Class: Lecanoromycetes
- Genus: Chaetosphaerella; E. Müll. & C. Booth

Type species
- Chaetosphaerella phaeostroma (Durieu & Mont.) E. Müll. & C. Booth

Species
- C. fusca C. phaeostroma

= Chaetosphaerella =

Genus of fungi

Chaetosphaerella is a genus of fungi within the Chaetosphaerellaceae family.
