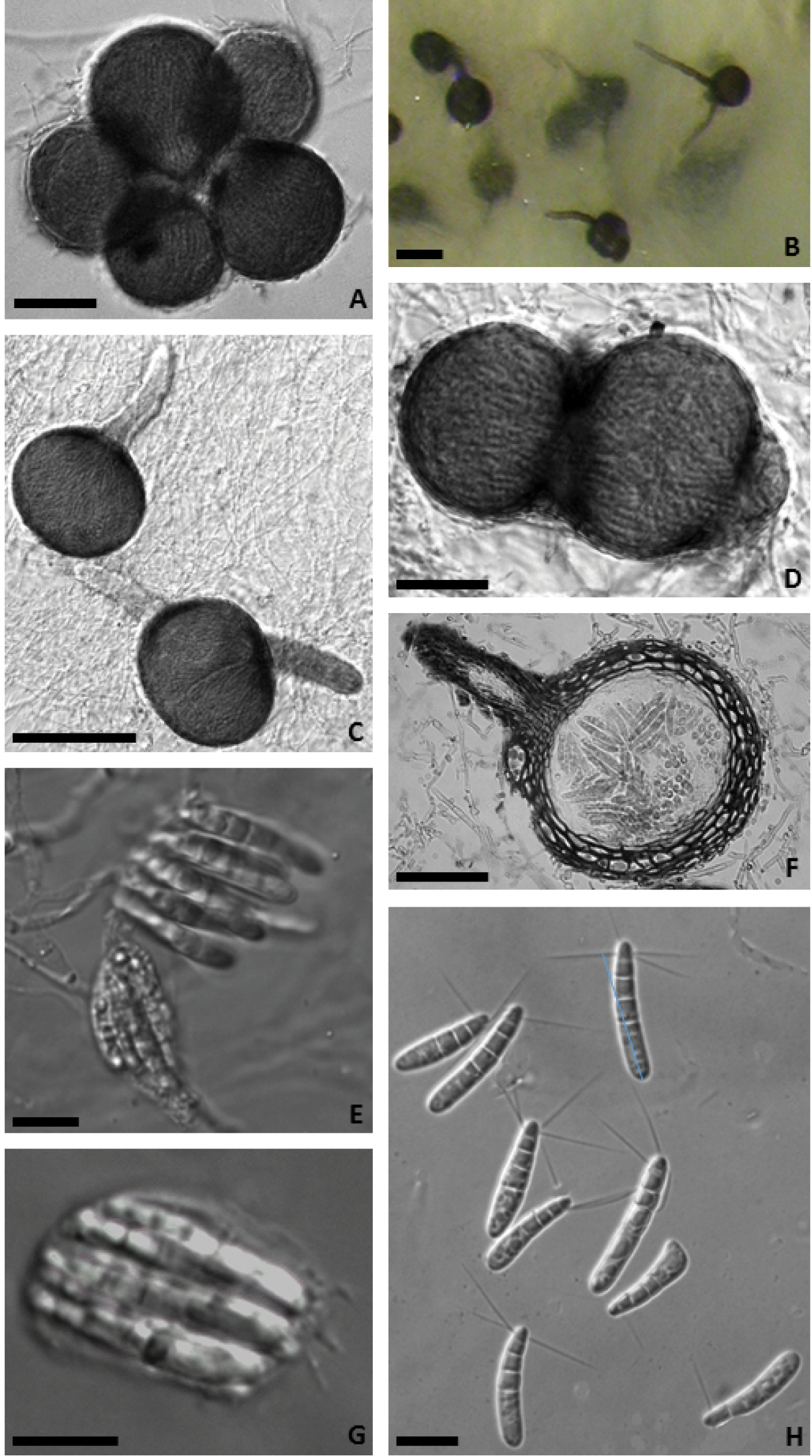
- Elbamycella rosea gen. et sp. nov. (Juncigenaceae, Torpedosporales)

Scientific classification
- Kingdom: Fungi
- Division: Ascomycota
- Class: Sordariomycetes
- Subclass: Hypocreomycetidae
- Order: Torpedosporales; E.B.G. Jones, Abdel-Wahab & K.L. Pang

Families
- (with number of genera): Etheirophoraceae (2); Juncigenaceae (6); Torpedosporaceae (1)

= Torpedosporales =

Order of fungi

The Torpedosporales are an order of marine based fungi in the class Sordariomycetes, subclass Hypocreomycetidae. Most are found on wood substrates in the water.

== History ==
In an attempt to clarify the phylogeny of the genera, Swampomyces Kohlm. & Volkm.-Kohlm. and Torpedospora Meyers, Sakayaroj et al. (2005) recognised a distinct lineage of marine Ascomycota within the class Sordariomycetes, that was then named TBM (Torpedospora/Bertia/Melanospora) clade (Schoch et al. 2007). Following a re-evaluation of the marine fungi affiliated to the TBM clade, together with the terrestrial genus Falcocladium, new families were introduced to accommodate its four subclades: Juncigenaceae, Etheirophoraceae, Falcocladiaceae, and Torpedosporaceae, which all formerly belonged to the order Torpedosporales (Jones et al. 2014; Abdel-Wahab et al. 2018). Based on phylogeny and morphological data, Maharachchikumbura et al. in 2015 introduced the order Falcocladiales (with family Falcocladiaceae) under the class Sordariomycetes. This was accepted by Wijayawardene et al. 2020, and Wijayawardene et al. 2022.

The families Etheirophoraceae Rungjindamati, Somrothipol, & Suetrong, Cryptog. Mycol. 35(2): 134 (2014), Juncigenaceae E.B.G. Jones, Abdel-Wahab & K.L. Pang, Cryptog. Mycol. 35(2): 133 (2014) and Torpedosporaceae E.B.G. Jones & K.L. Pang, Cryptog. Mycol. 35(2): 135 (2014) form well-separated clades within Torpedosporales in the phylogram generated from combined LSU, SSU and rpb2 sequence data. This observation was supported by previous studies of Jones et al. in 2015, and also by Maharachchkumbura et al. in 2016. The divergence time for Torpedosporales is estimated as 185 Mya (million years ago). There are three families and ten genera in this order.

== Description ==
Generally, the conidia of Torpedosporales are solitary and helicoid e.g. Juncigenaceae has single, brown, helicoid shaped conidia. While the conidia of Torpedosporaceae are solitary, irregularly helicoid and muriform (meaning resembling courses of bricks or stones in squareness and regular arrangement).(Hyde et al. 2020a).

== Distribution ==
It has a scattered cosmopolitan distribution within various marine environments. This includes the Mediterranean Sea. the Arabian Sea, New Zealand, and near Australia.
