= Retrostium =

Scientific classification
- Kingdom: Fungi
- Division: Ascomycota
- Class: Sordariomycetes
- Order: Spathulosporales
- Family: Spathulosporaceae
- Genus: Retrostium; Nakagiri & Tad.Ito (1997)

Type species
- Retrostium amphiroae Nakagiri & Tad.Ito (1997)

Genus of fungi

Retrostium is a fungal genus in the division Ascomycota. This is a monotypic genus, containing the single species Retrostium amphiroae, described as new to science from Japan in 1997. Species Fungorum places it within the family Spathulosporaceae, which would place it with the Spathulosporales Order.
