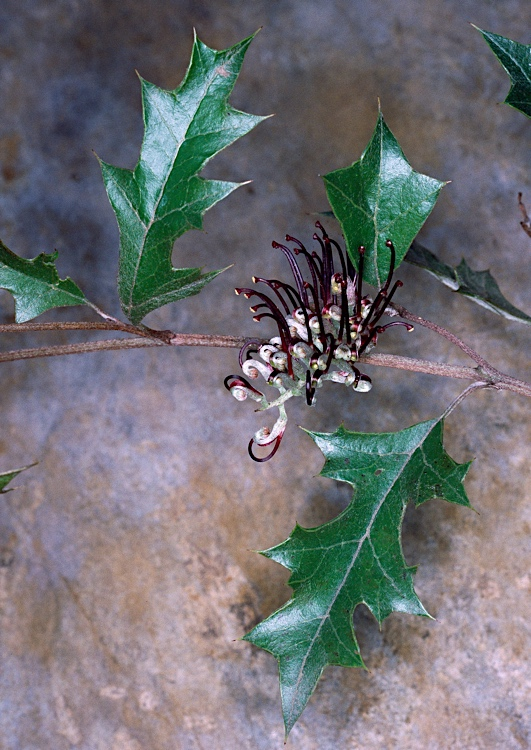
- Subspecies scortechinii

Conservation status
- Critically Endangered (IUCN 3.1)

Scientific classification
- Kingdom: Plantae
- Clade: Embryophytes
- Clade: Tracheophytes
- Clade: Angiosperms
- Clade: Eudicots
- Order: Proteales
- Family: Proteaceae
- Genus: Grevillea
- Species: G. scortechinii

Binomial name
- Grevillea scortechinii (F.Muell. ex Scort.) F.Muell.

Subspecies
- subsp. scortechinii; subsp. sarmentosa

Synonyms
- Grevillea ilicifolia var. scortechinii

= Grevillea scortechinii =

Species of shrub endemic to Australia

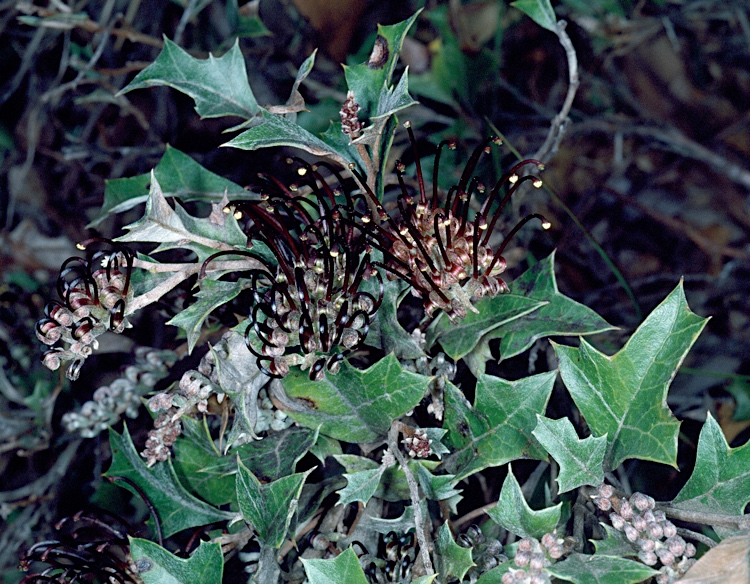
Subspecies sarmentosa in the ANBG

Grevillea scortechinii (/skɔːrtɛtʃiːniːaɪ/) is a species of flowering plant in the family Proteaceae and is endemic to eastern Australia. It is a prostrate to sprawling shrub with serrated to pinnatifid leaves, the end lobes broadly triangular and often sharply-pointed, and clusters of brown flowers with a dark purplish-black style. There are two geographically isolated subspecies; subsp. scortechinii, known as black grevillea found in Queensland and subsp. sarmentosa, known as Backwater grevillea and found in New South Wales.

== Description ==
Grevillea scortechinii is a prostrate to sprawling shrub that typically grows up to 0.8 m (2 ft 7 in) high and 1.2 m (3 ft 11 in) wide. Its leaves are egg-shaped to oblong in outline, 30–110 mm (1.2–4.3 in) long and 20–60 mm (0.79–2.36 in) wide but serrated to pinnatifid with 3 to 14 lobes or broad teeth that are sometimes further divided, the end lobes rounded, to broadly triangular and up to 20 mm (0.79 in) long and sometimes sharply pointed. The lower surface of the leaves is silky-hairy. The flowers are borne on one side of a rachis 20–45 mm (0.79–1.77 in) long and brown, the style purplish black with a green pollen presenter. The flower stalk is 1.0–1.6 mm (0.039–0.063 in) long and the pistil 19–22 mm (0.75–0.87 in) long. Flowering time varies with subspecies and the fruit is a silky-hairy follicle 8.5–12 mm (0.33–0.47 in) long.

== Taxonomy ==
This grevillea was first formally described in 1883 by Benedetto Scortechini in the Proceedings of the Linnean Society of New South Wales from an unpublished description by Ferdinand von Mueller who gave it the name Grevillea ilicifolia var. scortechinii. In 1889, von Mueller raised the variety to species status as G. scortechinii in the Second Systematic Census of Australian Plants. The species name scortechinii honours Scortechini who discovered the species and collected the type specimen.

In 1989, Donald McGillivray described two subspecies of G. scortechinii and the names are accepted by the Australian Plant Census:

- Grevillea scortechinii subsp. sarmentosa (Blakely & McKie) McGill., (previously known as G. sarmentosa) has leaf lobes that are often further divided, and lack conspicuous veins on the upper surface, the pistil 19–22 mm (0.75–0.87 in) long and the flower stalk 1.0–1.6 mm (0.039–0.063 in) long. Flowering occurs from February to March.
- Grevillea scortechinii (F.Muell. ex Scort.) F.Muell. subsp. scortechinii, has leaf lobes that are usually not further divided, and have conspicuous veins on the upper surface, the pistil 28–30 mm (1.1–1.2 in) long and the flower stalk 2.0–2.6 mm (0.079–0.102 in) long. Flowering occurs in October and November.

== Distribution and habitat ==
Grevillea scortechinii grows in woodland often on granite or in remnant roadside vegetation. Subspecies sarmentosa occurs near Guyra in New South Wales and subsp. scortechinii between Stanthorpe and Cottonvale in Queensland.

== Conservation status ==
Grevillea scortechinii is listed as 'Critically Endangered' on the IUCN Red List of Threatened Species. A significant percentage (at least 80%) of the species' population has declined over the previous 45 years since the IUCN's assessment in 2019, primarily due to habitat destruction through agricultural development and the invasion of weeds.

Subspecies sarmentosa is listed as 'Vulnerable' under the New South Wales Government Biodiversity Conservation Act. Although populations are fragmented, they are recorded as being locally abundant with possibly as many as 20,000 plants being recorded in the Warra National Park and Wattleridge Indigenous Protected Area.

Subspecies scortechinii is the more threatened of the two subspecies, being listed as 'Critically Endangered' under the Australian Government Environment Protection and Biodiversity Conservation Act 1999. Its population is small and fragmented with an area of occupation (AOO) of 20 km^{2} (7.7 sq mi) and a population of 1446 mature individuals counted in 2019.

== Use in horticulture ==
Although uncommon, this species is cultivated in gardens across Australia as an ornamental plant for its unusual black flowers which are sought after by grevillea collectors. Subspecies scortechinii is hardy and long-lived plant tolerant of light frost and extended dry periods as well as summer humidity. It grows best in dry climates and in acidic, sandy, well-drained soil in a full sun or partly shaded position. Specimens have been successfully grown and flowered in gardens as far south as Melbourne and as far north as Brisbane.

Subspecies sarmentosa is the more hardy and adaptable of the two subspecies, having been successfully cultivated in a wider climatic range and in a greater variety of soil types, although an acidic to neutral loam is preferred. Like subsp. scortechinii, it grows best in well-drained soil in a sunny or partly shady position. Plants have been grown in the Australian National Botanic Gardens in Canberra, Burrendong Arboretum near Wellington in N.S.W. and in Joseph Banks Native Plants Reserve in Sydney.
