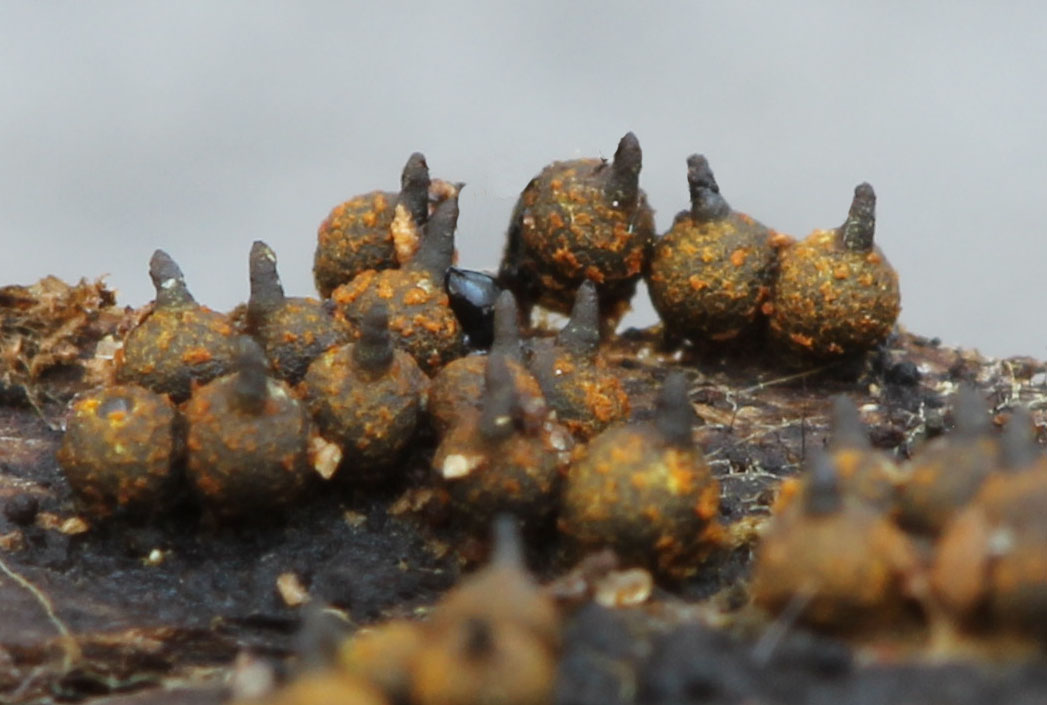
- Jobellisia luteola

Scientific classification
- Kingdom: Fungi
- Division: Ascomycota
- Class: Sordariomycetes
- Subclass: Hypocreomycetidae
- Order: Jobellisiales
- Family: Jobellisiaceae; Réblová (2008)
- Genus: Jobellisia; M.E.Barr (1993)

Type species
- Jobellisia luteola (Ellis & Everh.) M.E.Barr (1993)

= Jobellisia =

Genus of fungi

Jobellisia is a genus of fungi within the monotypic family Jobellisiaceae and the monotypic order Jobellisiales and also the subclass Hypocreomycetidae, and class Sordariomycetes. The genus was circumscribed by Margaret Elizabeth Barr-Bigelow in 1993 with Jobellisia luteola as the type species. It contains species that grow on dead wood and bark in tropical and temperate regions of the Northern Hemisphere.

== History ==
Barr originally classified Jobellisia in the family Clypeosphaeriaceae of the order Xylariales, with two new species Jobellisia luteola (the type species) and Jobellisia nicaraguensis. Later phylogenetic work showed that Jobellisia luteola and Jobellisia fraterna formed a clade that is sister to the order Diaporthales. In 2008, Martina Réblová erected a new genus, Bellojisia (an anagram of Jobellisia), to contain what was then called Jobellisia rhynchostoma, and created the family Jobiellaceae for the remaining Jobellisia species. Based on LSU sequence data, she demonstrated that Jobiellaceae occupies a basal position in a clade containing the Calosphaeriales and Diaporthales, in the Sordariomycetes incertae sedis.

Using phylogenetic analysis, Maharachchikumbura et al. (2015) introduced the new order of Jobellisiales to accommodate this family, which was also accepted by Maharachchikumbura et al. (in 2016b). With the use of molecular clock evidence, Jobellisiales fell in the ordinal time frame (146 MYA) (Hyde et al. 2017a). However, Hongsanan et al. (in 2017) stated that the placement of this order is unstable as sometimes it clustered with Pleurostomataceae. It was still accepted in 2022 by Wijayawardene et al.

Sequences of three species of Jobellisia are available in GenBank (Jobellisia fraterna, Jobellisia guangdongensis and Jobellisia luteola), and have been used in phylogenetic analyses (Maharachchikumbura et al. 2015, 2016b, Hongsanan et al. 2017,).

== Description ==
Sexual morph: Ascomata perithecial, basally immersed to superficial, astromatic, globose to subglobose, lageniform (shaped like a flask) to obpyriform (shape that is in outline like that of a pear), brown to black or yellowish, glabrous or slightly rugose, with a papilla or with upright neck. Peridium three-layered, comprising cells of textura angularis or textura prismatica or textura intricata, some with an orange, middle wall layer. Paraphyses numerous, septate. Asci 8-spored, unitunicate, cylindrical to clavate, short pedicellate, with a J−, distinct, refractive, apical ring. Ascospores uniseriate or overlapping uniseriate, oblong to ellipsoidal, fusoid to fusiform, straight or slightly curved, reddish-brown or greenish-brown to brown, darker at the median septum, 1-septate, with germ pores at one or both ends. Asexual morph: Undetermined (adapted from Réblová 2008 and Maharachchikumbura et al.).

== Distribution and habitats ==
It has a scattered distribution, found in America (within North, Central and South), parts of Europe, parts of Africa and parts of eastern Asia.

== Species ==
8 species have accepted by Species Fungorum and GBIF;

- Jobellisia barrii Huhndorf, Lodge & F.A. Fernández (1999)
- Jobellisia fraterna Huhndorf, Lodge & F.A. Fernández (1999)
- Jobellisia guangdongensis F. Liu & L. Cai (2012)
- Jobellisia luteola (Ellis & Everh.) M.E. Barr (1993)
- Jobellisia nicaraguensis (Ellis & Everh.) M.E. Barr (1993)
- Jobellisia peckii (Howe) Unter. & Réblová (2013)
- Jobellisia saliciluticola P. Leroy (2006)
- Jobellisia viridifusca C.K.M. Tsui & K.D. Hyde (2001)

Former species;

- J. rhynchostoma (Höhn.) M.E. Barr (1994) = Bellojisia rhynchostoma, Lasiosphaeriaceae
