= Tengiomyces =

Scientific classification
- Kingdom: Fungi
- Division: Ascomycota
- Class: Sordariomycetes
- Order: Coronophorales
- Family: incertae sedis
- Genus: Tengiomyces; Réblová
- Species: T. indicus

Binomial name
- Tengiomyces indicus (Varghese & V.G. Rao) Réblová

Genus of fungi

Tengiomyces is a genus of fungi in the Coronophorales order of the Ascomycota. The relationship of this taxon to other taxa within the Sordariomycetes class is unknown (incertae sedis), and it has not yet been placed with certainty into any family. This is a monotypic genus, containing the single species Tengiomyces indicus.
