= Albert Gaillard =

French mycologist (1858–1903)

Albert Gaillard (5 September 1858 in Neuilly-sur-Seine – 28 July 1903 in Angers) was a French mycologist.

From 1889 to 1903, he worked as curator of the Lloyd herbarium in Angers (later known as the "Arboretum de la Maulévrie Herbiers de la Ville d'Angers"). In 1887 he collected mycological and botanical specimens in Venezuela; mainly in the vicinity of Puerto Ayacucho and places along the Orinoco River, journeying as far as San Fernando de Atabapo. In Colombia, he collected specimens along the Rio Guaviare, a tributary of the Orinoco.

The French Academy of Sciences awarded the 1893 "Prix Montague" to Gaillard for his work on fungi.

The genus Gaillardiella (family Nitschkiaceae) was named in his honor by Narcisse Théophile Patouillard in 1895.

== Published works ==
- Champignons du Vénézuéla et principalement de la région du Haut-Orénoque, récoltés en 1887 par M.A. Gaillard. Bulletin de la Société Mycologique de France (1888–89) – Fungi of Venezuela, mainly from the region of the Upper Orinoco, collected in 1887 by A. Gaillard. (co-author: Narcisse Théophile Patouillard).
- Contribution à l'étude des champignons inférieurs: famille des Périspoiacées, le genre Meliola : anatomie, morphologie, systématique, (1892) – Contribution to the study of lower fungi, (genus Meliola : anatomy, morphology, systematics).
- Le genre Meliola. (part 1) Bulletin de la Société Mycologique de France 8: 76-[78]. (1892) – The genus Meliola.
- Le genre Meliola, (part 2) Bulletin de la Société Mycologique de France 8 (4): 176-188. (1892) – The genus Meliola.
- Note sur quelques espéces nouvelles du genre Asterina. Bulletin de la Société Mycologique de France 13: 179-181. (1897) – Note on some new species of the genus Asterina.
