= Gaillardiella =

Scientific classification
- Kingdom: Fungi
- Division: Ascomycota
- Class: Sordariomycetes
- Order: Coronophorales
- Family: Bertiaceae
- Genus: Gaillardiella; Pat. (1895)

Type species
- Gaillardiella pezizoides

Species
- Gaillardiella caryocana; Gaillardiella melioloides; Gaillardiella monninae; Gaillardiella pezizoides; Gaillardiella piptocarphae; Gaillardiella punctiformis

Genus of fungi

Gaillardiella is a genus of fungi within the Bertiaceae family. It has been found 3 times in Costa Rica in the early 2000s at elevations 50, 250, and 650 meters.

The genus name of Gaillardiella is in honour of Albert Gaillard (1858–1903), who was a French mycologist.

The genus was circumscribed by Narcisse Théophile Patouillard in Bull. Soc. Mycol. France Vol.11 on page 226 in 1895.
