= Melanosporales =

Scientific classification
- Kingdom: Fungi
- Division: Ascomycota
- Class: Sordariomycetes
- Subclass: Hypocreomycetidae
- Order: Melanosporales; N. Zhang & M. Blackw.

Families
- Ceratostomataceae

Order of fungi

The Melanosporales is a former order of fungi within the class Sordariomycetes.

It is now a synonym of order Coronophorales.
