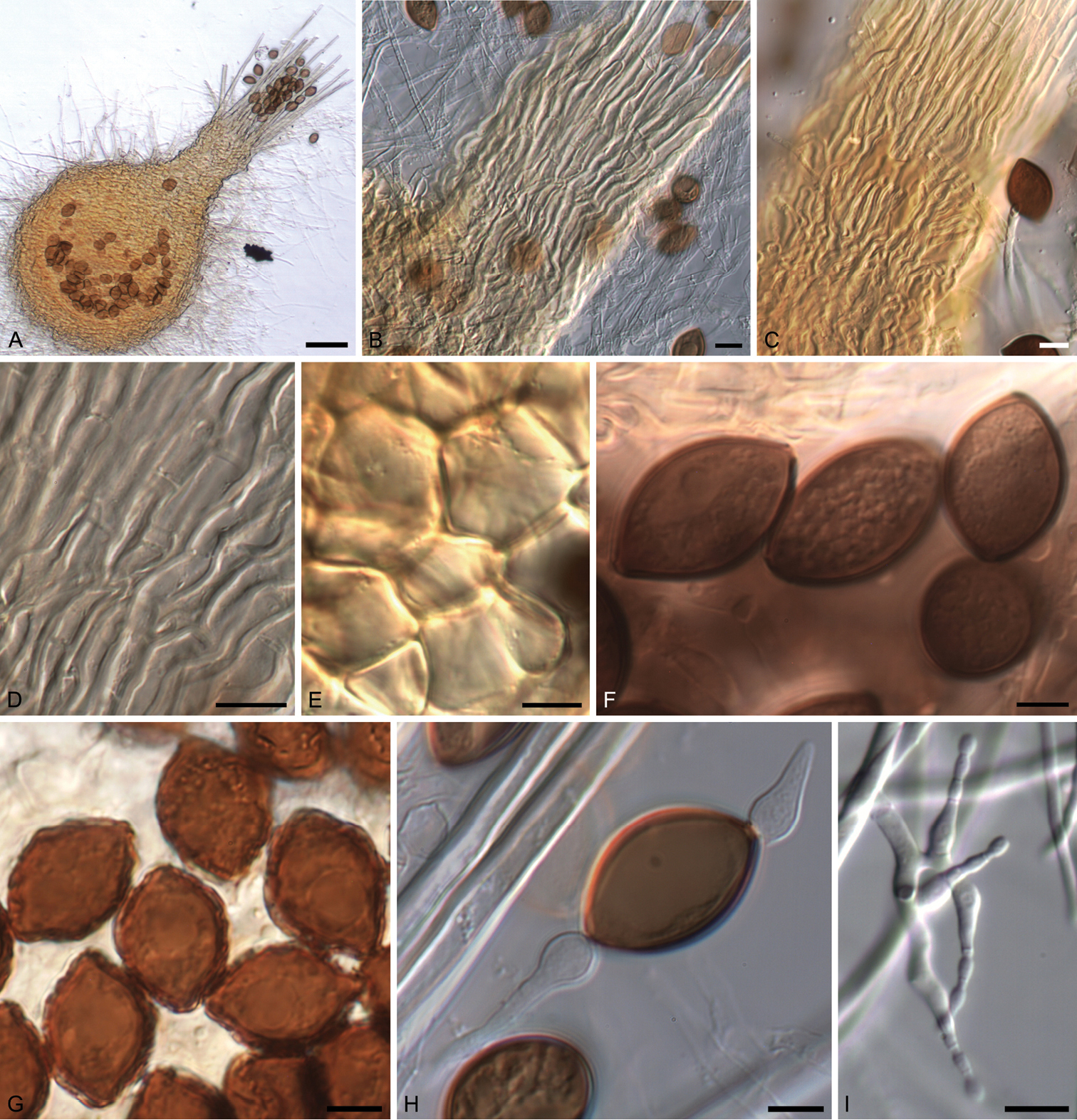
- Morphological features of the genus Melanospora. Melanospora damnosa (CBS 113681). A Ascoma B Ascomatal neck D Detail of hyphal neck F Ascospores H Ascospore germinating. Melanospora zamiae (NBRC 7902) C Ascomatal neck E Detail of ascomatal wall. Melanospora verrucispora (NBRC 31375T) G Ascospores I Phialidic asexual morph. Scale bars: 50 μm (A); 10 μm (B–E, I); 5 μm (F–H).

Scientific classification
- Domain: Eukaryota
- Kingdom: Fungi
- Division: Ascomycota
- Class: Sordariomycetes
- Order: Coronophorales
- Family: Ceratostomataceae
- Genus: Melanospora; Corda

Type species
- Melanospora zamiae Corda

= Melanospora =

Genus of fungi

Melanospora is a genus of fungi within the Ceratostomataceae family.

Sakayaroj et al. (2005) recognised a distinct lineage of marine Ascomycota within the class Sordariomycetes, that was then named TBM (Torpedospora/Bertia/Melanospora) clade. Bertia was later placed in order Coronophorales and Torpedospora in order Torpedosporales.

== Species ==
- Melanospora aculeata
- Melanospora affine
- Melanospora angulosa
- Melanospora anomala
- Melanospora antarctica
- Melanospora arachnophila
- Melanospora arenaria
- Melanospora argadis
- Melanospora asclepiadis
- Melanospora asparagi
- Melanospora asperrima
- Melanospora aurea
- Melanospora betae
- Melanospora brevirostrata
- Melanospora brevirostris
- Melanospora bromelifoliae
- Melanospora camelina
- Melanospora caprina
- Melanospora cervicula
- Melanospora chionea
- Melanospora chrysomella
- Melanospora coemansii
- Melanospora collipora
- Melanospora coprophila
- Melanospora curvicola
- Melanospora damnosa
- Melanospora endobiotica
- Melanospora epimyces
- Melanospora erythraea
- Melanospora exsola
- Melanospora fallax
- Melanospora fayodi
- Melanospora fimbriata
- Melanospora fusispora
- Melanospora gibelliana
- Melanospora globosa
- Melanospora helleri
- Melanospora hypomyces
- Melanospora interna
- Melanospora karstenii
- Melanospora kurssanoviana
- Melanospora lagenaria
- Melanospora leucotricha
- Melanospora linkii
- Melanospora longisetosa
- Melanospora lucifuga
- Melanospora lunulata
- Melanospora macrospora
- Melanospora manginii
- Melanospora marchaliana
- Melanospora marchicum
- Melanospora mattiroloana
- Melanospora nectrioides
- Melanospora octahedrica
- Melanospora otagensis
- Melanospora pampeana
- Melanospora papillata
- Melanospora pascuensis
- Melanospora pegleri
- Melanospora phaseoli
- Melanospora pinitorqua
- Melanospora poae
- Melanospora radicis-pini
- Melanospora rhizophila
- Melanospora rubi
- Melanospora schmidtii
- Melanospora setchellii
- Melanospora similis
- Melanospora singaporensis
- Melanospora solani
- Melanospora stysanophora
- Melanospora terrestris
- Melanospora tiffanyae
- Melanospora townei
- Melanospora tulasnei
- Melanospora verrucispora
- Melanospora vitrea
- Melanospora washingtonensis
- Melanospora wentii
- Melanospora zamiae
- Melanospora zobelii
