= Coronophoraceae =

Scientific classification
- Kingdom: Fungi
- Division: Ascomycota
- Class: Sordariomycetes
- Order: Coronophorales
- Family: Coronophoraceae; Höhn. (1907)

Type genus
- Coronophora Fuckel (1864)

Genera
- Coronophora; Cryptosphaerella

Family of fungi

The Coronophoraceae are a family of fungi in the Ascomycota, order Coronophorales. The family was described by Austrian mycologist Franz Xaver Rudolf von Höhnel in 1907.
