= Etheirophoraceae =

Scientific classification
- Kingdom: Fungi
- Division: Ascomycota
- Class: Sordariomycetes
- Order: Torpedosporales
- Family: Etheirophoraceae; Rungjindamati, Somrothipol, & Suetrong, Cryptogamie, Mycologie 35(2): 134 (2014)

Type genus
- Etheirophora Kohlm. & Volkm.-Kohlm.

Family of fungi

Etheirophoraceae is a family of ascomycetous marine based fungi within the order of Torpedosporales in the subclass Hypocreomycetidae and within the class Sordariomycetes. They are saprobic on intertidal wood and bark within marine habitats.

== Genera ==
It contains the following genera (with amount of species);

- Etheirophora with 3 species, (Etheirophora bijubata Kohlm. & Volkm.-Kohlm. (1989), Etheirophora blepharospora (Kohlm. & E. Kohlm.) Kohlm. & Volkm.-Kohlm. (1989), and Etheirophora unijubata Kohlm. & Volkm.-Kohlm. (1989)),
- Swampomyces with 2 species, (Swampomyces armeniacus Kohlm. & Volkm.-Kohlm. (1987), and Swampomyces triseptatus K.D. Hyde & Nakagiri (1992)),

Note former species;

- Swampomyces aegyptiacus Abdel-Wahab, El-Shar. & E.B.G. Jones (2001) = Fulvocentrum aegyptiacum, Juncigenaceae
- Swampomyces clavatisporus Abdel-Wahab, El-Shar. & E.B.G. Jones (2001) = Fulvocentrum clavatisporum, Juncigenaceae

== History ==
In 1987, Kohlmeyer & Volkmann-Kohlmeyer established the genus Swampomyces to accommodate Swampomyces armeniacus that is characterized by clypeate ascomata, apricot centrum, cylindrical asci and one-septate ascospores that are hyaline to yellowish, appearing light apricot-colored in mass. Another species, Swampomyces triseptatus K.D. Hyde & Nakagiri, was described from mangroves in Australia (Hyde & Nakagiri 1992). Then in 2001, Abdel-Wahab et al. described two new species of Swampomyces from Red Sea mangroves in Egypt, S. aegyptiacus and S. clavatisporus.

In 2007, Schoch et al. suggested that S. aegyptiacus and S. clavatisporus possibly belonged to a different genus Fulvocentrum. Schoch also agreed that Swampomyces and Etheirophora were in the same clade. This was agreed in further studies. Genus Etheirophora had been placed in family Lophiostomataceae, before family Etheirophoraceae was published in 2014.

The family (in 2023) includes the genera Etheirophora (E. bijubata, E. blepharospora, E. unijubata) and Swampomyces (S. armeniacus and S. triseptatus) (Jones et al. 2014). However, the genera Etheirophora and Swampomyces are not congeneric (belonging to the same genus) and they form a sister clade with Falcocladium species (Falcocladiaceae family, Falcocladiales order) in an unsupported clade in Hypocreomycetidae, order incertae sedis (Maharachchikumbura et al. (2015). Subsequently, Jones et al. in 2015, introduced order Torpedosporales to accommodate the families Etheirophoraceae, Juncigenaceae and Torpedosporaceae. The order evolved with a stem age of 171–241 MYA (Hongsanan et al. 2017, Hyde et al. 2017a).

They are ecological and economic significant as shown as the host-specificity of Keissleriella blephorospora = Etheirophora blepharospora, occurring on Rhizophora species (of Mangrove trees) in Hawaii has been reported and the species is involved in nutrient cycling (Osorio et al. 2016).

== Description ==
Fungal members of Etheirophoraceae have a sexual morph that has an ascomata (fruiting body) that is subglobose to globose or pyriform (pear-like), in shape and light brown to dark brown or black in colour. It is immersed (underwater), oblique or vertical to the host surface, clypeate (covered with a shield-like growth), coriaceous (leather-like, stiff but flexible), ostiolate (having an ostiole, a small hole or opening), periphysate (having short, thread-like filaments that line the opening) and papillate (covered with papillae, small growths). The peridium is composed of several layers of brown to dark brown cell layers of 'textura angularis' (a parenchyma-like tissue of very densely packed cells that appear angular in cross section). The paraphyses (supporting structures) are numerous, mostly unbranched and attached to the apex of the ascomatal cavity. They are embedded in a gelatinous matrix. They have an asci that is 8- spored, unitunicate ('single-walled'), cylindrical to oblong in shape, pedicellate (having a small stalk used to support other structures), J− and persistent. The ascospores are 1–2-seriate (arranged in rows), hyaline (transparent, glass-like) and ellipsoidal in shape. They have 1 to many septate (partitions), constricted at the septa, with a filamentous appendage at one or both ends. The appendages are bristle-like, origin undetermined. The asexual morph is yet undetermined (adapted from Jones et al. 2014).

== Distribution ==
It has a scattered marine distribution, within the Pacific and Atlantic Oceans, the Red Sea, Indian Ocean and the Baltic Sea. They have also been found near Australia, near Belize. in the Gulf of Mexico, near South Africa, near India, and in the South China Sea, near Hong Kong.

For example, Etheirophora bijubata was found on intertidal wood in the Pacific Ocean (near Kauai, Hawaii). Etheirophora blepharospora, Etheirophora bijubata and Etheirophora unijubata have all been found near the Hawaiian Islands (of Hawaii, Kauai, Maui and Oahu). Also Etheirophora bijubata and Etheirophora blepharospora have been found in intertidal mangrove forests within Thailand. Also Etheirophora blepharospora has been found with other fungi such as Capillataspora corticola, Caryosporella rhizophorae, Hydrophloeda rhizospora and Rhizophila marina on Rhizophora (Mangroves) in Hong Kong and the South China Sea.
