= Torpedosporaceae =

Scientific classification
- Kingdom: Fungi
- Division: Ascomycota
- Class: Sordariomycetes
- Order: Torpedosporales
- Family: Torpedosporaceae; E.B.G. Jones & K.L. Pang, Cryptogamie, Mycologie 35(2): 135 (2014)

Type genus
- Torpedospora Meyers

Family of fungi

Torpedosporaceae is a monotypic family of ascomycetous marine based fungi within the order of Torpedosporales in the subclass Hypocreomycetidae and within the class Sordariomycetes. They are saprobic on intertidal mangrove wood and roots, bark leaves, and sand in various marine habitats.

== Genera ==
The Torpedosporaceae family only contains the one genus, Torpedospora (with the following 3 species);

- Torpedospora ambispinosa Kohlm. (1960)
- Torpedospora mangrovei (Abdel-Wahab & Nagah.) E.B.G. Jones & Abdel-Wahab (2016)
- Torpedospora radiata Meyers (1957)

Note, former genus and species Glomerulispora mangrovei Abdel-Wahab & Nagah. (2010) = Torpedospora mangrovei

In 2022, Torpedospora yanbuensis was published, but as of September 2023, it had not yet been generally accepted.

== History ==
In an attempt to clarify the phylogeny of the genera Swampomyces Kohlm. & Volkm.-Kohlm. and Torpedospora Meyers, Sakayaroj et al. (2005) recognised a distinct lineage of marine Ascomycota within the class Sordariomycetes, that was then named TBM (Torpedospora/Bertia/Melanospora) clade (Schoch et al. 2007). Following a re-evaluation of the marine fungi affiliated to the TBM clade, together with the terrestrial genus of Falcocladium, new families were introduced to accommodate its four subclades: Juncigenaceae, Etheirophoraceae, Falcocladiaceae, and Torpedosporaceae, which all belonging to the order Torpedosporales (Jones et al. 2014; Abdel-Wahab et al. 2018). Then based on a study of phylogeny and morphological data, Maharachchikumbura et al. (2015) then introduced the order Falcocladiales (Falcocladiaceae) under the class Sordariomycetes.

The family of Torpedosporaceae was introduced with two Torpedospora species and Glomerulispora mangrovis (an asexual morph), based on molecular analysis of partial sequences of the nuclear SSU and LSU ribosomal DNA (Jones et al. 2014). Hence, the family then comprised two genera: Torpedospora and Glomerulispora (Jones et al. 2014). However, Glomerulispora mangrovei, was later grouped with the two Torpedospora species such that these generic names are considered synonyms (Abdel-Wahab et al. 2010, Jones et al. 2015). Based on the widespread utility of Torpedospora and its priority, the use of Torpedospora over Glomerulispora was recommended by Réblová et al. (2016). The family groups were placed in the Hypocreomycetidae subclass, in order incertae sedis (Jones et al. 2014, Maharachchikumbura et al. 2015b). Subsequently, Jones et al. (2015) had referred the family to a new order of Torpedosporales, and this was followed by Maharachchikumbura et al. (2016b) and Wijayawardene et al. (2018a).

== Description ==
Members within the family of Torpedosporaceae generally have a sexual morph, which has a perithecial (flask shaped structured) ascomata, which is hyaline (glass-like), immersed or superficial. They are subglobose (in shape), ostiolate (having an ostiole, a small hole or opening), papillate (covered in small hairs), subcarbonaceous to coriaceous (leather-like). They have a narrow paraphyses (filament-like support structure), which is irregular, persistent or early deliquescing (dissolving into a liquid state). They have an 8-spored asci, which is unitunicate (single-walled), thin-walled, clavate (club-shaped) to ellipsoidal, short pedicellate (small stemmed) and lacking an apical ring. They also have an early deliquescing. The ascospores are fasciculate (bundled), hyaline, cylindrical to ellipsoidal (in shape). They are 3–5-septate (divided into sections), with several radiating appendages at one or both ends. They also have a sexual morph, which is hyphomycetous (they produce conidia on hyphae). Th hyphae are septate, branched and hyaline. The conidiophores are present or obsolete, cylindrical (in form), clavate, septate or aseptate, acrogenous (increasing by growth from the extremity) or laterally on the hyphae. They are also hyaline to light brown in shade. The conidia are holoblastic (they divide into smaller cells) and are irregularly helicoid (spiral shaped), muriform (chambered), with the cells of the conidia tightly fused and more or less similar in size and colour. The conidia are also acrogenous, solitary, constricted at the septa and yellow to brown (in colour). They can also have up to 50 conidial cells.

== Distribution ==
It has a scattered, marine based cosmopolitan distribution. Including places such as the Red Sea, near Singapore, and near Malaysia.

For example, species Torpedospora radiata has been recorded as found in (or near) Australia, Bahamas, Belize, Brazil, Brunei, Egypt, France, Galapagos, Hong Kong, India, Indonesia, Italy, Ivory Coast, Japan, Kuwait, Liberia, Malaysia, Martinique, Mexico, New Zealand, Norway, Philippines, Portugal, Republic of Trinidad and Tobago, Samoa, Saudi Arabia, Seychelles, Sierra Leone, the Society Islands, Sri Lanka, Spain, Taiwan, Thailand, USA and Wales.

== Habitat ==
Torpedospora radiata generally occurs on decorticated wood (with removed bark). It has also been found on dead mangrove wood, sand, seagrasses, dead leaves, dead bamboo and driftwood. Although, it has rarely been reported in the colonization of submerged wood in the sea (Tan et al. 1989; Alias and Jones 2000).
