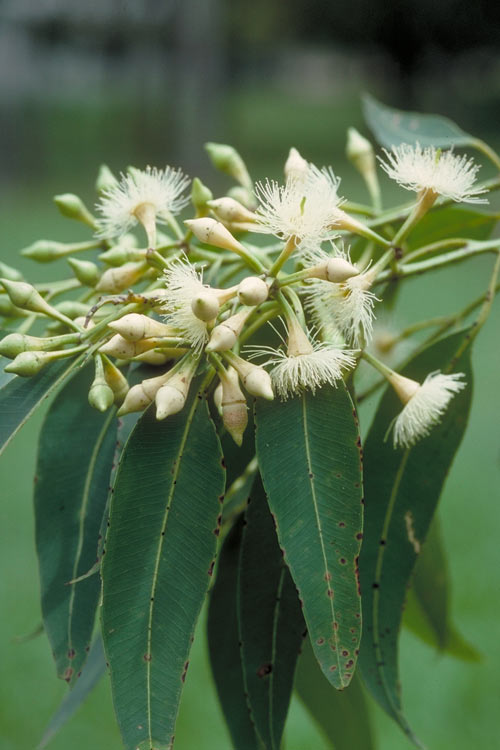
- Flowers and buds of Eucalyptus pellita

Scientific classification
- Kingdom: Plantae
- Clade: Embryophytes
- Clade: Tracheophytes
- Clade: Spermatophytes
- Clade: Angiosperms
- Clade: Eudicots
- Clade: Rosids
- Order: Myrtales
- Family: Myrtaceae
- Genus: Eucalyptus
- Species: E. pellita

Binomial name
- Eucalyptus pellita F.Muell.

Synonyms
- Eucalyptus biterranea L.A.S.Johnson & K.D.Hill; Eucalyptus resinifera var. pellita (F.Muell.) F.M.Bailey; Eucalyptus resinifera var. spectabilis (F.Muell.) F.M.Bailey; Eucalyptus spectabilis F.Muell.

= Eucalyptus pellita =

Large-fruited red mahogany

Species of eucalyptus

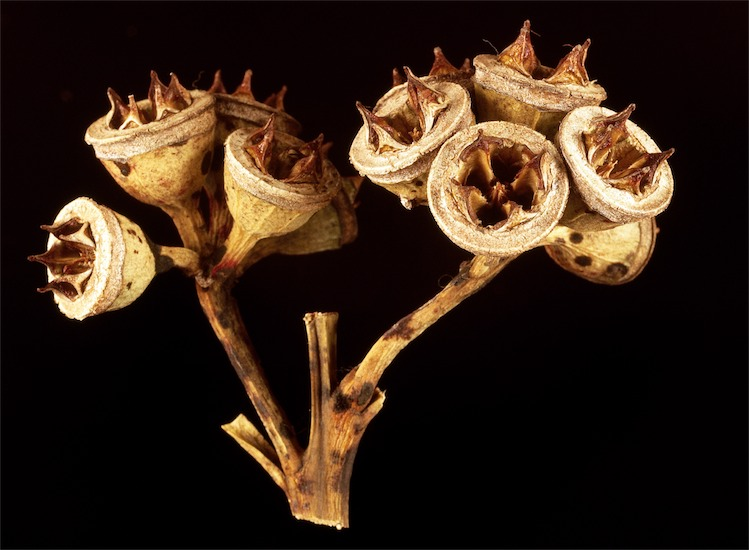
Fruit

Eucalyptus pellita, commonly known as the large-fruited red mahogany, is a species of medium to tall tree that is endemic to north-eastern Queensland. It has rough, fibrous or flaky bark on the trunk and branches, lance-shaped to egg-shaped adult leaves, flower buds in groups of seven, white flowers and cup-shaped to conical fruit.

== Description ==
Eucalyptus pellita is a tree that typically grows to a height of 40 m (130 ft) and forms a lignotuber. It has rough, greyish or reddish, fibrous or flaky bark on the trunk and branches. Adult leaves are glossy green but paler on the lower surface, broadly lance-shaped to egg-shaped, 100–230 mm (3.9–9.1 in) long, 30–65 mm (1.2–2.6 in) wide, tapering to a petiole 18–35 mm (0.71–1.38 in) long. The flower buds are arranged in leaf axils on a flattened, unbranched peduncle 12–32 mm (0.47–1.26 in) long, the individual buds on pedicels 6–7 mm (0.24–0.28 in) long. Mature buds are oval, 15–16 mm (0.59–0.63 in) long and 9–10 mm (0.35–0.39 in) wide with a conical or beaked operculum. Flowering has been recorded in February and October and the flowers are white. The fruit is a woody, cup-shaped to conical capsule 6–11 mm (0.24–0.43 in) long and 8–14 mm (0.31–0.55 in) wide with the valves protruding strongly above the rim.

== Taxonomy ==
Eucalyptus pellita was first formally described in 1864 by Victorian government botanist Ferdinand von Mueller in Fragmenta phytographiae Australiae, based on plant material collected near Rockingham Bay by John Dallachy. The specific epithet (pellita) is from Latin, meaning "covered with skin", possibly referring to the leaves.

== Distribution and habitat ==
Large-fruited red mahogany grows in open forest, mainly on gentle slopes. It is found in wet, near-coastal forests north from Abergowrie to Papua New Guinea.

== Conservation status ==
This eucalypt is listed as "least concern" under the Queensland Government Nature Conservation Act 1992.

== See also ==
- List of Eucalyptus species
