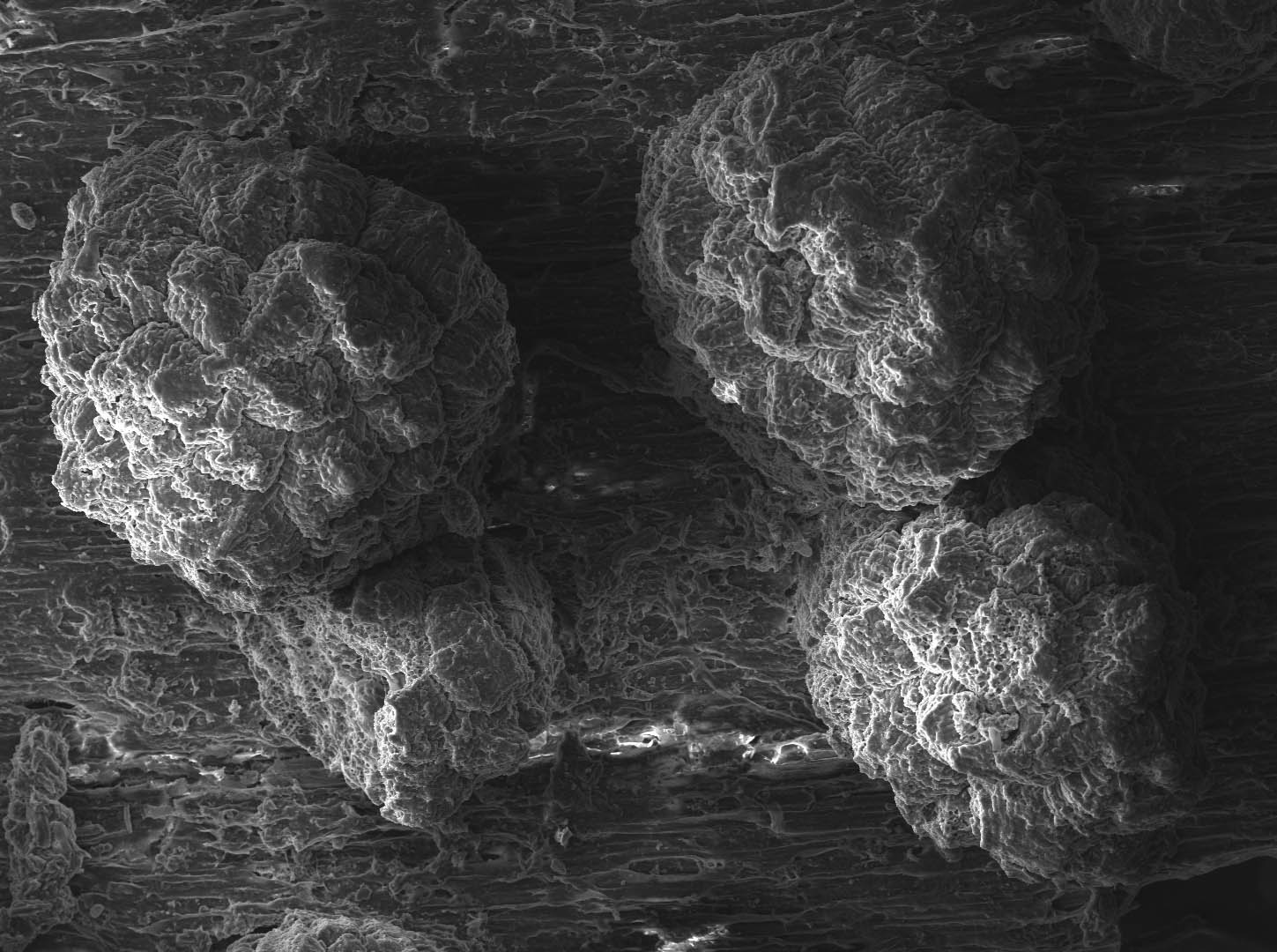
- Bertia latispora

Scientific classification
- Kingdom: Fungi
- Division: Ascomycota
- Class: Sordariomycetes
- Order: Coronophorales
- Family: Bertiaceae; Smyk (1981)

Type genus
- Bertia De Not. (1844)

Genera
- Bertia; Gaillardiella

= Bertiaceae =

Family of fungi

The Bertiaceae are a family of fungi in the Ascomycota, order Coronophorales.
