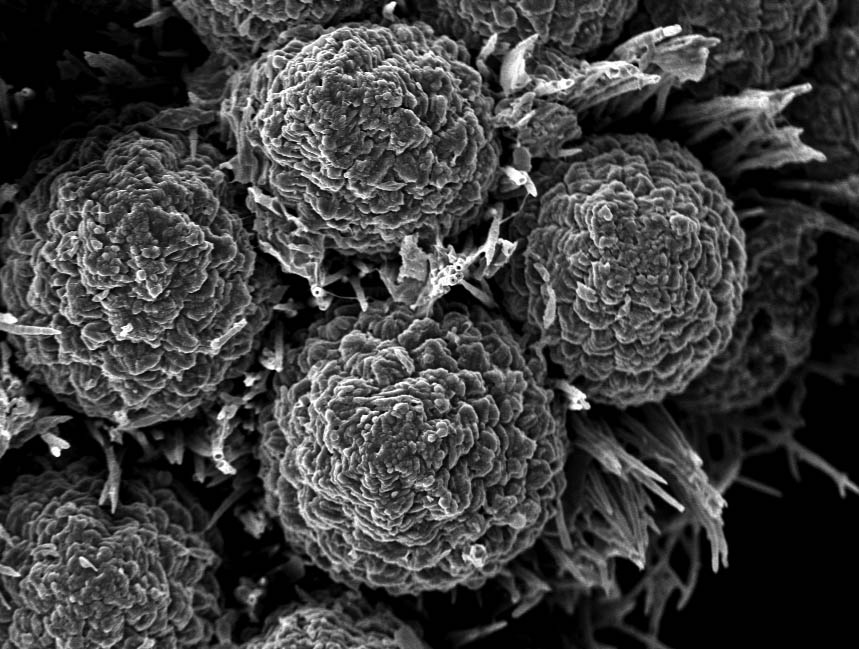
- Chaetosphaerella phaeostroma

Scientific classification
- Kingdom: Fungi
- Division: Ascomycota
- Class: Sordariomycetes
- Order: Coronophorales
- Family: Chaetosphaerellaceae; Huhndorf

Type genus
- Chaetosphaerella E.Müll. & C.Booth

= Chaetosphaerellaceae =

Family of fungi

The Chaetosphaerellaceae are a family of fungi in the Ascomycota, class Sordariomycetes. The family was described in 2004. Species in the family have a widespread distribution, and are found in both temperate and tropical areas, where they grow saprobically on fallen wood.

== Genera ==
As accepted by Wijayawardene et al. 2020;

- Chaetosphaerella E. Müll. & C. Booth (4)
- Crassochaeta Réblová (2)
- Spinulosphaeria Sivan. (2)
