= Benedetto Scortechini =

Italian botanist, explorer, and priest

- Born: 1845; Cupramontana, Papal States
- Died: 4 November 1886 (aged 40–41); Calcutta, India
- Scientific career
- Fields: Botany
- Author abbrev. (botany): Scort.

Benedetto Scortechini (1845–1886) was an Italian botanist, explorer, and Roman Catholic priest.

== Biography ==
He graduated from the Sapienza University of Rome as a priest and a lawyer. Accompanied by the priest Jerome Davadi (1846–1900) and one other Italian priest, Scortechini arrived in Brisbane on 28 February 1871. The three Italian priests were brought, shortly after the end of the First Vatican Council, to the Roman Catholic Archdiocese of Brisbane by Bishop James Quinn, the first Roman Catholic Bishop of Brisbane. After briefly working in Stanhope, Victoria and in Roma, Queensland, Scortechini was stationed in Gympie, Queensland from 1873 to 1875. In 1875 he was appointed the pastor of Logan Parish within the County of Ward, Queensland, where he remained the pastor for nine years until he left Australia in 1884.

In addition to his pastoral duties he spent much time studying the botany of the area, collecting specimens alongside the colonial botanist F.M. Bailey. About 90 specimens collected by Scortechini are found in the Queensland Herbarium ...

George King, Director of the Royal Botanic Garden Calcutta, arranged with Sir Hugh Low, the British Resident at Perak, to employ plant collectors to work in Peninsular Malaysia. As part of this programme, King and Low recruited Hermann H. Kunstler (1837–1887) and Scortechini. Botanical specimens were sent to George King in Calcutta with duplicates sent to Kew Gardens.

After leaving Australia early in 1884 Scortechini worked with fellow priest-scientist Rev. Julian Tenison-Woods documenting plant life in the Straits Settlements (Malaysia), where he was appointed Government Botanist at Perak. Leaving the region in 1886 he began making his way to London, via India, to publish his results. While in Calcutta, however, he began suffering from a fever, possibly malaria, and died in November.

Upon his death, Scortechini's collections were given to the Calcutta herbarium.

He published much of his research in the scientific journals of the day and was awarded membership of the Linnaean Society of New South Wales and later of the same Society in London. He was a foundation member of the Royal Society of Queensland.

== Eponyms ==
=== Genus ===
- (Nitschkiaceae, Fungi) Scortechinia Sacc. (1885)
- (Euphorbiaceae) Neoscortechinia Pax (1897)

=== Species ===
- (Acanthaceae) Filetia scortechinii C.B.Clarke
- (Annonaceae) Cyathocalyx scortechinii (King) J.Sinclair
- (Annonaceae) Goniothalamus scortechinii (King)
- (Annonaceae) Melodorum scortechinii (King) Finet & Gagnep.
- (Apocynaceae) Hoya scortechinii King & Gamble
- (Araliaceae) Schefflera scortechinii (King) R.Vig. synonym for Heptapleurum hullettii R. Vig
- (Arecaceae) Eleiodoxa scortechinii (Becc.) Burret synonym for Eleiodoxa conferta
- (Asclepiadaceae) Secamone scortechinii (King & Gamble) Klack.
- (Caesalpiniaceae) Caesalpinia scortechinii (F.Muell.) Hattink
- (Convolvulaceae) Argyreia scortechinii (Prain) Prain ex Hoogland
- (Gesneriaceae) Didymocarpus scortechinii (Ridl.) B.L.Burtt synonym of Henckelia scortechinii (Ridl.) A.Weber
- (Loranthaceae) Baratranthus scortechinii (Engl.) Tiegh. synonym of Baranthus axanthus Miq.
- (Rhamnaceae) Stenanthemum scortechinii (F.Muell.) Maiden & Betche synonym of Spyridium scortechinii
- (Proteaceae) Grevillea scortechinii (F.Muell. ex Scort.) F.Muell
- (Rubiaceae) Carinta scortechinii (King) Thoth. synonym of Geophila scortechinii
- (Theaceae) Ternstroemia scortechinii Szyszył.
- (Vitaceae) Tetrastigma scortechinii (King) Gagnep.

== Selected publications ==
- benedetto Scortechini. 1881. Scortechini, B. (1881). "Contribution to a South Queensland Flora". Proceedings of the Linnean Society of New South Wales. 6: 157–169. doi:10.5962/bhl.part.11864.
- benedetto Scortechini. 1885. "A new genus of Myrtaceae". Journal of Botany. 23: 153–154.
- pier Andrea Saccardo, giulio Paoletti, benedetto Scortechini. 1888. Mycetes Malacenses: funghi della penisola di Malacca raccolti nel 1885 dall'ab. Benedetto Scortechini. Editor Tip. Antonelli, 42 pp.
