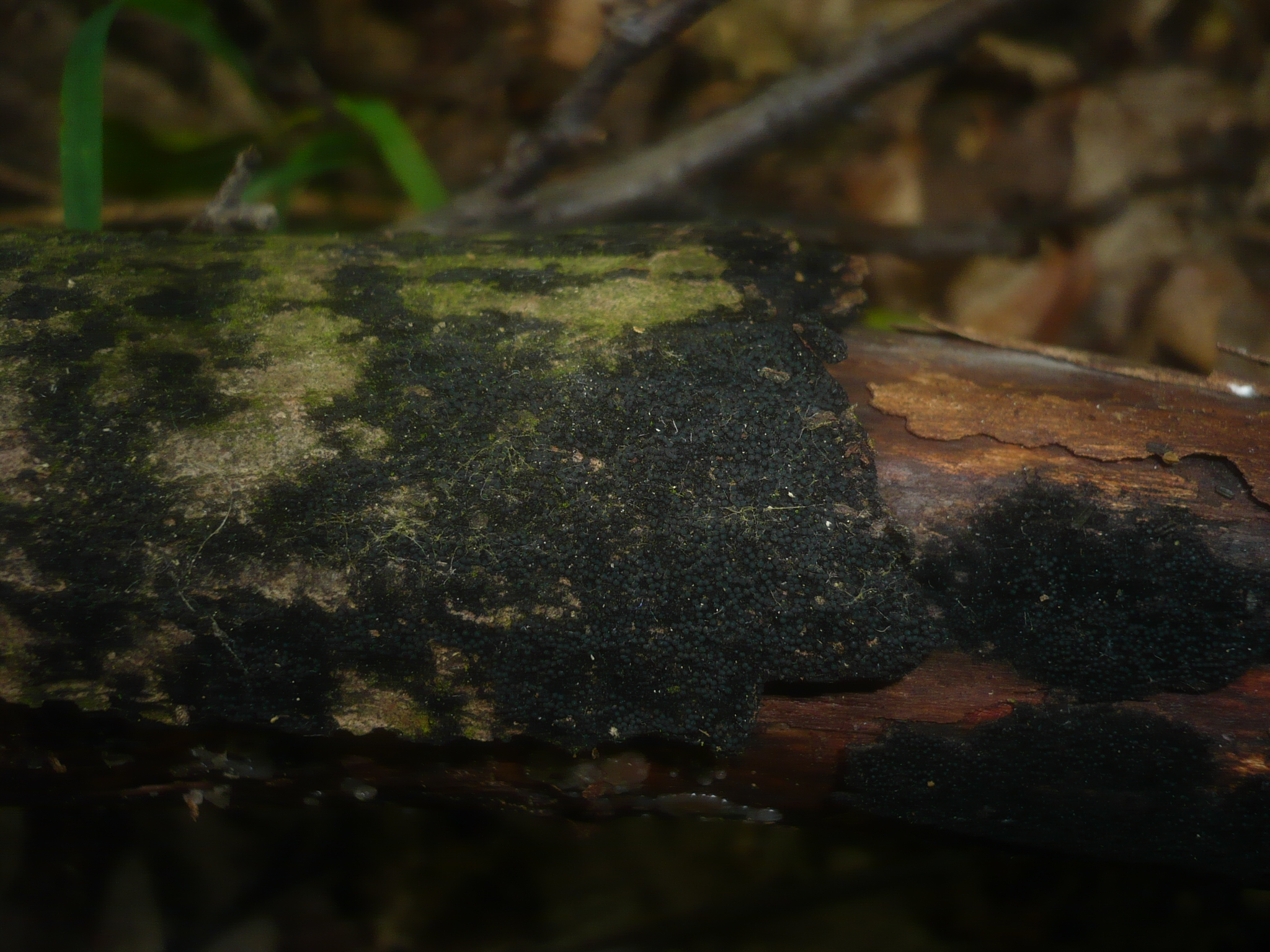
- Nitschkia grevillei

Scientific classification
- Kingdom: Fungi
- Division: Ascomycota
- Class: Sordariomycetes
- Order: Coronophorales
- Family: Nitschkiaceae; Nannf. (1932)

Type genus
- Nitschkia G.H.Otth ex P.Karst. (1873)

= Nitschkiaceae =

Family of fungi

The Nitschkiaceae are a family of fungi in the Ascomycota, order Coronophorales. Species in the family are mostly saprobic on wood, although some grow on lichens.

== Genera ==
This is a list of the genera in the Nitschkiaceae, based on a 2021 review and summary of fungal classification by Wijayawardene and colleagues. Following the genus name is the taxonomic authority (those who first circumscribed the genus; standardized author abbreviations are used), year of publication, and the number of species:

- Acanthonitschkea Speg. (1908) – 10 spp.
- Biciliosporina C.V.Subramanian & G.Sekar (1993) – 1 sp.
- Botryola A.C.Batista & J.L.Bezerra (1964) – 1 sp.
- Fracchiaea Sacc. (1873) – 35 spp.
- Groenhiella Jørg.Koch, E.B.G.Jones & S.T.Moss (1983) – 1 sp.
- Janannfeldtia C.V.Subramanian & G.Sekar (1993) – 1 sp.
- Lasiosphaeriopsis D.Hawksw. & Sivan. (1980) – 7 spp.
- Loranitschkia Lar.N.Vassiljeva (1990) – 1 sp.
- Neochaetosphaerella L.N.Vassiljeva, S.L.Stephenson & A.V.Chernyshev (2012) – 4 spp.
- Nitschkia G.H.Otth ex P.Karst. (1873) – 66 spp.
- Rhagadostoma Körb. (1865) – 7 spp.
- Rhagadostomella Etayo (2002) – 1 sp.
- Tortulomyces Lar.N.Vassiljeva, S.L.Stephenson, Chernyshev & K.D.Hyde (2013) – 1 sp.

Species Fungorum also lists Sydowinula moravica Petr. (1923) Nitschkiaceae.
