= Coronophorales =

Scientific classification
- Kingdom: Fungi
- Division: Ascomycota
- Class: Sordariomycetes
- Subclass: Hypocreomycetidae
- Order: Coronophorales; Nannf. (1932)

Families
- See text

Synonyms
- Melanosporales N.Zhang & M.Blackw., 2007

Order of fungi

The Coronophorales are an order of fungi in the class Sordariomycetes. According to a 2008 estimate, the order consisted of 4 families, 26 genera, and 87 species. This was changed in 2020, it then had 6 families, with 46 genera.

== Families ==
- Bertiaceae (2 genera)
- Ceratostomataceae (16)
- Chaetosphaerellaceae (3)
- Coronophoraceae (2)
- Nitschkiaceae (13)
- Scortechiniaceae (11)

=== Genera incertae sedis ===
As of 2020;

- Papulaspora Preuss (33 species)
- Sphaerodes Clem. (9)
- Tengiomyces Réblová (1)*
