= Romsilva =

- Company type: state-owned
- Industry: wood
- Founded: 1990
- Headquarters: Bucharest, Romania
- Area served: Romania
- Key people: Ion Codruț Bîlea (CEO)
- Revenue: ▲€ 250 million (2009)
- Operating income: € 7 million (2009)
- Number of employees: 22,900 (2009)
- Parent: Ministry of Agriculture and Rural Development
- Website: www.rosilva.ro

Regia Naţională a Pădurilor Romsilva or simply Romsilva is a Romanian state-owned enterprise responsible for dealing with protection, preservation and development of publicly owned forests of the Romanian state, and the management of hunting and fishing grounds. Romsilva owns and manages 4,000,000 hectares (9,900,000 acres) of forests which represents 65% of all forests in the country. The company has its headquarters in Bucharest.

== Activity ==
Romsilva owns and manages 4,000,000 hectares (9,900,000 acres) of forests or around 65% of Romania's 6,300,000 hectares (16,000,000 acres) overall forests. The forests consist mainly of common beech 31.5%, coniferous trees 29.9%, pedunculate oak 18%, different species of hardwood trees 15.7% and various types of softwood trees 4.9%. Other important assets include 214 lodges, of which 187 are introduced in the online accommodation system, and 69 are placed for national and international tourist circuits. The company produced around 25,000,000 cubic metres (880,000,000 cu ft) of timber and timber products in 2009 of which 90% was exported to Egypt and 10% to the People's Republic of China.

In 2009 Romsilva also harvested 6,750 metric tons of forest berries including vaccinium myrtillus, hippophae rhamnoides, rosa canina, vaccinium vitis-idaea, blackberry, crataegus monogyna and rubus idaeus, of which 3,100 metric tons were exported to Germany, Austria, France and the Netherlands. Romsilva is also an important fungus producer, having a total production of 25 metric tons of chanterelle, armillaria mellea, boletus edulis and morchella spongiola in 2009. The company also exported 2,650 rabbits and 3,000 pheasants mainly to Italy.

Romsilva publishes Revista pădurilor, the oldest journal published without interruption from Romania and one of the oldest forestry journals in the world.

== Controversy ==
According to Dimitrova & Buzogány (2014) "Romsilva was regarded as the main culprit behind the dramatic rise in illegal logging during the last decade, resulting in irreparable losses in forested territories. Its leadership has been accused of illegally contributing to campaign budgets of governing parties and of corrupt decisions in numerous local and national public procurement cases."

Corruption within Romsilva is rampant and employees who have spoken out against their corrupt superiors have been threatened and assaulted.
