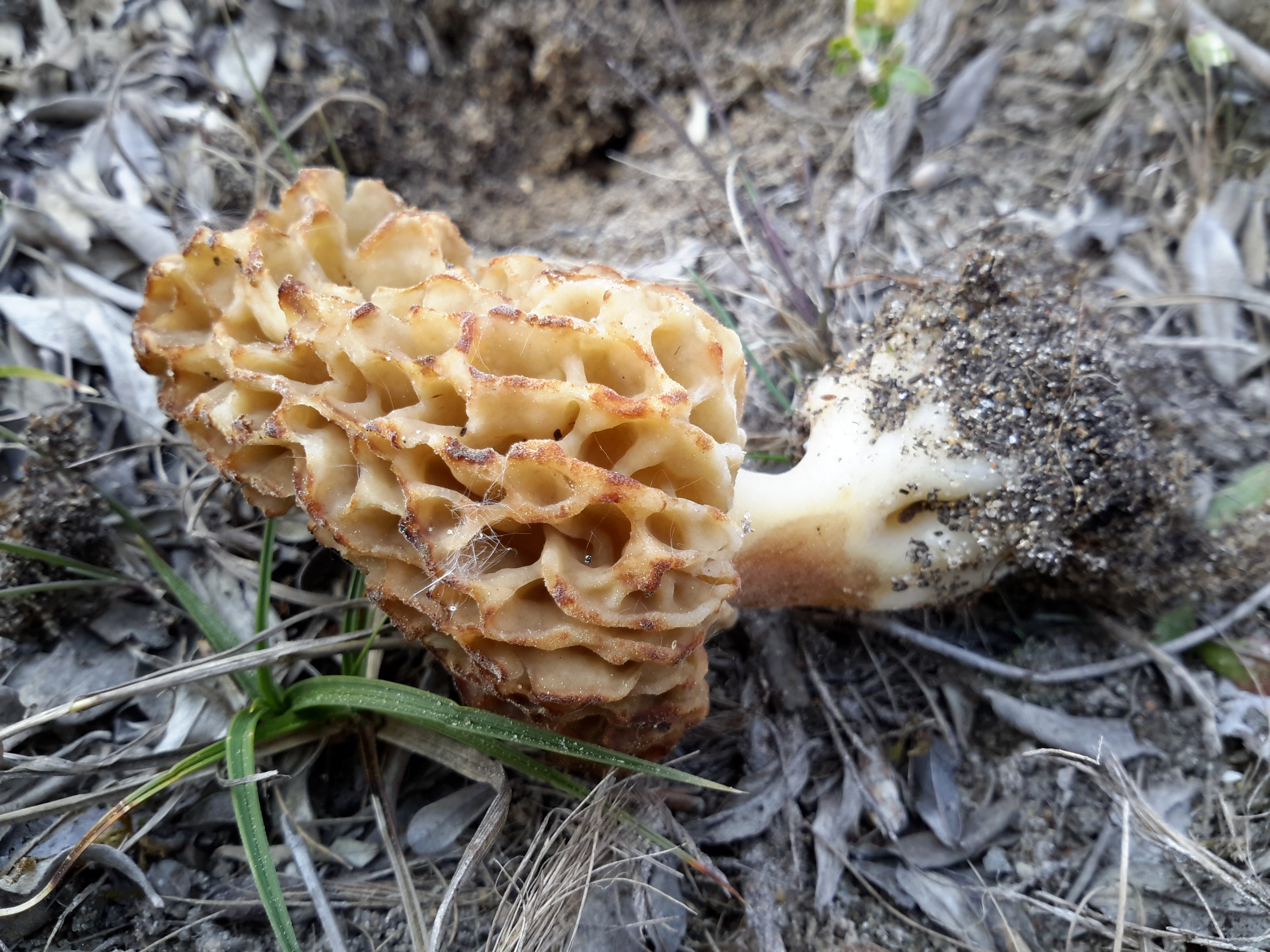
- Morchella dunensis found at Plouharnel

Scientific classification
- Domain: Eukaryota
- Kingdom: Fungi
- Division: Ascomycota
- Class: Pezizomycetes
- Order: Pezizales
- Family: Morchellaceae
- Genus: Morchella
- Species: M. dunensis

Binomial name
- Morchella dunensis (Castañera, J.L.Alonso, & G.Moreno) Clowez (1997)

Synonyms
- Morchella esculenta f. dunensis Castañera, J.L.Alonso & G.Moreno (1996); Morchella andalusiae Clowez & L. Romero (2012)

= Morchella dunensis =

Species of fungus

Morchella dunensis, the morel of the dunes, is a species of fungus in the family Morchellaceae (Ascomycota). It was first described as a form of Morchella esculenta by Castañera and colleagues in 1996, but was later recombined as a distinct species by Clowez. In a 2014 study by Richard and colleagues, the authors concluded that the taxon was conspecific to Morchella vulgaris, due to its close phylogenetic proximity to the latter. However, following increased molecular sampling and the testing of an isoparatype collection by Loizides and colleagues in 2016, it was revealed that M. dunensis is indeed very closely related to, but phylogenetically distinct from M. vulgaris. This study also showed that the taxon Morchella andalusiae is phylogenetically identical and therefore a later synonym of M. dunensis.

Morchella dunensis is notable for its xerophilic, Mediterranean ecology and distribution, often found on coastal dunes and bare, well-drained soil.
