= Morchella rigidoides =

Scientific classification
- Kingdom: Fungi
- Division: Ascomycota
- Class: Pezizomycetes
- Order: Pezizales
- Family: Morchellaceae
- Genus: Morchella
- Species: M. rigidoides

Binomial name
- Morchella rigidoides R.Heim (1966)

Species of fungus

Morchella rigidoides is a species of fungus in the family Morchellaceae. Described as new to science in 1966 by Roger Heim, it is found in Papua New Guinea.
