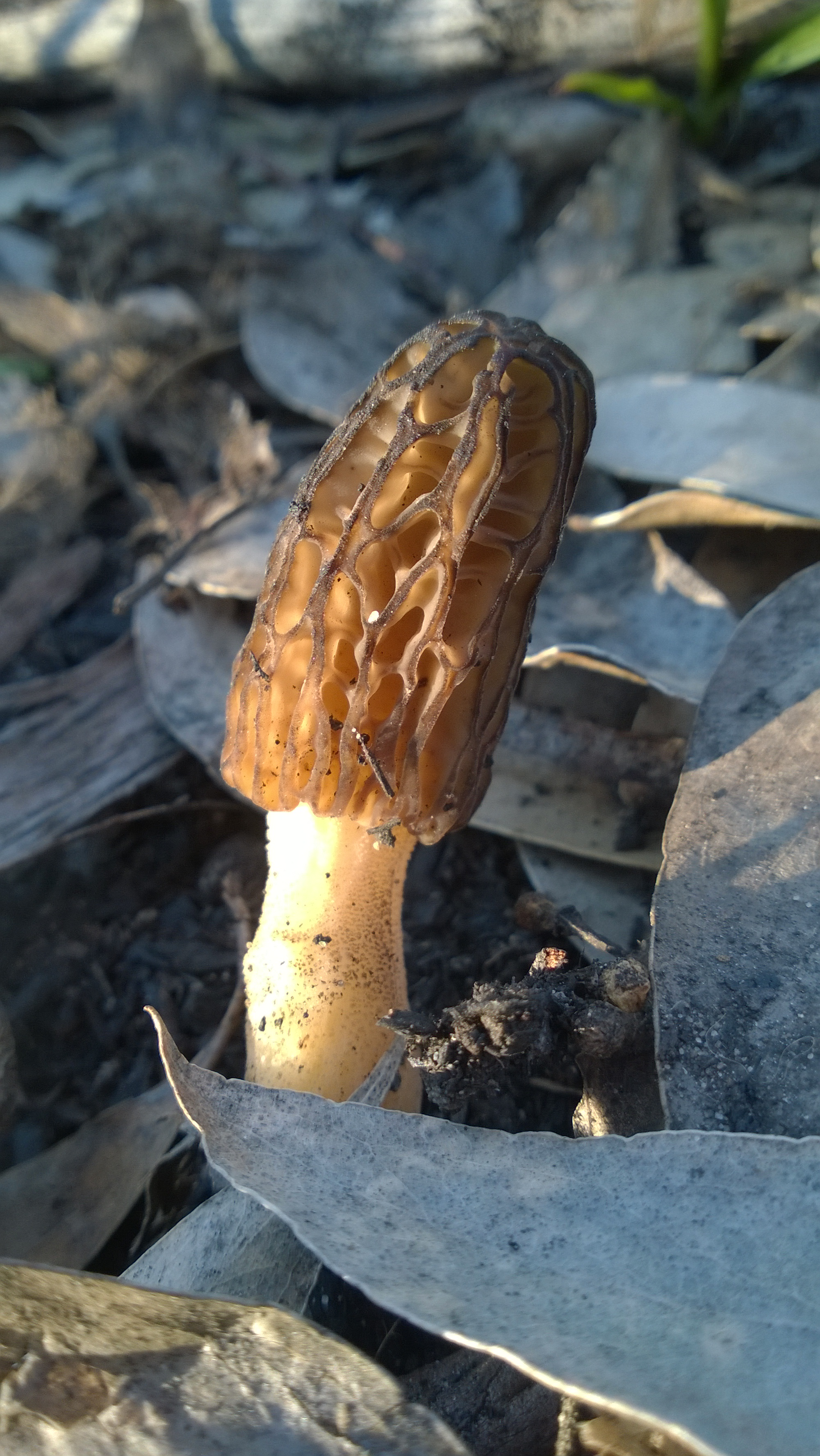

Scientific classification
- Domain: Eukaryota
- Kingdom: Fungi
- Division: Ascomycota
- Class: Pezizomycetes
- Order: Pezizales
- Family: Morchellaceae
- Genus: Morchella
- Species: M. eximia

Binomial name
- Morchella eximia Boud.

= Morchella eximia =

Species of fungus

Morchella eximia is a globally-occurring fungus in the family Morchellaceae (Ascomycota), first described by Émile Boudier in 1910. In an elaborate phylogenetic and nomenclatural revision of the genus in 2014, Richard and colleagues showed that the taxa Morchella anthracophila, Morchella carbonaria, and Morchella septimelata, proposed in 2012 by Clowez and Kuo et al. respectively, are all later synonyms of this old taxon.

Morchella eximia is a fire-associated species, growing abundantly in recently burned forests.
