= Morchella miyabeana =

Scientific classification
- Domain: Eukaryota
- Kingdom: Fungi
- Division: Ascomycota
- Class: Pezizomycetes
- Order: Pezizales
- Family: Morchellaceae
- Genus: Morchella
- Species: M. miyabeana

Binomial name
- Morchella miyabeana S.Imai (1932)

Species of fungus

Morchella miyabeana is a species of fungus in the family Morchellaceae. Described as new to science in 1932 by mycologist Sanshi Imai, it is found in Japan.
