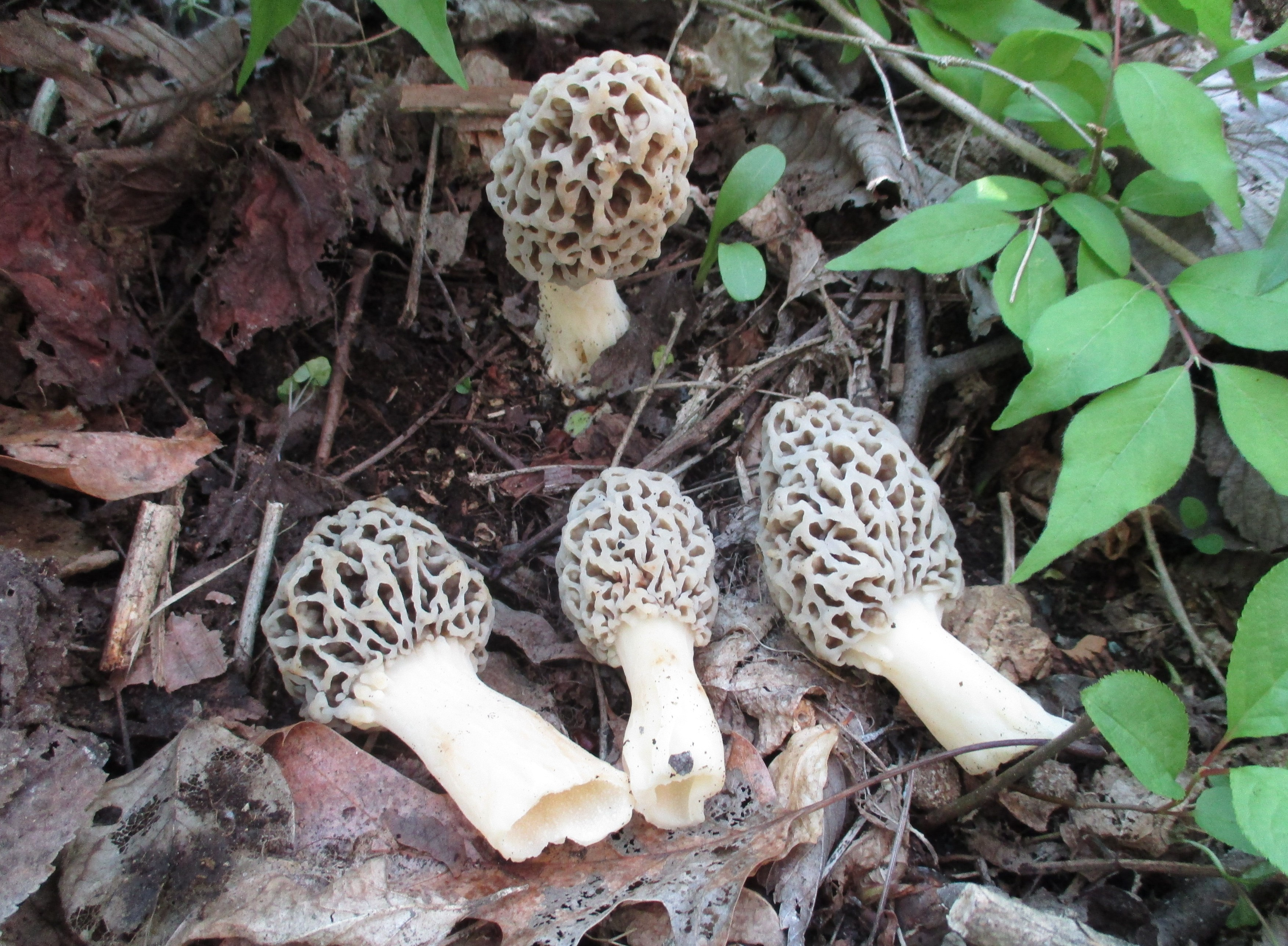
- Morchella ulmaria Clowez found in Danville, Pennsylvania.

Scientific classification
- Kingdom: Fungi
- Division: Ascomycota
- Class: Pezizomycetes
- Order: Pezizales
- Family: Morchellaceae
- Genus: Morchella
- Species: M. ulmaria

Binomial name
- Morchella ulmaria Clowes (2012)

Synonyms
- Morchella cryptica M. Kuo & J.D. Moore (2012)

= Morchella ulmaria =

Species of fungus

Morchella ulmaria is a species of fungus in the family Morchellaceae. It was described as new to science in 2012 by Philippe Clowez. Later in the same year, Michael Kuo and colleagues described Morchella cryptica, which is a junior synonym of M. ulmaria. The species occurs in the forests of Midwestern North America, often associated with white ash (Fraxinus americana), the American tulip tree (Liriodendron tulipifera) or species of maple or elm. It is closely related to M. castanea and 2 unnamed species from Asia.

The range of M. ulmaria overlaps with M. americana, which cannot be reliably distinguished from M. ulmaria without DNA sampling.
