= Morchella palazonii =

Scientific classification
- Domain: Eukaryota
- Kingdom: Fungi
- Division: Ascomycota
- Class: Pezizomycetes
- Order: Pezizales
- Family: Morchellaceae
- Genus: Morchella
- Species: M. palazonii

Binomial name
- Morchella palazonii Clowez & L. Romero

Species of fungus

Morchella palazonii is a species of morel found in Spain.

Morels are edible mushrooms in the family Morchellaceae (Ascomycota). Morchella palazonii was described as new to science in 2015 by Philippe Clowez and colleagues, from collections under holly oak (Quercus ilex) and narrow-leafed ash trees (Fraxinus angustifolia) in Spain.

This edible species is characterised by an elongated cap, a rufescent fruiting body, and small spores.
