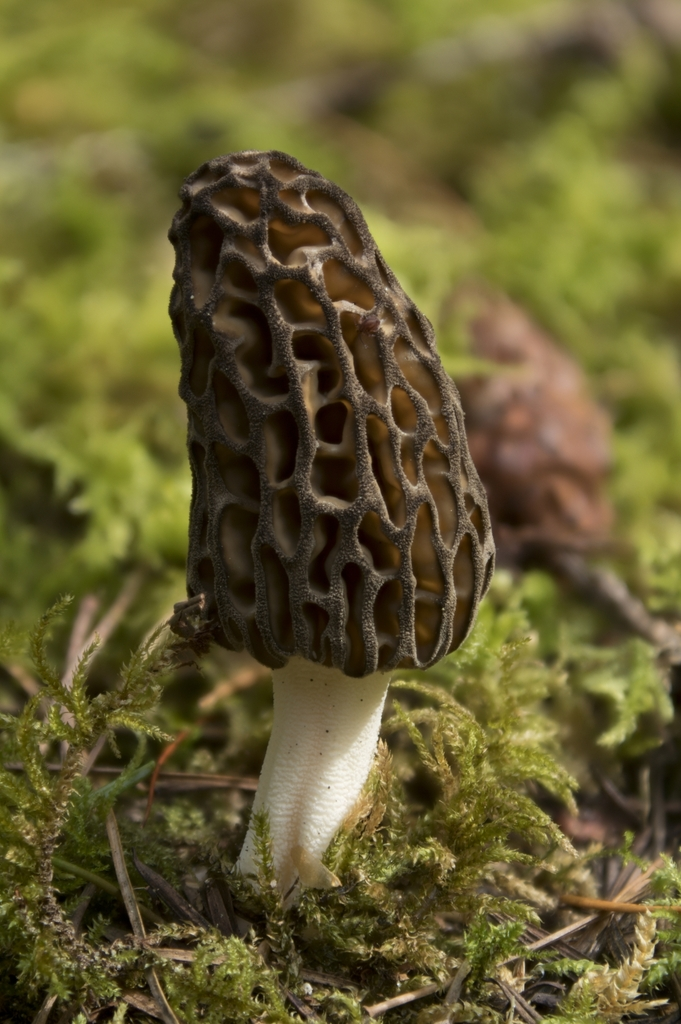

Scientific classification
- Kingdom: Fungi
- Division: Ascomycota
- Class: Pezizomycetes
- Order: Pezizales
- Family: Morchellaceae
- Genus: Morchella
- Species: M. norvegiensis

Binomial name
- Morchella norvegiensis Jacquet.

= Morchella norvegiensis =

Species of mushroom

Morchella norvegiensis
- Mycological characteristics
- Smooth hymenium
- Cap is ovate or conical
- Hymenium attachment is not applicable
- Stipe is bare
- Spore print is cream
- Ecology is mycorrhizal
- Edibility is choice

Morchella norvegiensis, also known as the conifer natural morel, is a conifer-associating species of morel mushroom with a wide distribution, found in the Pacific Northwest region of the U.S. and Canada, as well as scattered reports from Southern Europe.
