= Morchella castaneae =

Scientific classification
- Kingdom: Fungi
- Division: Ascomycota
- Class: Pezizomycetes
- Order: Pezizales
- Family: Morchellaceae
- Genus: Morchella
- Species: M. castaneae

Binomial name
- Morchella castaneae L.Romero & Clowez (2012)

Synonyms
- Morchella brunneorosea Clowez & Ant.Rodr. (2012); Morchella brunneorosea var. sordida Becerra Parra & Clowez (2012)

Species of fungus

Morchella casteneae is a species of fungus in the family Morchellaceae (Ascomycota). It was described as new to science in a 2012 study by Clowez and appears to be confined to the Iberian Peninsula. A subsequent phylogenetic and nomenclatural study by Richard and colleagues has confirmed M. castaneae as a distinct species and showed the taxa Morchella brunneorosea and Morchella brunneorosea var. sordida to be synonymous.
