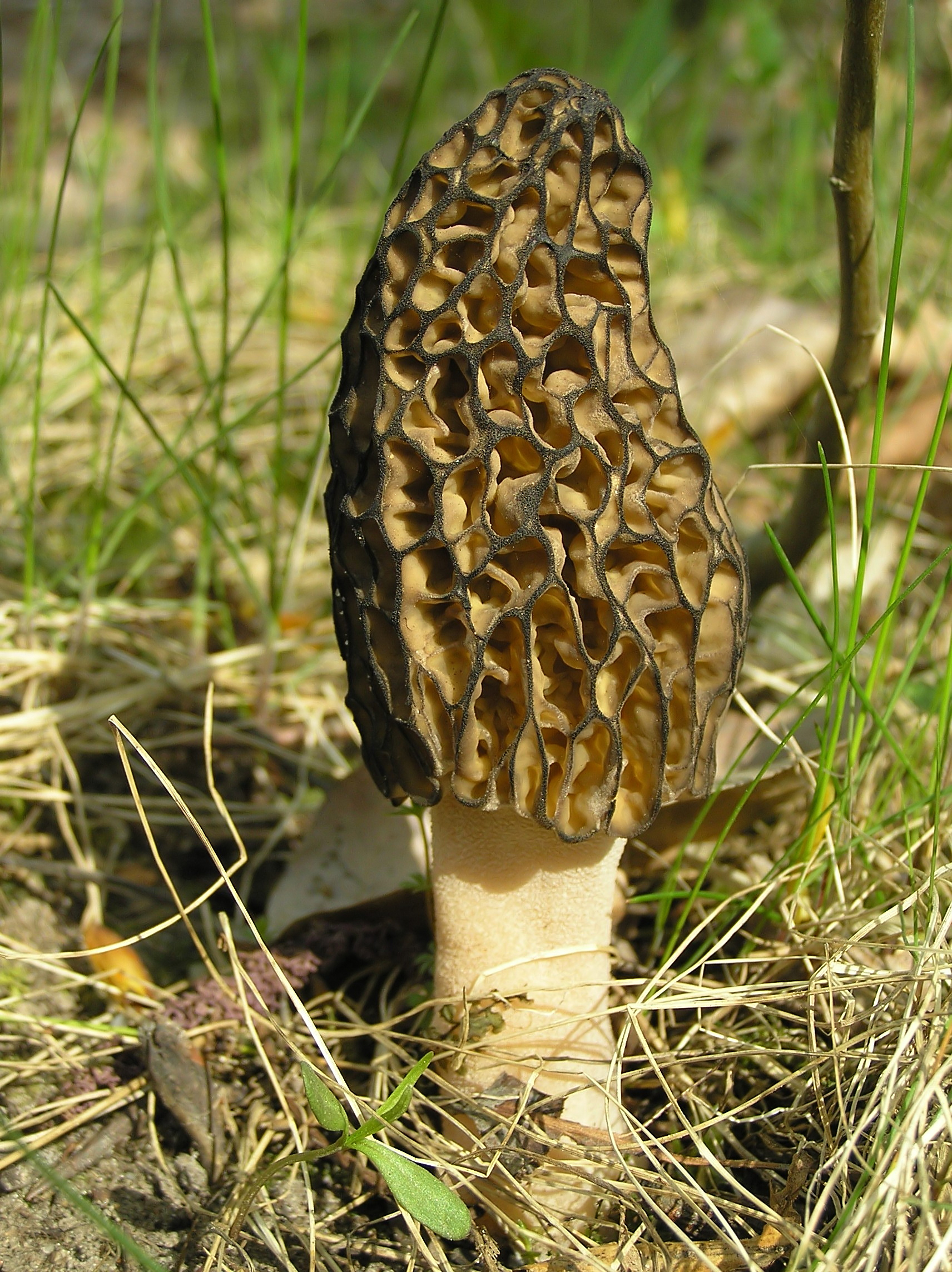
- A black morel in Poland

Scientific classification
- Kingdom: Fungi
- Division: Ascomycota
- Class: Pezizomycetes
- Order: Pezizales
- Family: Morchellaceae
- Genus: Morchella; Dill. ex Pers. : Fr. (1794)

Type species
- Morchella esculenta (L.) Pers. : Fr. (1801)

Species
- ~70 worldwide (see text)

Synonyms
- Phalloboletus Adans. (1763); Boletus Tourn. ex Adans. (1763); Eromitra Lév. (1846); Mitrophora Lév. (1846); Morilla Quél. (1886); Morchella sect. Mitrophorae (Lév.) S.Imai (1932)

= Morchella =

Morel

Genus of fungi

Morchella, the true morels, is a genus of edible sac fungi closely related to anatomically simpler cup fungi in the order Pezizales (division Ascomycota). These distinctive fungi have a honeycomb appearance due to the network of ridges with pits composing their caps.

Morels are prized by gourmet cooks, particularly in Catalan and French cuisine, but can be toxic if consumed raw or undercooked. Due to difficulties in cultivation, commercial harvesting of wild morels has become a multimillion-dollar industry in the temperate Northern Hemisphere, in particular North America, Turkey, China, the Himalayas, India, and Pakistan where these highly prized fungi are found in abundance.

Typified by Morchella esculenta in 1794, the genus has been the source of considerable taxonomical controversy throughout the years, mostly with regard to the number of species involved, with some mycologists recognising as few as three species and others over thirty. Current molecular phylogenetics suggest there might be over seventy species of Morchella worldwide, most of them exhibiting high continental endemism and provincialism.

The genus is currently the focus of extensive phylogenetic, biogeographical, taxonomical and nomenclatural studies, and several new species have been described from Australia, Canada, Cyprus, Israel, Spain, and Turkey.

== Description ==
Morels resemble a honeycomb due to the network of ridges with pits composing their caps. Morels have a convoluted head/cap, and are varied in shape and habitat.

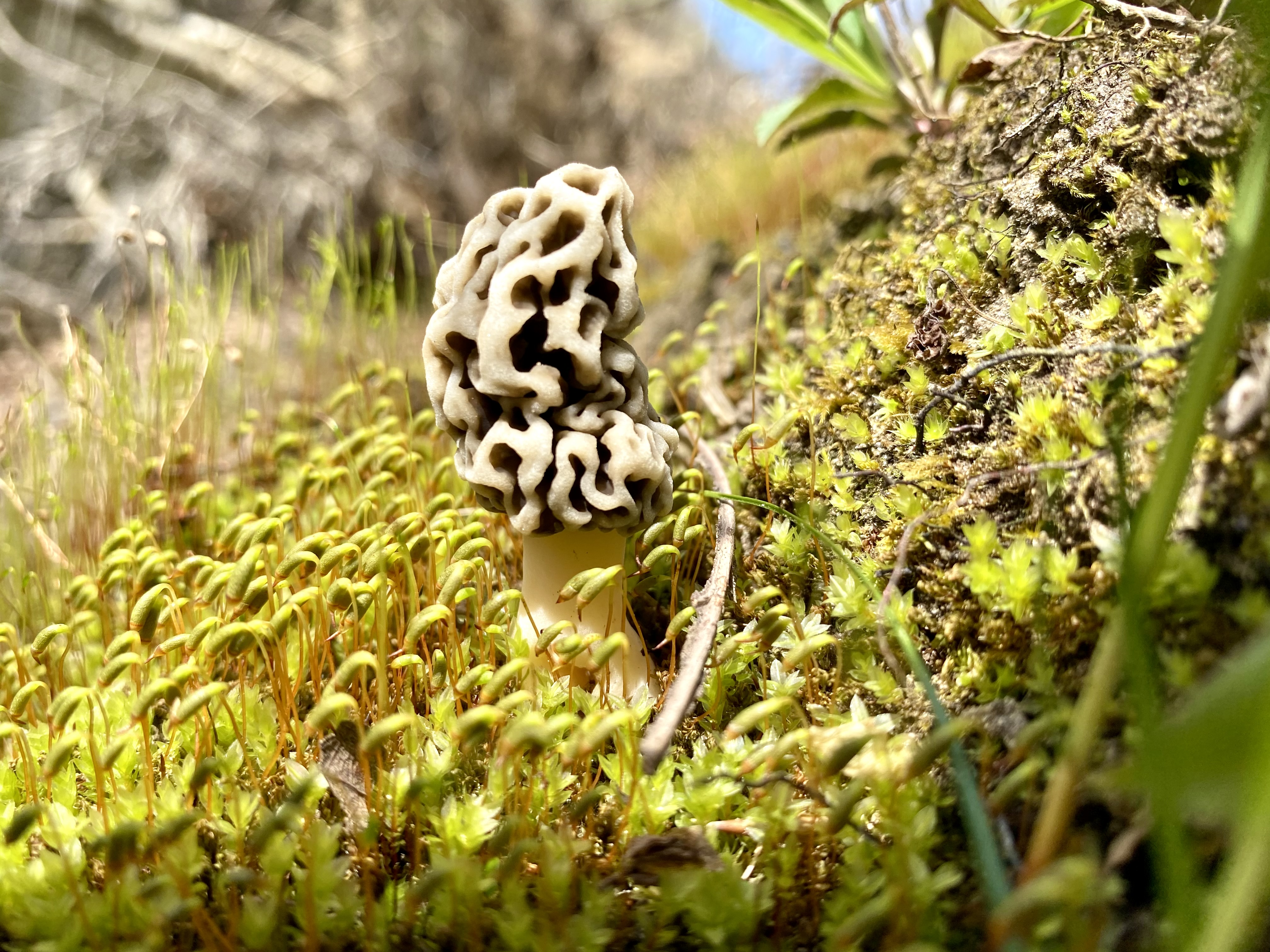

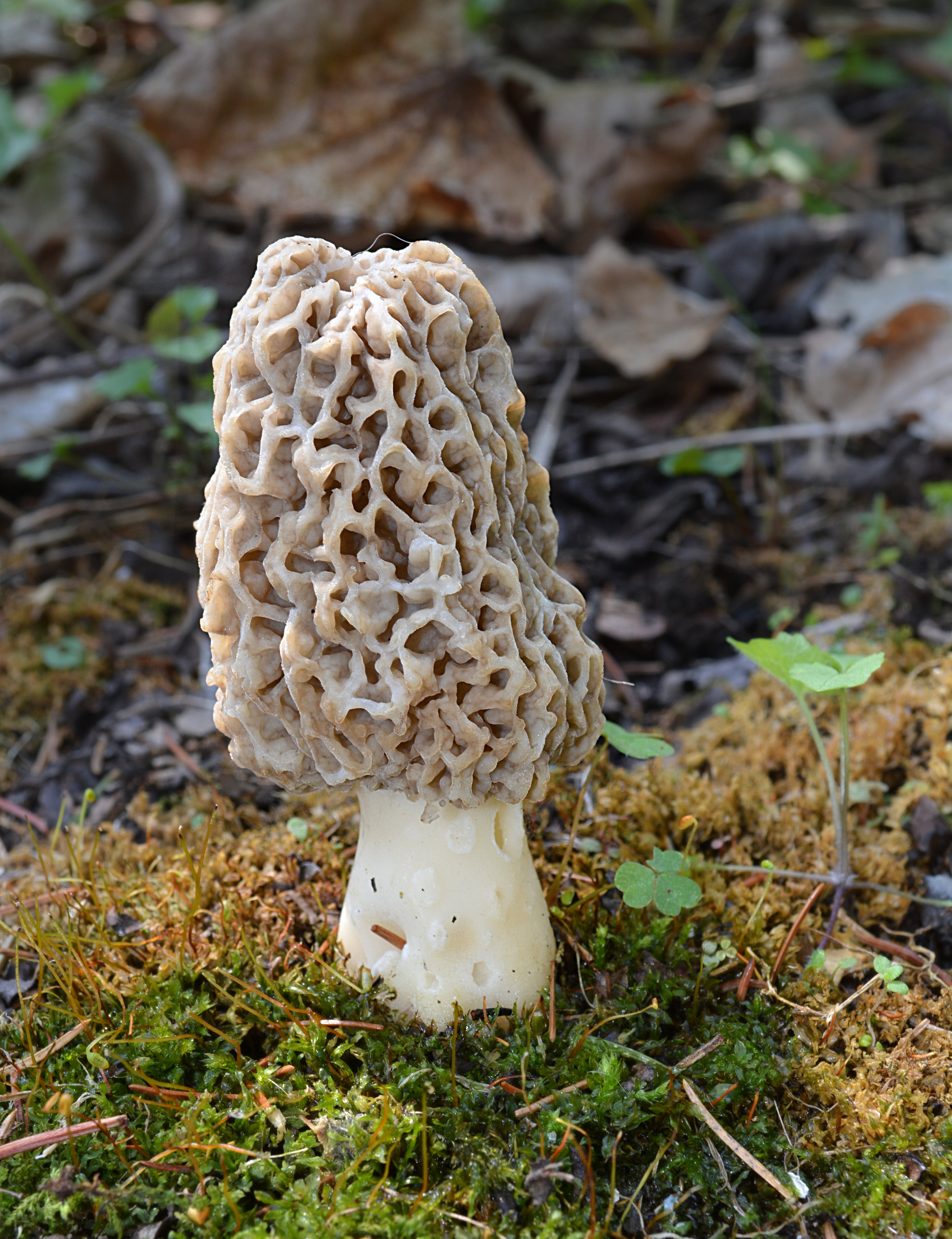

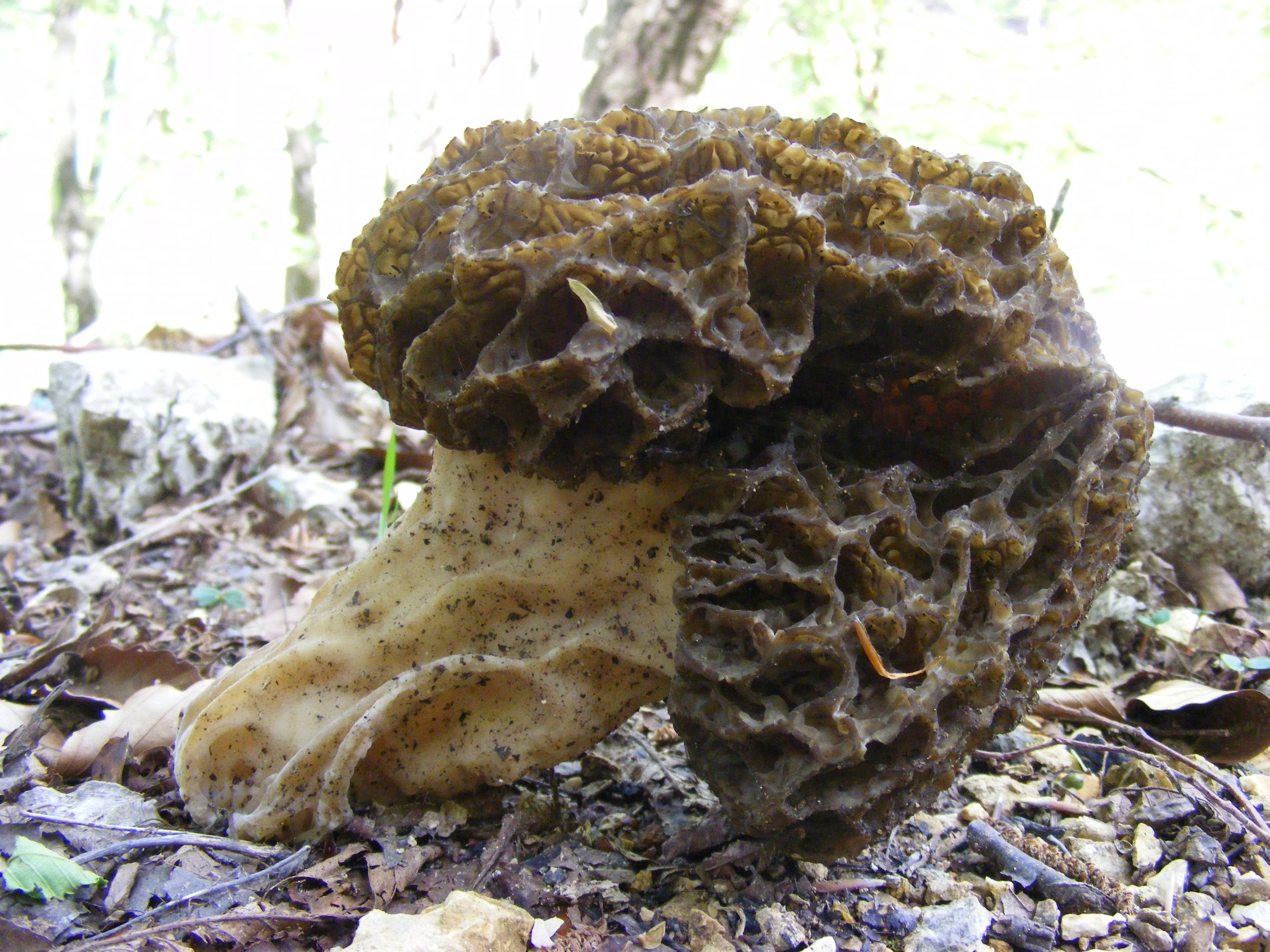

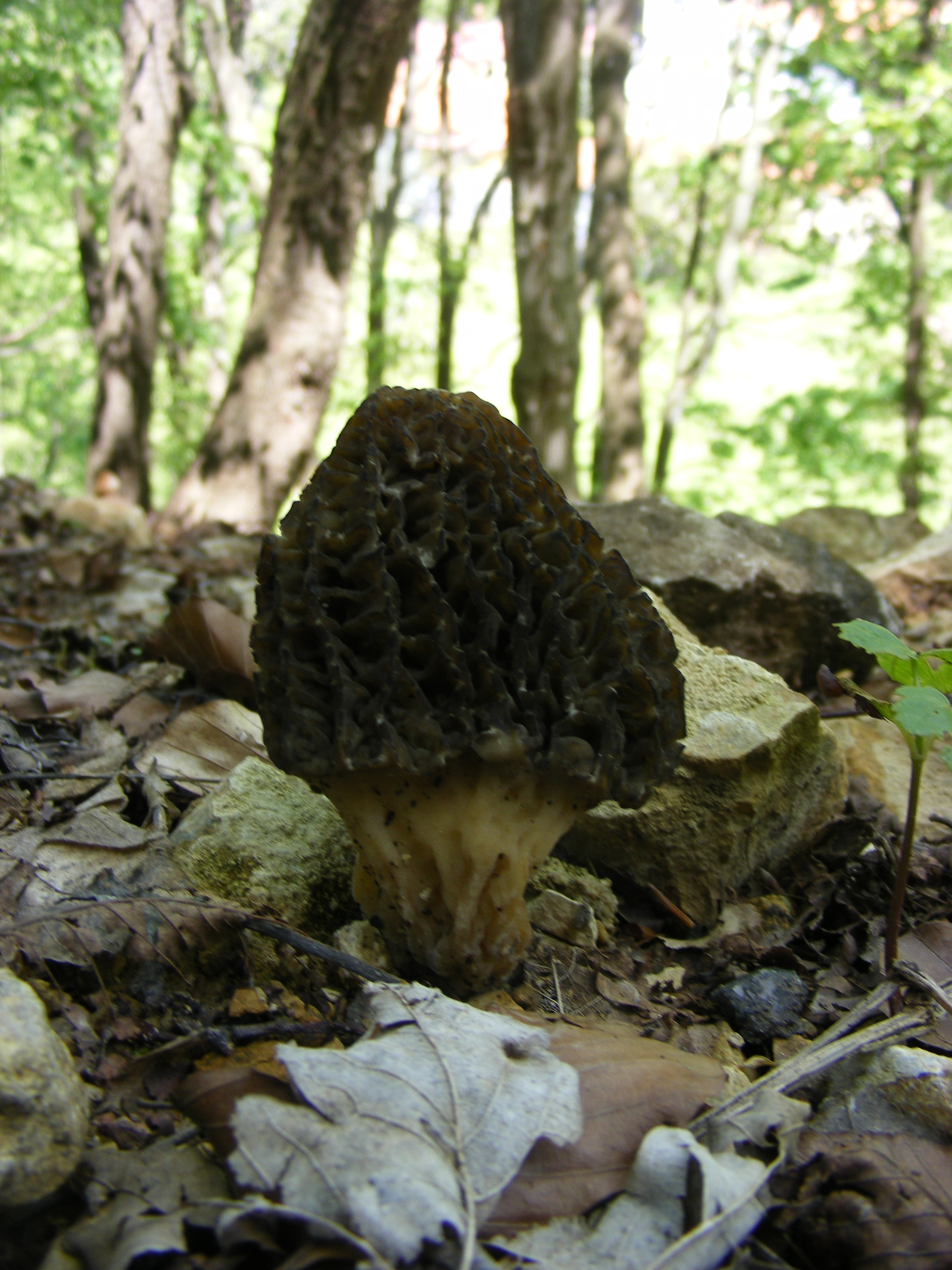

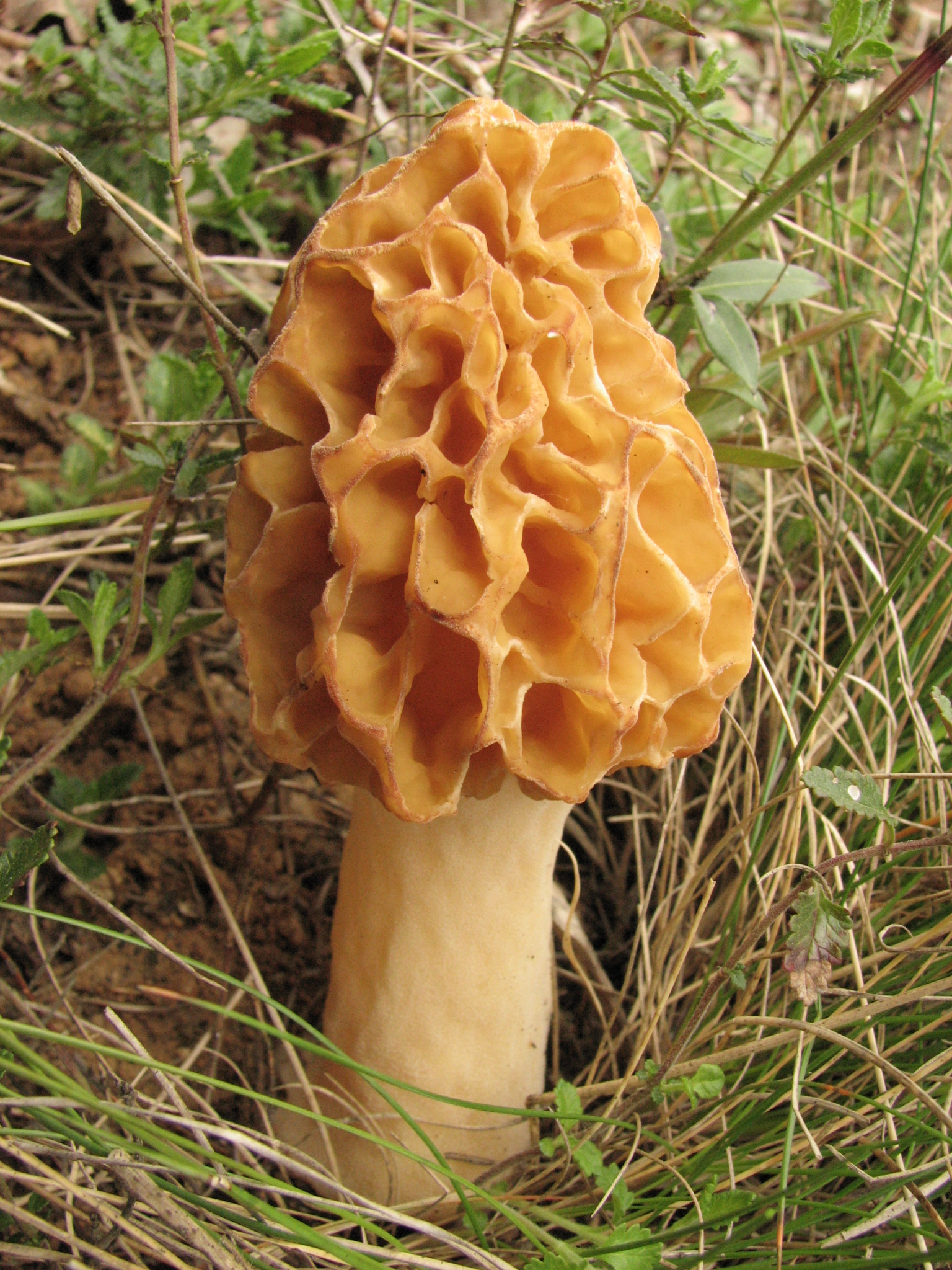

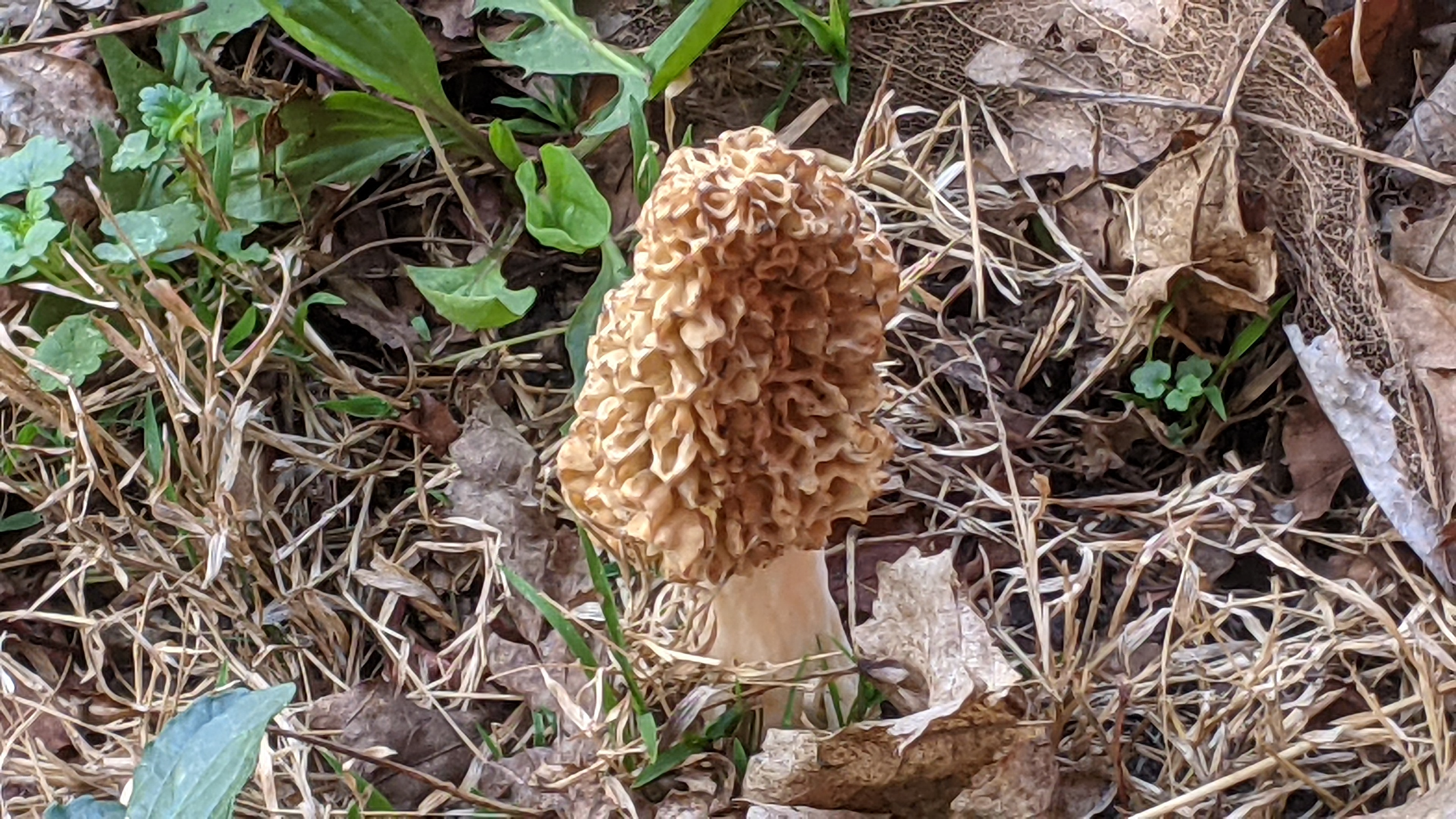

=== Similar species ===
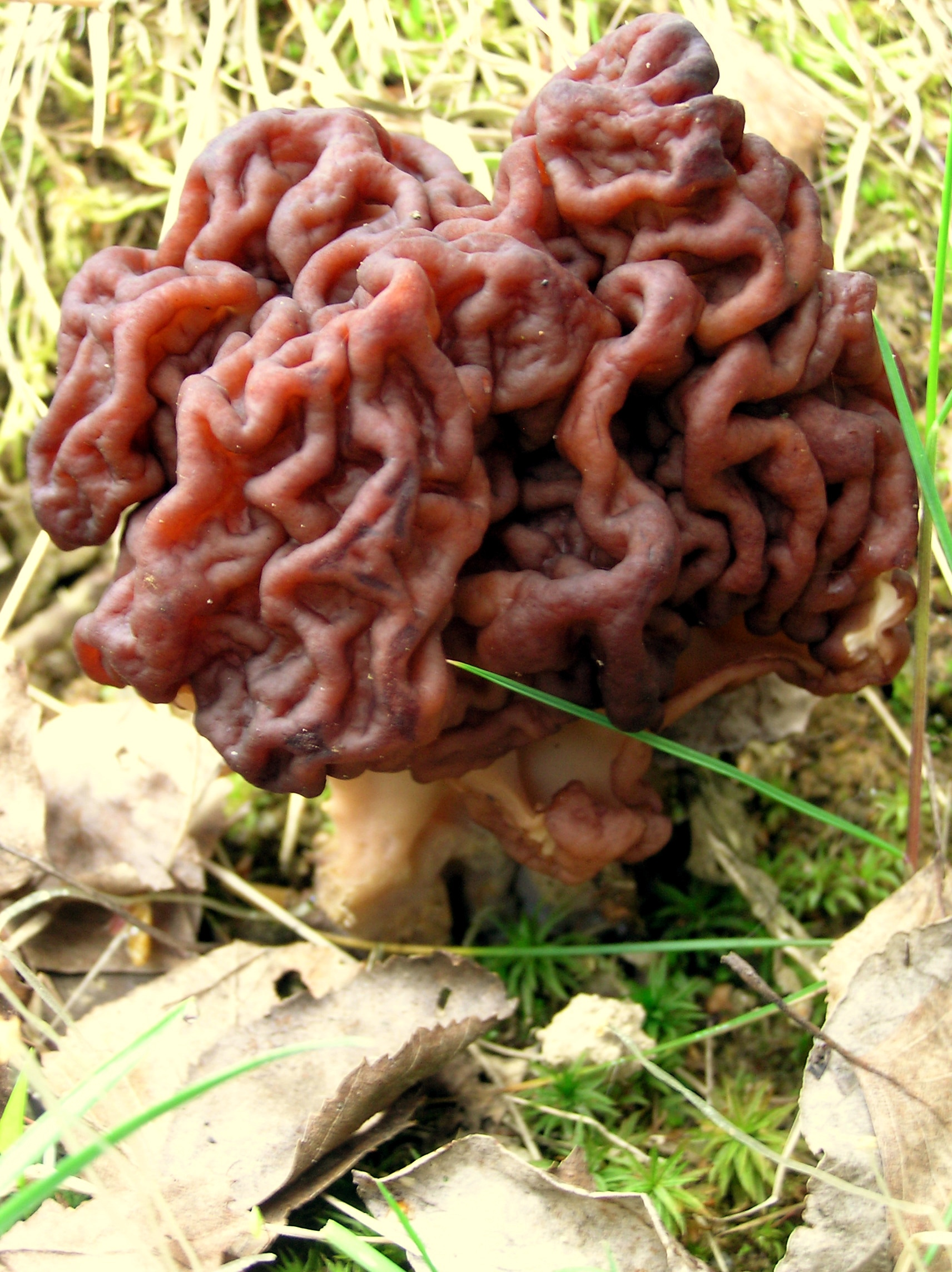
Gyromitra esculenta, a false morel

When foraging for morels, one must be absolutely sure of identification. There are many look-alikes often referred to as "false morels", most notably Gyromitra. These also include members of the most closely related genus, Verpa,. Other mushrooms can also be mistaken for morels, including some species of stinkhorns, or Phallaceae, which have a similarly shaped cap but a distinctive foul odor. It is important to take care when harvesting and identifying mushrooms, particularly morels.

The key morphological features distinguishing false morels from true morels are as follows:

- Gyromitra species often have a "wrinkled" or "cerebral" (brain-like) appearance to the cap due to multiple wrinkles and folds, rather than the honeycomb appearance of true morels due to ridges and pits.
- The caps of morels come in a range of colors including white, grey, black, brown, and yellow. Gyromitra esculenta has a cap that is usually reddish-brown in colour, but sometimes also chestnut, purplish-brown, or dark brown.
- True morels are always hollow when sliced lengthwise, whereas Gyromitra species are typically chambered in longitudinal sections, while Verpa species contain a cottony substance inside their stem. The easiest way to distinguish Verpa species from Morchella species is to slice them longitudinally.
- The caps of Verpa species (V. bohemica, V. conica and others) are attached to the stem only at the apex (top of the cap), unlike true morels which have caps that are attached to the stem at, or near the base of the cap.

== Taxonomy ==
The fruit bodies of Morchella species are highly polymorphic, varying in shape, color, and size. While in many cases they do not exhibit clear-cut distinguishing features microscopically, this has historically contributed to uncertainties in taxonomy. Discriminating between the various taxa described is further hindered by uncertainty over which of these are truly biologically distinct. Remarkably, some authors in the past had suggested that the genus contains as few as 3 to 6 species, while others recognised as many as 34. Efforts to clarify the situation and re-evaluate old classical names (such as Morchella elata and others) in accordance to current phylogenetic data have been challenging, due to vague or ambiguous original descriptions and loss of holotype material. In 2012, the simultaneous description of several new taxa from Europe by Clowez and North America by Kuo and colleagues resulted in several synonyms further complicating matters, until a transatlantic study by Richard and colleagues resolved many of these issues in 2014. The genus is currently undergoing extensive re-evaluation with regard to the taxonomic status of several species.

=== Early taxonomic history ===
Morchella Dill. ex Pers. : Fr. was typified by Christiaan Hendrik Persoon in 1794, with Morchella esculenta designated as the type species for the genus. Among early pioneers who took an interest in the genus, were mycologists Julius Vincenz von Krombholz and Émile Boudier, who, in 1834 and 1897 respectively, published several species and varieties, accompanied by meticulously illustrated iconographic plates. The seminal taxon Morchella elata, whose true identity still remains unresolved, was described by Elias Fries in 1822, from a fir forest in Sweden. Other classical, early-proposed names include Morchella deliciosa, also described by Fries in 1822, Morchella semilibera, the half-free morel, originally described by de Candolle and sanctioned by Fries in 1822, Morchella vulgaris, which was recombined by Samuel Gray as a distinct species in 1821 following a forma of M. esculenta previously proposed by Persoon, and Morchella angusticeps, a large-spored species described by American mycologist Charles Peck in 1887. Morchella purpurascens, the purple morel, was first described by Boudier as a variety of M. elata in 1897 based on an 1834 plate by Krombholz, and was recombined as a distinct species in 1985 by Emile Jacquetant. Morchella eximia, a globally-occurring fire-associated species was also described by Boudier in 1910. The old, widely applied name Morchella conica, featuring in many field guides and literature across several countries, has been shown by Richard and colleagues to be illegitimate.

=== Classification ===
About 80 species of Morchella were described until the turn of the 21st century (per the Index Fungorum), a number of which were later shown to be illegitimate or synonyms. As molecular tools became widely available in the new millennium, a revived interest in the genus commenced and several new species were proposed. In 2008 Kuo described Morchella tomentosa from burned coniferous forests in western North America. In 2010 Işiloğlu and colleagues described Morchella anatolica, a basal species from Turkey later shown to be sister to Morchella rufobrunnea. A study by Clowez described over 20 new species in 2012, while later in the same year, another study by Kuo and colleagues described 19 species from North America. However, several of these newly proposed names later turned out to be synonyms. An extensive taxonomical and nomenclatural revision of the genus provided by Richard and colleagues in 2014, applied names to 30 of the genealogical lineages recognized so far and clarified several synonymities. Also in 2014, Elliott and colleagues described Morchella australiana from sclerophyll forests in Australia, while Clowez and colleagues described Morchella fluvialis from riparian forests in Spain.

In 2015, Loizides and colleagues clarified the taxonomy of Morchella tridentina, a cosmopolitan species described under many names, and recombined Morchella kakiicolor as a distinct species. Later in the same year, Clowez and colleagues described Morchella palazonii from Spain, while Voitk and colleagues described Morchella laurentiana from Canada and Morchella eohespera, a cosmopolitan species present in several continents. In an extensive phylogenetic and morphological study from Cyprus in 2016, Loizides and colleagues added two more Mediterranean species, Morchella arbutiphila and Morchella disparilis, and resurrected Morchella dunensis as an autonomous species. In the same year, Taşkın and colleagues described four of the previously unnamed phylospecies from Turkey: Morchella conifericola, Morchella feekensis, Morchella magnispora and Morchella mediteterraneensis.

==== Section Rufobrunnea ====
- Morchella anatolica
  - synonym: Morchella lanceolata
- Morchella rufobrunnea

==== Section Morchella ====
- Morchella americana
  - synonyms: Morchella californica, Morchella claviformis, Morchella esculentoides, Morchella populina
- Morchella castaneae
  - synonyms: Morchella brunneorosea, Morchella brunneorosea var. sordida
- Morchella diminutiva
- Morchella dunensis
  - synonyms: Morchella esculenta f. dunensis, Morchella andalusiae
- Morchella esculenta
  - synonyms: Morchella pseudoumbrina, Morchella pseudoviridis
- Morchella fluvialis
- Morchella galilaea
- Morchella palazonii
- Morchella prava
- Morchella sceptriformis
  - synonym: Morchella virginiana
- Morchella steppicola
- Morchella ulmaria
  - synonym: Morchella cryptica
- Morchella vulgaris
  - synonyms: Morchella acerina, Morchella anthracina, Morchella lepida, Morchella robiniae, Morchella spongiola

==== Section Distantes ====
- Morchella angusticeps
- Morchella arbutiphila
- Morchella australiana
- Morchella brunnea
- Morchella conifericola
- Morchella deliciosa
  - synonym: Morchella conica
- Morchella disparilis
- Morchella dunalii
  - synonym: Morchella fallax
- Morchella elata
- Morchella eohespera
- Morchella eximia
  - synonyms: Morchella anthracophila, Morchella carbonaria, Morchella septimelata
- Morchella eximioides
- Morchella exuberans
  - synonym: Morchella capitata
- Morchella feekensis
- Morchella iberica
- Morchella importuna
- Morchella kakiicolor
  - synonym: Morchella quercus-ilicis f. kakiicolor
- Morchella laurentiana
- Morchella magnispora
- Morchella mediterraneensis
- Morchella populiphila
- Morchella pulchella
- Morchella punctipes
- Morchella purpurascens
  - synonyms: Morchella elata var. purpurascens, Morchella conica, Morchella conica var. purpurascens, Morchella conica var. crassa
- Morchella semilibera
  - synonyms: Morchella gigas, Morchella gigas var. tintinnabulum, Morchella hybrida, Morchella undosa, Morchella varisiensis, Morchella esculenta var. crassipes, Phallus gigas, Eromitra gigas, Phallus undosus, Phallus crassipes, Mitrophora hybrida, Mitrophora hybrida var. crassipes, Ptychoverpa gigas, Helvella hybrida
- Morchella septentrionalis
- Morchella sextelata
- Morchella snyderi
- Morchella tomentosa
- Morchella tridentina
  - synonyms: Morchella quercus-ilicis, Morchella frustrata, Morchella elatoides, Morchella elatoides var. elagans, Morchella conica var. pseudoeximia

==== Unresolved classification ====
- Morchella anteridiformis
- Morchella apicata
- Morchella bicostata
- Morchella conicopapyracea
- Morchella crassipes
- Morchella deqinensis
- Morchella distans
- Morchella guatemalensis
- Morchella herediana
- Morchella hetieri
- Morchella hortensis
- Morchella hotsonii
- Morchella hungarica
- Morchella inamoena
- Morchella intermedia
- Morchella meiliensis
- Morchella miyabeana
- Morchella neuwirthii
- Morchella norvegiensis
- Morchella patagonica
- Morchella patula
- Morchella pragensis
- Morchella procera
- Morchella pseudovulgaris
- Morchella rielana
- Morchella rigida
- Morchella rigidoides
- Morchella smithiana
- Morchella sulcata
- Morchella tasmanica
- Morchella tatari
- Morchella tibetica
- Morchella umbrina
- Morchella umbrinovelutipes
- Morchella vaporaria

=== Phylogeny ===
Early phylogenetic analyses supported the hypothesis that the genus comprises only a few species with considerable phenotypic variation. Subsequent multigenic DNA studies, however, have revealed more than a dozen genealogically distinct species in North America and at least as many in Europe. DNA studies revealed three discrete clades, or genetic groups, consisting of the "white morels" (Morchella rufobrunnea and M. anatolica), the "yellow morels" (M. esculenta and others), and the "black morels" (M. elata and others). The fire-associated species Morchella tomentosa, commonly known as the "gray morel", is distinct for its fine hairs on the cap ridges and sclerotia-like underground structures, and may also deserve its own clade based on DNA evidence. Within the yellow and black clades, there are dozens of distinct species, many endemic to individual continents or regions. This species-rich view is supported by studies in Western Europe, Turkey, Cyprus, Israel, China, Patagonia, and the Himalayas.

Early ancestral reconstruction tests by O'Donnell and collaborators postulated a western North American origin of morels and the genus was estimated to have diverged from its closest genealogical relatives Verpa and Disciotis in the early Cretaceous, approximately 129 million years ago (Mya). This date was later revised by Du and collaborators, placing the divergence of the genus in the late Jurassic, approximately 154 Mya. However, neither of these reconstructions had included Morchella anatolica in the analyses, whose phylogenetic placement remained at the time unresolved. Following genetic testing of isotype collection of M. anatolica by Taşkın and colleagues, this species was shown to nest in the ancestral /Rufobrunnea clade, together with the transcontinental M. rufobrunnea. This cast doubts over the accuracy of the original reconstructions, since both species of the ancestral /Rufobrunnea clade are present in the Mediterranean, while M. anatolica is altogether absent from North America. Updated ancestral area reconstructions by Loizides and colleagues using an expanded 79-species data set, have in 2021 refuted the previous hypothesis and designated the Mediterranean basin as the most probable place of origin of morels.

== Distribution and habitat ==
Morels can be found in the temperate Northern Hemisphere, in particular North America, Turkey, China, the Himalayas, India, and Pakistan.

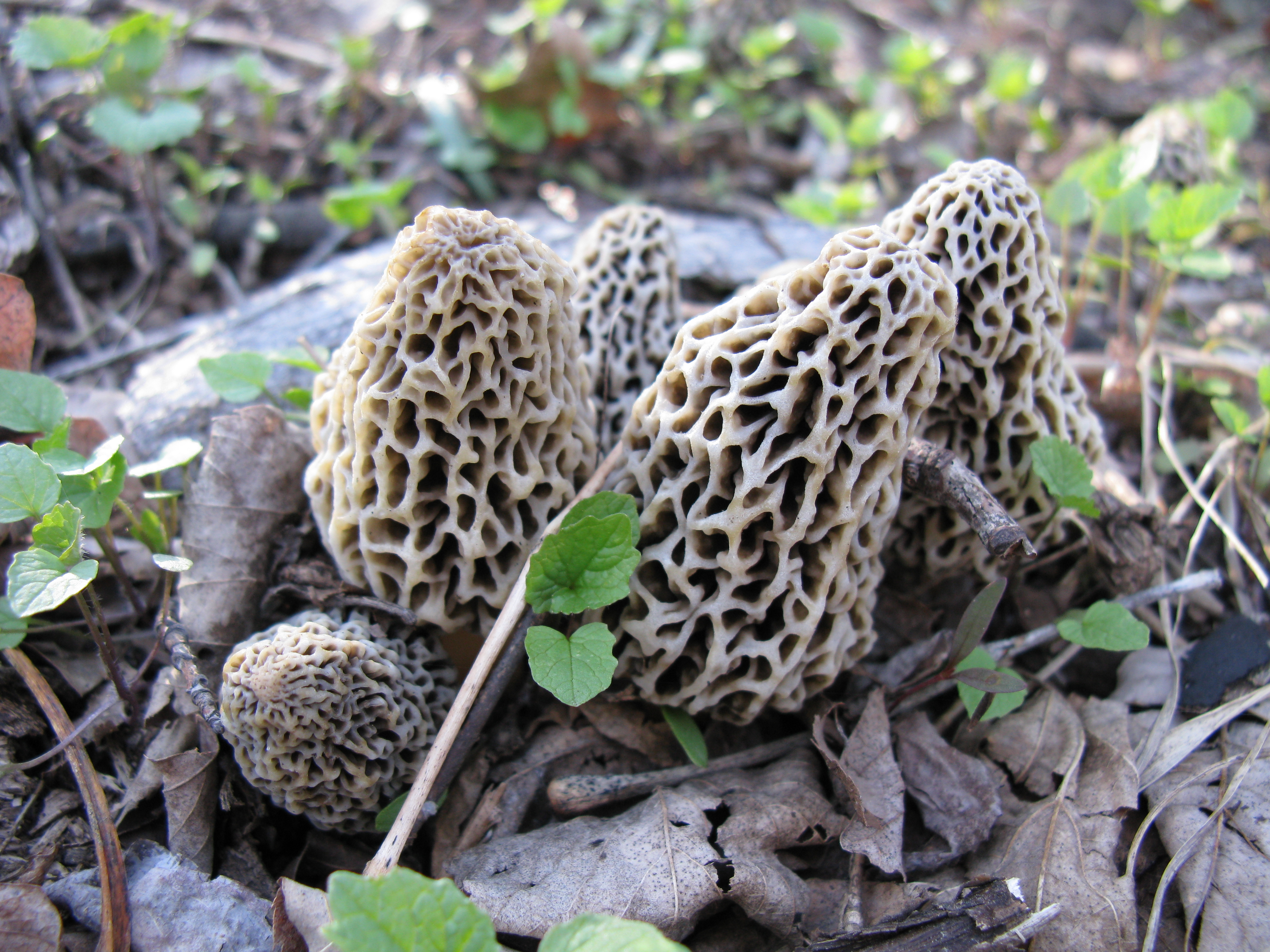
Yellow morels in West Virginia, US

Yellow morels (Morchella esculenta and related species) are more commonly found under deciduous trees rather than conifers, while black morels (M. elata and related species) are mostly found in coniferous forests, disturbed ground and recently burned areas. Morchella galilaea, and occasionally M. rufobrunnea, appear to fruit in the autumn or winter months rather than spring, which is the typical fruiting season for morels. In the American Pacific Northwest, they can be found from April to August.

Efforts to cultivate morels at a large scale have rarely been successful and the commercial morel industry relies on the harvest of wild mushrooms.

=== Transcontinental species ===
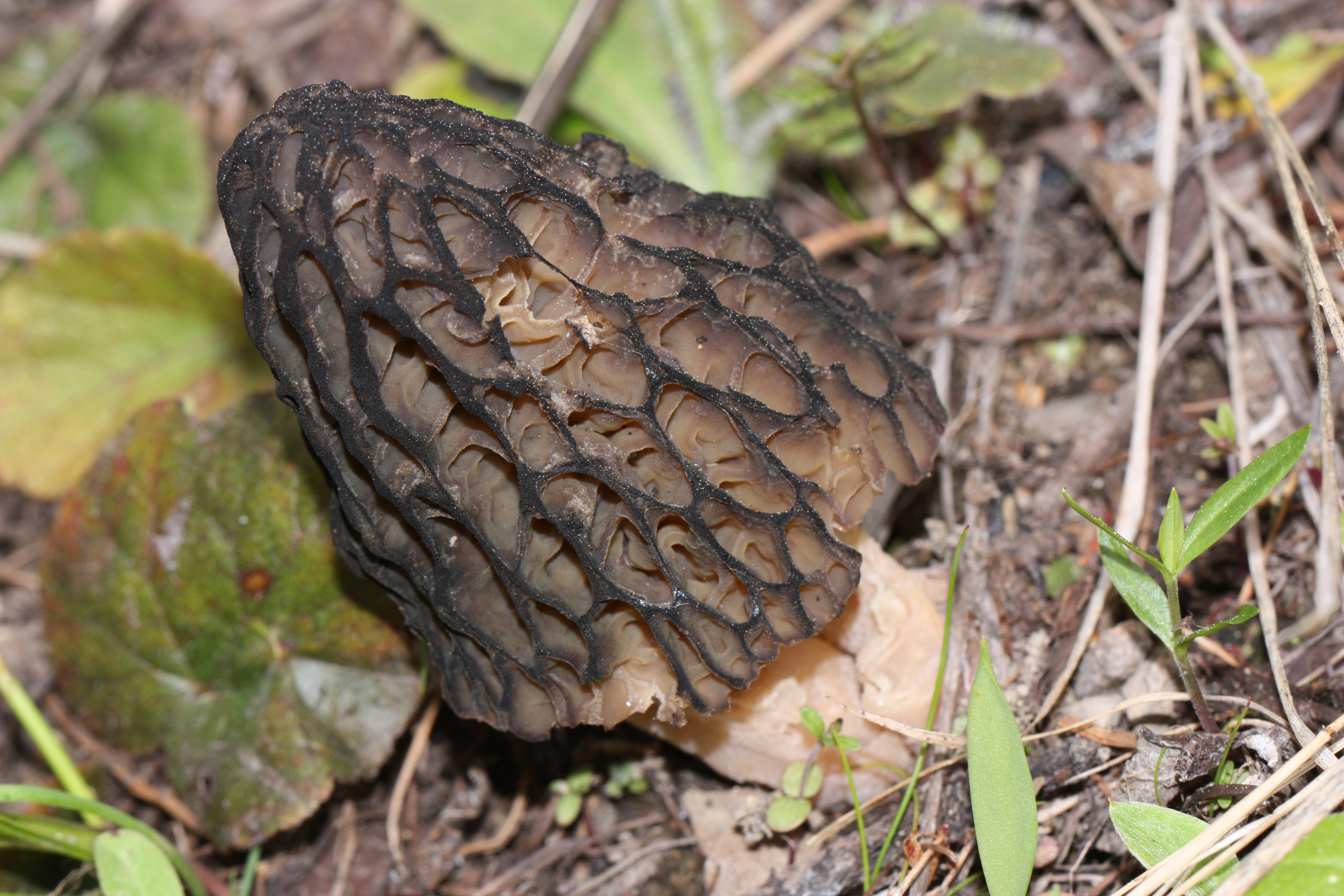
Black morel in Washington state

Although many species within Morchella exhibit continental endemism and provincialism, several species have been phylogenetically shown to be present in more than one continent. So far, the list of transcontinental species includes M. americana, M. eohespera, M. eximia, M. exuberans, M. galilaea, M. importuna, M. populiphila, M. pulchella, M. rufobrunnea, M. semilibera, M. sextelata, M. steppicola, and M. tridentina. The reasons behind the widespread, cosmopolitan distribution of these species, are still puzzling. Some authors have hypothesized that such transcontinental occurrences are the result of accidental anthropogenic introductions, but this view has been disputed by others, who suggested an old and natural distribution, at least for some of these species which appear to be linked to indigenous flora. Long-distance spore dispersal has also been suggested as a possible dispersal mechanism for some species, especially those belonging to fire-adapted lineages. It has been suggested that the widespread but disjunct distribution of some morel species, especially early diverging lineages like M. rufobrunnea and M. tridentina, may be the result of climatic refugia from the Quaternary glaciation.

== Ecology ==
The ecology of Morchella species is not well understood. Many species appear to form symbiotic or endophytic relationships with trees, while others appear to act as saprotrophs.

Tree species associated with Morchella vary greatly depending on the individual species, continent, or region. Trees commonly associated with morels in Europe and across the Mediterranean include Abies (fir), Pinus (pine), Populus (poplar), Ulmus (elm), Quercus (oak), Arbutus (strawberry trees), Castanea (chestnut), Alnus (alder), Olea (olive trees), Malus (apple trees), and Fraxinus (ash). In western North America morels are often found in coniferous forests, including species of Pinus (pine), Abies (fir), Larix (larch), and Pseudotsuga (Douglas-fir), as well as in Populus (cottonwood) riparian forests. Deciduous trees commonly associated with morels in the northern hemisphere include Fraxinus (ash), Platanus (sycamore), Liriodendron (tulip tree), dead and dying elms, cottonwoods, and old apple trees (remnants of orchards). Due to their springtime phenology (March–May), morels are hardly ever found in the vicinity of common poisonous mushrooms such as the death cap (Amanita phalloides), the sulphur tuft (Hypholoma fasciculare), or the fly agaric (Amanita muscaria). They can, however, occur alongside false morels (Gyromitra and Verpa species) and elfin saddles (Helvella species), which also appear in spring.

=== Association with wildfire ===
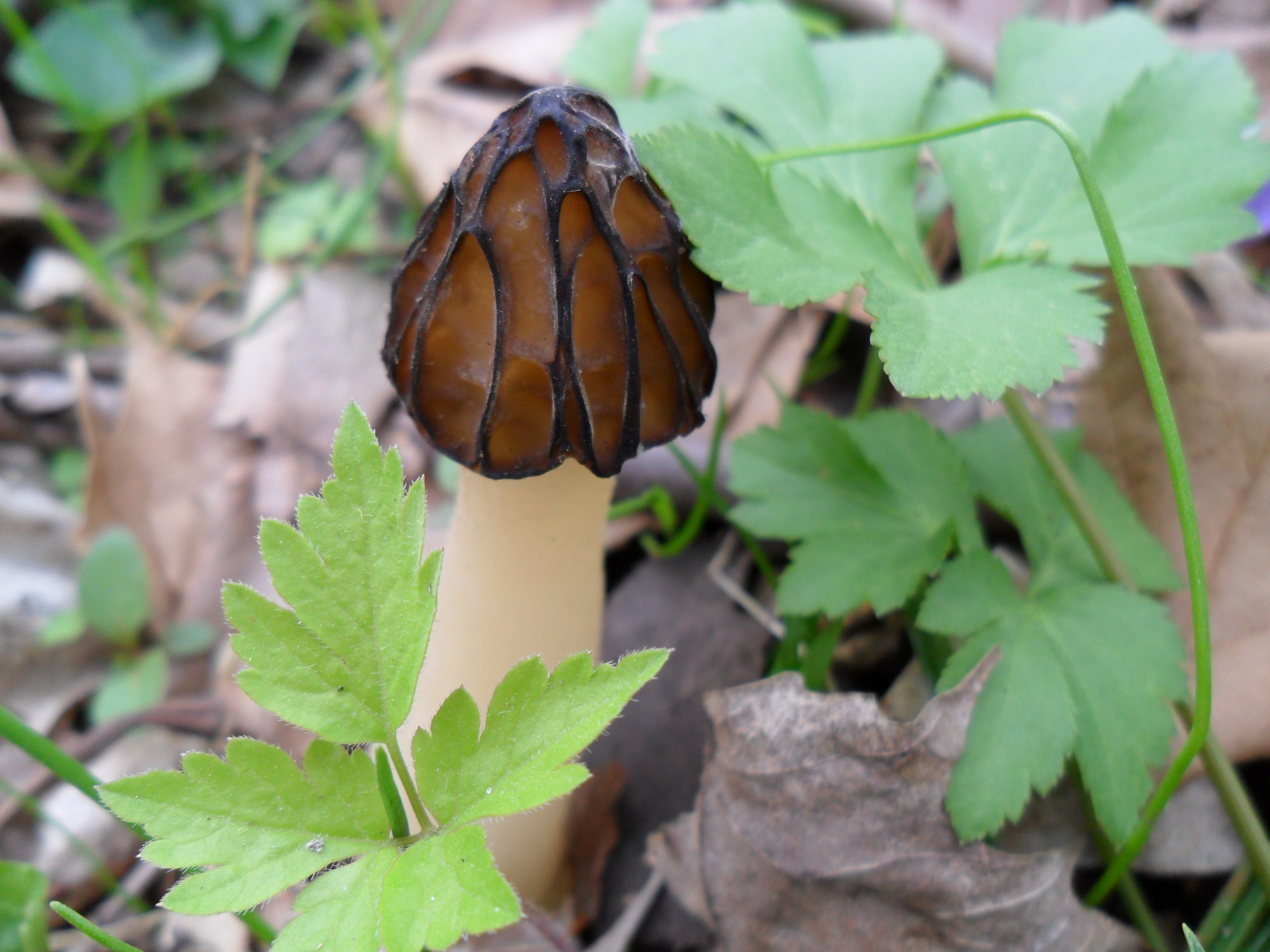
Morchella semilibera in Indiana, US

Certain Morchella species (M. eximia, M. importuna, M. tomentosa and others) exhibit a pyrophilic behaviour and may grow abundantly in forests which have been recently burned by a fire. Moderate-intensity fires are reported to produce higher abundances of morels than low- or high-intensity fires. This is caused by the soil becoming more alkaline as the result of wood ash combining with water and being absorbed into the soil which triggers the morels to fruit. Alkaline soil conditions which trigger fruiting have been observed and exploited with small-scale commercial cultivation of morels. Where fire suppression is practiced, morels often grow in small numbers in the same spot, year after year. If these areas are overrun by wildfire they often produce a bumper crop of black morels the following spring. Commercial pickers and buyers in North America target recently burned areas for this reason. These spots may be closely guarded by mushroom pickers, as morels are widely regarded as a delicacy and often a cash crop.

== Cultivation ==
Due to the mushroom's prized fruit bodies, several attempts have been made to grow the fungus in culture. In 1901, Repin reported successfully obtaining fruit bodies in a cave in which cultures had been established in flower pots nine years previously in 1892.

More recently, small-scale commercial growers have had success growing morels by using partially shaded rows of mulched wood. The rows of mulch piles are inoculated with morel mushroom spores in a solution of water and molasses which are poured over the piles of mulch and then they are allowed to grow undisturbed for several weeks. A solution of wood ashes mixed in water and diluted is subsequently poured over the rows of wood mulch which triggers fruiting of the morels. Morels are known to appear after fires and the alkalinity produced by wood ash mixed with water initiate fruit body formation for most species of morels.

In 2021 it was announced that indoor cultivation of black morels had been successfully achieved after decades of research and experimentation with methods by The Danish Morel Project. The project has been able to cultivate 20 lbs of morels per square yard or around 10 kg per square metre with cost estimates expected to be similar to producing white button mushrooms (Agaricus bisporus). Previous attempts at cultivation had managed to produce sclerotia but encountered issues in getting them to reliably fruit. One of the breakthroughs with this project was growing them in a climate controlled environment in conjunction with grass which is involved in stimulating fruiting in the morel mycelium. Cultivation in this manner has been noted to produce superior morels for culinary uses since they can be assured to be insect, slug and dirt free and therefore do not need to be washed and cleaned like foraged morels. Since washing morels can negatively impact the texture, reliable cultivation may result in more versatility with this ingredient in the kitchen as well as making the delicacy more affordable and accessible.

== Toxicity ==
The consumption of Morchella species can have adverse effects. In 2023, a Montana sushi restaurant serving them was linked to 51 people who experienced gastrointestinal illness, with two reported deaths and three other hospitalizations. The consumption of raw morels in particular is advised against. The unknown mycotoxins that may be present can be neutralized via cooking or drying. Additionally, cooked morels can reportedly cause upset stomachs when consumed with alcohol.

When eating this fungus for the first time, it is advised to consume a small amount to minimize any allergic reaction. As with all fungi, morels for consumption must be clean and free of decay. Morels growing in old apple orchards previously treated with the deprecated insecticide lead arsenate may accumulate levels of toxic lead and arsenic that are unsuitable for human consumption.

== Uses ==
Morels, "almost universally associated with spring," can be found in many habitats. Morel may be more likely to fruit during a period of increasing heat following a chilly period, a preference which is credited for their abundance in areas with cold winters.

Black morels (Morchella elata) are often found on land that has been disturbed by logging burning.

=== Nutrition ===
Morel mushrooms, raw
Nutritional value per 100 g (3.5 oz)
- Energy: 129 kJ (31 kcal)
- Carbohydrates: 5.1 g
- Sugars: 0.6 g
- Dietary fiber: 2.8 g
- Fat: 0.57 g
- Protein: 3.12 g
Vitamins and minerals
Vitamins	Quantity %DV^{†}
Thiamine (B1)	6% 0.069 mg
Riboflavin (B2)	16% 0.205 mg
Niacin (B3)	14% 2.252 mg
Pantothenic acid (B5)	9% 0.44 mg
Vitamin B6	8% 0.136 mg
Folate (B9)	2% 9 μg
Vitamin D	26% 5.1 μg
Minerals	Quantity %DV^{†}
Calcium	3% 43 mg
Iron	68% 12.18 mg
Magnesium	5% 19 mg
Manganese	26% 0.587 mg
Phosphorus	16% 194 mg
Potassium	14% 411 mg
Zinc	18% 2.03 mg
- Other constituents: Quantity
- Water: 90 g
- Link to USDA Database entry
- ^{†}Percentages estimated using US recommendations for adults, except for potassium, which is estimated based on expert recommendation from the National Academies.

Raw morel mushrooms are 90% water, 5% carbohydrates, 3% protein, and 1% fat. A 100 gram reference amount supplies 31 calories, and is a rich source of iron (94% of the Daily Value, DV), manganese, phosphorus, zinc, and vitamin D (34% DV, if having been exposed to sunlight or artificial ultraviolet light). Raw morels contain moderate levels of several B vitamins (table).

=== Gastronomical value and culinary uses ===
They have been called "prized delicacies...they are so esteemed in Europe that people used to set fire to their own forests in hopes of eliciting a bountiful morel crop the next spring!"

Morels are a feature of many cuisines, including Provençal. Their flavor is prized by chefs worldwide, with recipes and preparation methods designed to highlight and preserve it. As with most edible fungi, they are best when collected or bought fresh. They are sometimes added to meat and poultry dishes and soups, and can be used as pasta fillings. As morels are known to contain thermolabile toxins, they must always be cooked before eating.

Morels can be preserved in several ways: They can be 'flash frozen' by simply running under cold water or putting them in a bucket to soak for a few minutes, then spread on a baking tray and placed into a freezer. After freezing, they keep very well with the frozen glaze for a long time in airtight containers. However, when thawed they can sometimes turn slightly mushy, so they are best frozen after steaming or frying. Due to their natural porosity, morels may contain trace amounts of soil which cannot be easily washed out. Any visible soil should be removed with a brush, after cutting the body in half lengthwise, if needed. Mushroom hunters sometimes recommend soaking morels in a bowl of salt water briefly prior to cooking, although many chefs would disagree.

Drying is a popular and effective method for long-term storage, and morels are widely available commercially in this form. Any insect larvae which might be present in the fruit bodies usually drop out during the drying process. Dried morels can then be reconstituted by soaking for 10–20 minutes in warm water or milk, and the soaking liquid can be used as stock.

The flavor of morels is not just appreciated by humans; in Yellowstone National Park, black morels are also known to be consumed by grizzly bears (Ursus arctos horribilis).

== In popular culture ==
Morel hunting is a common springtime activity. Mushroom collectors may carry a mesh collecting bag, so the spores can scatter as one carries the harvest.

Every spring, hundreds of morel enthusiasts gather in Boyne City, Michigan for the National Morel Mushroom Festival, a century-old event. As one observer stated, "if there is a modern, North American reenactment of Geoffrey Chaucer's Canterbury Tales this is it." Other festivals and hunting competitions in North America include the Illinois State Morel Mushroom Hunting Championship, the Ottawa Midwest Morel Fest and the Mesick Michigan Mushroom Festival.

In Tyler Childers 2019 song "All Your'n", he mentions "Fried morels and fine hotels" in the first line of the 2nd verse.

In the farming sim video game Stardew Valley, morels are a consumable item that can be found in the Secret Woods during spring. If the player chooses to allow mushrooms to grow in the Farm Cave, morels have an 8.1% chance of spawning each day regardless of season.

=== Vernacular names ===
Morchella species have been called by many local names; some of the more colorful include dryland fish, because when sliced lengthwise then breaded and fried, their outline resembles the shape of a fish; hickory chickens, as they are known in many parts of Kentucky; and merkels or miracles, based on folklore, of how a mountain family was saved from starvation by eating morels. In parts of West Virginia, they are known as molly moochers, muggins, or muggles. Due to the partial structural and textural similarity to some species of Porifera (sponges), other common names for any true morel are sponge mushroom and waffle mushroom. In the Appalachian woodlands, morels have also been called haystacks, or snakeheads. The Finnish vernacular name huhtasieni, refers to huhta, area cleared for agriculture by the slash and burn method.

The scientific name of the genus Morchella itself, is thought to have derived from morchel, an old German word close to "Möhre", carrot or beet, due to similarity in shape.

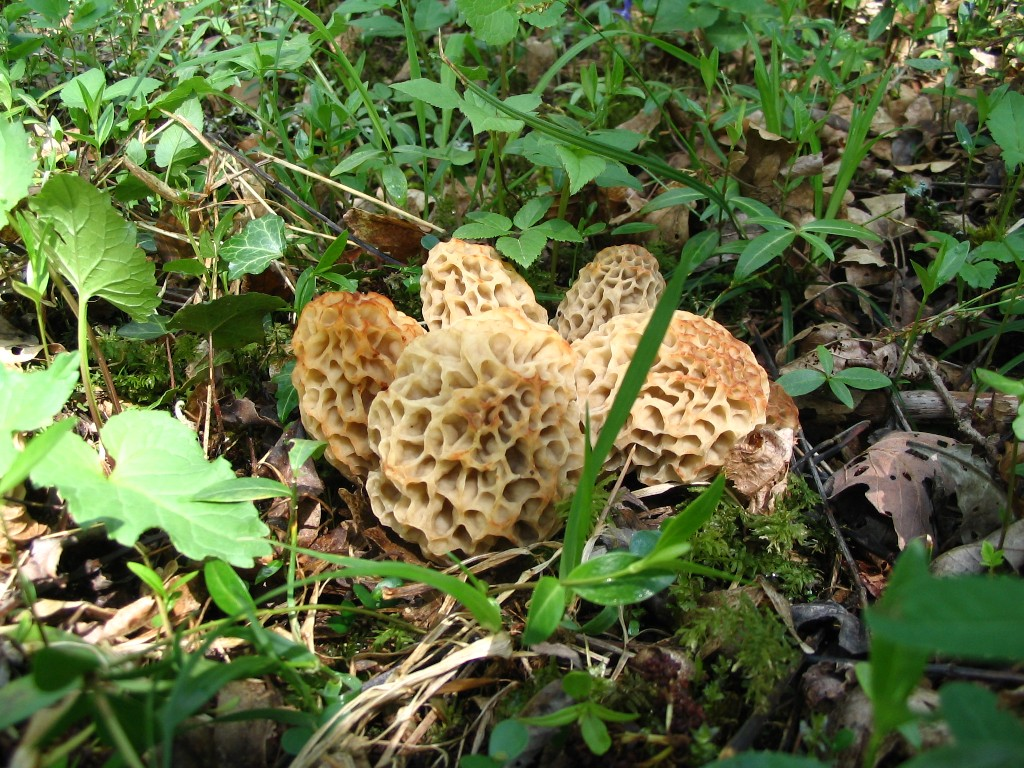
Yellow morels in France

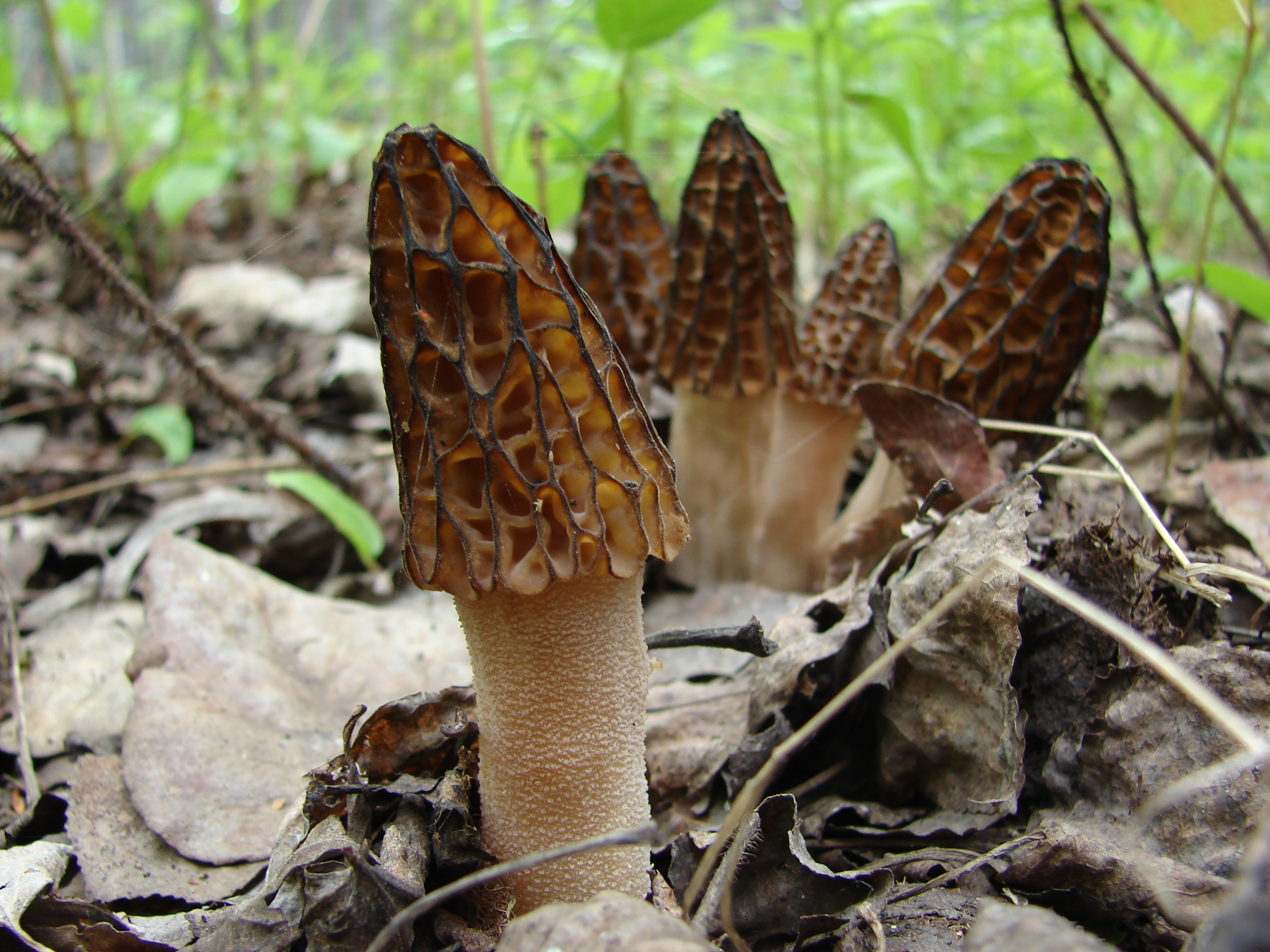
Black morels in British Columbia, Canada

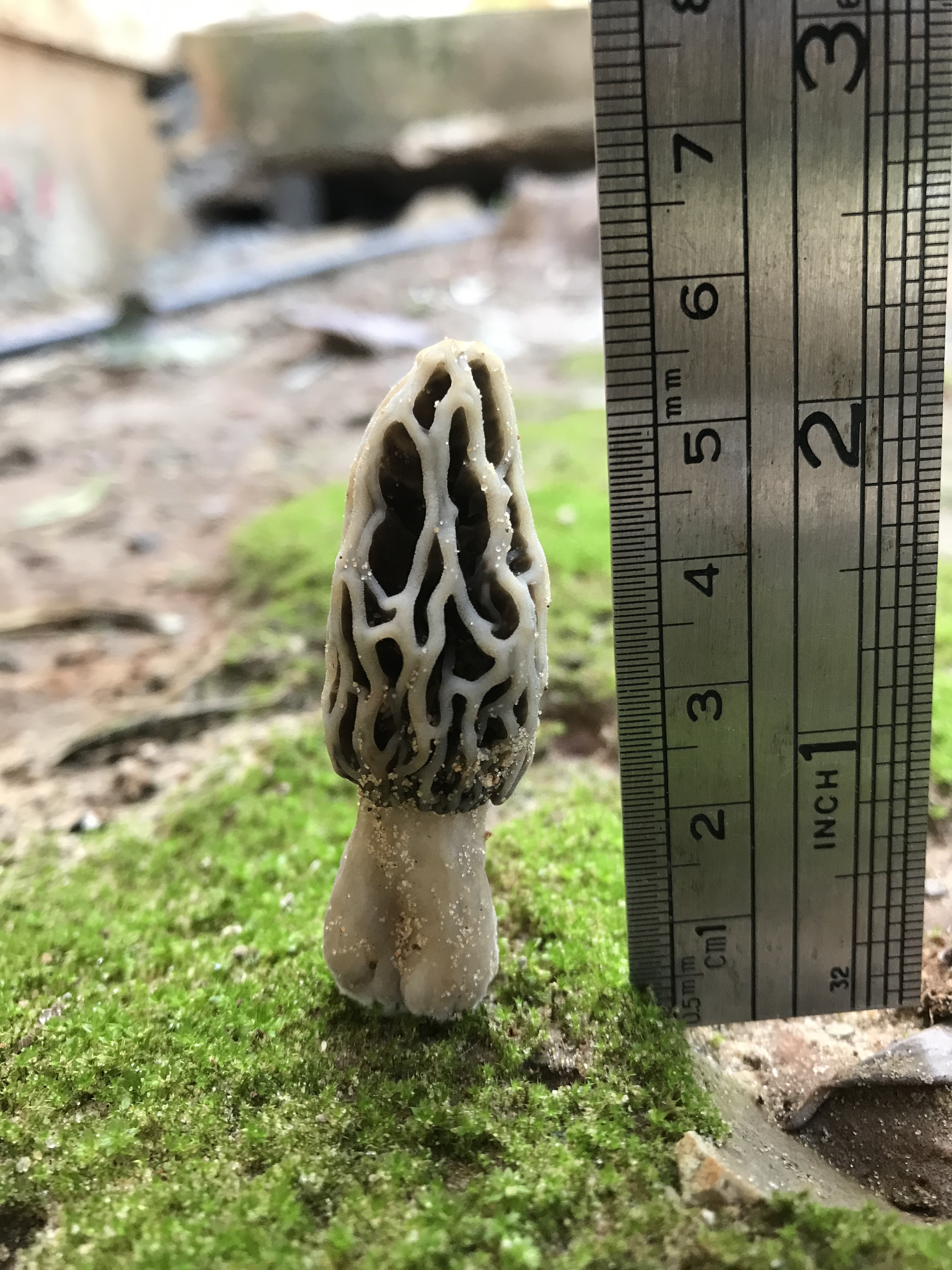
Morel in a house garden in Ben Shemen, Israel
