= Morchella herediana =

Scientific classification
- Domain: Eukaryota
- Kingdom: Fungi
- Division: Ascomycota
- Class: Pezizomycetes
- Order: Pezizales
- Family: Morchellaceae
- Genus: Morchella
- Species: M. herediana

Binomial name
- Morchella herediana L.D.Gómez (1971)

Species of fungus

Morchella herediana is a species of ascomycete fungus in the family Morchellaceae. Described as new to science in 1971 by Luis Diego Gómez, it is found in Costa Rica.
