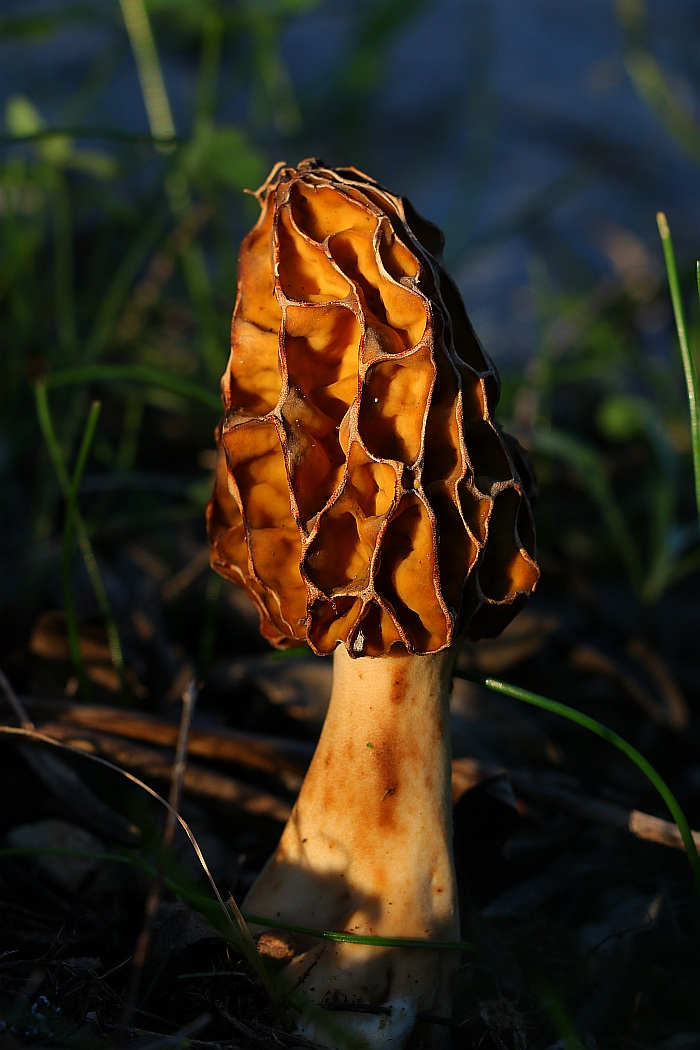
- Morchella galilaea in Malta

Scientific classification
- Kingdom: Fungi
- Division: Ascomycota
- Class: Pezizomycetes
- Order: Pezizales
- Family: Morchellaceae
- Genus: Morchella
- Species: M. galilaea

Binomial name
- Morchella galilaea Masaphy & Clowez (2012)

= Morchella galilaea =

Species of morel fungus

Morchella galilaea is a species of morel fungus in the family Morchellaceae. It was described in 2012 from specimens collected under ash trees in Israel. Unlike most morels which fruit in spring, this species uniquely produces its honey-combed fruiting bodies during autumn (October to December), often in association with olive or pine trees. It is characterized by its cap of pits and ridges that range from silvery grey when young to olive-brown or yellow-brown at maturity, with ridges that start white and become light yellowish with age. Originally found in Israel and Turkey, molecular studies have confirmed its presence across a broad global distribution including parts of Asia, Europe, Africa, Hawaii, and New Zealand.

== Taxonomy ==
Morchella galilaea was described as a new species in 2012. The type collection was made under Fraxinus syriaca plants in Israel. Although first recognised phylogenetically under the informal code "Mes‑16", evaluation of Turkish material—including macro‑ and micromorphological study and multi‑locus phylogenetic analyses—demonstrated its identity with the Israeli collections. Specimens examined from Adana Province, Turkey, were collected between October and December 2009–2012 and deposited in the ANK and Kon herbaria. Molecular data from these specimens cluster reliably with sequences of M. galilaea from Israel and other regions, confirming its distinction among true morels.

== Description ==
The fruiting body (ascoma) of M. galilaea stands 53–78 mm tall and bears a honey‑comb cap (hymenophore) 36–45 mm high by 12.5–17.5 mm wide. The cap comprises a network of pits and ridges: two ridge types occur, narrow polygonal ridges and longer elliptical ridges measuring 5.2–9.8 mm across and 14.5–24.7 mm tall. Young ridges are blunt and white, becoming flattened and light yellowish with age, while the pits range from silvery grey when young to olive‑brown or yellow‑brown at maturity. The stipe is 17–33 mm long and 5–8.2 mm wide, cylindrical with a slightly thickened base, glabrous and white in youth, turning pale yellowish white in maturity. The internal flesh (context) is whitish and very thin within the hollow cap. Under the microscope, ascospores are ellipsoid, smooth to finely wrinkled under scanning electron microscopy, measuring 12.5–19.5 by 7.5–10 μm, borne in eight‑spored, cylindrical asci (165–220 by 15–22 μm). Paraphyses lining the fertile surface are cylindrical to club‑shaped, 100–130 by 6–11 μm, hyaline or containing brownish contents.

== Habitat and distribution ==
In Turkey, M. galilaea has been found fruiting solitary or scattered on volcanic tuff substrates in misted cutting propagation beds at Çukurova University, during October to December. Analysis of the tuff shows a loamy texture with normal calcium carbonate levels, slightly alkaline pH and elevated micronutrients such as copper and iron, suggesting the fungus thrives saphrotrophically on this mineral medium rather than forming a mycorrhizal relationship. Beyond Turkey and Israel, multilocus studies indicate that M. galilaea occurs in China, India, Java, Hawaii, New Zealand and parts of Africa, although fruiting seasons and tree associations vary by region. Unlike most morels, which are characterized by spring season fruiting, M. galilaea fruits in autumn (between October and December). In the Mediterranean region it is often associated with olive trees (e.g. Gozo, Malta) or pine trees. Molecular studies have shown that the fungus is found in China, Java, Hawaii, Israel, New Zealand, India, Croatia, Italy, Sicily, Gozo (Maltese Islands), Majorca (Spain), Réunion (France), Turkey, and three countries in Africa.
