= Morchella tibetica =

Scientific classification
- Domain: Eukaryota
- Kingdom: Fungi
- Division: Ascomycota
- Class: Pezizomycetes
- Order: Pezizales
- Family: Morchellaceae
- Genus: Morchella
- Species: M. tibetica

Binomial name
- Morchella tibetica M.Zang (1987)

Species of fungus

Morchella tibetica is a species of fungus in the family Morchellaceae. Described as new to science in 1987, it is found in Tibet, where it grows in deciduous woodland.
