= Morchella laurentiana =

Scientific classification
- Domain: Eukaryota
- Kingdom: Fungi
- Division: Ascomycota
- Class: Pezizomycetes
- Order: Pezizales
- Family: Morchellaceae
- Genus: Morchella
- Species: M. laurentiana

Binomial name
- Morchella laurentiana A.Voitk, M.Burzynski & K. O'Donnell (2016)

Species of fungus

Morchella laurentiana is a species of fungus in the family Morchellaceae described as new to science in 2016. It is known only from the Saint Lawrence River basin in the Canadian province of Newfoundland and Labrador. It is in the Morchella elata clade.
