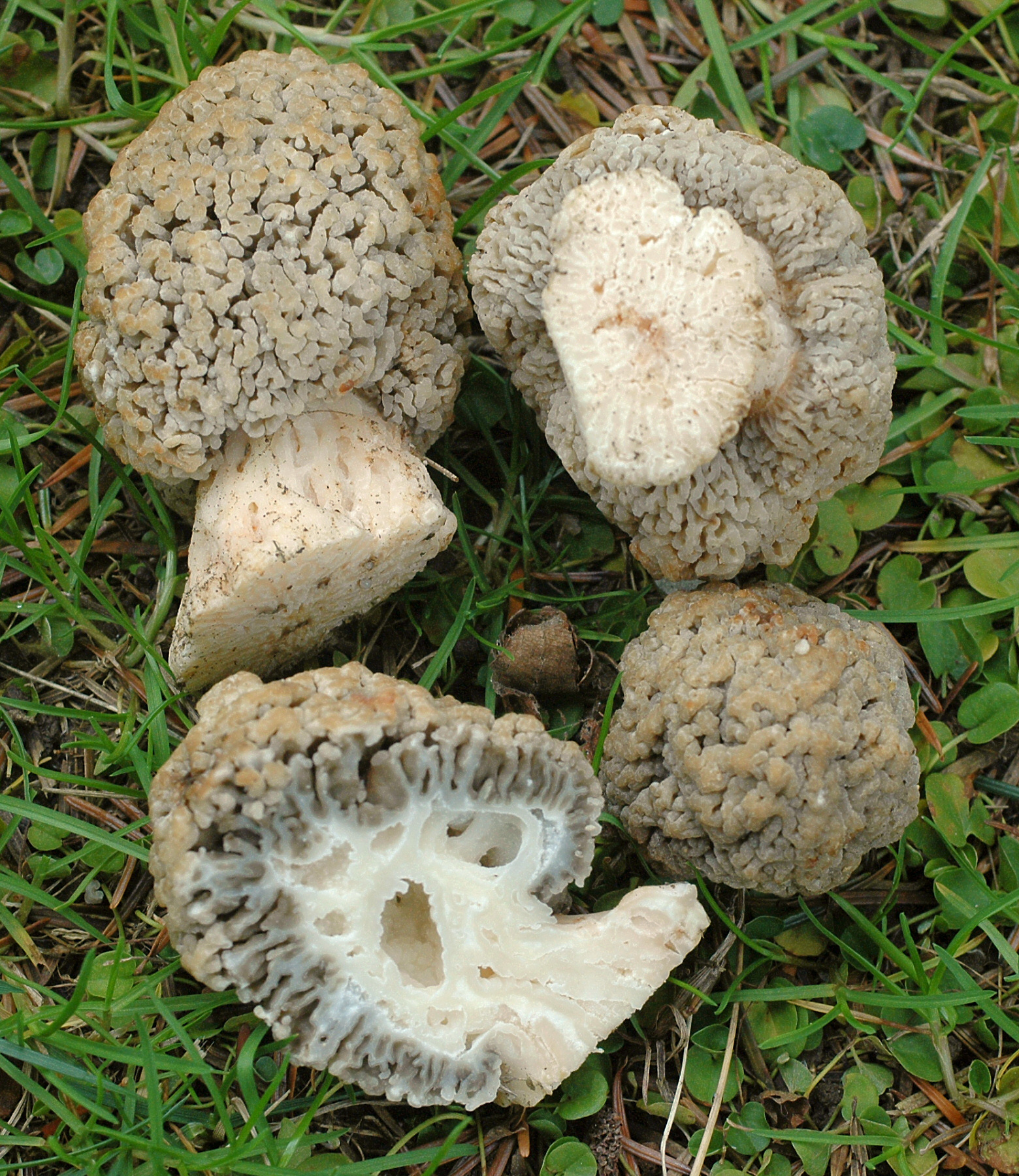

Scientific classification
- Kingdom: Fungi
- Division: Ascomycota
- Class: Pezizomycetes
- Order: Pezizales
- Family: Morchellaceae
- Genus: Morchella
- Species: M. steppicola

Binomial name
- Morchella steppicola Zerova (1941)

= Morchella steppicola =

Species of fungus

Morchella steppicola, commonly known as the morel of the steppes or blistered morel, is a species of fungus in the family Morchellaceae (Ascomycota). Originally described from the steppic meadows of Ukraine in 1941, this ancient relic of the last ice age corresponds to Mes-1, the earliest-diverging phylogenetic lineage in section Esculenta.

Other than its unique –for the genus– ecological adaptation, this species boasts some remarkable features, such as the densely "blistered" or "merulioid" ridges of its cap, a chambered stem, and strongly striate spores.
