= Morchella varisiensis =

Scientific classification
- Kingdom: Fungi
- Division: Ascomycota
- Class: Pezizomycetes
- Order: Pezizales
- Family: Morchellaceae
- Genus: Morchella
- Species: M. varisiensis

Binomial name
- Morchella varisiensis Ruini (2010)

Species of fungus

Morchella varisiensis is a later synonym of Morchella semilibera. The fungus, which belongs to the family Morchellaceae, was described from Italy as a new species in 2010, but subsequent molecular testing of the holotype by Richard and colleagues revealed it to be conspecific to the half-free morel (M. semilibera).
