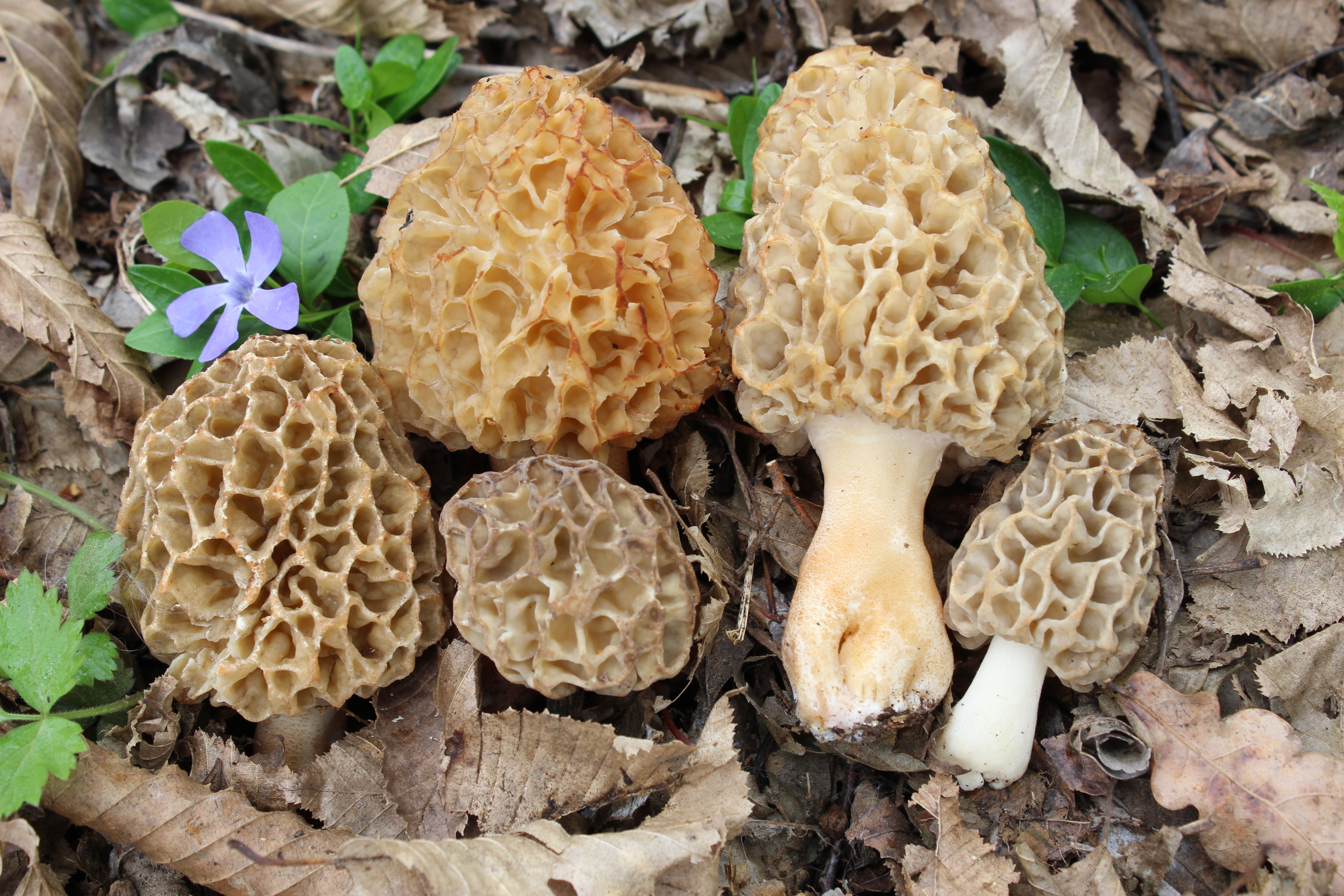

Scientific classification
- Domain: Eukaryota
- Kingdom: Fungi
- Division: Ascomycota
- Class: Pezizomycetes
- Order: Pezizales
- Family: Morchellaceae
- Genus: Morchella
- Species: M. fluvialis

Binomial name
- Morchella fluvialis Clowez, P.Alvarado, M.Becerra, Bilbao & P.A.Moreau (2014)

= Morchella fluvialis =

Species of fungus

Morchella fluvialis is a species of fungus in the family Morchellaceae. It was described as new to science in 2014 by Clowez and colleagues, following collections from riparian forests in Spain under Alnus glutinosa, Ulmus minor and Eucalyptus camaldulensis, although previous collections from Turkey under Pinus nigra have also been reported. This species, which corresponds to phylogenetic lineage Mes-18, is very close to Morchella esculenta, from which it differs in its elongated cap with oblong pits and predominantly longitudinal ridges, pronounced rufescence, as well as its Mediterranean hygrophilic distribution along rivers and streams.
