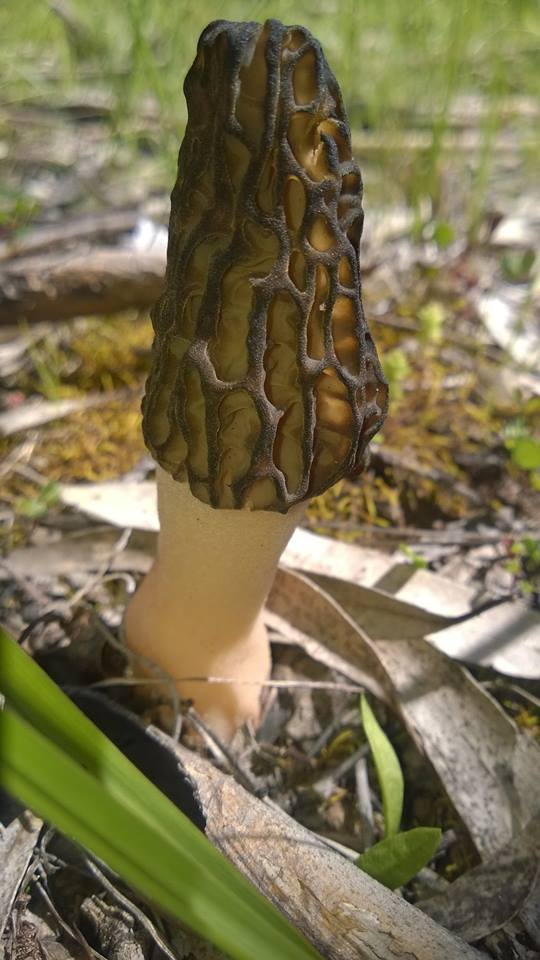
- Australian native morel

Scientific classification
- Domain: Eukaryota
- Kingdom: Fungi
- Division: Ascomycota
- Class: Pezizomycetes
- Order: Pezizales
- Family: Morchellaceae
- Genus: Morchella
- Species: M. australiana

Binomial name
- Morchella australiana T.F.Elliott, Bougher, O’Donnell & Trappe (2014)

= Morchella australiana =

Species of fungus

Morchella australiana is a species of ascomycete fungus in the family Morchellaceae. Described as new to science in 2014, it is found in New South Wales, South Australia, Tasmania and Victoria, Australia. The type locality was in the temperate Pilliga Scrub of northwestern New South Wales, west of the Great Dividing Range. Fruit bodies of the fungus resemble those of the European Morchella elata, but molecular and morphological analyses demonstrated that the Australian species represents a unique lineage.
