= Morchella bicostata =

Scientific classification
- Domain: Eukaryota
- Kingdom: Fungi
- Division: Ascomycota
- Class: Pezizomycetes
- Order: Pezizales
- Family: Morchellaceae
- Genus: Morchella
- Species: M. bicostata

Binomial name
- Morchella bicostata Ji Y.Chen & P.G.Liu (2005)

Species of fungus

Morchella bicostata is a species of fungus in the family Morchellaceae. It is found in southwestern China.
