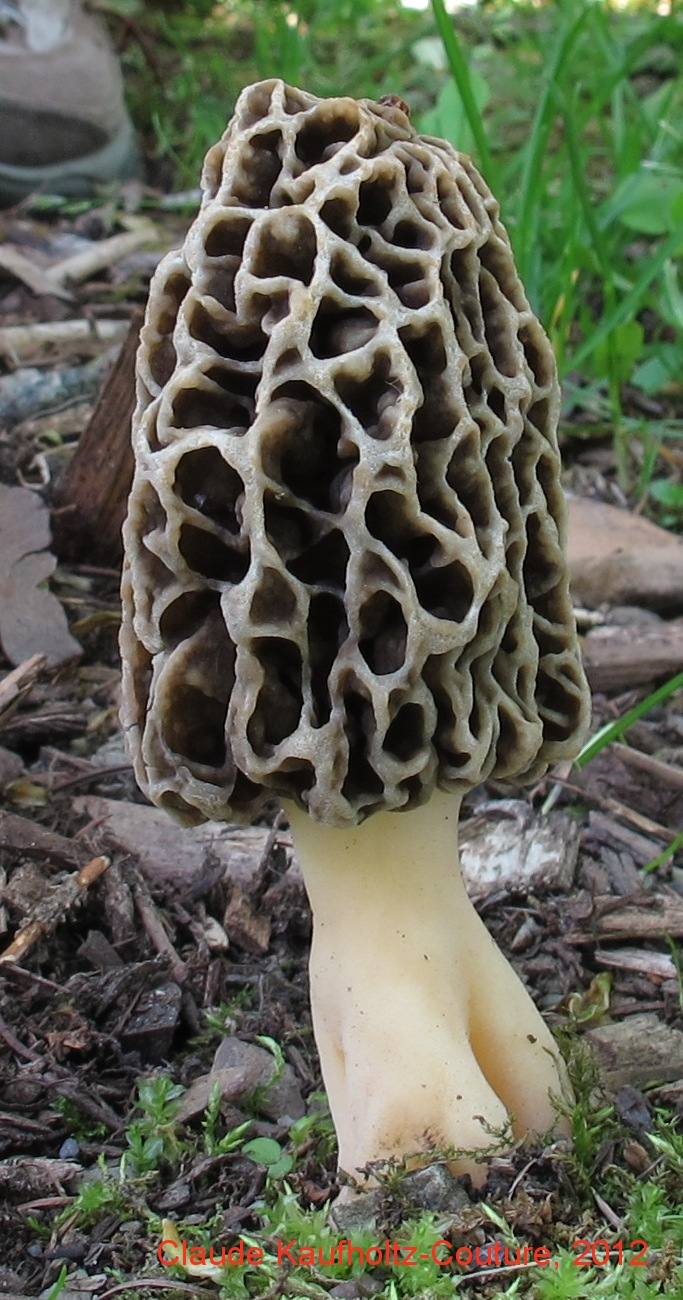

Scientific classification
- Domain: Eukaryota
- Kingdom: Fungi
- Division: Ascomycota
- Class: Pezizomycetes
- Order: Pezizales
- Family: Morchellaceae
- Genus: Morchella
- Species: M. prava

Binomial name
- Morchella prava Dewsbury, Moncalvo, J.D.Moore & M.Kuo (2012)

= Morchella prava =

Species of fungus

Morchella prava is a species of fungus in the family Morchellaceae described as new to science in 2012. It is found in the range 43–50°N across North America, where it fruits from April to June.
