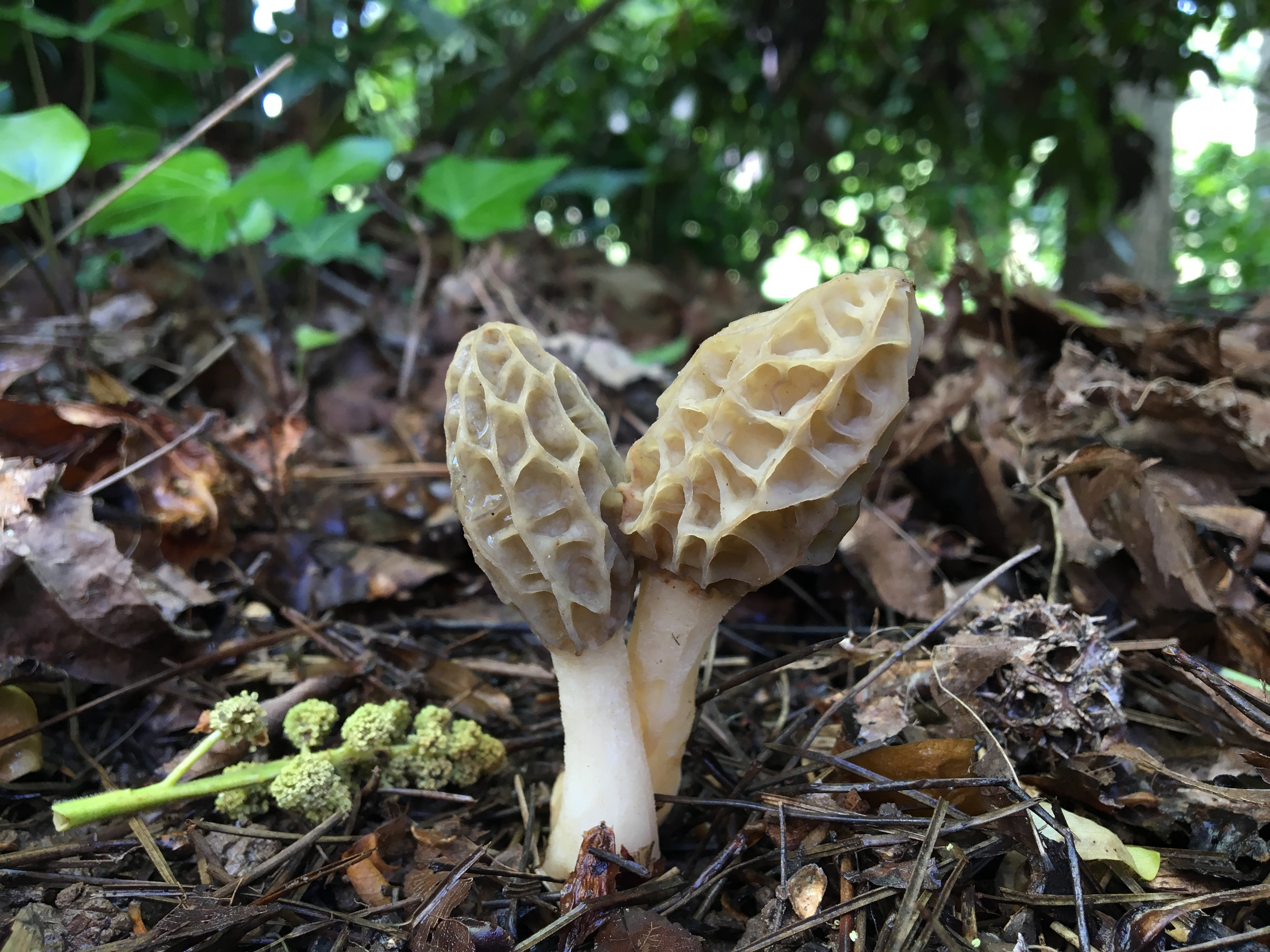

Scientific classification
- Domain: Eukaryota
- Kingdom: Fungi
- Division: Ascomycota
- Class: Pezizomycetes
- Order: Pezizales
- Family: Morchellaceae
- Genus: Morchella
- Species: M. sceptriformis

Binomial name
- Morchella sceptriformis Clowez

Synonyms
- Morchella virginiana O'Donnell & S.A.Rehner (2012)

= Morchella sceptriformis =

Species of fungus

Morchella sceptriformis is a species of fungus in the family Morchellaceae (Ascomycota). It was described as new to science in a 2012 study by Clowez, and corresponds to phylogenetic lineage Mes-3. Morchella virginiana, described later in the same year by Kuo and colleagues, is a junior synonym.

This putatively endemic North American morel is so far known from North Carolina, South Carolina, Mississippi and Virginia, where it is found under the American tulip tree (Liriodendron tulipifera).
