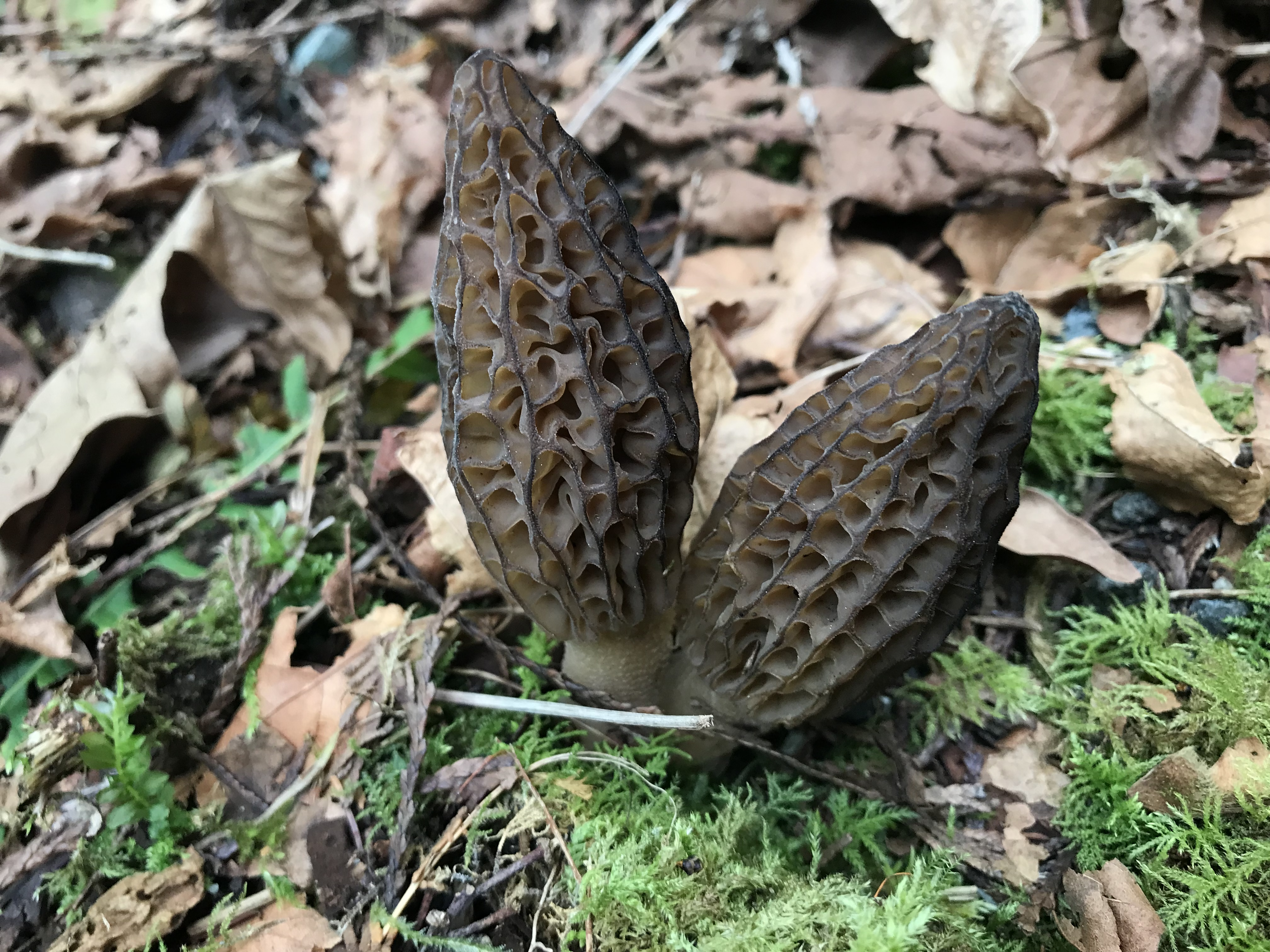
- Morella eohespera found in British Columbia, Canada

Scientific classification
- Kingdom: Fungi
- Division: Ascomycota
- Class: Pezizomycetes
- Order: Pezizales
- Family: Morchellaceae
- Genus: Morchella
- Species: M. eohespera

Binomial name
- Morchella eohespera Beug, A. Voitk & O'Donnell, 2016

= Morchella eohespera =

Species of fungus

Morchella eohespera Mycological characteristics
- Smooth hymenium
- Cap is conical or ovate
- Hymenium attachment is not applicable
- Stipe is bare
- Spore print is white
- Ecology is saprotrophic
- Edibility is not recommended

Morchella eohespera is a species of fungus in the family Morchellaceae described as new to science in 2016. In North America, it has been collected from Newfoundland and Labrador, New Brunswick, British Columbia, Canada and in Washington state. It is also found in central and northern Europe, and central China. It is in the Morchella elata clade.
