= Morchella deqinensis =

Scientific classification
- Domain: Eukaryota
- Kingdom: Fungi
- Division: Ascomycota
- Class: Pezizomycetes
- Order: Pezizales
- Family: Morchellaceae
- Genus: Morchella
- Species: M. deqinensis

Binomial name
- Morchella deqinensis Shu H.Li, Y.C.Zhao, H.M.Chai & M.H.Zhong (2006)

Species of fungus

Morchella deqinensis is a species of fungus in the family Morchellaceae found in China. It grows in coniferous and mixed forests at an elevation of 2,800–3,200 m (9,200–10,500 ft).

== Taxonomy ==
The species was reported as new to science in 2006 by Shu-Hong Li and colleagues from the Yunnan Agricultural University. The specific epithet deqinensis refers to Dêqên County in Yunnan, where the type specimen was collected.

== Description ==
Fruit bodies are 5.2 to 9.5 cm (2.0 to 3.7 in) tall; of this, the egg-shaped to broadly conical cap is 2.3 to 4.3 cm (0.9 to 1.7 in) wide by 1.8 to 3.2 cm (0.71 to 1.26 in) tall. Its surface features sparse, vertically arranged ridges that are dark greenish-brown in colour. The intersection of vertical and horizontal ridges form irregularly shaped, cream-coloured pits that are generally two or three times as long as they are wide. The flesh is firm and thin, and lacks any distinct odour or taste. The cap is completely attached to the hollow, conical stipe, which measures 2.6–5.8 cm (1.0–2.3 in) long by 0.8–3 cm (0.31–1.18 in) wide. Initially whitish, it becomes rust-coloured in maturity or after drying. White granules are present at the top of the stipe and in the grooves at the base.

The hymenium (fertile, spore-bearing surface) is 6–10 μm thick. Asci (spore-bearing cells) are cylindrical, eight-spored, hyaline (translucent) and measure 9.9–10.5 μm thick by 105–150 μm long. In deposit, the spores are cream coloured. Spores are ellipsoid to egg-shaped, smooth, hyaline, and have dimensions of 6.4–8.1 by 9.2–9.6 μm. They are thin walled and lack oil droplets. Paraphyses are club shaped with a septum at the base, and measure 3.6–4.5 by 43 μm.

=== Similar species ===
Morchella umbrina is somewhat similar in appearance to M. deqinensis, but the former species can be distinguished by its deeper colour, the smaller pits on the cap surface, and the absence of granules on the stipe.

== Habitat and distribution ==
Morchella deqinensis is known only from China, where it fruits on the ground in coniferous and mixed forests at an elevation of 2,800–3,200 m (9,200–10,500 ft). The type collection was made in April.
