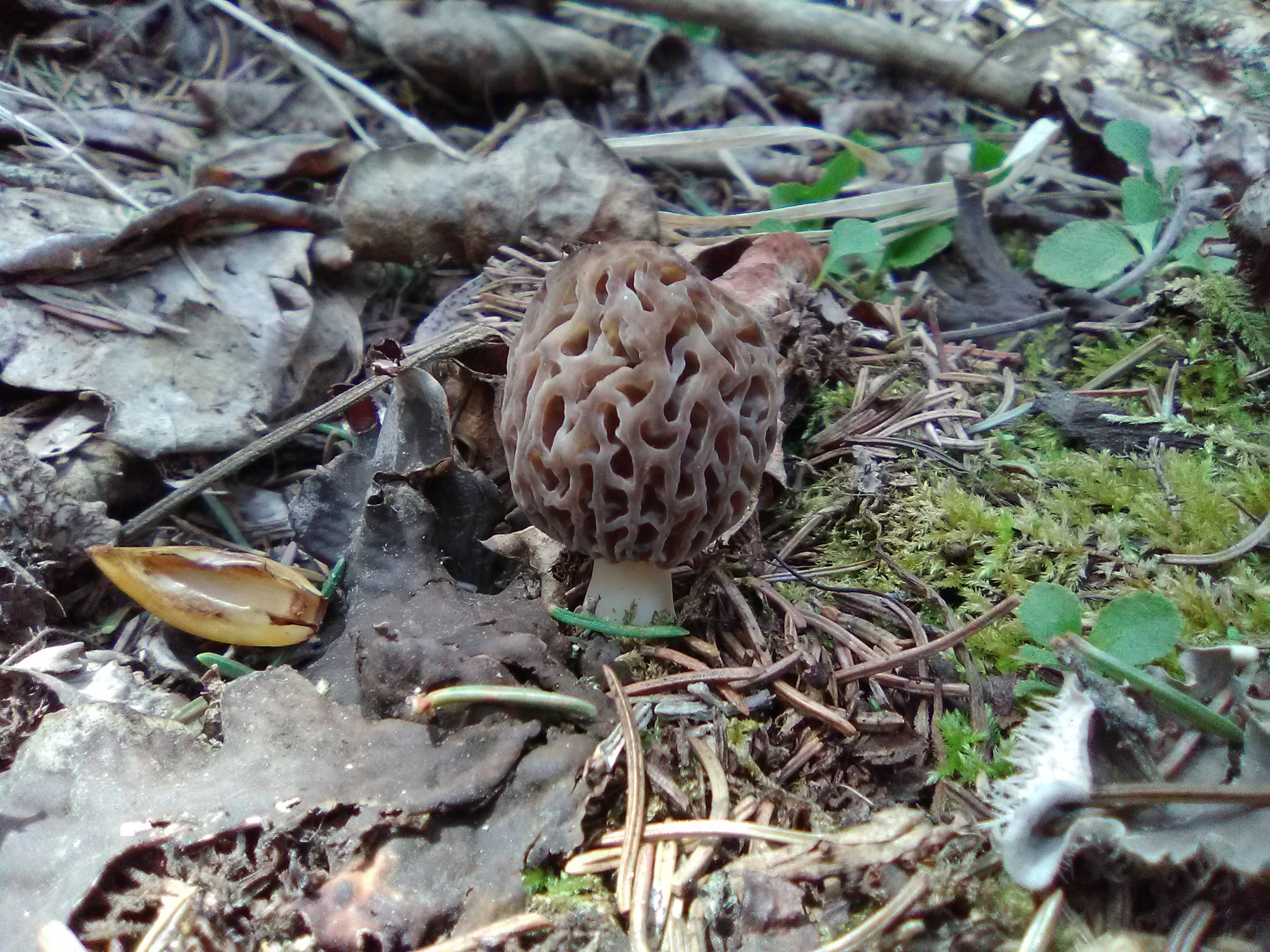

Scientific classification
- Domain: Eukaryota
- Kingdom: Fungi
- Division: Ascomycota
- Class: Pezizomycetes
- Order: Pezizales
- Family: Morchellaceae
- Genus: Morchella
- Species: M. pulchella

Binomial name
- Morchella pulchella Clowez & Franç.Petit (2012)

= Morchella pulchella =

Species of fungus

Morchella pulchella is a species of fungus in the family Morchellaceae that was described as new to science in 2012. It is found in France, where it grows on calcareous soil under Buddleja davidii.
