= Morchella mediterraneensis =

Scientific classification
- Kingdom: Fungi
- Division: Ascomycota
- Class: Pezizomycetes
- Order: Pezizales
- Family: Morchellaceae
- Genus: Morchella
- Species: M. mediterraneensis

Binomial name
- Morchella mediterraneensis Taşkın, Büyükalaca & Doğan, 2016

Species of fungus

Morchella mediterraneensis is a species of true morel, classified under the family Morchellaceae. First described in 2016, it belongs to the elata subclade (Morchella sect. Distantes). The species is notable for its distribution in Mediterranean regions, where it is one of the most common morel species.

== Taxonomy and naming ==
The species was described by Taşkın, Büyükalaca, and Doğan in 2016 based on its morphological and molecular characteristics. The specific epithet mediterraneensis reflects one of its prevalence is in the Mediterranean biogeographical zone.

== Description ==
The ascocarps are medium-sized, ranging from 25 to 60 mm (1.0 to 2.4 in) in height. The pileus is hollow, conical, and features a deep, narrow sulcus where it attaches to the stipe. The ridges are dark violet to black, while the pits are light gray to olive gray with bluish tinges when young, maturing to a honey-brown to golden-brown hue. The stipe is hollow and often constricted at the base, becoming cream-white to light honey-brown with age.

Spores are elliptical to oblong, measuring 20–24 × 11.2–13.8 μm, with faint wrinkling visible under scanning electron microscopy. Paraphyses are 2–4-septate, cylindrical, or clavate, while acroparaphyses are lanceolate to clavate with thickened walls.

== Habitat and distribution ==
Morchella mediterraneensis is found primarily in Mediterranean regions but has been observed in areas extending to Spain and Greece. In Turkey, it grows under various conifers, including Pinus brutia, P. nigra, Cedrus libani, Juniperus excelsa, and Abies cilicica. It occurs at elevations ranging from 1,000 to 1,700 m (3,300 to 5,600 ft).

== Phylogenetics ==
Molecular phylogenetics studies have shown that Morchella mediterraneensis is closely related to Morchella snyderi, a species endemic to western North America. Despite their similar morphology, the two species are distinct, with the former having smaller spores and greenish-bluish tinges in young specimens.

== Ecology ==
This species grows in symbiosis with various trees in mixed forests. It is commonly collected in Turkey and represents 83 of the 491 Morchella collections made in the country as of the study.
