= Morchella meiliensis =

Scientific classification
- Domain: Eukaryota
- Kingdom: Fungi
- Division: Ascomycota
- Class: Pezizomycetes
- Order: Pezizales
- Family: Morchellaceae
- Genus: Morchella
- Species: M. meiliensis

Binomial name
- Morchella meiliensis Y.C.Zhao, Shu H.Li, H.M.Chai & M.H.Zhong (2006)

Species of fungus

Morchella meiliensis is a species of fungus in the family Morchellaceae native to China.

== Taxonomy ==
The species was described as new to science in 2006. The specific epithet meiliensis refers to Meili Snow Mountain in Yunnan, where the type specimen was collected.

== Description ==
The fruit bodies are 6–8.5 cm (2.4–3.3 in) with a conical cap measuring 3.5–4.8 cm (1.4–1.9 in) tall by 1.2–2.0 cm (0.5–0.8 in) wide. The surface has vertically arranged ridges that are dark brown to black in colour, while the rectangular to quadrangular pits between the ridges are merulioid (wrinkled with low, uneven ridges) and yellowish in colour. The flesh is thin, and lacks any distinctive taste or odour. The cylindrical stipe measures 2.3–3.5 cm (0.9–1.4 in) tall by 0.8–2 cm (0.3–0.8 in) thick. Initially whitish, it turns yellowish with a waxy sheen when dry.

In deposit, ascospores are smooth, ellipsoid, hyaline (translucent), and measure 4.7–5.1 by 5.2–5.7 μm. They are thin-walled and contain oil droplets. Asci (spore-bearing cells) are eight-spored, cylindrical, and hyaline, and have dimensions of 5.2–5.9 μm long by 91–94 μm long. The paraphyses are dark, club-shaped, and measure 4.2–5.2 by 40–65 μm.

=== Similar species ===
Morchella conica and M. angusticeps are similar in appearance to M. meiliensis, but the latter species can be distinguished by more lightly coloured ridges on the cap surface, the merulioid texture of the pits, and microscopically by the club-shaped paraphyses.

== Habitat and distribution ==
Morchella meiliensis fruits on the ground in deciduous or mixed forests. It is known from Deqin County, Yunnan Province in China, where it grows at elevations of 2,800–3,500 metres (9,200–11,500 ft).
