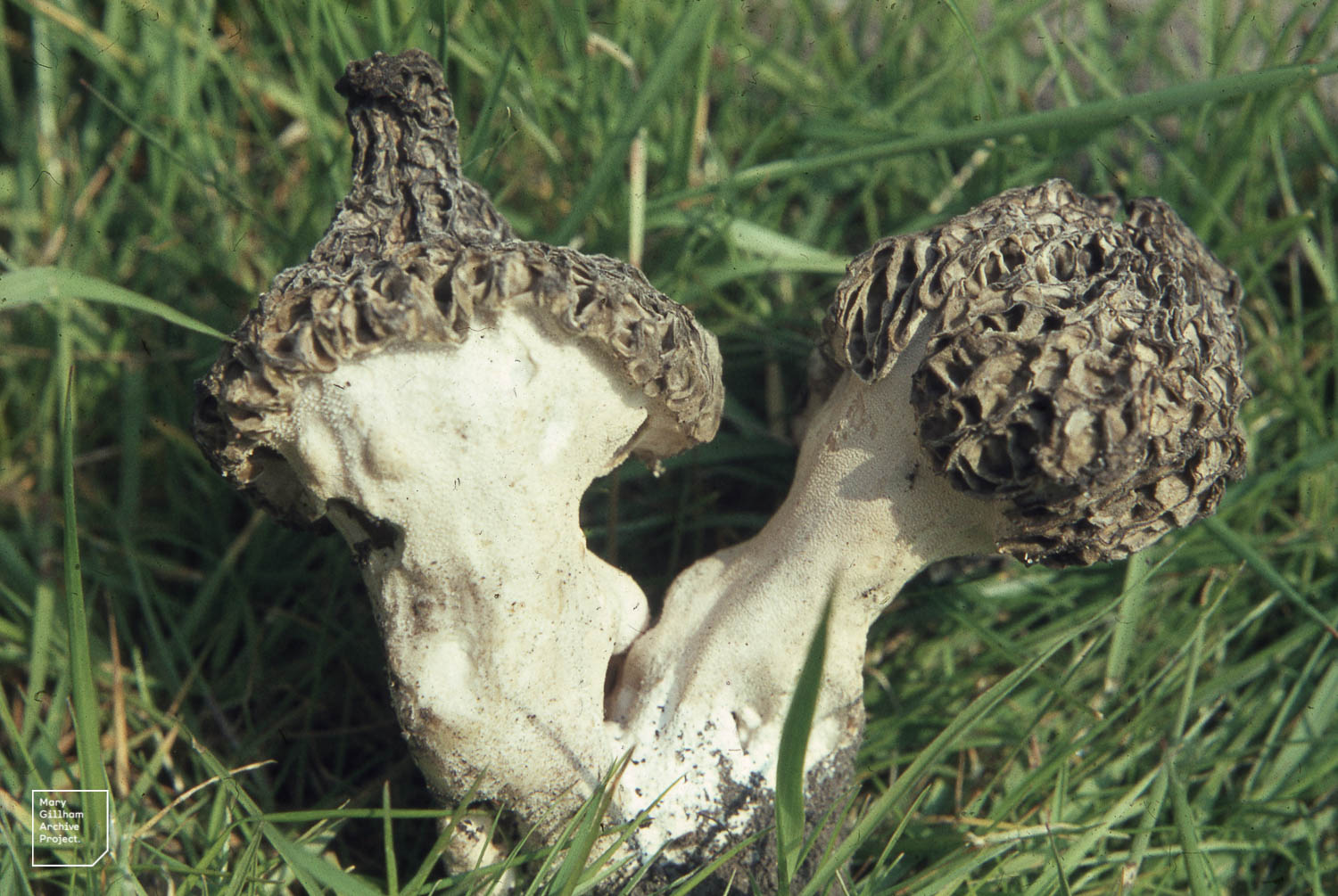

Scientific classification
- Domain: Eukaryota
- Kingdom: Fungi
- Division: Ascomycota
- Class: Pezizomycetes
- Order: Pezizales
- Family: Morchellaceae
- Genus: Morchella
- Species: M. vulgaris

Binomial name
- Morchella vulgaris (Pers.) Gray (1821)

= Morchella vulgaris =

Species of fungus

Morchella vulgaris is a widespread fungus of the family Morchellaceae (Ascomycota). It was originally described in 1801 as a form of the common yellow morel (Morchella esculenta) by mycologist Christiaan Hendrik Persoon, but was later recombined as a distinct species by Samuel Gray.

Owing to its high morphological plasticity, its taxonomical status had long been in flux, sometimes treated as a variety of, or conspecific to Morchella esculenta, while at the same time several forms and varieties of M. vulgaris itself have been described. An extensive phylogenetic and nomenclatural study by Richard and colleagues in 2014, confirmed the status of Morchella vulgaris as a distinct species, and resolved several of its synonymities.

This species is characterised by the predominantly grey colours of its cap and "blistered", highly irregular appearance of its ridges and pits.

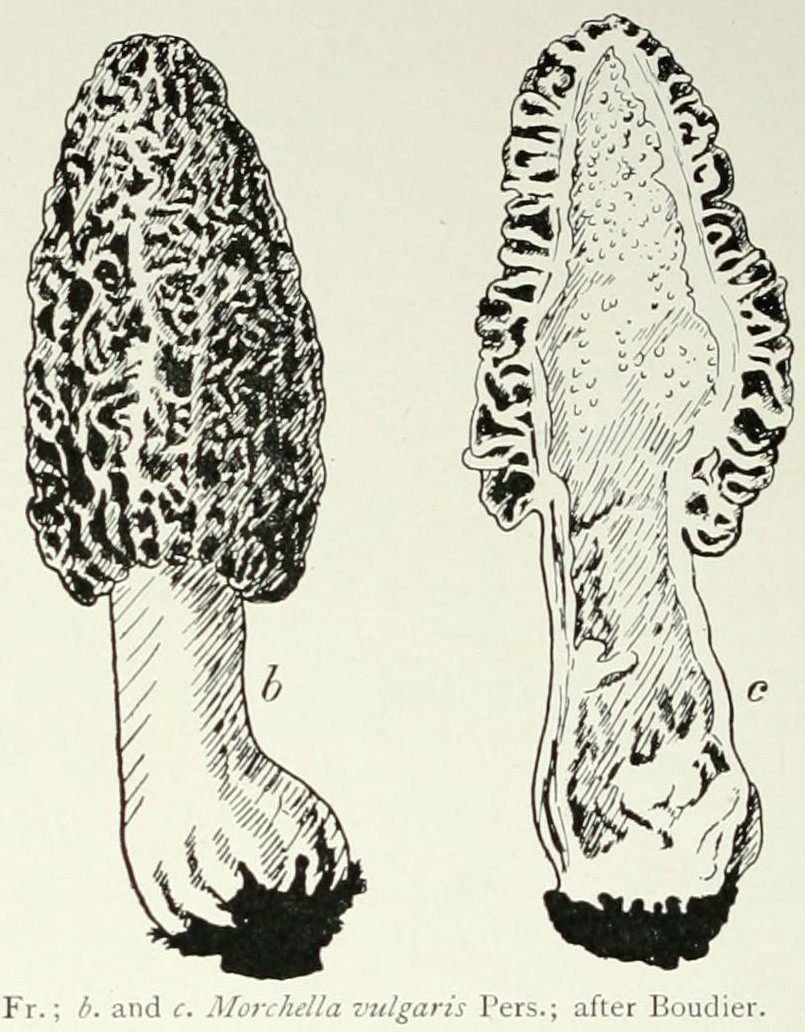
Morchella vulgaris
