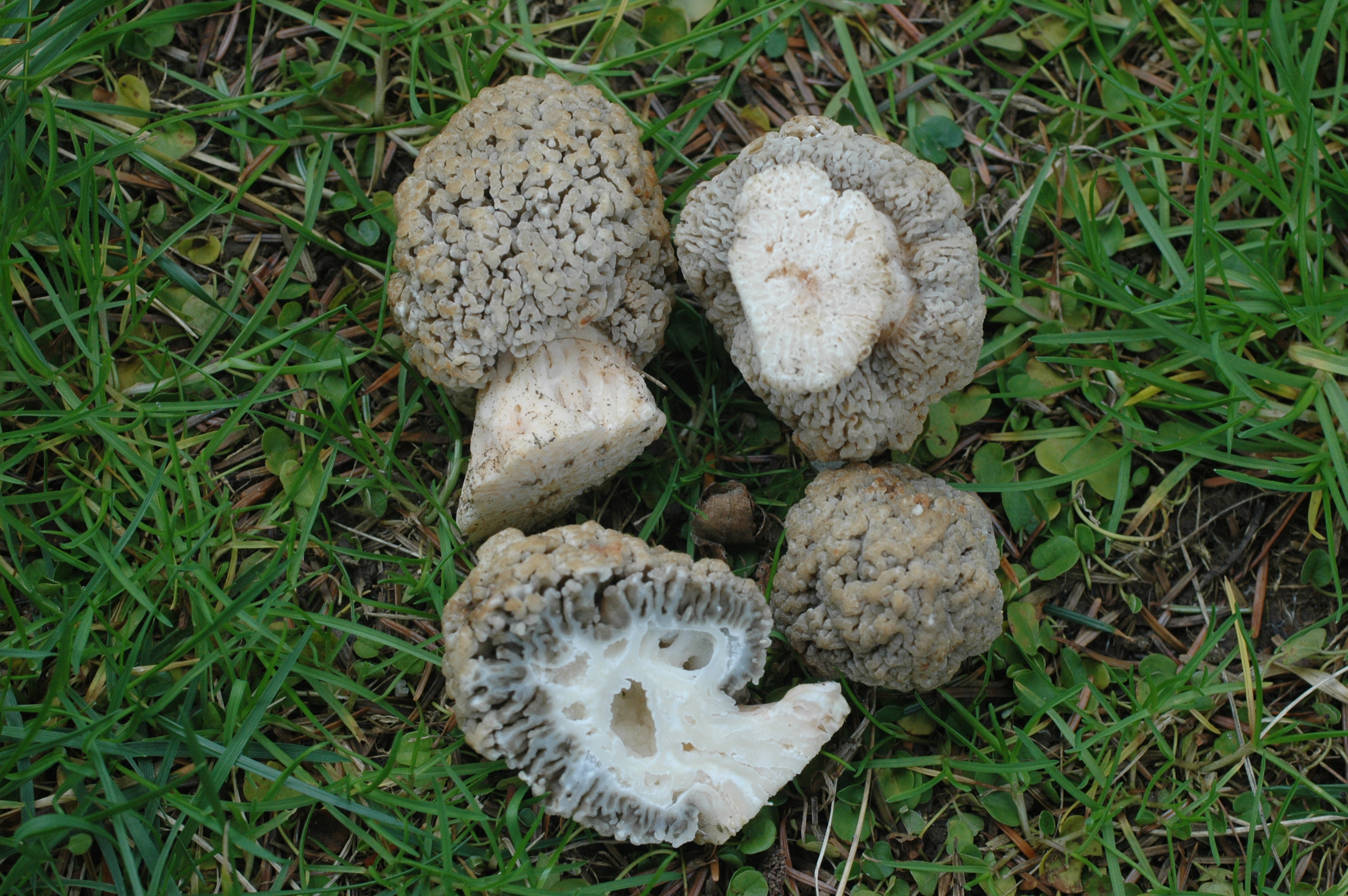

Scientific classification
- Domain: Eukaryota
- Kingdom: Fungi
- Division: Ascomycota
- Class: Pezizomycetes
- Order: Pezizales
- Family: Morchellaceae
- Genus: Morchella
- Species: M. spongiola

Binomial name
- Morchella spongiola Boud. (1897)

= Morchella spongiola =

Species of fungus

Morchella spongiola is a species of fungus in the family Morchellaceae. It was first described scientifically by Jean Louis Émile Boudier in 1897.
