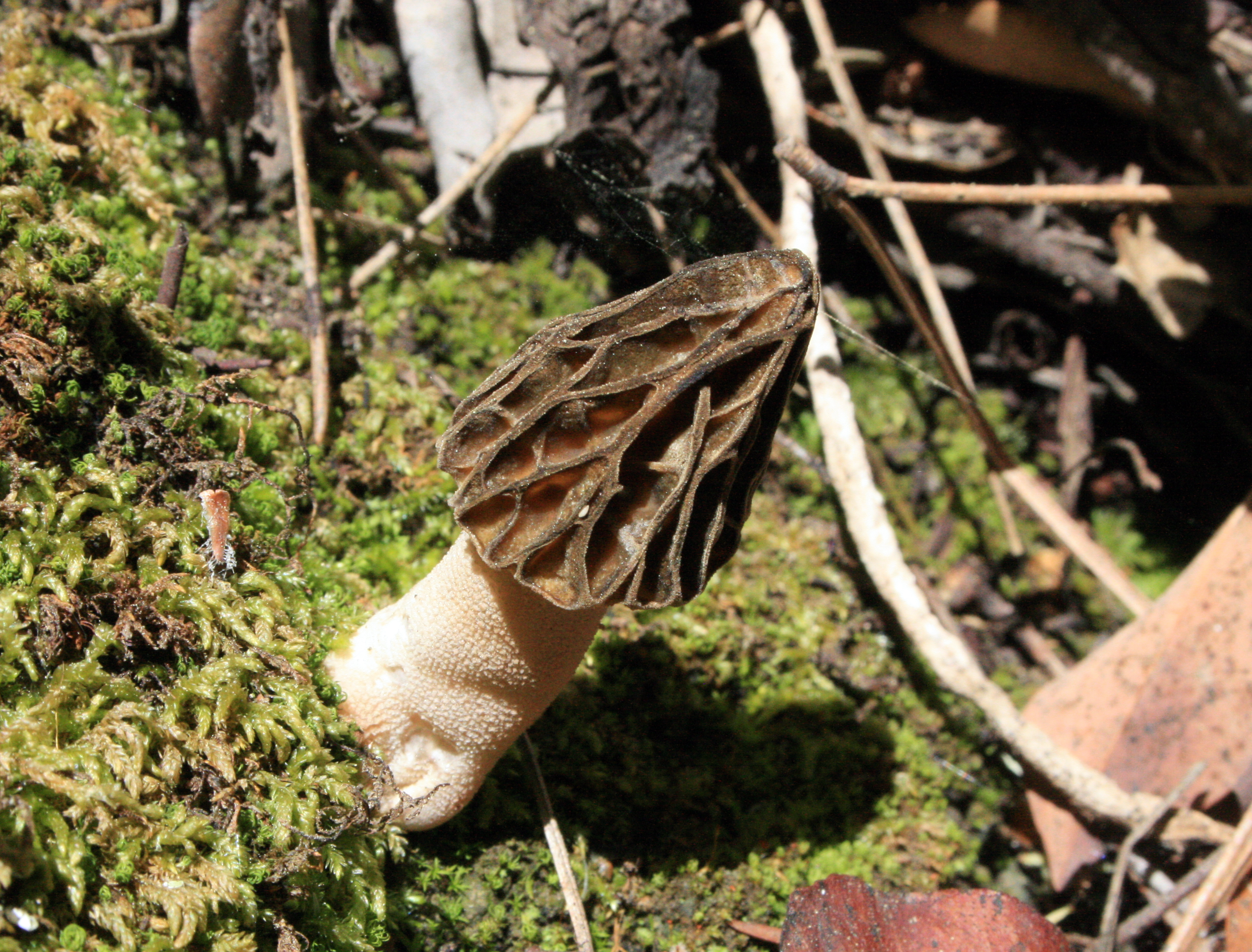

Scientific classification
- Kingdom: Fungi
- Division: Ascomycota
- Class: Pezizomycetes
- Order: Pezizales
- Family: Morchellaceae
- Genus: Morchella
- Species: M. disparilis

Binomial name
- Morchella disparilis Loizides & P.-A. Moreau (2016)

= Morchella disparilis =

Species of fungus

Morchella disparilis is an Ascomycete fungus in the family Morchellaceae. Described as new to science in 2016, M. disparilis appears to be confined to the Mediterranean basin and is so far known from Cyprus, Greece and Spain. Its most striking feature is the exceptionally deep sinus (the bent at the attachment of the cap with the stem), intermediate in depth between half-free morels of the Morchella semilibera clade and typical Distantes species.

== Taxonomy and phylogeny ==
Morchella disparilis was described as a new species to science in 2016 by Loizides and colleagues, in an elaborate phylogenetic and morphological study of the genus Morchella from the island of Cyprus, in which Morchella arbutiphila was also newly described. Because the species remained completely unknown until then and had not been detected in previous phylogenetic assessments published from Turkey, France and Spain, it had not been assigned an informal "Mel" designator. Molecular analysis of nucleic acid sequences from the internal transcribed spacer (ITS), the elongation factor EF-1α, and the RNA polymerase II (rpb1, rpb2) regions, strongly supported the monophyly of M. disparilis, with sister-clade relationships to the Mel-12/13/26/27 complex and 3.6% sequence divergence from its closest genealogical relative M. deliciosa (Mel-26).

The Latin epithet of the species means "different" or "dissimilar", referring to its unusually deep sinus.

== Description ==
=== Morphology ===
The fruit bodies are small- to medium-sized with an elongated stipe in maturity. The cap is 1–3(–4) cm high × 1–2(–3) cm wide, conical with olive-brown, greenish, olive-grey, or rarely pinkish tinges and is attached to the stipe with a distinctly deep, angular sinus. The longitudinal ridges are distant, flexuous, anastomosed and interconnected by sparse secondary ridges. The pits are usually large and irregularly shaped. The stipe is 1–4(–6) × 0.8–2(–2.5) cm, more or less cylindrical or inflated at the base, whitish or sometimes with ochre tinges, furfuraceous, hollow, short at first but gradually extends to become equal or longer than the cap. Fruit bodies have a typical, rather strong morel odour.

The ascospores measure (20–)22–26(– 27) × (12–)13–17(–18) μm, are ellipsoid in shape, hyaline (translucent) and have external droplets attached to the poles. Although they appear smooth under a light microscope, when viewed in lactophenol cotton blue or under a scanning electron microscope, the spore surface is faintly creased. The asci (spore-bearing cells) measure 230– 305 × 20–25 μm, are cylindrical to clavate, hyaline, and have a simple septum at the base. The paraphyses measure 135–205 × 10–12 μm, are hyaline, irregularly cylindrical, have variably shaped tips and 1–3 septa in the lower third or at the base. The acroparaphyses measure 110–170 × 15–40 μm, are fasciculate and polymorphic, with sparse capitate elements and 1–2 septa towards the base. The stipe surface is composed of variously shaped and poorly differentiated cells, from globose to cylindrical, clavate or pyriform, measuring 55–90 × 20–40 μm.

=== Similar species ===
Because of its unusually deep sinus, Morchella disparilis can sometimes be confused with Morchella semilibera and other "half-free" morels such as M. populiphila or M. iberica. All these species however grow in different habitats, have a deeper sinus attached to the cap halfway up and generally have longer, smooth stipes.

Morchella arbutiphila, another species described from Cyprus, can sometimes be found in the same habitat as M. disparilis, but produces larger fruit bodies with a shallower sinus. Microscopically, it has larger spores than M. disparilis, often approximating or exceeding 30 μm in length and longer, distinctly catenulate terminal hyphae on the stipe 125–140 μm long.

== Habitat and distribution ==
Morchella disparilis fruits in spring in the Mediterranean region and is so far known from the island of Cyprus, Greece and Spain. It is found in the thermomediterranean zone, often among typically Mediterranean vegetation such as cypress trees (Cupressus sempervirens), strawberry trees (Arbutus andrachne, A. unedo), or hawthorn (Crataegus azarolus).
