= METTL13 =

Protein-coding gene in humans

Identifiers
- Aliases: METTL13, DFNB26M, DFNM1, methyltransferase like 13, DFNB26, CGI-01, EEF1AKNMT, KIAA0859, 5630401D24Rik, eEF1A lysine and N-terminal methyltransferase, feat, methyltransferase 13, eEF1A lysine and N-terminal methyltransferase
- External IDs: OMIM: 617987; MGI: 1918699; GeneCards: METTL13

Gene location (Human)
Chr.	Chromosome 1 (human)
Band	1q24.3	Start	171,781,660 bp
Band	1q24.3	End	171,814,023 bp

Gene location (Mouse)
Chr.	Chromosome 1 (mouse)
Band	1|1 H2.1	Start	162,359,696 bp
Band	1|1 H2.1	End	162,376,120 bp
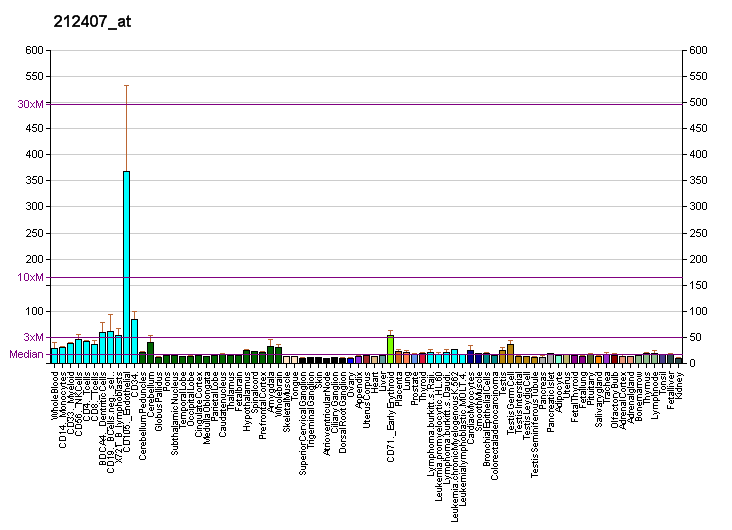

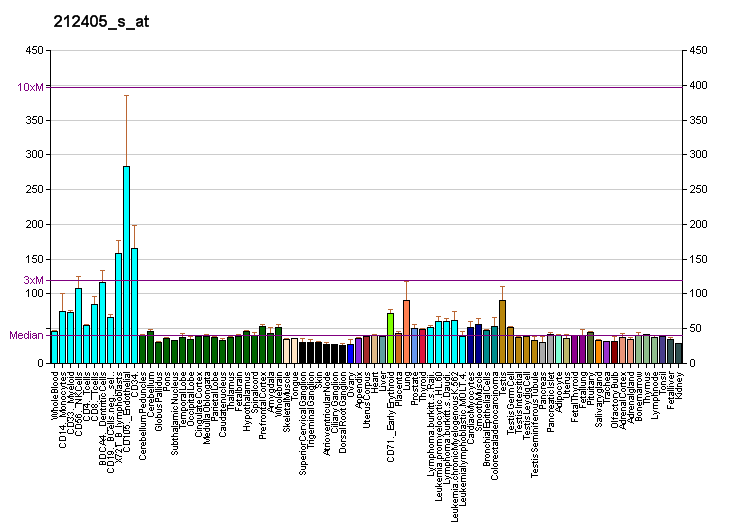

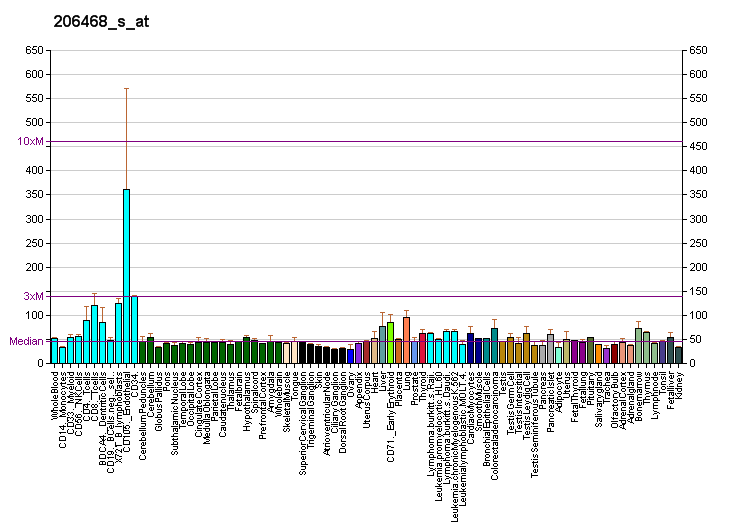
RNA expression pattern
Bgee	Human / Mouse (ortholog); Top expressed in: mucosa of transverse colon; stromal cell of endometrium; islet of Langerhans; granulocyte; gonad; testicle; right testis; rectum; right adrenal gland; left testis / Top expressed in: lumbar spinal ganglion; gastrula; Paneth cell; condyle; epiblast; internal carotid artery; external carotid artery; fossa; submandibular gland; ventricular zone; More reference expression data
BioGPS	More reference expression data
Orthologs
Databases	NCBI: entry; OMA: entry
Species	Human	Mouse
Entrez	51603	71449
Ensembl	ENSG00000010165	ENSMUSG00000026694
UniProt	Q8N6R0	Q91YR5
RefSeq (mRNA)	NM_001007239; NM_014955; NM_015935	NM_144877
RefSeq (protein)	NP_001007240; NP_055770; NP_057019	NP_659126
Location (UCSC)	Chr 1: 171.78 – 171.81 Mb	Chr 1: 162.36 – 162.38 Mb
PubMed search
- Wikidata
View/Edit Human	View/Edit Mouse

eEF1A lysine and N-terminal methyltransferase is an enzyme that in humans is encoded by the METTL13 gene. The METTL13 protein is involved in regulating messenger RNA translation through methylation. In particular it methylates EEF1A1 and EEF1A2 at the residue ‘Gly-2’, and dimethylates them at ‘Lys-55’.
