= UBALD1 =

Human Gene/Protein

Identifiers
- Aliases: UBALD1, FAM100A, PP11303, UBA like domain containing 1
- External IDs: MGI: 1916255; HomoloGene: 17055; GeneCards: UBALD1; OMA:UBALD1 - orthologs

Gene location (Mouse)
Chr.	Chromosome 16 (mouse)
Band	16|16 A1	Start	4,692,642 bp
Band	16|16 A1	End	4,698,179 bp
RNA expression pattern
Bgee	Human / Mouse (ortholog); Top expressed in: right lobe of liver; bone marrow cell; gastrocnemius muscle; cingulate gyrus; Brodmann area 9; prefrontal cortex; body of stomach; left uterine tube; gastric mucosa; amygdala / Top expressed in: primary visual cortex; superior frontal gyrus; muscle of thigh; dentate gyrus of hippocampal formation granule cell; lip; granulocyte; cerebellar cortex; yolk sac; embryo; embryo; More reference expression data
BioGPS	n/a
Orthologs
Species	Human	Mouse
Entrez	124402	207740
Ensembl	n/a	ENSMUSG00000039568
UniProt	Q8TB05	Q6P3B2
RefSeq (mRNA)	NM_145253; NM_001330467	NM_145359
RefSeq (protein)	NP_001317396; NP_660296	NP_663334
Location (UCSC)	n/a	Chr 16: 4.69 – 4.7 Mb
PubMed search
- Wikidata
View/Edit Human	View/Edit Mouse

UBALD1 (ubiquitin-associated like domain containing 1) is a protein encoded by the UBALD1 gene, located on chromosome 16 in humans. UBALD1 has high ubiquitous tissue expression and localizes in the nucleus and cytoplasm. UBALD1 is conserved in animals, including invertebrates. An alias for UBALD1 is FAM100A.

== Gene ==
The human UBALD1 gene is located on the minus strand of chromosome 16 at cytogenetic location 16p13.3. The gene contains three exons and two introns, with a total gene length of 6,145 base pairs.

== Transcripts ==
There are three isoforms of UBALD1 in humans, all of which contain three exons. UBALD1 isoform 1 has a mRNA sequence of 1,374 nucleotides and encodes the longest protein. Isoform 2 differs with an exclusion of 75 nucleotides at the start of exon 3, and isoform 3 differs with an insertion of 185 nucleotides at the end of exon 1.

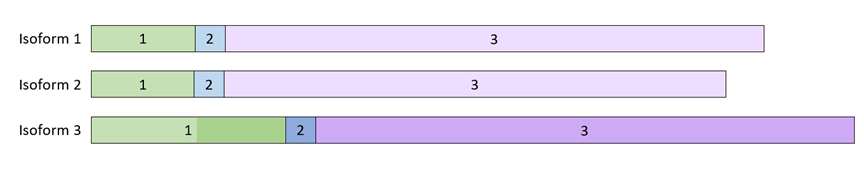
Human UBALD1 Isoforms

Human UBALD1 isoforms
Transcript Variant	mRNA length	Exon 1 length	Exon 2 length	Exon 3 length	Protein Isoform	Protein Length (AA)
1 (NM_145253.3)	1374	211	62	1099	1 (NP_660296.1)	177
2 (NM_001330467.2)	1299	211	62	1024	2 (NP_001317396.1)	152
3 (NM_001411032.1)	1559	396	62	1099	3 (NP_001397961.1)	122

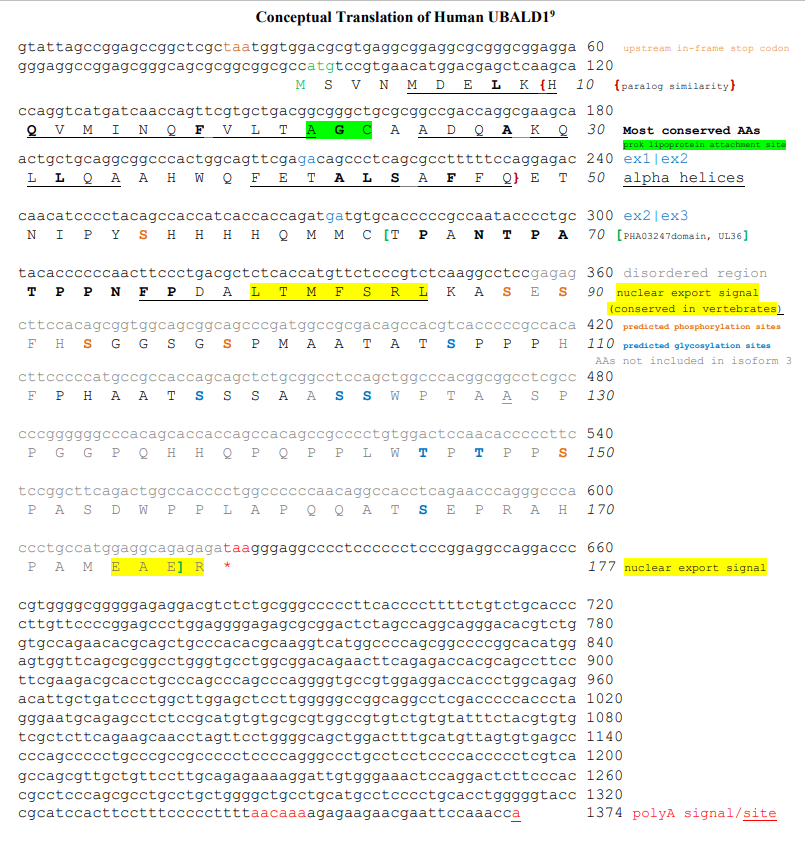
Conceptual Translation of Human UBALD1

== Protein ==
=== Isoforms ===
UBALD1 isoform 1 encodes the longest protein that consists of 177 amino acids. The protein sequence from isoform 2 is 85.9% identical to isoform 1. Isoform 2 contains an exclusion of 25 amino acids in exon 3 and lacks the PHA03247 domain. Isoform 3 greatly differs from isoform 1 and 2, being 35.6% identical to isoform 1. Isoform 3 contains 122 amino acids and an inclusion at exon 1, causing a frameshift of codons and earlier occurrence of its stop codon. Isoform 3 also lacks the PHA03247 domain.

=== Properties and domains ===
The protein encoded by UBALD1 isoform 1 has a predicted isoelectric point of 6.13 and a molecular weight 19.0 kDa. UBALD1 composition is rich in alanine and proline, and contains multiple duplets/triplets of these residues. Proline residues and multiplets are highly conserved, specifically within the PHA03247 domain. The protein contains one domain, PHA03247, or large tegument protein UL36 domain. Tegument protein UL36 is the largest tegument protein found in herpes simplex virus 1, and contains deubiquitinating activity.

=== Structure ===
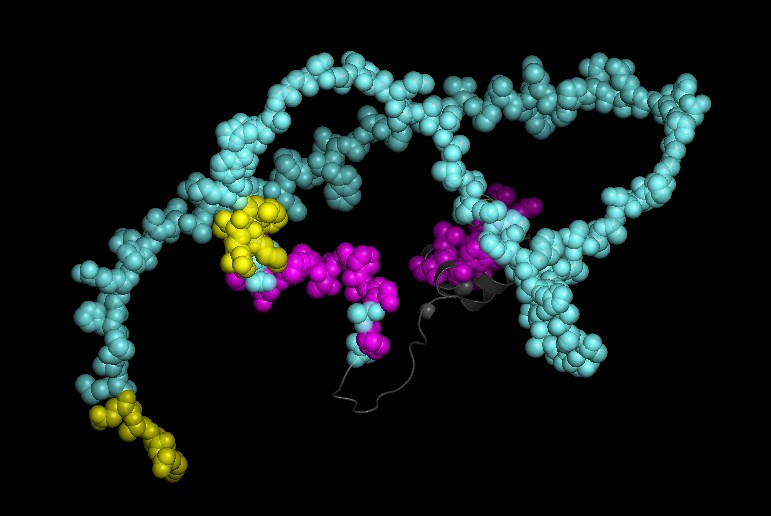
Tertiary structure of human UBALD1

The UBALD1 protein secondary structure consists of mostly coils and four short alpha helical regions (positions 5-22, 25–46, 76–83, and 170–173). Its tertiary structure is subsequently coiled and globular-like.

== Regulation ==
=== Gene Level Expression ===
UBALD1 is a highly expressed gene, 1.4x more expressed than the average gene. UBALD1 has ubiquitous expression, with its highest levels in the placenta, skeletal muscle, liver, and brain. Within the brain, UBALD1 expression is highest in the hippocampal formation and olfactory regions

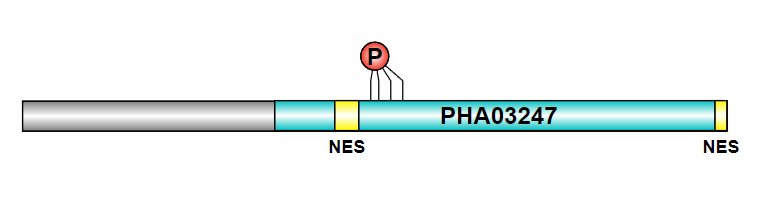
UBALD1 protein schematic including PHA03247 tegument domain, nuclear export signals, and phosphorylation sites

=== Protein level regulation ===
UBALD1 protein is predicted to localize in the nucleus and cytoplasm. A nuclear export signal is located moderately at positions 79-85 and strongly at positions 174–177. UBALD1 has many predicted phosphorylation and glycosylation sites, with known phosphorylation sites at S88, S90, S93, and S96.

== Evolutionary history ==
=== Orthologs ===
The ortholog space for UBALD1 is large, with its most distant orthologs diverging 694 million years ago in invertebrates. The orthologs include most vertebrates, such as mammals, birds, reptiles, amphibians, fishes, as well as some invertebrates, such as arthropods, cnidaria, mollusks, echinoderms, and nematodes. There are no orthologs in fungi, plants, or bacteria. Closely related orthologs, including mammals, birds, and reptiles, range 67-92% sequence similarity. Moderately related orthologs, including amphibians and fishes, range sequence 55-75% similarity. Distantly related orthologs, including invertebrates, range 29-50% sequence similarity.

UBALD1 Orthologs
Taxonomic group	Genus and species	Common name	Date of Divergence (MYA)	Sequence length (AA) ! !Sequence similarity %	Accession number	
Mammals	Homo sapiens	human	0	177	100	NP_660296.1
Mammals	Mus musculus	mouse	87	176	92.1	NP_663334.1
Mammals	Phascolarctos cinereus	koala	160	174	80.6	XP_020834285.1
Aves	Gallus gallus	chicken	319	162	76.3	XP_015150132.1
Aves	Strigops habroptila	owl parrot	319	162	74.6	XP_030340656.1
Reptiles	Chrysemys picta bellii	painted turtle	319	165	76.3	XP_005312202.1
Reptiles	Varanus komodoensis	komodo dragon	319	166	67.6	XP_044289341.1
Amphibians	Geotrypetes seraphini	gaboon caecilian	353	161	70.4	XP_033770542.1
Amphibians	Bufo bufo	common toad	353	142	65.4	XP_040297017.1
Fishes	Danio rerio	zebra fish	431	155	68.0	NP_001002488.1
Fishes	Petromyzon marinus	sea lamprey	599	179	64.7	XP_032830618.1
Invertebrates	Styela clava	tunicates	603	111	42.9	XP_039256608.1
Invertebrates	Strongylocentrotus purpuratus	purple sea urchin	619	183	36.2	XP_785714.2
Invertebrates	Trichoplax sp. H2	trichoplax	661	94	39.5	RDD43865.1
Invertebrates	Vanessa tameamea	kamehameha butterfly	694	151	50.5	XP_026499211.1
Invertebrates	Gigantopelta aegis	deep sea snail	694	128	42.1	XP_041363274.1
Invertebrates	Mercenaria mercenaria	hard clam	694	122	42.5	XP_045214261.1

=== Paralogs ===
The human UBALD1 protein has one paralog, UBALD2, present in vertebrates but not invertebrates. They are similar, with a 63.1% sequence identity and 70.9% sequence similarity. UBALD2 protein has a length of 164 amino acids, predicted isoelectric point of 6.78 and molecular weight of 17.7 kDa.

The UL36 tegument protein domain of UBALD1 is partially conserved in the UBALD2 paralog. UBALD1 has monoallelic expression, where as UBALD2 has biallelic expression.

=== Conservation ===
Exon 1 and the beginning of exon 3 (positions 64–79), are highly conserved among strict and distant orthologs. Specifically, the proline residues in exon 3 (P65, P69, P72, P73, P76) are strongly conserved.

== Interacting proteins ==
UBALD1 has physical association with proteins MED8, found in the nucleus, and RPL9, found in the cytoplasm. UBALD1 also associates with EPRS and EEF1E1, both of which are known to interact and be involved in the aminoacyl-tRNA synthetase multienzyme complex.

== Clinical Significance ==
UBALD1 has been associated with various cancer types, and was identified as a significantly elevated autoantibody in lymphoma patients. Hypomethylation of the UBALD1 promoter region was associated with cell-cell adhesion, B cell activation, and lymphocyte activation, is a potential biomarker for predicting primary resistance to platinum-based chemotherapeutics. UBALD1 hypomethylation is also associated with gender incongruence. UBALD1 has significant CpG hypomethylation in trans women assigned male at birth before receiving gender-affirming hormone therapy, compared to cis men assigned male at birth.
