= Porricondyla media =

Scientific classification
- Domain: Eukaryota
- Kingdom: Animalia
- Phylum: Arthropoda
- Class: Insecta
- Order: Diptera
- Family: Cecidomyiidae
- Subfamily: Porricondylinae
- Tribe: Porricondylini
- Genus: Porricondyla
- Species: P. media

Binomial name
- Porricondyla media Spungis, 1981

Species of fly

Porricondyla media is a species of fly in the family Cecidomyiidae. It can breed in the fruit bodies of the false morel, Verpa bohemica.
