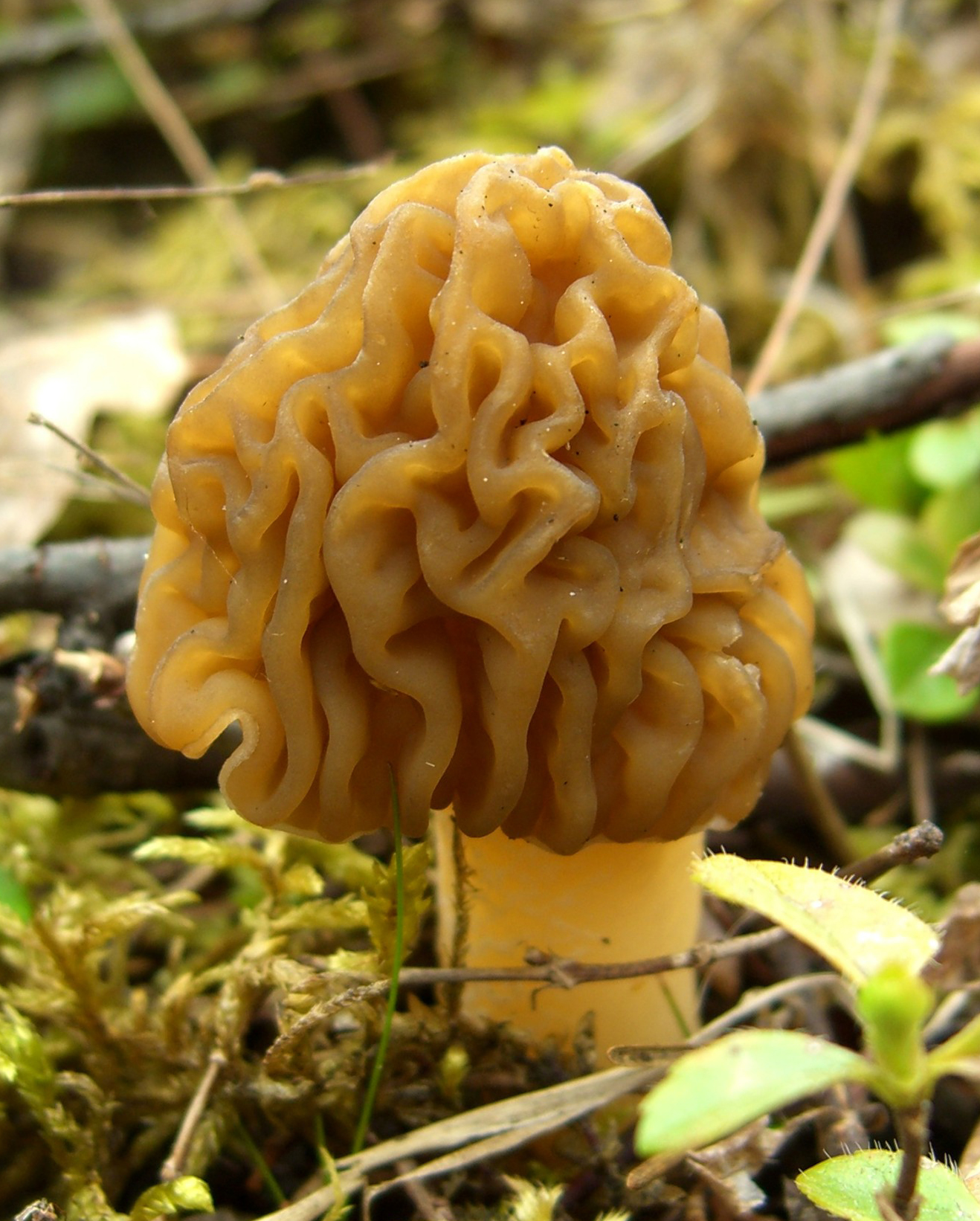

Scientific classification
- Kingdom: Fungi
- Division: Ascomycota
- Class: Pezizomycetes
- Order: Pezizales
- Family: Morchellaceae
- Genus: Verpa
- Species: V. bohemica

Binomial name
- Verpa bohemica (Krombh.) J.Schröt. (1893)

Synonyms
- Morchella bohemica Krombh. (1828); Ptychoverpa bohemica (Krombh.) Boud. (1907)

= Verpa bohemica =

Species of fungus

Verpa bohemica
- Mycological characteristics
- Smooth hymenium
- Cap is convex
- Hymenium attachment is not applicable
- Stipe is bare
- Spore print is yellow
- Ecology is saprotrophic
- Edibility is edible but not recommended

Verpa bohemica is a species of fungus in the family Morchellaceae. The synonym Ptychoverpa bohemica is often used by European mycologists and it is commonly known as the early morel or the wrinkled thimble-cap.

The mushroom has a pale yellow or brown thimble-shaped cap—2 to 4 cm (3/4 to 1 5/8 in) in diameter by 2 to 5 cm (3/4 to 2 in) long—that has a surface wrinkled and ribbed with brain-like convolutions. A feature distinguishing the species from true morels (genus Morchella), the cap hangs free from the top of the stem, which is lighter in color, brittle, and up to 12 cm (4 3/4 in) long by 1 to 2.5 cm (3/8 to 1 in) thick. Microscopically, the mushroom is distinguished by its large spores, typically 60–80 by 15–18 μm, and the presence of only two spores per ascus.

Verpa bohemica is found in northern North America, Europe, and Asia. It fruits in early spring, growing on the ground in woods following the snowmelt, before the appearance of true morels. Although widely considered edible, if incorrectly prepared, consumption of the mushroom may lead to poisoning in susceptible individuals; symptoms include gastrointestinal upset and lack of muscular coordination.

== Taxonomy ==
The species was first described in the scientific literature by the Czech medical doctor and mycologist Julius Vincenz von Krombholz in 1828, under the name Morchella bohemica. The German naturalist Joseph Schröter transferred it to the genus Verpa in 1893. Ptychoverpa bohemica is a synonym that was published by Frenchman Jean Louis Émile Boudier in his 1907 treatise on the Discomycetes of Europe; the name is still occasionally used, especially in European publications. Boudier believed that the large, curved ascospores and the rare and short paraphyses were sufficiently distinct to warrant a new genus to contain the single species. Ptychoverpa has also been classified as a section of Verpa. The section is characterized by the presence of thick longitudinal ridges on the cap that can be simple or forked.

The species was first discovered in Canada by Alfred Brooker Klugh shortly before 1910 where it was referred to by another synonym, Morchella bispora.

=== Etymology ===
The specific epithet bohemica refers to Bohemia (now a part of the Czech Republic), where Krombholz originally collected the species. The mushroom is commonly known as the "early morel", "early false morel", or the "wrinkled thimble-cap". Ptychoverpa is derived from the Ancient Greek ptyx (genitive form ptychos), meaning "fold", layer", or "plate".

== Description ==
The cap of this fungus (known technically as an apothecium) is 2 to 4 centimetres (3/4 to 1 5/8 inches) in diameter and 2 to 5 cm (3/4 to 2 in) long, with a conical or bell shape. It is folded into longitudinal ridges that often fuse together (anastomose) in a veinlike network. The cap varies in color from yellowish brown to reddish brown, with a pale underside, is attached to the stem at the top only, with the lobed edge free. The stem is 6 to 12 cm (2 3/8 to 4 3/4 in) long and 1 to 2.5 cm (3/8 to 1 in) thick, cream-white in color, and tapering upward. Although the stem is initially loosely stuffed with cottony hyphae, it eventually becomes hollow in maturity; overall, the mushroom is rather fragile. The spore deposit is yellow, and the flesh is white.

Relative to other typical mushroom species, the spores of V. bohemica are huge, typically measuring 60–80 by 15–18 μm. They are elliptical, smooth, sometimes curved, and appear hyaline (translucent) to yellowish. The spores, which number two (more rarely three) per ascus are characteristic for this species. The smooth, elliptical asci measure 275–350 μm long by 16–23 μm wide. The British-Canadian mycologist Arthur Henry Reginald Buller determined that the asci are heliotropic—they bend toward light. As he noted, "I cut transverse sections though their pilei, examined these sections under the microscope, and at once perceived that in all the hymenial grooves and depressions the asci were curved outwards so that their opercula must have faced the strongest rays of light to which the ends of the asci has been subjected in the places where the fruit-bodies developed." This response to the stimulus of light is significant because it permits a fruit body to point and later discharge its asci towards open spaces, thus increasing the chances that the spores will be dispersed by wind. The paraphyses are thick and club-shaped, with diameters of 7–8 μm at their tips.

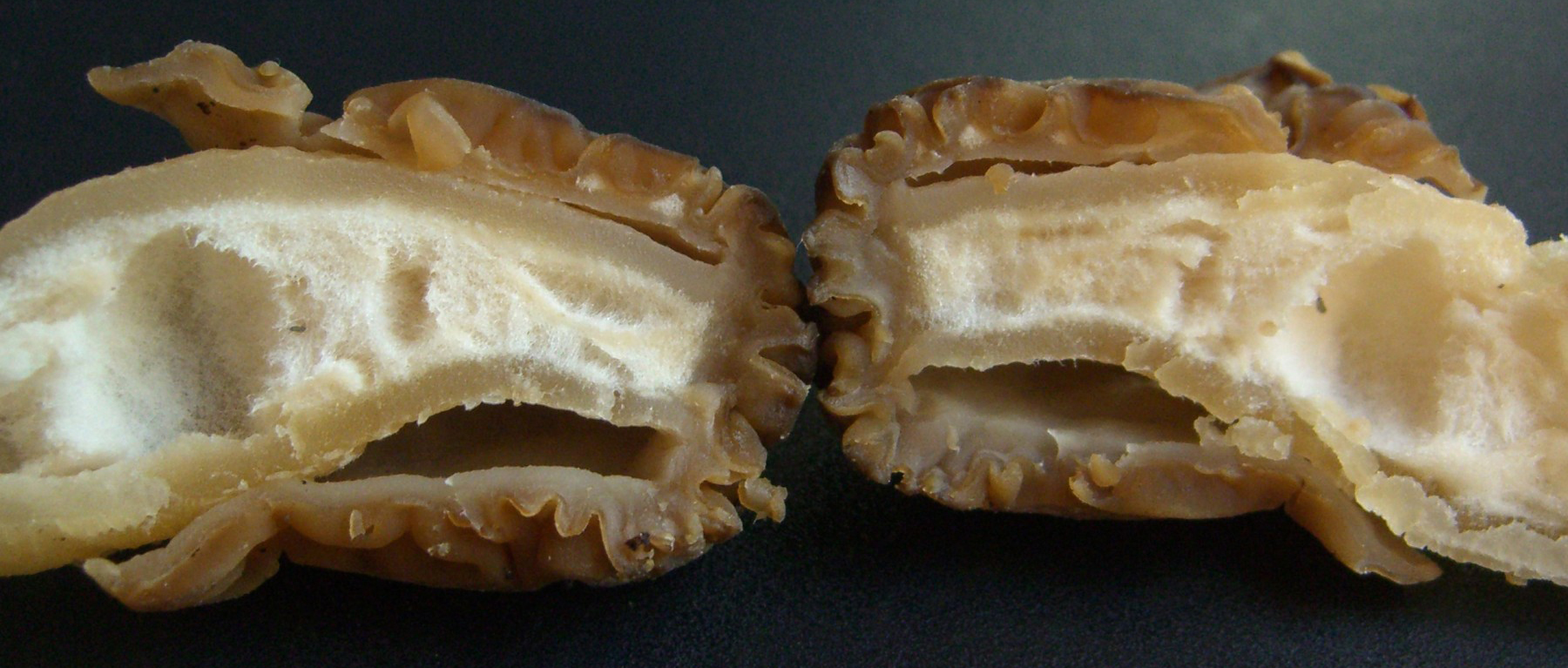
Stems of young fruit bodies are initially stuffed with soft, cottony tissue.

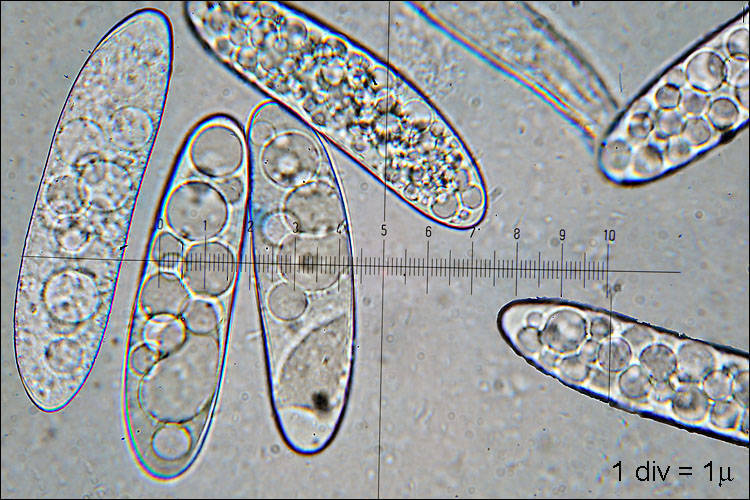
The spores are large, measuring up to 80 μm long.

=== Similar species ===
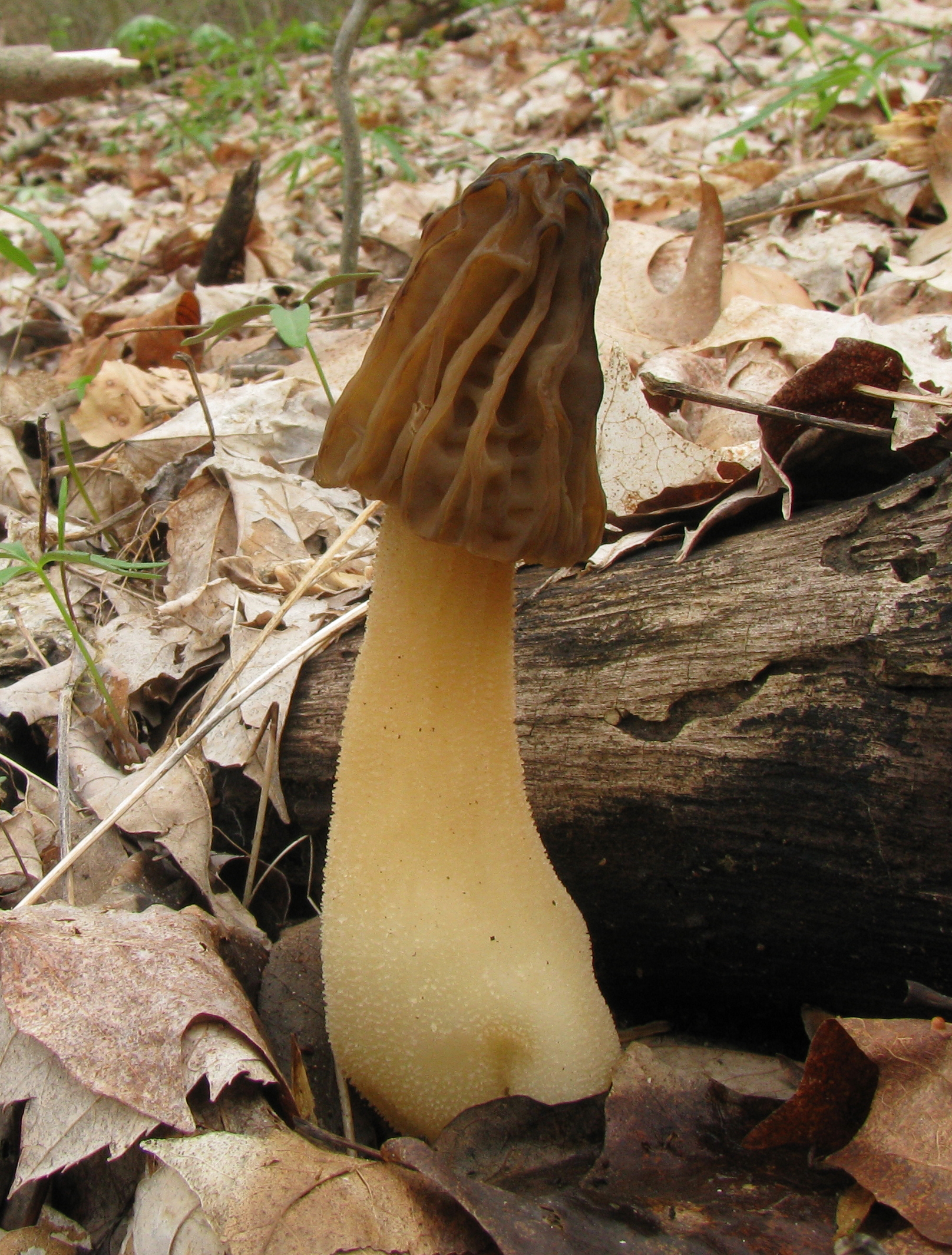
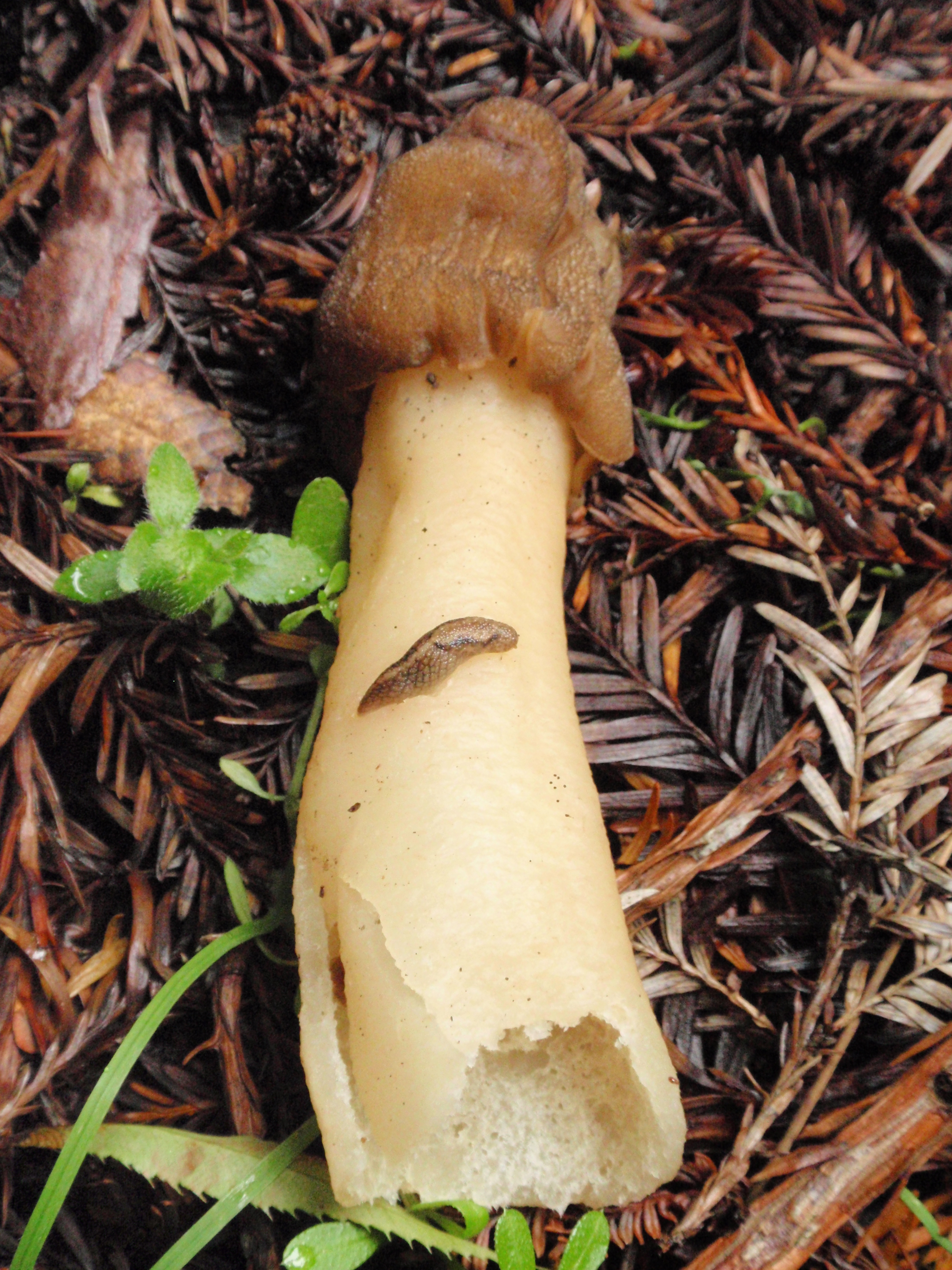
Lookalike species include the half-free morel (left) and Verpa conica (right).

The closely related Verpa conica typically has a smooth cap, but it can be wrinkled; V. conica may be distinguished microscopically by its eight-spored asci. Its North American range extends much further south than V. bohemica.

Another similar group of species are the "half-free" morels, e.g. Morchella semilibera, M. populiphila, and M. punctipes. These typically have a honeycombed cap attached to the stalk for about half of its length, and with ridges that are darker than the pits. In cross-section, the stem of M. semilibera stem is hollow, while that of V. bohemica usually has cottony wisps; M. semilibera usually has vertical perforations near the base, while V. bohemica does not.

Verpa bohemica may be reliably distinguished from all similar species by its much larger spores.

== Distribution, habitat and ecology ==
The fungus has a wide distribution throughout northern North America; its range extends south to the Great Lakes in the Midwestern United States, and south to northern California on the West Coast. In Europe, the fungus is widely distributed, and has been collected from Austria, the Czech Republic, Denmark, Finland, Germany, Norway, Poland, Russia, Romania, Slovenia, Spain, Sweden, and Ukraine. In Asia, it has been recorded from India and Turkey.

The fruit bodies of V. bohemica grow singly or scattered on the ground in woods in early spring, often before the appearance of the morel, and throughout the morel season. It is often found along riverbanks, near cottonwoods, willows and aspens, often buried in plant litter. The fungus prefers to fruit in moist areas with ample sunlight. Its minimum growth temperature is 3 °C (37 °F), with an optimum of 22 °C (72 °F), and a maximum of about 30 °C (86 °F). A study of carbon and nitrogen isotope ratios indicated that V. bohemica is saprobic, that is, obtaining nutrients from decomposing organic matter. It has been suggested, however, that the fungus is mycorrhizal for at least part of its life cycle.

A 10-year study of the distribution, time of fruiting and habitats of morel and false morel population in Iowa showed that early false morels are the first morels to fruit in the spring, appearing shortly after leaves begin to form on deciduous trees. Narrow-head morels (Morchella angusticeps) fruit next, followed by the yellow or white morels (M. esculenta), then lastly M. crassipes. The fruit bodies serve as a habitat for breeding dipterans (flies), including Porricondyla media, Pegomya geniculata, and Trichocera annulata.

== Edibility ==
Despite being sold (usually frozen) in Russia, the edibility of Verpa is debated. Although it is eaten by many, consumption of large amounts in a single sitting, or on successive days, has been reported to cause poisoning in susceptible individuals. Symptoms include gastrointestinal upset and lack of muscular coordination, similar to the effects reported by some individuals after consuming the false morel species Gyromitra esculenta. The responsible toxin in G. esculenta is gyromitrin; it was suspected that V. bohemica may be able to synthesize low levels of the toxin, but this has yet to be experimentally detected. Overconsumption of the mushroom has been reported to induce coma. There are also reports of alcohol intolerance (disulfiram-like reaction) after consumption.

According to one report, the edibility of Verpa is similar to that of Morchella. It should always be cooked thoroughly and, if being eaten for the first time, restricted to small portions to test tolerance. Some advocate only eating the caps and discarding the stems. Opinions on the flavor of the mushrooms vary, ranging from "strong but not on a par with true morels", to "pleasant", to "not distinctive".
