= Porricondyla =

Scientific classification
- Domain: Eukaryota
- Kingdom: Animalia
- Phylum: Arthropoda
- Class: Insecta
- Order: Diptera
- Family: Cecidomyiidae
- Subfamily: Porricondylinae
- Tribe: Porricondylini
- Genus: Porricondyla; Rondani, 1840

Synonyms
- Poricondyla Schiner, 1864; Porrhocondyla Agassiz, 1846

Genus of flies

Porricondyla is a genus of gall midges in the family Cecidomyiidae. There are more than 110 described species in Porricondyla, found mainly in Europe and North America.

== Species ==
These 116 species belong to the genus Porricondyla:

- Porricondyla abbreviata (Kieffer, 1913)
- Porricondyla agricolae (Marshall, 1896)
- Porricondyla albimana (Winnertz, 1853)
- Porricondyla americana (Felt, 1914)
- Porricondyla amurensis Mamaev & Zaitzev, 1996
- Porricondyla anemotis (Kieffer, 1913)
- Porricondyla antennata Felt, 1915
- Porricondyla armata Spungis, 1981 (Europe)
- Porricondyla asiatica Mamaev, 1963
- Porricondyla aurantiaca Panelius, 1965 (Europe)
- Porricondyla aurea (Marshall, 1896)
- Porricondyla auriculata (Barnes, 1928)
- Porricondyla barberi Felt, 1908
- Porricondyla bidentula Jaschhof & Jaschhof, 2020
- Porricondyla bifurcata Mamaev, 1963
- Porricondyla borealis Felt, 1907
- Porricondyla boreocola Jaschhof & Jaschhof, 2013 (Europe)
- Porricondyla carolina Felt, 1908
- Porricondyla caucasicola Mamaev & Zaitzev, 1996
- Porricondyla citrina (Kieffer, 1894)
- Porricondyla clancula Jaschhof & Jaschhof, 2013 (Europe)
- Porricondyla colpodioides Mamaev, 1963 (Europe)
- Porricondyla conferta (Skuse, 1888)
- Porricondyla consobrina Felt, 1919
- Porricondyla dietzii Felt, 1912
- Porricondyla dilatata Felt, 1908
- Porricondyla distenta (Skuse, 1888)
- Porricondyla distinguenda Mamaev, 1963 (Europe)
- Porricondyla diversicornis Jaschhof & Jaschhof, 2020
- Porricondyla elongata (Felt, 1908)
- Porricondyla ermakovi Mamaev, 2001
- Porricondyla errabunda Mamaev, 2001 (Europe)
- Porricondyla exigua (Skuse, 1888)
- Porricondyla fibyensis Jaschhof & Jaschhof, 2013 (Europe)
- Porricondyla flavescens (F.Löw, 1874) (Europe)
- Porricondyla flavida (Kieffer, 1913)
- Porricondyla fulvescens Panelius, 1965 (Europe)
- Porricondyla gemina Jaschhof & Jaschhof, 2020
- Porricondyla gibberosa (Skuse, 1888)
- Porricondyla globosa Spungis, 1981
- Porricondyla grandipennis (Skuse, 1890)
- Porricondyla hamata (Felt, 1907)
- Porricondyla hamifera Mamaev, 1963
- Porricondyla hyalinata Mamaev, 1990
- Porricondyla indica (Kieffer, 1913)
- Porricondyla juvenalis Felt, 1912
- Porricondyla lamellata Yukawa, 1971
- Porricondyla leacheana (Walker, 1856) (Europe)
- Porricondyla lineata (Kieffer, 1894)
- Porricondyla lobata (Kieffer, 1913)
- Porricondyla lobifera Mamaev & Zaitzev, 1996
- Porricondyla longipennis Spungis, 1981
- Porricondyla lutescens Spungis, 1981 (Europe)
- Porricondyla macella (Skuse, 1888)
- Porricondyla macrodon Jaschhof & Jaschhof, 2013 (Europe)
- Porricondyla magna (Marshall, 1896)
- Porricondyla magnifica (Skuse, 1888)
- Porricondyla media Spungis, 1981
- Porricondyla microcera (Kieffer, 1901)
- Porricondyla microgona Jaschhof & Jaschhof, 2013 (Europe)
- Porricondyla minor Felt, 1926
- Porricondyla minuta Chandra, 1993
- Porricondyla modesta Spungis, 1981 (Europe)
- Porricondyla montana (Marikovskii, 1958)
- Porricondyla monticola (Kieffer, 1913)
- Porricondyla neglecta Mamaev, 1965 (Europe)
- Porricondyla nervosa (Meigen, 1838)
- Porricondyla nitida Van der Wulp, 1874
- Porricondyla nocturna Kieffer
- Porricondyla oelandica Jaschhof & Jaschhof, 2013 (Europe)
- Porricondyla opipara (Skuse, 1888)
- Porricondyla ordinaria (Marshall, 1896)
- Porricondyla ottebyensis Jaschhof & Jaschhof, 2020
- Porricondyla ottenbyensis Jaschhof & Jaschhof, 2020
- Porricondyla pallescens Panelius, 1965 (Europe)
- Porricondyla pallidigenae Jaschhof & Jaschhof, 2020
- Porricondyla pallidina Gagné, 1989
- Porricondyla pallipes (Winnertz, 1853)
- Porricondyla pantaneira Garcia, Lamas & Urso-Guimarães, 2023
- Porricondyla parrishi Felt, 1915
- Porricondyla perexilis (Skuse, 1888)
- Porricondyla pergrata Mamaev, 1986
- Porricondyla petiolata Mamaev, 1986
- Porricondyla petrophila Mamaev, 1986 (Europe)
- Porricondyla peyerimhoffi (Kieffer, 1919)
- Porricondyla photophila Spungis, 1981 (Europe)
- Porricondyla porrecta Felt, 1912
- Porricondyla prayagensis Grover & Bakhshi, 1978
- Porricondyla pubescens (Walker, 1856) (Europe)
- Porricondyla quadridens Spungis, 1981
- Porricondyla quercina Felt, 1907
- Porricondyla recondita Plakidas, 2005
- Porricondyla roleks Jaschhof & Jaschhof, 2013 (Europe)
- Porricondyla rostellata Panelius, 1965 (Europe)
- Porricondyla rotundata Yukawa, 1971
- Porricondyla rufescens Panelius, 1965 (Europe)
- Porricondyla rufocinerea Panelius, 1965 (Europe)
- Porricondyla separata Yukawa, 1971
- Porricondyla serrulata Jaschhof & Jaschhof, 2013 (Europe)
- Porricondyla setosa Felt, 1914
- Porricondyla spinigera Felt, 1919
- Porricondyla srinagarensis Kashyap, 1993
- Porricondyla sulfurea (Kieffer, 1913)
- Porricondyla sylvestris Felt, 1907
- Porricondyla tenuisecta Fedotova & Sidorenko, 2005
- Porricondyla tetraschistica Mamaev, 1998 (Europe)
- Porricondyla tuckeri Felt, 1908
- Porricondyla unidentata Parnell, 1971
- Porricondyla ussuriorum Mamaev & Zaitzev, 1996
- Porricondyla varians Parnell, 1971
- Porricondyla vernalis Felt, 1912
- Porricondyla wenzeli Garcia, Lamas & Urso-Guimarães, 2023
- † Porricondyla elegantula (Meunier, 1904)
- † Porricondyla gibbosa (Meunier, 1904)
- † Porricondyla noduliformis (Meunier, 1904)
- † Porricondyla titana (Meunier, 1904)
