= EEF1A1P43 =

Pseudogene in the species Homo sapiens

Identifiers
- Aliases: EEF1A1P43, EEF1A3, eukaryotic translation elongation factor 1 alpha 1 pseudogene 43
- External IDs: GeneCards: EEF1A1P43; OMA:EEF1A1P43 - orthologs
Orthologs
Species	Human	Mouse
Entrez	1918	n/a
Ensembl	n/a	n/a
UniProt	n a	n/a
RefSeq (mRNA)	n/a	n/a
RefSeq (protein)	n/a	n/a
Location (UCSC)	n/a	n/a
PubMed search		n/a
- Wikidata
View/Edit Human

Eukaryotic translation elongation factor 1 alpha 1 pseudogene 43 (eEF1A3) is a protein that in humans is encoded by the EEF1A1P43 gene.

== See also ==
- eEF-1
