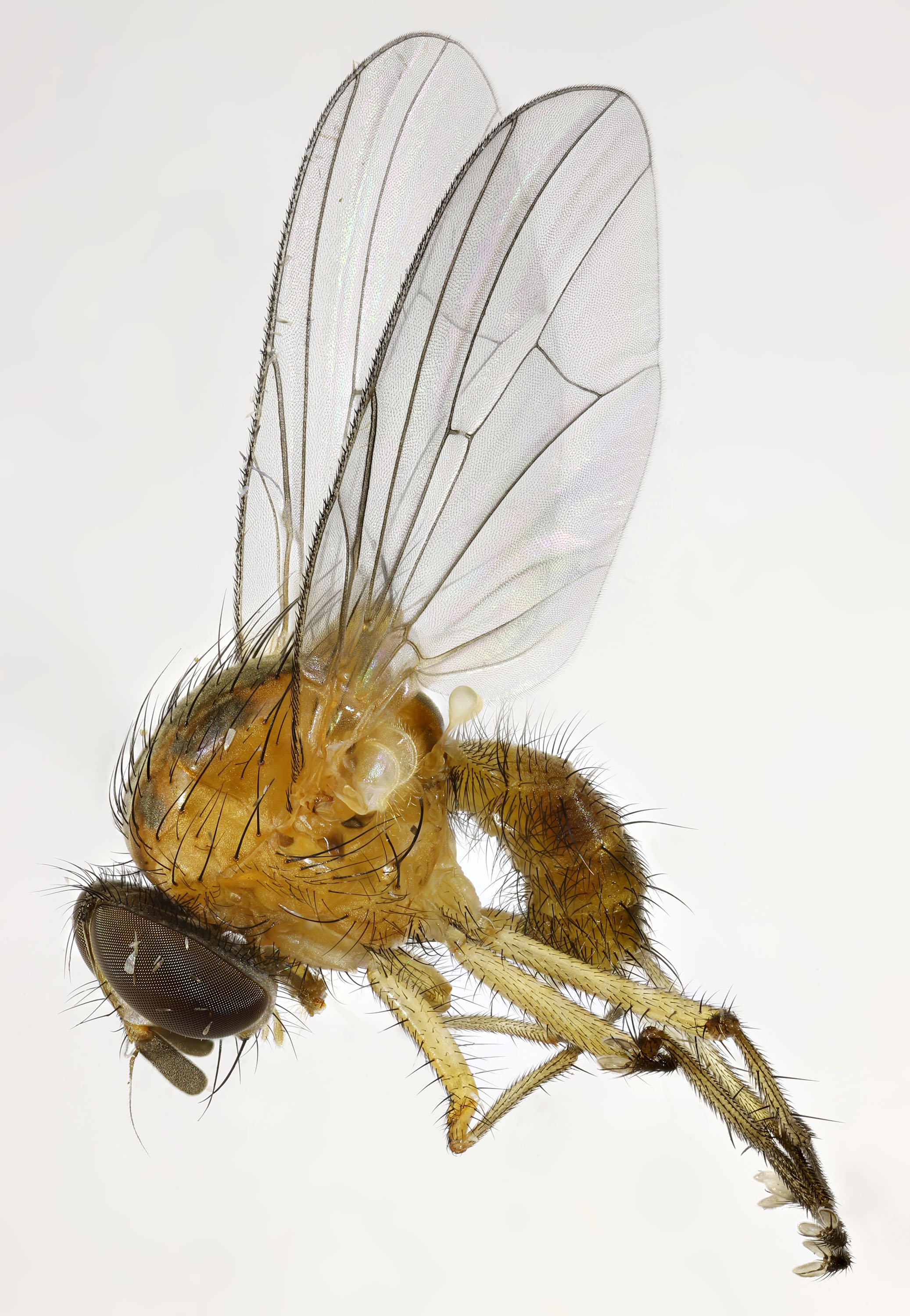
- Pegomya geniculata

Scientific classification
- Kingdom: Animalia
- Phylum: Arthropoda
- Class: Insecta
- Order: Diptera
- Family: Anthomyiidae
- Genus: Pegomya
- Species: P. geniculata

Binomial name
- Pegomya geniculata (Bouché, 1834)

Synonyms
- Anthomyia geniculata Bouche, 1834; Anthomyia univittata Roser, 1840

= Pegomya geniculata =

Species of fly

Pegomya geniculata is a species of fly in the family Anthomyiidae. It has been recorded in the United States (North Carolina), Ireland, and Switzerland. The insect is fungivorous, and uses the fruit bodies of several mushroom species to breed, such as Verpa bohemica.
