= Mir-663 microRNA precursor family =

mir-663

Identifiers
- Symbol: mir-663
- Rfam: RF00957
- miRBase family: MIPF0000462

Other data
- RNA type: microRNA
- Domain: Eukaryota;
- PDB structures: PDBe

In molecular biology mir-663 microRNA is a short RNA molecule. MicroRNAs function to regulate the expression levels of other genes by several mechanisms.

== Gastric cancer suppression ==
miR-663 has been identified as a possible suppressor of tumour growth, with its levels downregulated in human gastric cancer cell lines. Its introduction into the two human gastric cancer cell lines BGC823 and SNU5 induces morphology changes and suppresses cell proliferation. Transfection with miR-663 also sees a resultant upregulation of cyclin B.

== miR-155 upregulation and other molecular targets ==
Resveratrol, a natural phenol and antioxidant, upregulates miR-663 in human THP-1 monocytic cells, human blood monocytes and MCF7 brest cancer cells. Endogenous activator protein-1 (AP-1) activity is decreased by miR-663 and there is additional impaired lipopolysaccharide upregulation. miR-663 directly targets JunD and JunB transcripts, and alters AP-1 upregulation through this. It is further involved in the impaired lipopolysaccharide upregulation of miR-155 by resveratrol. miR-663 also directly targets EEF1A2, translation elongation factor and well-known protooncogene.

== See also ==
- MicroRNA
