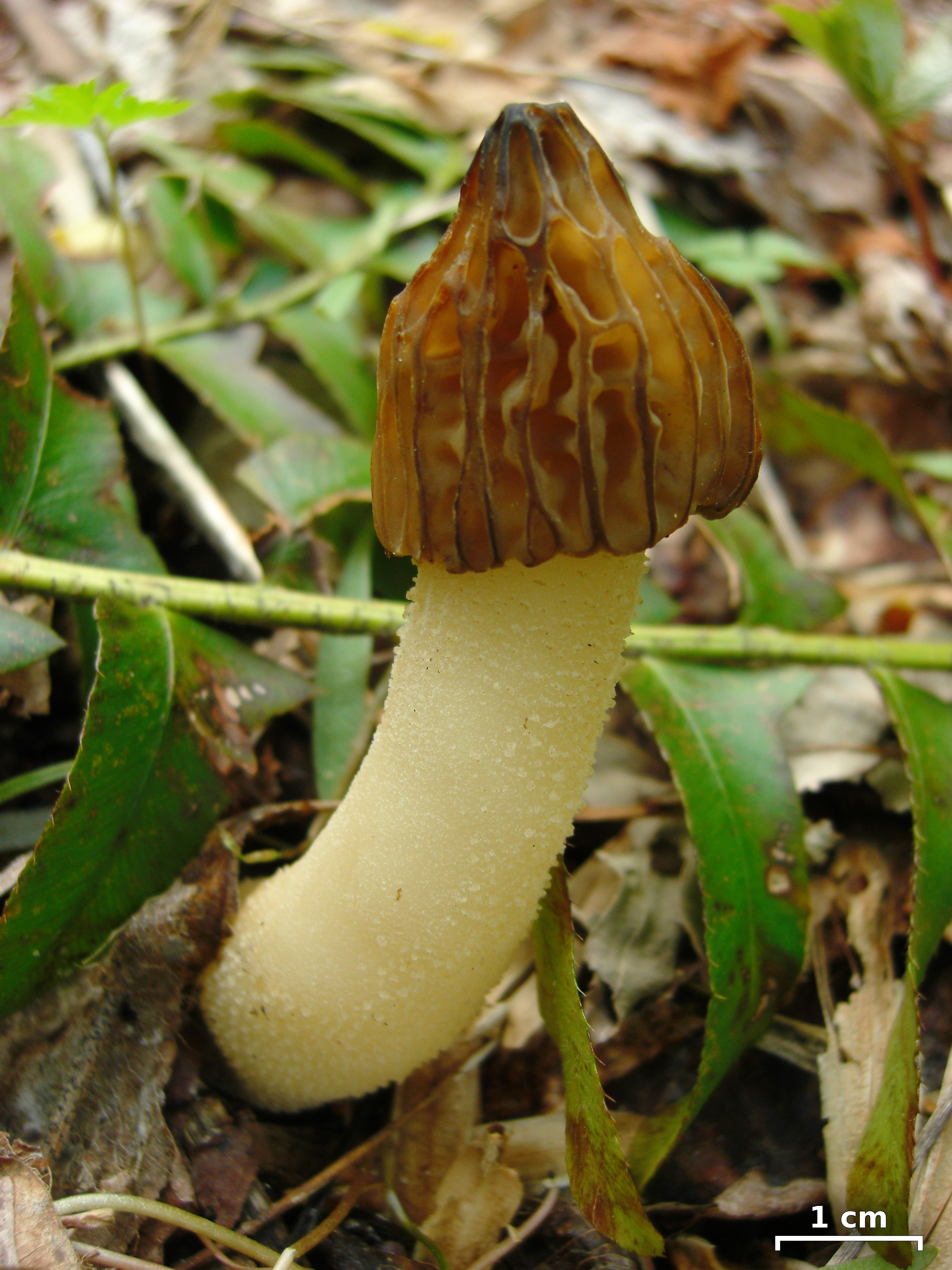
- In North Carolina, United States

Scientific classification
- Kingdom: Fungi
- Division: Ascomycota
- Class: Pezizomycetes
- Order: Pezizales
- Family: Morchellaceae
- Genus: Morchella
- Species: M. punctipes

Binomial name
- Morchella punctipes Peck (1903)

= Morchella punctipes =

Species of fungus

Morchella punctipes
- Mycological characteristics
- Smooth hymenium
- Cap is conical
- Hymenium attachment is not applicable
- Stipe is bare
- Spore print is white to yellow-orange
- Ecology is saprotrophic or mycorrhizal
- Edibility is choice or can cause allergic reactions

Morchella punctipes is a species of morel fungus in the family Morchellaceae. It is native to North America, found widely distributed east of the Rocky Mountains. It is edible when cooked.

== Taxonomy ==
Morchella punctipes was first found in Michigan and described scientifically by American mycologist Charles Horton Peck in 1903. It was once thought that M. punctipes was the same species as M. semilibera, but this was disproven via DNA studies.

== Description ==
The fruit bodies of M. punctipes are 2.5–18 centimetres (1–7 inches) tall.

The cap is 1.5–4.5 cm (1/2–1 3/4 in) tall and wide with a shape that is glabrous, conical, or occasionally almost convex. It has ridges bordering round, vertical pits. The ridges are pale yellow to dull yellowish brown when young; they darken to brown, dark brown, or black with maturity. The pits are whitish to pale yellowish when immature, darkening to brownish to yellowish brown with maturity. The caps attach to the stipe in a skirt-like manner, roughly halfway from the apex.

The stipe grows to be 1.5–15 cm (1/2–6 in) tall and 0.8–4.5 cm (1/4–1 3/4 in) wide. It is equal, fragile, and white to whitish or watery brownish in color. The surface of the stipe can have shallow, longitudinal grooves, and typically features white, mealy granules. The inside of the stipe is hollow and can have chambers near the bulbous base. When young, the stipe is short and can be hidden by the cap, but it gains significant length with age.

=== Microscopic characteristics ===
The ascospores are elliptical and smooth with homogenous contents. They are 20–27 x (10–)14–18 μm in size and whitish to bright yellowish orange in deposit. Asci eight-spored; 175–350 x 15–25 μm; cylindrical; hyaline. The paraphyses are cylindrical with rounded, subcapitate, clavate, mucronate or irregularly inflated apices; septate; hyaline in KOH (2%); 120–275 x 10–22 μm. Elements on sterile ridges 50–100 x 10–25 μm; septate; tightly packed in an even layer; brownish in KOH (2%); terminal cell broadly clavate to sub-rectangular with a flattened to broadly rounded or submucronate apex.

=== Similar species ===
M. punctipes is similar to G. gigas and M. rimosipes, but unlike the two, its cap is freely attached to the stipe. M. punctipes is one of three species of fungi commonly referred to as half-free morels, the others being M. populiphila in western North America and M. semilibera in Europe, the latter having smaller spores than M. punctipes.

Additional lookalikes may include other Morchella species, as well as Verpa bohemica.

== Distribution and habitat ==
The species is native to eastern North America and is commonly found east of the Rocky Mountains. The mushrooms are found in hardwood forests, often where white ash, American elm, and American tulip trees grow. Fruit bodies appear around late March in southern areas to late May in northern areas.

== Uses ==
It is an edible species with a mild flavor but, like all morels, specimens need to be cooked before being consumed.
