= Eukaryotic translation elongation factor 1 alpha 1 =

Constitutive promoter

EEF1A1

Identifiers
- Aliases: EEF1A1, CCS-3, CCS3, EE1A1, EEF-1, EEF1A, EF-Tu, EF1A, GRAF-1EF, HNGC:16303, LENG7, PTI1, eEF1A-1, eukaryotic translation elongation factor 1 alpha 1, EF1A1, EF1alpha1
- External IDs: OMIM: 130590; MGI: 1096881; GeneCards: EEF1A1
Available structures
PDB	Ortholog search: PDBe RCSB
PDB	List of PDB id codes 1SYW, 3C5J

Gene location (Human)
Chr.	Chromosome 6 (human)
Band	6q13	Start	73,489,308 bp
Band	6q13	End	73,525,587 bp

Gene location (Mouse)
Chr.	Chromosome 9 (mouse)
Band	9|9 E1	Start	78,385,731 bp
Band	9|9 E1	End	78,396,433 bp
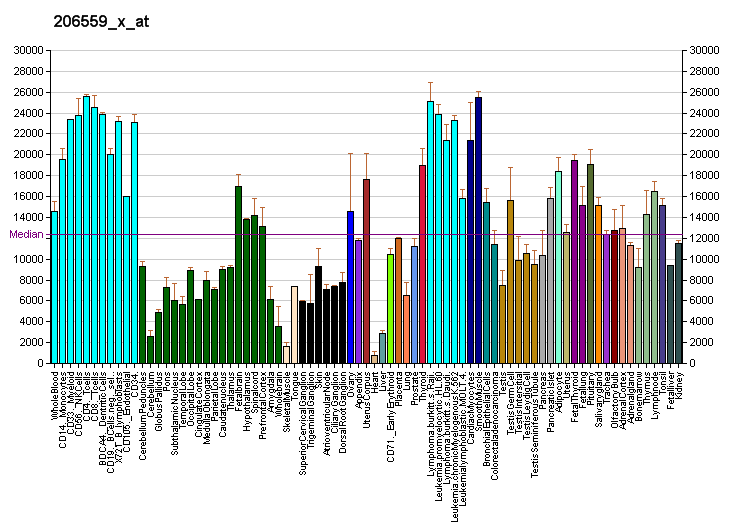

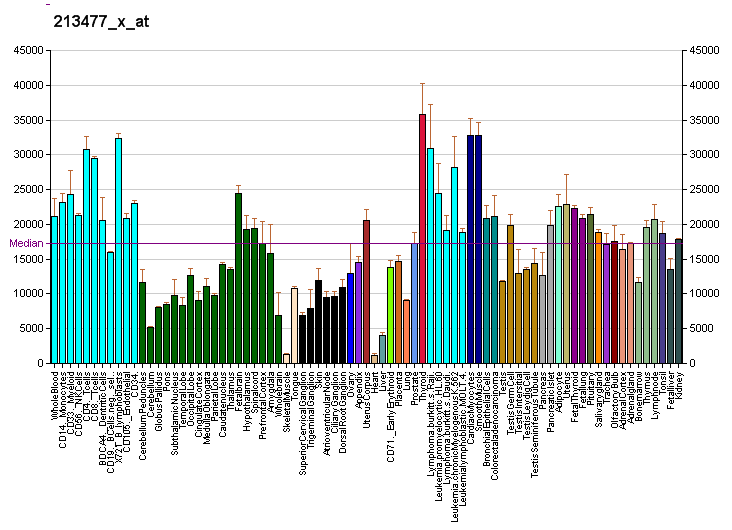

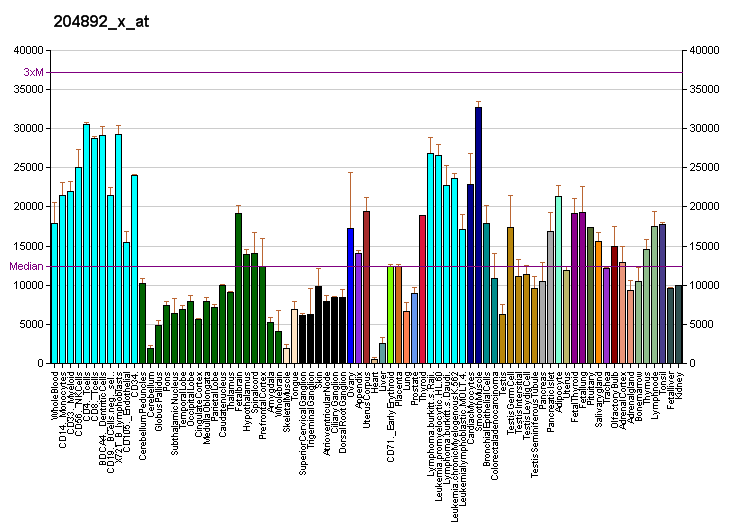
RNA expression pattern
Bgee	Human / Mouse (ortholog); Top expressed in: ganglionic eminence; ventricular zone; stromal cell of endometrium; canal of the cervix; left ovary; right ovary; smooth muscle tissue; gallbladder; body of uterus; gonad / Top expressed in: epiblast; ventricular zone; dentate gyrus of hippocampal formation granule cell; tail of embryo; uterus; urinary bladder; thymus; ovary; ganglionic eminence; genital tubercle; More reference expression data
BioGPS	More reference expression data
Gene ontology
Molecular function	nucleotide binding; tRNA binding; GTP binding; translation elongation factor activity; protein binding; GTPase activity; protein kinase binding; RNA binding; calmodulin binding; kinase binding
Cellular component	cytoplasm; cytosol; cytoplasmic side of lysosomal membrane; ruffle membrane; nucleolus; cortical actin cytoskeleton; extracellular exosome; nucleus; eukaryotic translation elongation factor 1 complex; extracellular region; extracellular space; secretory granule lumen; ficolin-1-rich granule lumen; plasma membrane; membrane; myelin sheath
Biological process	regulation of transcription, DNA-templated; translational elongation; transcription, DNA-templated; cellular response to epidermal growth factor stimulus; regulation of chaperone-mediated autophagy; protein biosynthesis; protein methylation; neutrophil degranulation; regulation of D-erythro-sphingosine kinase activity
Sources:Amigo / QuickGO
Orthologs
Databases	NCBI: entry; OMA: entry
Species	Human	Mouse
Entrez	1915	13627
Ensembl	ENSG00000156508	ENSMUSG00000037742
UniProt	P68104	P10126
RefSeq (mRNA)	NM_001402; NM_001403	NM_010106
RefSeq (protein)	NP_001393	NP_034236
Location (UCSC)	Chr 6: 73.49 – 73.53 Mb	Chr 9: 78.39 – 78.4 Mb
PubMed search
- Wikidata
View/Edit Human	View/Edit Mouse

Elongation factor 1-alpha 1 (eEF1a1) is a translation elongation protein, expressed across eukaryotes. In humans, it is encoded by the EEF1A1 gene.

This gene encodes an isoform of the alpha subunit of the elongation factor-1 complex, which is responsible for the enzymatic delivery of aminoacyl tRNAs to the ribosome. This isoform (alpha 1) is expressed in brain, placenta, lung, liver, kidney, and pancreas, and the other isoform (alpha 2) is expressed in brain, heart and skeletal muscle. This isoform is identified as an autoantigen in 66% of patients with Felty's syndrome. This gene has been found to have multiple copies on many chromosomes, some of which, if not all, represent different pseudogenes.

== Structure ==
Mammalian eEF1A possesses two paralogs, eEF1A1 and eEF1A2, with high amino acid sequence homology (approximately 90% identity). The sequences of their promoter regions are also highly similar, though that of the eEF1A2 gene contains an additional 81 bp SV40 small antigen sequence at the 5′-end. The EEF1A1 5' UTR also contains a terminal oligopyrimidine tract. Thus, these two isoforms demonstrate differences in expression and function: eEF1A1 is expressed in most cells while eEF1A2 is only expressed in adult neuronal and muscle cells, and only eEF1A1 induces HSP70 during heat shock.

== Function ==
The eEF1A1 protein is an isoform of the eEF-1 complex alpha subunit, an elongation factor protein, a GTPase, and an actin bundling protein. As an elongation factor, it is known to mediate the recruitment of aminoacyl-tRNA to the A-site of the 80S ribosome during protein synthesis. As a result, this protein is ubiquitously expressed.

In addition to its role in translation, eEF1A has been shown to play a central role in the nuclear export of proteins. Thus, eEF1A can be found in both the cytoplasm for translation and in the nucleus for nuclear transport. VHL, PABP1 and other proteins containing a TD-NEM (Transcription Dependent Nuclear Export Motif) are exported by eEF1A in a manner that is dependent on ongoing RNA polymerase II (RNA PolII)-dependent transcription.

Moreover, it participates in several processes required for cell growth and proliferation, including cytoskeleton organization, mitotic apparatus formation, and signal transduction. This protein colocalizes with filamentous actin (F-actin) and is just as abundantly expressed. eEF1A putatively binds actin and microtubules at synapses to modulate the cytoskeleton. In neurons, this ability allows for regulation of the number and size of inhibitory postsynaptic complexes like postsynaptic gephyrin clusters. eEF1A has also been found to bind to several kinases, phospholipases, and synaptic proteins. For instance, while associated with actin, it can activate phosphatidylinositol 4-kinase, which then regulates phosphatidylinositol 4-phosphate and phosphatidylinositol 4,5-bisphosphate levels. This protein can also act as a membrane receptor for the cryptic antiadhesive site of fibronectin, thus inhibiting cell anchorage and promoting apoptosis, or anoikis. Though it has not been observed to localize to the cell membrane, it can be found in the outer cell surface. Its role in apoptosis may also contribute to regulation of cell growth and the immune response.

Additional functions of eEF1A1 include: serving as a coactivator of the mineralocorticoid receptors in the heart and kidney to enhance expression of endogenous GILZ, SGK1, and CNKSR3; mediating the TNFα-induced decrease in endothelial nitric oxide synthase mRNA stability; detecting misfolded proteins and targeting them to the proteosome for proteolytic degradation; stabilizing viral and cellular RNAs by binding the 3' region; regulating transcription by recruiting and activating HSF1; and induction of HSP70 during heat shock.

== Clinical Significance ==
Upregulation of eEF1A has been reported in breast cancer samples. Interestingly, however, this upregulation only occurs at the protein level, because the mRNA level is significantly reduced in breast cancer samples. This paradox has been explained by cell cycle-regulated EEF1A1 mRNA expression and stress-induced increase in eEF1A protein levels in breast cancer cells. Though its role in metastasis remains unclear, the role of eEF1A in cytoskeleton organization may promote tumor cell motility and thus spread. Alternatively, apoptotic cells may secrete antigens, including eEF1A and other elongation factors, to induce an autoimmune response during cancer. It is postulated that high expression and secretion of elongation factors from tumor tissues, combined with altered levels of eEF1A-derived bacterial peptides in neoplastic disease, may lead to autoimmunity in breast cancer.

As with breast cancer, upregulation of eEF1A expression is associated with prostate cancer and worsened metastasis-free and overall patient survival. Moreover, a truncated form of the eEF1A1 protein, prostate tumour inducing gene 1 (PTI-1), has been detected in prostate carcinoma patient-derived blood samples. As eEF1A1 is over-expressed in osteoblasts, which proliferate and differentiate in the presence of tumor cells, it may serve as a serum biomarker to track the metastatic progression of prostate cancer.

In the case of acute T lymphocytic leukemia, knocking down the eEF1A1 gene produces inhibited proliferation and induced apoptosis of Jurkat cells. These effects may be attributed to the resulting down-regulation of the PI3K/Akt/NF-κB and PI3K/Akt/mTOR signaling pathways.

eEF1A1 is downregulated in myocardial infarction and potentially participates in cardiovascular disease through its interactions with mineralocorticoid receptors in the heart. Its role in heat shock response presents it as a target for treating related diseases like spinal and bulbar muscular atrophy (SBMA) and amyotrophic lateral sclerosis (ALS).

== Interactions ==
Eukaryotic translation elongation factor 1 alpha 1 has been shown to interact with:

- PLCG1,
- actin,
- muscarinic acetylcholine receptor,
- α2 subunit of GlyR, and
- SAMHD1.
