= EEF1B2P1 =

Pseudogene in the species Homo sapiens

Identifiers
- Aliases: EEF1B2P1, EEF1B1, EF1B, eukaryotic translation elongation factor 1 beta 2 pseudogene 1
- External IDs: GeneCards: EEF1B2P1; OMA:EEF1B2P1 - orthologs
Orthologs
Species	Human	Mouse
Entrez	1932	n/a
Ensembl	ENSG00000231169	n/a
UniProt	n a	n/a
RefSeq (mRNA)	n/a	n/a
RefSeq (protein)	n/a	n/a
Location (UCSC)	n/a	n/a
PubMed search		n/a
- Wikidata
View/Edit Human

Eukaryotic translation elongation factor 1 beta 2 pseudogene 1 (eEF1B1) is a protein that in humans is encoded by the EEF1B2P1 gene.

== See also ==
- eEF-1
