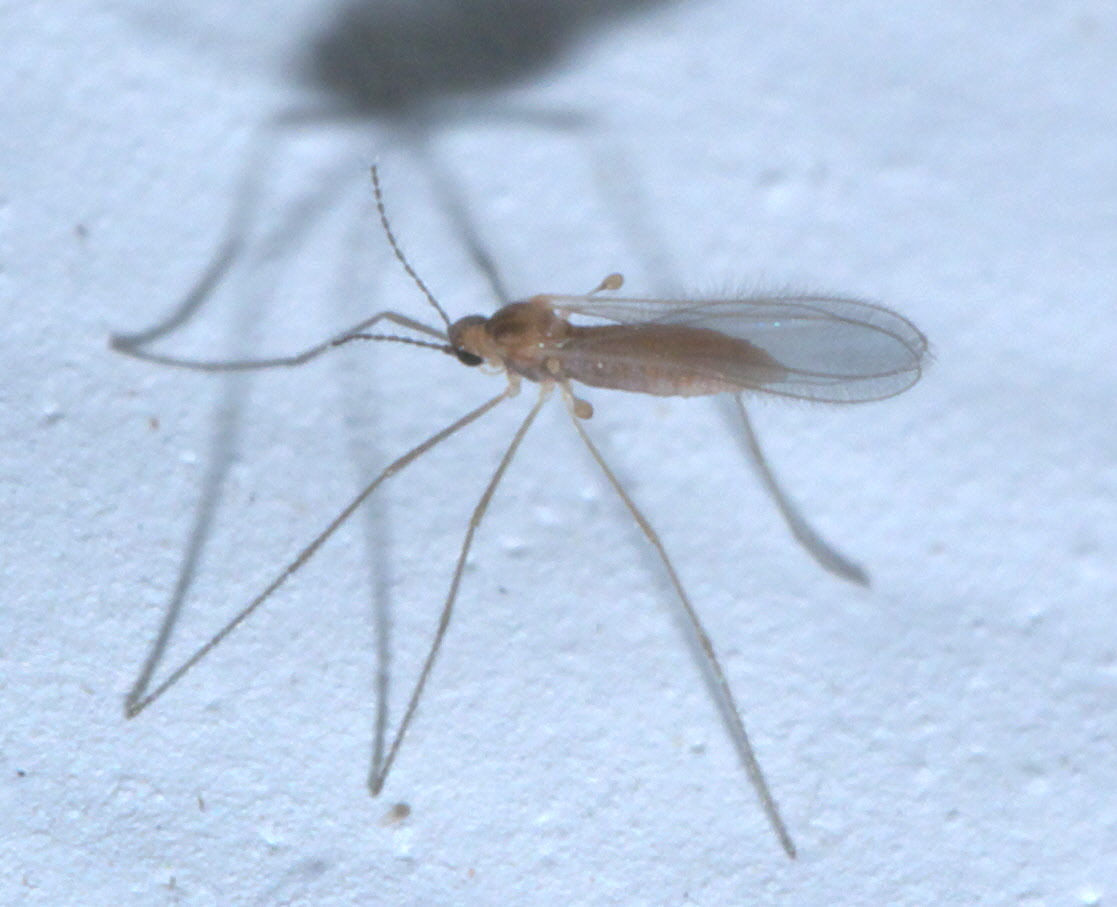
- Isocolpodia

Scientific classification
- Domain: Eukaryota
- Kingdom: Animalia
- Phylum: Arthropoda
- Class: Insecta
- Order: Diptera
- Family: Cecidomyiidae
- Subfamily: Porricondylinae
- Genus: Isocolpodia; Parnell, 1971

= Isocolpodia =

Genus of flies

Isocolpodia is a genus of gall and forest midges in the family Cecidomyiidae. There are about six described species in Isocolpodia.

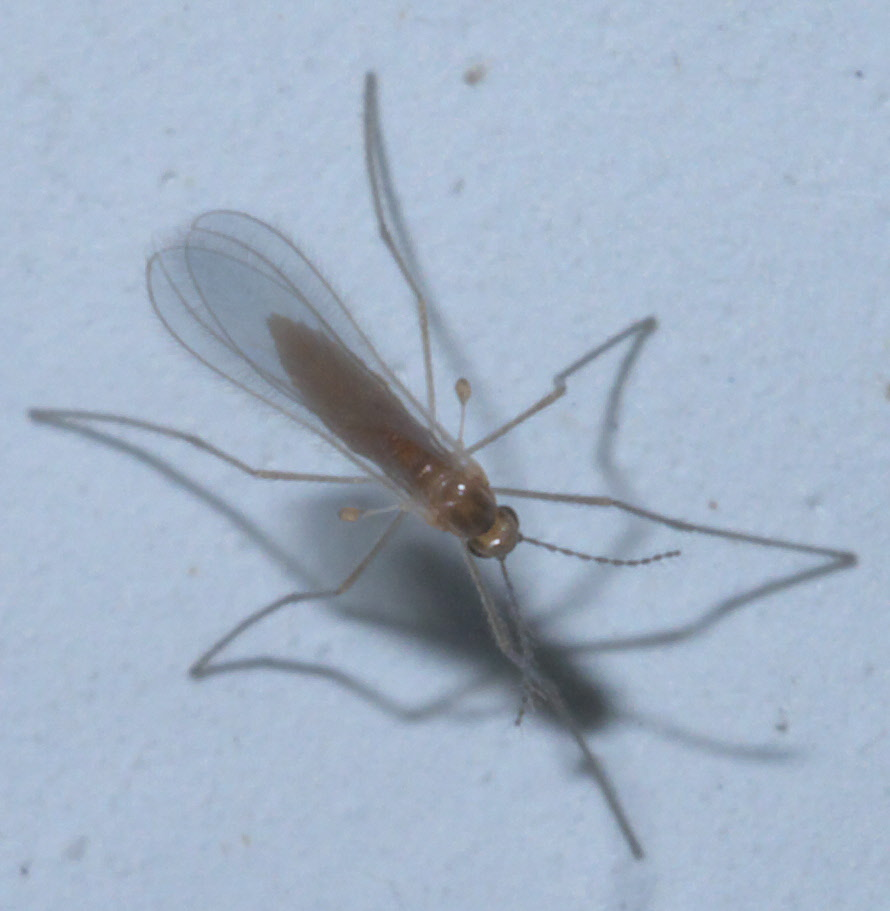
Isocolpodia

== Species ==
These six species belong to the genus Isocolpodia:

- Isocolpodia alta (Felt, 1908)
- Isocolpodia diervillae (Felt, 1907)
- Isocolpodia graminis (Felt, 1907)
- Isocolpodia hortensis Plakidas, 2019
- Isocolpodia sinuosa (Mamaev & Zaitzev, 1998)
- Isocolpodia unidentata Kieffer
