= Mir-744 microRNA precursor family =

mir-744

Identifiers
- Symbol: mir-744
- Rfam: RF00936
- miRBase family: MIPF0000431

Other data
- RNA type: microRNA
- Domain: Eukaryota;
- PDB structures: PDBe

In molecular biology mir-744 microRNA is a short RNA molecule. MicroRNAs function to regulate the expression levels of other genes by several mechanisms.

== miR-744 and cancer in mice ==
miR-744 plays a role in tumour development and growth in mouse cell lines. Its expression induces cyclin B1 expression, whilst knockdown sees a resultant decreased level of mouse cyclin B through the Ccnb1 gene. Short-term overexpression of miR-744 in mouse cell lines has been seen to enhance cell proliferation, whilst chromosomal instability and in vivo suppression are concurrent with a prolonged expression.

== TGF-β1 repression ==
Multiple miR-744 binding sites have been identified in the proximal 3' untranslated region of transforming growth factor beta 1 (TGF-β1). Direct targeting of TGF-β1 by miR-744 has been identified, and transfection is seen to inhibit endogenous TGF-β1 synthesis by directing post-transcriptional regulation.

== EEF1A2 repression ==
miR-744 directly targets translation elongation factor and known protooncogene EEF1A2. mIR-744 also upregulates during resveratrol treatment of MCF7 breast cancer cells.

== See also ==
- MicroRNA
