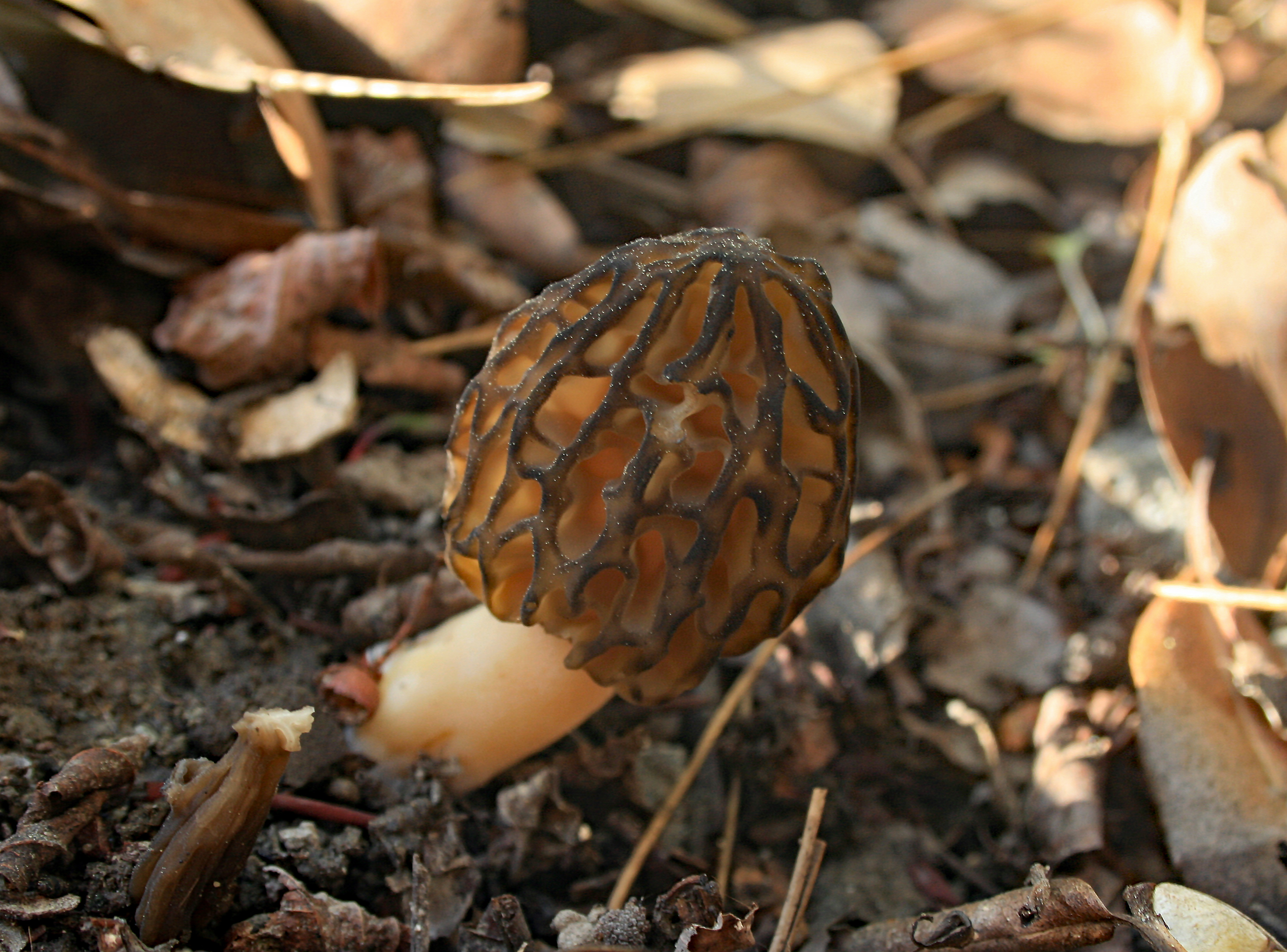

Scientific classification
- Domain: Eukaryota
- Kingdom: Fungi
- Division: Ascomycota
- Class: Pezizomycetes
- Order: Pezizales
- Family: Morchellaceae
- Genus: Morchella
- Species: M. arbutiphila

Binomial name
- Morchella arbutiphila Loizides, Bellanger & P.-A. Moreau

= Morchella arbutiphila =

Species of fungus

Morchella arbutiphila is a species of fungus in the family Morchellaceae (Ascomycota), described from the island of Cyprus in 2016. The species is notable for its elongated stipe, which is often longer than the cap's length, its ascospores which are larger than most other species of Morchella, and its highly specific ecological preferences. It is known only from igneous substrates of the Troodos Mountains in Cyprus and from a single collection in the Aegean region of Turkey.

== Taxonomy and phylogeny ==
Morchella arbutiphila was described as new to science by Loizides and colleagues, in a 2016 phylogenetic and morphological study of the genus Morchella from the island of Cyprus. This lineage was initially detected in Turkey in a 2010 study by Taşkın and colleagues, when it was assigned the informal designator Mel-30, following a collection from Muğla. Molecular analysis of nucleic acid sequences from the internal transcribed spacer (ITS), the elongation factor EF-1α, and the RNA polymerase II (rpb1, rpb2) regions, placed this species in the Mel-17–34 species complex, strongly supporting it as a monophyletic lineage sister to the Mel-23/24/31/32 subclade, as defined by Richard and colleagues.

Its epithet derives from the Greek word φίλος (friend), and Arbutus, the tree the fungus typically associates with.

== Description ==
The fruit bodies are medium- to large-sized and have a markedly elongated stipe, often longer than the cap's length. The cap is conical, ovoid or subspherical, 3–6(–7) cm high by 1–2(–3) cm wide, pinkish-brown, honey-brown, olivaceous-brown, or sometimes with purplish or vinaceous tinges, and is attached to the stipe with a well-defined sinus. The longitudinal ridges are moderately spaced with several anastomoses and in young fruit bodies they are the same colour as the pits, but in maturity they gradually darken creating a sharp contrast. The secondary interconnecting ridges are usually sparse. Pits are numerous, elongated or roundish and more or less vertically aligned. The cylindrical stipe is 3–7(–9) high by 0.9–2(–4) cm wide, white or sometimes with purplish or pinkish tinges at the apex, furfuraceous and weakly to moderately wrinkled. The stipe length is typically equal or longer than the cap. The flesh is firm and thick, with a typical morel odour.

The ascospores are large, measuring (22–)23–29(– 31) × (14–)16–17(–18) μm, ellipsoid or subcylindrical, hyaline (translucent) and have external droplets attached to the poles. Although they appear smooth under a light microscope, when viewed in lactophenol cotton blue or under a scanning electron microscope, the spore surface is distinctly longitudinally grooved. The asci (spore-bearing cells) measure 305–385 × 18–29 μm, are cylindrical to clavate, hyaline and have one septum at the base. The paraphyses measure 110–190(–230) × 12–20(–24) μm, are usually slender, irregularly cylindrical and with variously shaped tips, with one septum at the base or sometimes an additional 1–2 septa in the lower third. The acroparaphyses (cells on the sterile ridges) are fasciculate, measure 100–190 × 12–30 μm and are cylindrical to irregularly clavate, with 1–3 septa. The stipe surface is composed of variously sized spherical, subspherical, pear-shaped or subcylindrical cells, with chains of long, distinctly catenulate terminal elements measuring 125–140 × 12–20(– 35) μm.

== Habitat and distribution ==
Morchella arbutiphila is so far known only from Cyprus and Turkey. On Cyprus, it is confined to the igneous and acidic substrates of the Troodos Mountains, fruiting in spring in association with the Greek strawberry tree (Arbutus andrachne).
