= EEF1B2P3 =

Protein-coding gene in humans

Identifiers
- Aliases: EEF1B2P3, EEF1B4, eukaryotic translation elongation factor 1 beta 2 pseudogene 3
- External IDs: GeneCards: EEF1B2P3; OMA:EEF1B2P3 - orthologs

Gene location (Human)
Chr.	X chromosome (human)
Band	Xp22.11	Start	24,788,392 bp
Band	Xp22.11	End	24,789,069 bp
RNA expression pattern
Bgee	Human / Mouse (ortholog); Top expressed in: Achilles tendon; testicle; corpus callosum; gonad; bone marrow cell; stromal cell of endometrium; tonsil; body of pancreas; gastrocnemius muscle; muscle of thigh / n/a; More reference expression data
BioGPS	n/a
Orthologs
Species	Human	Mouse
Entrez	644820	n/a
Ensembl	ENSG00000232472	n/a
UniProt	n a	n/a
RefSeq (mRNA)	NM_001089876	n/a
RefSeq (protein)	n/a	n/a
Location (UCSC)	Chr X: 24.79 – 24.79 Mb	n/a
PubMed search		n/a
- Wikidata
View/Edit Human

Eukaryotic translation elongation factor 1 beta 2 pseudogene 3 (eEF1B4) is a protein that in humans is encoded by the EEF1B2P3 gene.

== See also ==
- eEF-1
