= EEF1B2P2 =

Pseudogene in the species Homo sapiens

Identifiers
- Aliases: EEF1B2P2, BETA-3, EEF-1, EEF-1BETA5A, EEF1B, EEF1B3, eukaryotic translation elongation factor 1 beta 2 pseudogene 2
- External IDs: GeneCards: EEF1B2P2; OMA:EEF1B2P2 - orthologs

Gene location (Human)
Chr.	Chromosome 5 (human)
Band	5q13.1	Start	68,159,218 bp
Band	5q13.1	End	68,159,893 bp
RNA expression pattern
Bgee	Human / Mouse (ortholog); Top expressed in: duodenum; ganglionic eminence; mucosa of transverse colon; skeletal muscle tissue; rectum; stromal cell of endometrium; muscle of leg; smooth muscle tissue; triceps surae; gastrocnemius muscle / n/a; More reference expression data
BioGPS	n/a
Orthologs
Species	Human	Mouse
Entrez	1934	n/a
Ensembl	ENSG00000213864	n/a
UniProt	n a	n/a
RefSeq (mRNA)	n/a	n/a
RefSeq (protein)	n/a	n/a
Location (UCSC)	Chr 5: 68.16 – 68.16 Mb	n/a
PubMed search		n/a
- Wikidata
View/Edit Human

Eukaryotic translation elongation factor 1 beta 2 pseudogene 2 (eEF1B3) is a protein that in humans is encoded by the EEF1B2P2 gene.

== See also ==
- eEF-1
