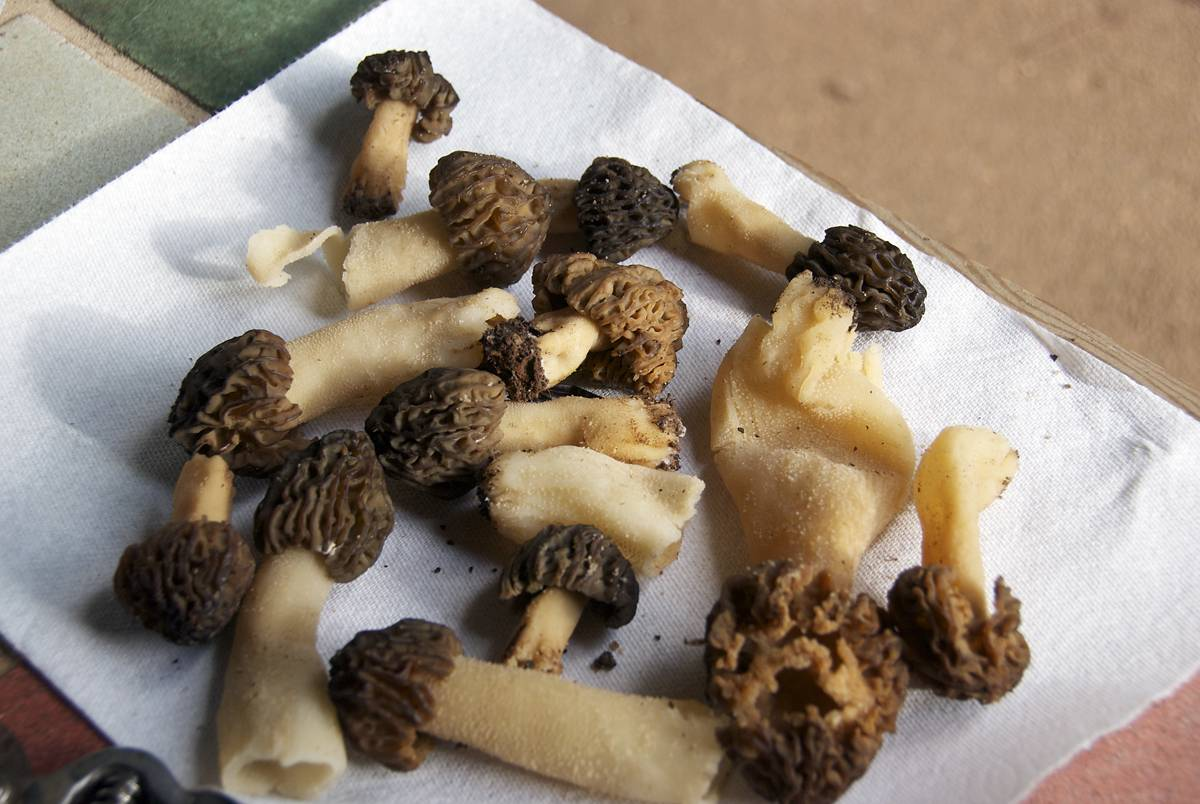

Scientific classification
- Kingdom: Fungi
- Division: Ascomycota
- Class: Pezizomycetes
- Order: Pezizales
- Family: Morchellaceae
- Genus: Morchella
- Species: M. populiphila

Binomial name
- Morchella populiphila M.Kuo, M.C.Carter & J.D.Moore (2012)

= Morchella populiphila =

Species of fungus

Morchella populiphila
- Mycological characteristics
- Smooth hymenium
- Cap is conical
- Hymenium attachment is not applicable
- Stipe is bare
- Spore print is yellow-orange
- Ecology is saprotrophic or mycorrhizal
- Edibility is choice or can cause allergic reactions

Morchella populiphila is a species of morel fungus (family Morchellaceae) native to northwestern North America. Described as new to science in 2012, its specific epithet refers to its association with black cottonwood (Populus trichocarpa). The morel used to be referred to as Morchella semilibera in western North American field guides until molecular analysis established that to be a strictly European species. M. populiphila occurs in California, Nevada and Oregon. Its fruit bodies grow up to 15 cm (6 in) tall with a ridged and pitted conical cap that attaches about halfway down the stipe. The cap ridges are dark brown to black in maturity, while the pits are yellowish to brownish. The fungus is edible, although not as highly valued as other morels. Morchella populiphila is one of three species of fungi commonly referred to as "half-free" morels, the others being Morchella punctipes in eastern North America and Morchella semilibera in Europe.

== Taxonomy ==
Morchella populiphila was one of 14 new Morchella species described in 2012 by Michael Kuo and colleagues as a result of the Morel Data Collection Project, which was aimed at clarifying the biology, taxonomy, and distribution of morel species in the United States and Canada. The type locality is in Jackson County, Oregon. The fungus used to be referred to as Morchella semilibera (the "half-free morel") in western North American field guides until molecular analysis established that to be a strictly European species. It was previously referred to as phylogenetic species Mel-5 (i.e., identified based on DNA sequence) in a 2011 publication. The specific epithet populiphila refers to its association with the tree species Populus trichocarpa.

== Description ==
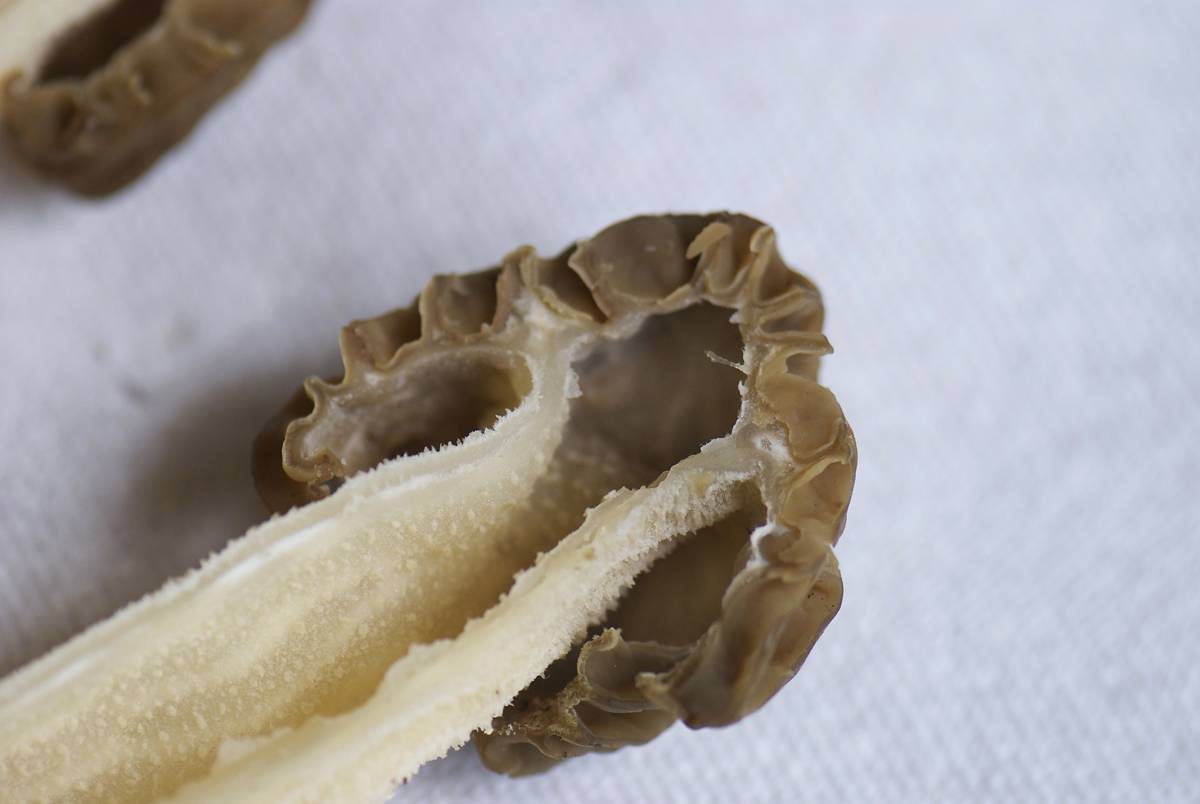
Section of a fruit body showing cap attachment to the stipe and inner surfaces

The fruit bodies are 4–15 cm (1.6–5.9 in) high with a conical cap that is 2–5 cm (0.8–2.0 in) tall and 2–5 cm (0.8–2.0 in) wide at the widest point. The cap surface has pits and ridges, formed by the intersection of 12–20 primary vertical ridges and infrequent shorter, secondary vertical ridges and transecting horizontal ridges. The cap is attached in a skirt-like manner to the stipe, roughly halfway from the top, with a sinus 1–2.5 cm (0.4–1.0 in) deep. The ridges are smooth and colored yellowish brown to honey brown when young, but darken in age to brown, dark brown or black. When young the ridges are up to 1 mm wide and flat with sharp edges but usually become rounded, sharp or eroded in age. The pits are smooth and vertically elongated. Initially whitish to pale brown when immature, they become brownish to yellowish or grayish brown at maturity. The fragile stipe measures 2.5–11 cm (1.0–4.3 in) tall by 1–5 cm (0.4–2.0 in) thick and is roughly the same width throughout its length, or tapered towards the top. It is often hidden by the cap when young but becomes longer as it matures, often developing shallow longitudinal furrows. In warm, wet conditions the stipe sometimes becomes inflated, especially near the base. White to whitish or watery brownish in color, its texture is occasionally nearly smooth but more commonly covered with mealy whitish granules that sometimes darken to brown. Orson K. Miller likened the stipe texture to that of a cow tongue. The fragile, whitish to watery tan flesh is 1–2 mm thick in the hollow cap, and sometimes forms chambers or layers near the base. The whitish to brownish sterile inner surface of the cap is covered in mealy granules.

In deposit, the spores are bright yellowish orange. Ascospores are smooth, elliptical, and typically measure 20–25 by 12–16 μm. Asci (spore-bearing cells) are eight-spored, cylindrical, hyaline (translucent), and measure 225–325 by 15–22.5 μm. Paraphyses are septate, and cylindrical with tips that are rounded to club-shaped, and measure 150–275 by 7–15 μm. Hyphal cells on sterile ridges are septate, measuring 100–175 by 10–25 μm. They are tightly packed in an even layer. The terminal hyphae are club-shaped to somewhat rectangular with a flattened to broadly rounded tip.

Although Morchella populiphila is an edible species, it is not as highly valued as other morels because of its fragile nature and its inferior flavor.

=== Similar species ===
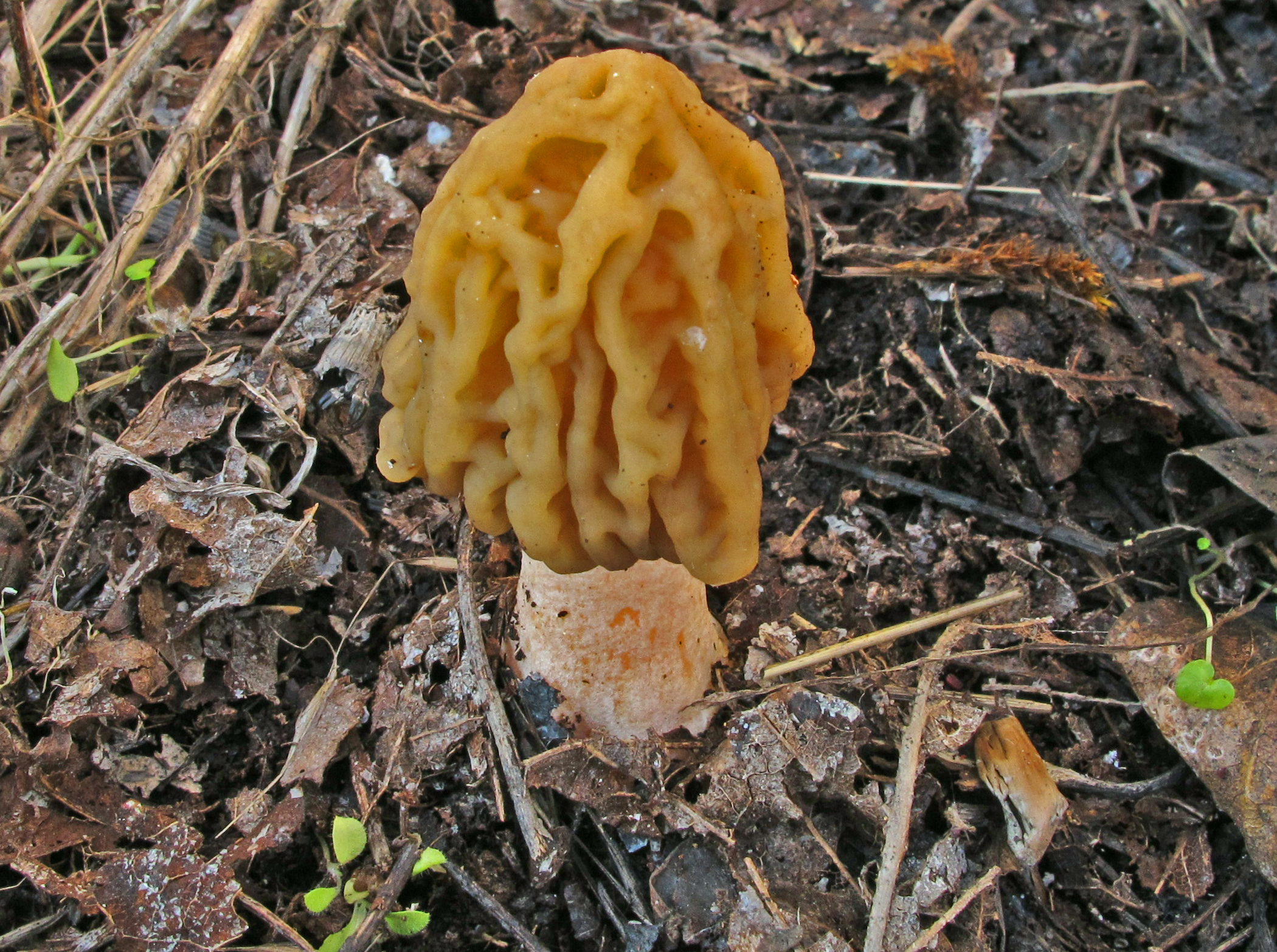
The cap of the false morel Verpa bohemica hangs free from attachment to the stipe.

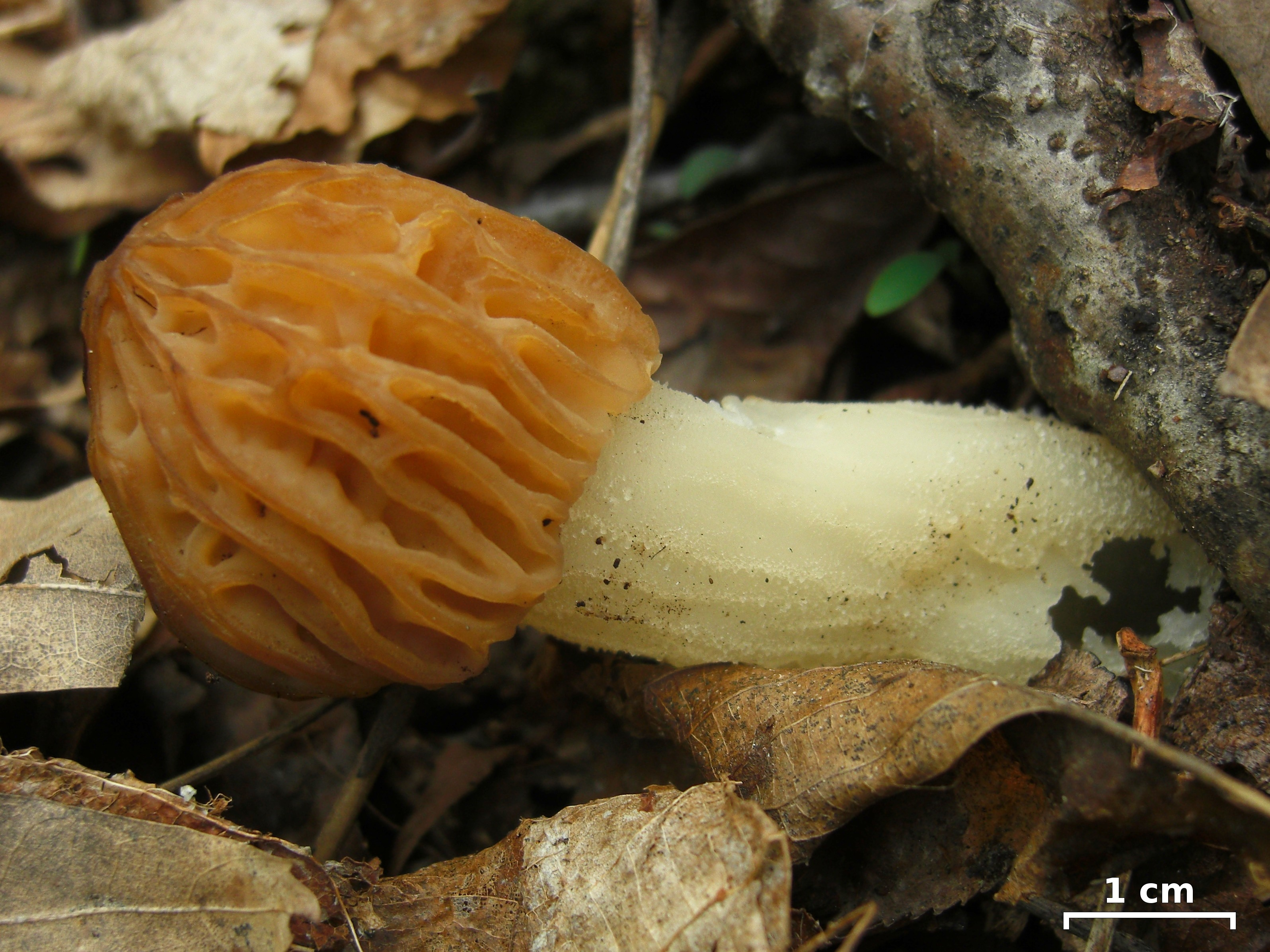
Morchella populiphila is morphologically indistinguishable from its eastern North American relative M. punctipes.

Morchella populiphila is a distinct morel because of its cap attachment and its habitat, and it is unlikely to be mistaken for other species. Verpa bohemica is somewhat similar in appearance, but its cap hangs free from attachment to the stipe. The other North American half-free morel, Morchella punctipes, is very similar in appearance to M. populiphila, and they cannot be reliably distinguished on morphology alone. The distribution of M. punctipes extends from the Great Plains eastward. The widespread European species Morchella semilibera is morphologically indistinguishable from M. populiphila, in both macroscopic and microscopic characteristics.

== Habitat and distribution ==
Like many morel species, the ecological mode of Morchella populiphila is not known with certainty, but it is suspected of being both saprobic (obtaining its nourishment from nonliving or decaying organic matter) and mycorrhizal (symbiotic with trees) at different stages in its life cycle. Fruit bodies grow singly, scattered, or in groups. It is found in Oregon to Nevada and northern California, where it grows on dried-out riverbeds. Fruiting, which occurs in the spring, tends to occur shortly after the emergence of Verpa mushrooms, and before the appearance of other morels.

Morchella populiphila has been found in Europe, but is suspected to have been introduced with trees from North America. In 2017, the species was reported from eastern Turkey (Van Province), based on material collected in the Çatak district under Populus at 1,684 m (5,525 ft) elevation; this was presented as the first record of M. populiphila for Turkey.
