= CNKSR3 =

Protein-coding gene in the species Homo sapiens

Identifiers
- Aliases: CNKSR3, MAGI1, CNKSR family member 3, CNK3, CNK3/IPCEF1
- External IDs: OMIM: 617476; MGI: 2674130; GeneCards: CNKSR3

Gene location (Human)
Chr.	Chromosome 6 (human)
Band	6q25.2	Start	154,387,504 bp
Band	6q25.2	End	154,510,659 bp

Gene location (Mouse)
Chr.	Chromosome 10 (mouse)
Band	10|10 A1	Start	7,069,063 bp
Band	10|10 A1	End	7,162,237 bp
RNA expression pattern
Bgee	Human / Mouse (ortholog); Top expressed in: retinal pigment epithelium; mucosa of ileum; cartilage tissue; palpebral conjunctiva; amniotic fluid; vena cava; tibia; oral cavity; ventricular zone; parotid gland / Top expressed in: renal corpuscle; ciliary body; conjunctival fornix; lobe of cerebellum; endothelial cell of lymphatic vessel; cerebellar vermis; otolith organ; utricle; cornea; iris; More reference expression data
BioGPS	n/a
Gene ontology
Molecular function	protein binding
Cellular component	cytoplasm; membrane; plasma membrane; apical plasma membrane
Biological process	regulation of signal transduction; positive regulation of sodium ion transport; negative regulation of peptidyl-serine phosphorylation; negative regulation of ERK1 and ERK2 cascade; positive regulation of sodium ion transmembrane transporter activity
Sources:Amigo / QuickGO
Orthologs
Databases	NCBI: entry; OMA: entry
Species	Human	Mouse
Entrez	154043	215748
Ensembl	ENSG00000153721	ENSMUSG00000015202
UniProt	Q6P9H4	Q8BMA3
RefSeq (mRNA)	NM_173515	NM_172546
RefSeq (protein)	NP_775786; NP_001355045; NP_001355046; NP_001355047; NP_001355048	NP_766134
Location (UCSC)	Chr 6: 154.39 – 154.51 Mb	Chr 10: 7.07 – 7.16 Mb
PubMed search
- Wikidata
View/Edit Human	View/Edit Mouse

CNKSR family member 3 is a protein that in humans is encoded by the CNKSR3 gene.
