= EEF1A2 =

Protein-coding gene in the species Homo sapiens

Identifiers
- Aliases: EEF1A2, EEF1AL, EF-1-alpha-2, EF1A, HS1, STN, STNL, EIEE33, MRD38, eukaryotic translation elongation factor 1 alpha 2, DEE33
- External IDs: OMIM: 602959; MGI: 1096317; GeneCards: EEF1A2
Available structures
| PDB | Ortholog search: PDBe RCSB |
| PDB | List of PDB id codes 4C0S, 3C5J |

Gene location (Human)
| Chr. | Chromosome 20 (human) |
| Band | 20q13.33 | Start | 63,488,013 bp |
| Band | 20q13.33 | End | 63,499,239 bp |

Gene location (Mouse)
| Chr. | Chromosome 2 (mouse) |
| Band | 2 H4|2 103.6 cM | Start | 180,789,446 bp |
| Band | 2 H4|2 103.6 cM | End | 180,798,807 bp |
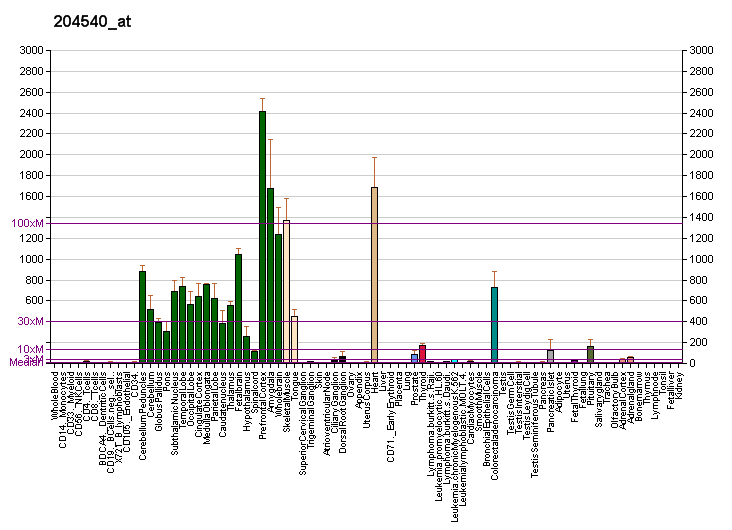
RNA expression pattern
| Bgee | Human / Mouse (ortholog); Top expressed in: gastrocnemius muscle; apex of heart; muscle of thigh; paraflocculus of cerebellum; right hemisphere of cerebellum; frontal pole; thoracic diaphragm; Skeletal muscle tissue of rectus abdominis; Brodmann area 10; cerebellar vermis / Top expressed in: perirhinal cortex; entorhinal cortex; CA3 field; primary motor cortex; subiculum; superior colliculus; habenula; prefrontal cortex; pontine nuclei; triceps brachii muscle; More reference expression data |
| BioGPS | More reference expression data |
Gene ontology
| Molecular function | nucleotide binding; GTP binding; translation factor activity, RNA binding; protein binding; protein kinase binding; GTPase activity; translation elongation factor activity |
| Cellular component | myelin sheath; soma; cytoplasmic side of lysosomal membrane; nucleus; eukaryotic translation elongation factor 1 complex; cytoplasm; synapse |
| Biological process | positive regulation of apoptotic process; regulation of chaperone-mediated autophagy; translational elongation; positive regulation of lipid kinase activity; response to electrical stimulus; protein biosynthesis; response to inorganic substance |
Sources:Amigo / QuickGO
Orthologs
| Databases | NCBI: entry; OMA: entry |
| Species | Human | Mouse |
| Entrez | 1917 | 13628 |
| Ensembl | ENSG00000101210 | ENSMUSG00000016349 |
| UniProt | Q05639 | P62631 |
| RefSeq (mRNA) | NM_001958 | NM_007906 |
| RefSeq (protein) | NP_001949 | NP_031932 |
| Location (UCSC) | Chr 20: 63.49 – 63.5 Mb | Chr 2: 180.79 – 180.8 Mb |
| PubMed search |
- Wikidata
| View/Edit Human | View/Edit Mouse |

Elongation factor 1-alpha 2 is a protein that in humans is encoded by the EEF1A2 gene.

== Function ==
This gene encodes an isoform of the alpha subunit of the elongation factor-1 complex, which is responsible for the enzymatic delivery of aminoacyl tRNAs to the ribosome. This isoform (alpha 2) is expressed in brain, heart and skeletal muscle, and the other isoform (alpha 1) is expressed in brain, placenta, lung, liver, kidney, and pancreas.

== Clinical significance ==
This gene may be critical in the development of ovarian cancer.

== Regulation ==
EEF1A2 is a direct target of miRNA-663 and miRNA-744.
