= EEF-1 =

Eukaryotic elongation factors

Elongation factor 1 beta central acidic region, eukaryote

Identifiers
- Symbol: EF1_beta_acid
- Pfam: PF10587
- InterPro: IPR018940
- SMART: SM01182
Available protein structures:
- PDB: IPR018940 PF10587 (ECOD; PDBsum)
- AlphaFold: IPR018940; PF10587

Translation elongation factor EF1B, beta/delta subunit, guanine nucleotide exchange domain

Identifiers
- Symbol: EF1_GNE
- Pfam: PF00736
- InterPro: IPR014038
- SMART: SM00888
- CDD: cd00292
Available protein structures:
- PDB: IPR014038 PF00736 (ECOD; PDBsum)
- AlphaFold: IPR014038; PF00736

eEF-1 are two eukaryotic elongation factors. It forms two complexes, the EF-Tu homolog EF-1A and the EF-Ts homolog EF-1B, the former's guanide exchange factor. Both are also found in the archaea domain.

== Structure ==
The nomenclature for the eEF-1 subunits have somewhat shifted around circa 2001, as it was recognized that the EF-1A and EF-1B complexes are to some extent independent of each other. Components as currently recognized and named include:

Current Nomenclature	Old Nomenclature	Human Genes	Canonical Function
eEF1A	eEF1α	EEF1A1, EEF1A2; EEF1A1P43	aa-tRNA delivery to the ribosome; associates with aa-tRNA synthase complex.
eEF1Bα	eEF1β (animal, fungi) eEF1β' (plant)	EEF1B2; EEF1B2P1, EEF1B2P2, EEF1B2P3	GEF for eEF1A.
eEF1Bβ	eEF1β (plant)	(None)	Additional GEF for eEF1A in plants with CDF-kinase-controlled activity.
eEF1Bγ	eEF1γ	EEF1G	Structural component.
eEF1Bδ	eEF1δ	EEF1D	Additional GEF for eEF1A in animals.
eEF1ε	eEF1ε	EEF1E1	Not really an elongation factor. Scaffolding for the aa-tRNA synthase complex.
Val-RS	Val-RS	VARS	Valyl-tRNA synthetase, binds eEF1Bδ in rabbits.

The precise manner eEF1B subunit attaches onto eEF1A varies by organ and species. eEF1A also binds actin.

== Other species ==
Various species of green algae, red algae, chromalveolates, and fungi lack the EF-1α gene but instead possess a related gene called EFL (elongation factor-like). Although its function has not been studied in depth, it appears to be similar to EF-1α.

As of 2009, only two organisms are known to have both EF-1α and EFL: the fungus Basidiobolus and the diatom Thalassiosira. The evolutionary history of EFL is unclear. It may have arisen one or more times followed by loss of EFL or EF-1α. The presence in three diverse eukaryotic groups (fungi, chromalveolates, and archaeplastida) is supposed to be the result of two or more horizontal gene transfer events, according to a 2009 review. A 2013 report finds 11 more species with both genes, and provided an alternative hypothesis that an ancestor eukaryote may have both genes. In all known organisms where both genes are present, EF-1α tends to be transcriptionally repressed. If the hypothesis holds true, scientists would expect to find an organism that has a repressed EFL and a fully-functioning EF-1α.

A 2014 review of EF-1α/EFL possessing eukaryotes considers both explanations insufficient on their own to explain the complex distribution of these two proteins in Eukaryotes.

In eukaryotes, a related GTPase called eRF3 participates in translation termination. The archaeal EF-1α, on the other hand, performs all functions carried by these subfunctionalized variants.

== See also ==
- Eukaryotic translation
