= Porricondylinae =

Porricondylinae Temporal range: Barremian–Recent

Scientific classification
- Domain: Eukaryota
- Kingdom: Animalia
- Phylum: Arthropoda
- Class: Insecta
- Order: Diptera
- Family: Cecidomyiidae
- Subfamily: Porricondylinae

Subfamily of flies

Porricondylinae is a subfamily of gall midges and wood midges in the family Cecidomyiidae.

== Genera ==
List of genera, after Gagné & Jaschhof (2014):

- Tribe Asynaptini
  - Asycola Spungis 1991
  - Asynapta Loew 1850
  - Colomyia Kieffer 1892
  - Camptomyia Kieffer 1894
  - Epicola Spungis 1991
  - Feltomyia Alexander 1936
  - Larimyia Fedotova & Sidorenko 2007
  - Lobopedosis Fedotova & Sidorenko 2005
  - Parasynapta Panelius 1965
  - Pseudocamptomyia Parnell 1971
  - Stackelbergiella Marikovskij 1958
  - Svenartia Jaschhof 2013
- Tribe Dicerurini
  - †Adsumyia Fedotova & Perkovsky 2008 Rovno amber, Ukraine, Eocene
  - Arctepidosis Mamaev 1990
  - †Cretadicerura Azar and Nel, 2020, Lebanese amber, Barremian
  - Desertepidosis Mamaev & Soyunov 1989
  - Dicerura Kieffer 1898
  - Dirhiza Loew 1850
  - Glemparon Jaschhof 2013
  - Grisepidosis Mamaev 1968
  - †Libanohilversidia Azar and Nel, 2020, Lebanese amber, Barremian
  - Hilversidia Mamaev 1966
  - Neurepidosis Spungis 1987
  - Paratetraneuromyia Spungis 1987
  - Recessepidosis Fedotova & Sidorenko 2008
  - Solntsevia Mamaev 1965
  - Tetraneuromyia Mamaev 1964
  - Ubinomyia Mamaev 1990
  - †Velafacera Fedotova & Perkovsky 2008 Rovno amber, Eocene
  - Vulnepidosis Fedotova & Sidorenko 2007
- Tribe Porricondylini
  - Ancorepidosis Fedotova & Sidorenko 2008
  - Anisepidosis Fedotova & Sidorenko 2005
  - Armatepidosis Fedotova & Sidorenko 2007
  - Bryocrypta Kieffer 1896
  - Bulbepidosis Mamaev 1990
  - Cassidoides Mamaev 1960
  - Cedrocrypta Kieffer 1919:
  - Claspettomyia Grover 1964
  - Coccopsis Meijere 1901:
  - Cognitepidosis Fedotova & Sidorenko 2005
  - Cryptodontomyia Jaschhof 2013
  - Cryptoneurus Mamaev 1964
  - Dallaiella Mamaev 1997
  - Dendrepidosis Mamaev 1990
  - Dentepidosis Mamaev 1990
  - Divellepidosis Fedotova & Sidorenko 2007
  - Furcepidosis Mamaev 1990
  - †Gratomyia Fedotova & Perkovsky 2008 Rovno amber, Ukraine, Eocene
  - Holoneurus Kieffer 1895
  - Incrementistyla Fedotova & Sidorenko 2007
  - Isocolpodia Parnell 1971
  - Jamalepidosis Mamaev 1990
  - Lamellepidosis Mamaev 1990
  - Melicepidosis Fedotova & Sidorenko 2007
  - Monepidosis Mamaev 1966
  - Neocolpodia Mamaev 1964
  - Obryzepidosis Fedotova & Sidorenko 2007
  - Paneliusia Jaschhof 2013
  - Parepidosis Kieffer 1913
  - Parvovirga Jaschhof 2013
  - Paurodyla Jaschhof 2013
  - Porricondyla Rondani 1840
  - Pseudepidosis Mamaev 1966
  - Putepidosis Fedotova & Sidorenko 2007
  - Pyxicoccopsis Fedotova & Sidorenko 2007
  - Rostellatyla Jaschhof 2013
  - Rostratyla Jaschhof 2013
  - Schistoneurus Mamaev 1964
  - Sclerepidosis Mamaev 1990
  - Serratyla Jaschhof 2013
  - Seychellepidosis Spungis 2007
  - Spungisomyia Mamaev & Zaitzev 1996
  - Stomatocolpodia Mamaev 1990
  - Trichepidosis Mamaev 1990
  - †Volnococcopsis Fedotova & Perkovsky 2008 Rovno amber, Eocene
  - Yukawaepidosis Fedotova & Sidorenko 2007
  - Zaitzeviola Fedotova & Sidorenko 2007
  - Zatsepinomyia Mamaev & Zaitzev 1997
  - Zephyrepidosis Fedotova & Sidorenko 2008
- Incertae sedis
  - Clinophaena Kieffer 1913
  - Harpomyia Felt 1916
  - †Meunieria Kieffer 1904 Baltic amber, Eocene
  - Misocosmus Kieffer 1913
  - Monocolpodia Mamaev 1990
  - Nebulepidosis Fedotova & Sidorenko 2008
  - Palaeospaniocera Meunier 1901 African copal, recent
  - Rabindrodiplosis Grover 1964
  - Salpistepidosis Fedotova & Sidorenko 2007
  - Tersepidosis Fedotova & Sidorenko 2007
