= EEF1E1 =

Protein-coding gene in the species Homo sapiens

Available structures
PDB	Ortholog search: PDBe RCSB
PDB	List of PDB id codes 2UZ8, 4BL7, 4BVX, 4BVY, 5BMU

Identifiers
- Aliases: EEF1E1, AIMP3, P18, eukaryotic translation elongation factor 1 epsilon 1
- External IDs: OMIM: 609206; MGI: 1913393; HomoloGene: 3161; GeneCards: EEF1E1; OMA:EEF1E1 - orthologs

Gene location (Human)
Chr.	Chromosome 6 (human)
Band	6p24.3	Start	8,073,360 bp
Band	6p24.3	End	8,102,559 bp

Gene location (Mouse)
Chr.	Chromosome 13 (mouse)
Band	13|13 A3.3	Start	38,828,183 bp
Band	13|13 A3.3	End	38,843,034 bp
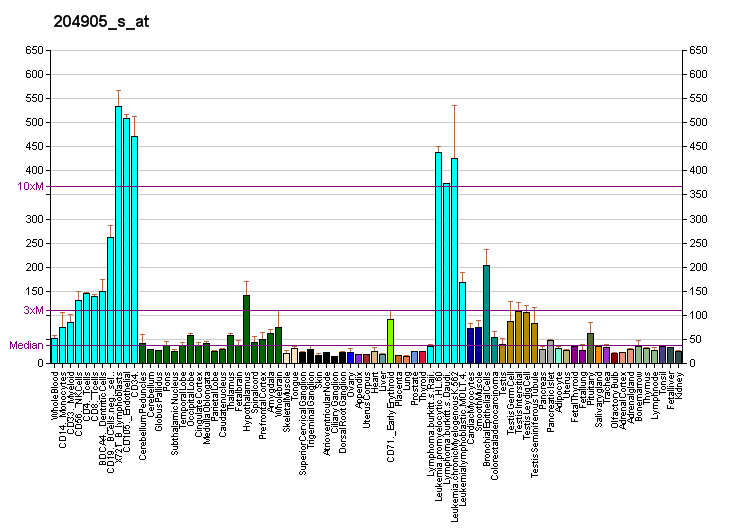
RNA expression pattern
Bgee	Human / Mouse (ortholog); Top expressed in: pons; oocyte; right testis; left testis; islet of Langerhans; gonad; testicle; C1 segment; embryo; right adrenal gland / Top expressed in: medial ganglionic eminence; endocardial cushion; superior cervical ganglion; migratory enteric neural crest cell; morula; barrel cortex; atrioventricular valve; yolk sac; neural layer of retina; interventricular septum; More reference expression data
BioGPS	More reference expression data
Gene ontology
Molecular function	protein binding; glutathione transferase activity
Cellular component	nucleoplasm; nucleolus; nucleus; cytoplasm; aminoacyl-tRNA synthetase multienzyme complex; cytosol
Biological process	positive regulation of apoptotic process; positive regulation of DNA damage response, signal transduction by p53 class mediator; tRNA aminoacylation for protein translation; protein biosynthesis; positive regulation of cellular senescence; negative regulation of cell population proliferation; glutathione metabolic process; cellular response to leukemia inhibitory factor; positive regulation of apoptotic signaling pathway
Sources:Amigo / QuickGO
Orthologs
Species	Human	Mouse
Entrez	9521	66143
Ensembl	ENSG00000124802	ENSMUSG00000001707
UniProt	O43324	Q9D1M4
RefSeq (mRNA)	NM_004280; NM_001135650	NM_025380
RefSeq (protein)	NP_001129122; NP_004271	NP_079656
Location (UCSC)	Chr 6: 8.07 – 8.1 Mb	Chr 13: 38.83 – 38.84 Mb
PubMed search
- Wikidata
View/Edit Human	View/Edit Mouse

Eukaryotic translation elongation factor 1 epsilon-1 is a protein that in humans is encoded by the EEF1E1 gene.
