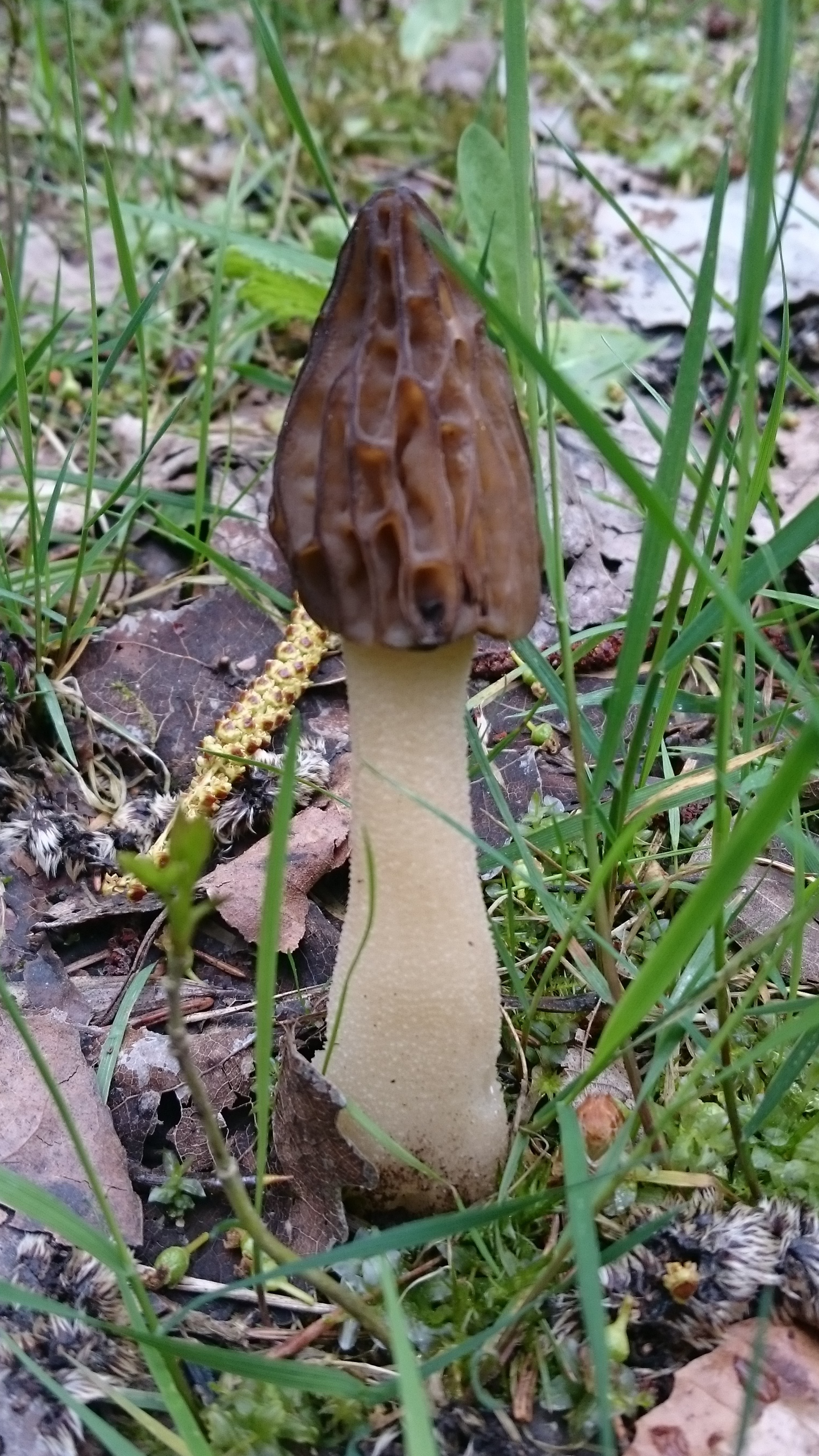
- Morchella semilibera

Scientific classification
- Kingdom: Fungi
- Division: Ascomycota
- Class: Pezizomycetes
- Order: Pezizales
- Family: Morchellaceae
- Genus: Morchella
- Species: M. semilibera

Binomial name
- Morchella semilibera DC. (1805)

Synonyms
- Mitrophora semilibera (DC.) Lév (1846); Morchella patula var. semilibera (DC.) S.Imai (1954)

= Morchella semilibera =

Species of fungus

Morchella semilibera
- Mycological characteristics
- Smooth hymenium
- Cap is conical or ovate
- Hymenium attachment is irregular or not applicable
- Stipe is bare
- Spore print is cream to yellow
- Ecology is mycorrhizal or saprotrophic
- Edibility is choice or can cause allergic reactions

Morchella semilibera, commonly called the half-free morel, is a species of fungus in the family Morchellaceae. It is native to Eurasia and is edible.

== Taxonomy ==
DNA analysis has shown that the half-free morels, which appear nearly identical on a macroscopic scale, are a cryptic species complex, consisting of at least three geographically isolated species. Because de Candolle originally described the species based on specimens from Europe, the scientific name M. semilibera should be restricted to the European species. In 2012, Morchella populiphila was described from western North America, while Peck's 1903 species name Morchella punctipes was reaffirmed for eastern North American half-free morels. M. semilibera and the other half-free morels are closely related to the black morels (M. elata and others).

A proposal has been made to conserve the name Morchella semilibera against several earlier synonyms, including Phallus crassipes, P. gigas and P. undosus. These names, sanctioned by Elias Magnus Fries, have since been shown to be the same species as M. semilibera.

== Description ==
The cap grows up to 5 centimetres (2 in) tall and wide, round at first and then conical. The ridges are vertical and slightly darker than the pits, blackish when dry. The underside is whitish and the flesh thin. The buff stalk is up to 10 cm long and 2.5 cm thick.

The spores are elliptical and smooth.

In age, when the head is smaller compared to the stalk, it can resemble Verpa species.

== Distribution and habitat ==
The species is native to Europe and Asia. It grows individually or in groups in wooded areas.

== Uses ==
The species is edible, but is fragile and not very flavorful.
