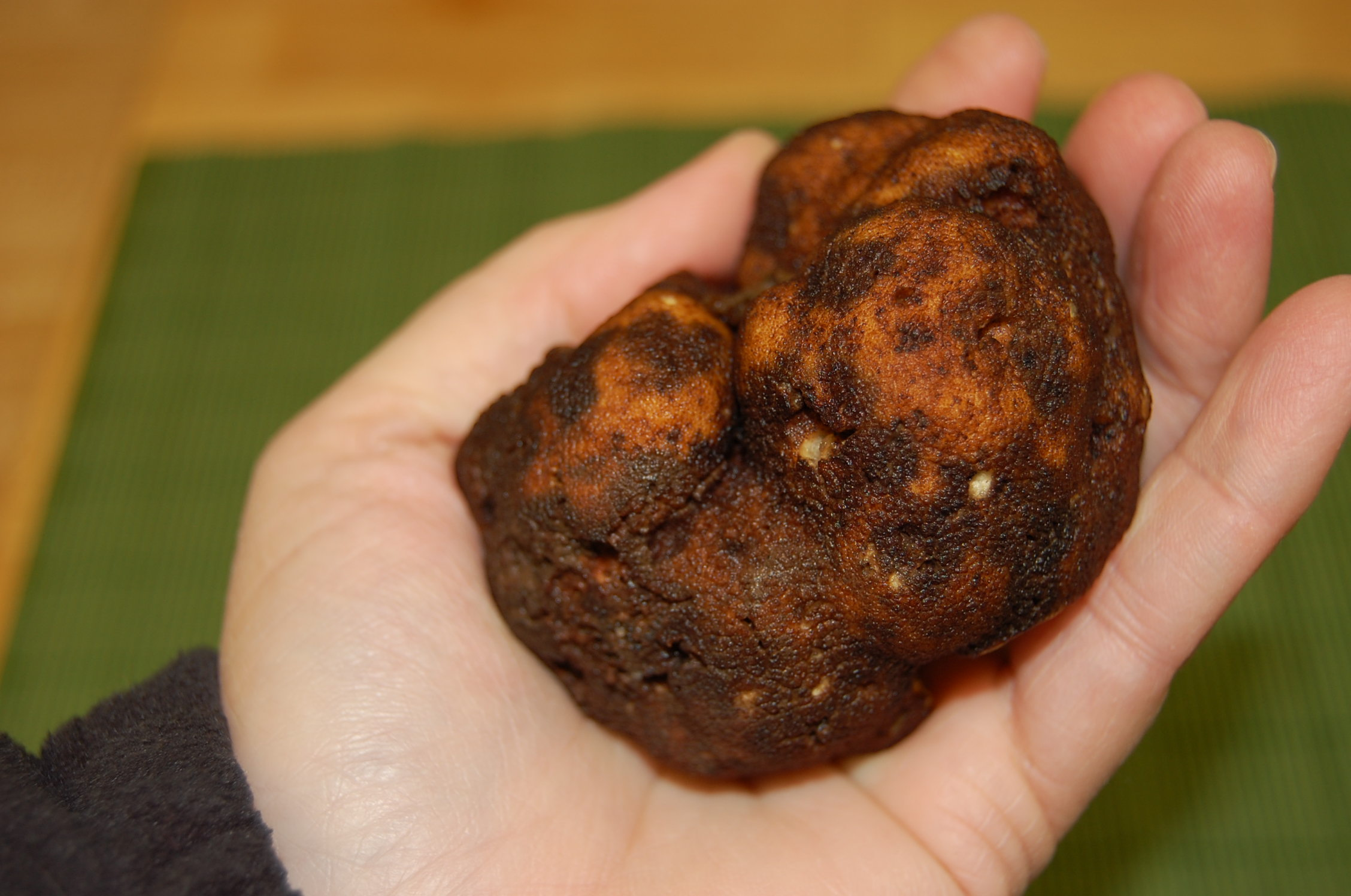

Scientific classification
- Kingdom: Fungi
- Division: Ascomycota
- Class: Pezizomycetes
- Order: Pezizales
- Family: Morchellaceae
- Genus: Kalapuya; M.Trappe, Trappe, & Bonito (2010)
- Species: K. brunnea

Binomial name
- Kalapuya brunnea M.Trappe, Trappe, & Bonito (2010)

= Kalapuya brunnea =

Oregon brown truffle

Species of fungus

Kalapuya brunnea is a species of truffle in the monotypic fungal genus Kalapuya. The truffle occurs only in the Pacific Northwest region of the United States, in western Oregon and northern California. Known locally as the Oregon brown truffle, it was formerly thought to be an undescribed species of Leucangium until molecular analysis demonstrated that it was distinct from that genus. The truffle is reddish brown with a rough and warty outer skin, while the interior spore-producing gleba is initially whitish before developing greyish-brown mottling as it matures. Mature truffles have an odor resembling garlicky cheese, similar to mature Camembert. The species has been harvested for culinary purposes in Oregon.

== Taxonomy ==
- - Various Morchella
  - - Verpa
    - Disciotis
    - Kalapuya
    - Fischerula
    - Imaia
    - Leucangium

A cladogram depicting the phylogeny of Kalapuya and related Morchellaceae genera based on DNA sequences

The species was first described scientifically in 2010, based on specimens collected in February, 2009 from Benton County, Oregon. Before this, it had been known locally for several years as the Oregon brown truffle, and assumed to be an undescribed species of Leucangium, based on its overall resemblance to and similar habitat as the Oregon black truffle, Leucangium carthusianum; it was given the provisional name Leucangium brunneum. Molecular analysis of DNA sequences revealed that the species is not related to the truffle genera of the family Tuberaceae, including Tuber, Dingleya and Reddellomyces. Rather, it has close affinity with the hypogeous (below the soil surface) genera of the Morchellaceae, including Fischerula, Imaia, and Leucangium, but both genetic and morphological characters are sufficiently distinct to warrant designation as a distinct genus. All four hypogeous Morchellaceae genera produce huge spores, with sizes ranging from 32 to 100 micrometers (μm). Both Kalapuya and Imaia have asci (spore-bearing cells) that have thick cell walls when young, but become thin when mature—a trait not shared with Fischerula. The authors explain that although the hypogeous Morchellaceae genera share the trait of large spore size, striking differences in spore structure and other morphological difference in microscopic characters would have ruled out placing them in the same family as Morchella, were it not for the convincing molecular evidence proving their relatedness.

The generic name Kalapuya refers to the Kalapuya people, a Native American ethnic group whose traditional homelands encompassed the range of the fungus. The Kalapuya people, however, are not known to have eaten the truffle, and some regard mushrooms as taboo food. The specific epithet brunnea is Latin for "brown", the color of the mature truffle.

== Description ==
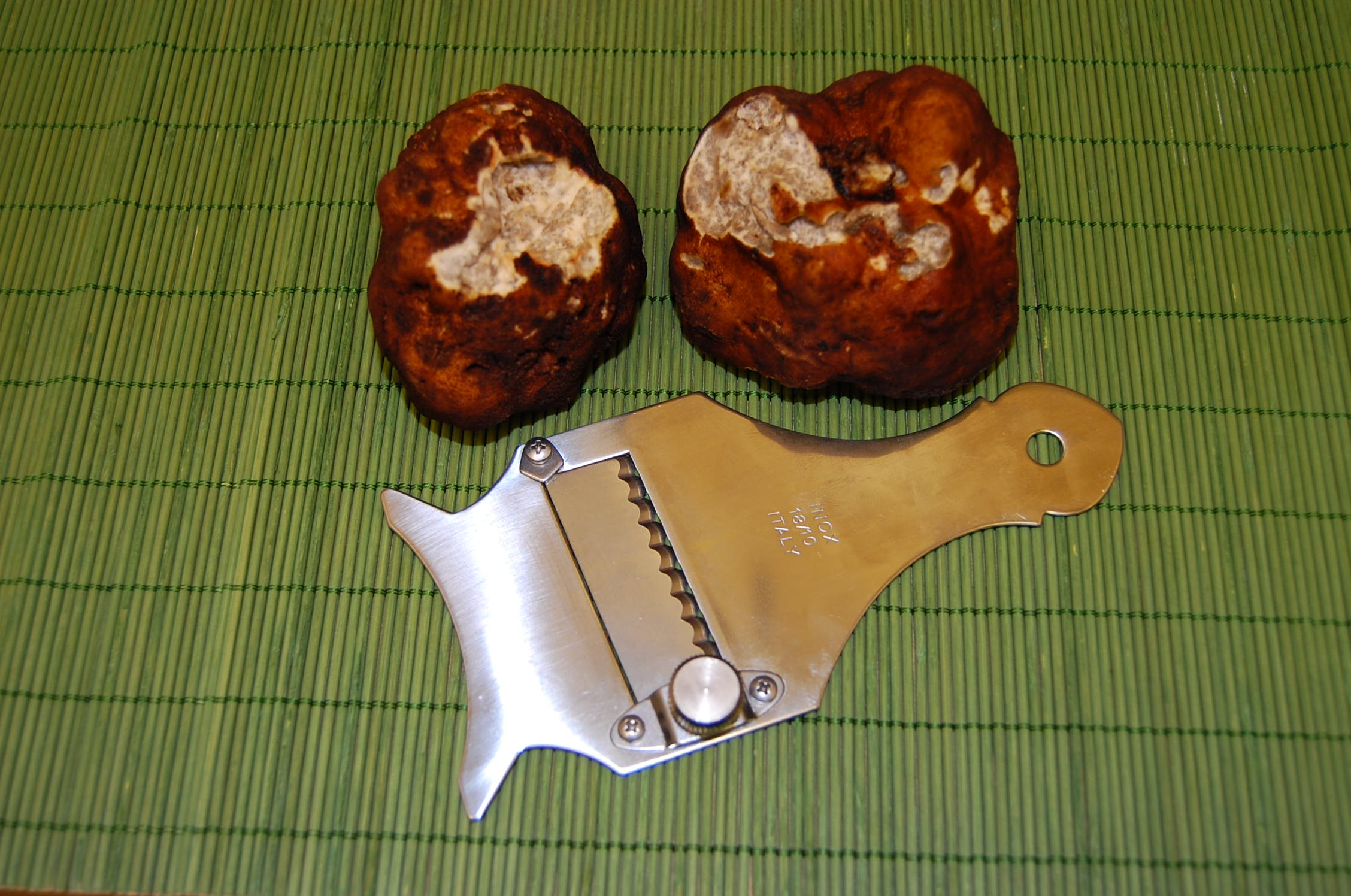
Oregon brown truffle is edible, and has been harvested for culinary purposes.

The truffle-like fruit bodies of Kalapuya are roughly spherical, with lobes and furrows, and dimensions of typically 12–60 millimetres (1/2–2 3/8 inches) by 10–45 mm (3/8–1 3/4 in). The peridium (outer "skin") is up to 2 mm thick, and ranges in color from light yellowish-brown to orange-brown to reddish-brown, usually with darker patches in maturity. The surface texture is rough, as the truffle is covered with flat to rounded warts that are 0.5–3 mm wide; larger warts often have smaller warts on them. Older specimens develop narrow cracks over the surface such that it becomes areolate or rimose. The undersurface of the peridium has an branching basal attachment that is roughly similar in texture to cartilage, and which breaks off readily when the truffle is extracted from the soil. The internal spore-bearing tissue, the gleba, is initially whitish and firm, but develops grayish-brown mottling as it matures.

The spores are ellipsoid in shape, with a smooth surface, and contain a large central oil drop surrounded by smaller droplets. The spore dimensions are 32–43 by 25–38 μm, the walls measuring 1–3 μm thick. Although not reactive with Melzer's reagent, spores stain readily with Methyl blue. The asci contain 6 to 8 spores per ascus. They are variably shaped, with dimensions of 70–110 by 60–100 μm, with a stem 10–40 by 6–10 μm, and a forked base. Initially about 3 μm thick, the ascus walls thin to roughly 1 μm when mature. The gleba comprises loosely interwoven, thin-walled hyaline hyphae measuring 5–13 μm in diameter.

=== Similar species ===
Leucangium carthusianum, the Oregon black truffle, is roughly similar in appearance, habitat, and growing season, but can be distinguished by its darker (charcoal black) peridium. Microscopically, the spores of Leucangium are larger (60–90 μm) and have a single large oil droplet. L. carthusianum is also edible and prized for its taste and aroma.

== Distribution and habitat ==
The species is known only from the Pacific Northwest region of the United States, where it grows in Douglas fir forests that are up to about 50 years old; the authors suggest that it is obligately symbiotic with this tree. Usually appearing from October through March, fruit bodies grow in the top 2–10 cm (3/4–4 in) of soil, beneath soil litter, at elevations ranging from roughly sea level to about 500 m (1,600 ft). It occurs on the west side of Oregon's Cascade Range, as well as in the Coastal Ranges of Oregon and northern California.

== Uses ==
The truffle is edible, and has been harvested for culinary purposes, although with less frequency than other Pacific Northwest truffles. Both the flavor and odor of the edible fruit body resemble mature Camembert cheese. One source described the taste as follows: "Served in melted butter on sliced baguette, they reminded of buttered lobster."

== See also ==
- Tuber oregonense – the Oregon white truffle
