= Nothojafnea =

Scientific classification
- Kingdom: Fungi
- Division: Ascomycota
- Class: Pezizomycetes
- Order: Pezizales
- Family: Pyronemataceae
- Genus: Nothojafnea; Rifai (1968)

Type species
- Nothojafnea cryptotricha Rifai (1968)

Species
- Nothojafnea cryptotricha Nothojafnea thaxteri

Genus of fungi

Nothojafnea is a genus of two species of cup fungi. It was originally described by Indonesian mycologist Mien Achmad Rifai in 1968 to contain the type species Nothojafnea cryptotricha, found in Australia. N. thaxteri, known from Chile and Argentina, was added to the genus in 1971. Both species are thought to be ectomycorrhizal; N. cryptotricha associates with Myrtaceae, while N. thaxteri is found with Nothofagus.

Nothojafnea is traditionally classified in the family Pyronemataceae, due to its ornamented spores and apothecial hairs. Recent molecular evidence suggests that the South American N. thaxteri represents an early diverging lineage in the Tuberaceae, closely related to the Australasian genera Reddellomyces, Labyrinthomyces, and Dingleya.
