= Oregon truffle =

Oregon truffle may refer to:

- Leucangium carthusianum, Oregon black truffle
- Tuber gibbosum, Oregon spring white truffle
- Tuber oregonense, Oregon winter white truffle
- Kalapuya brunnea, Oregon brown truffle

== See also ==
- Truffle
