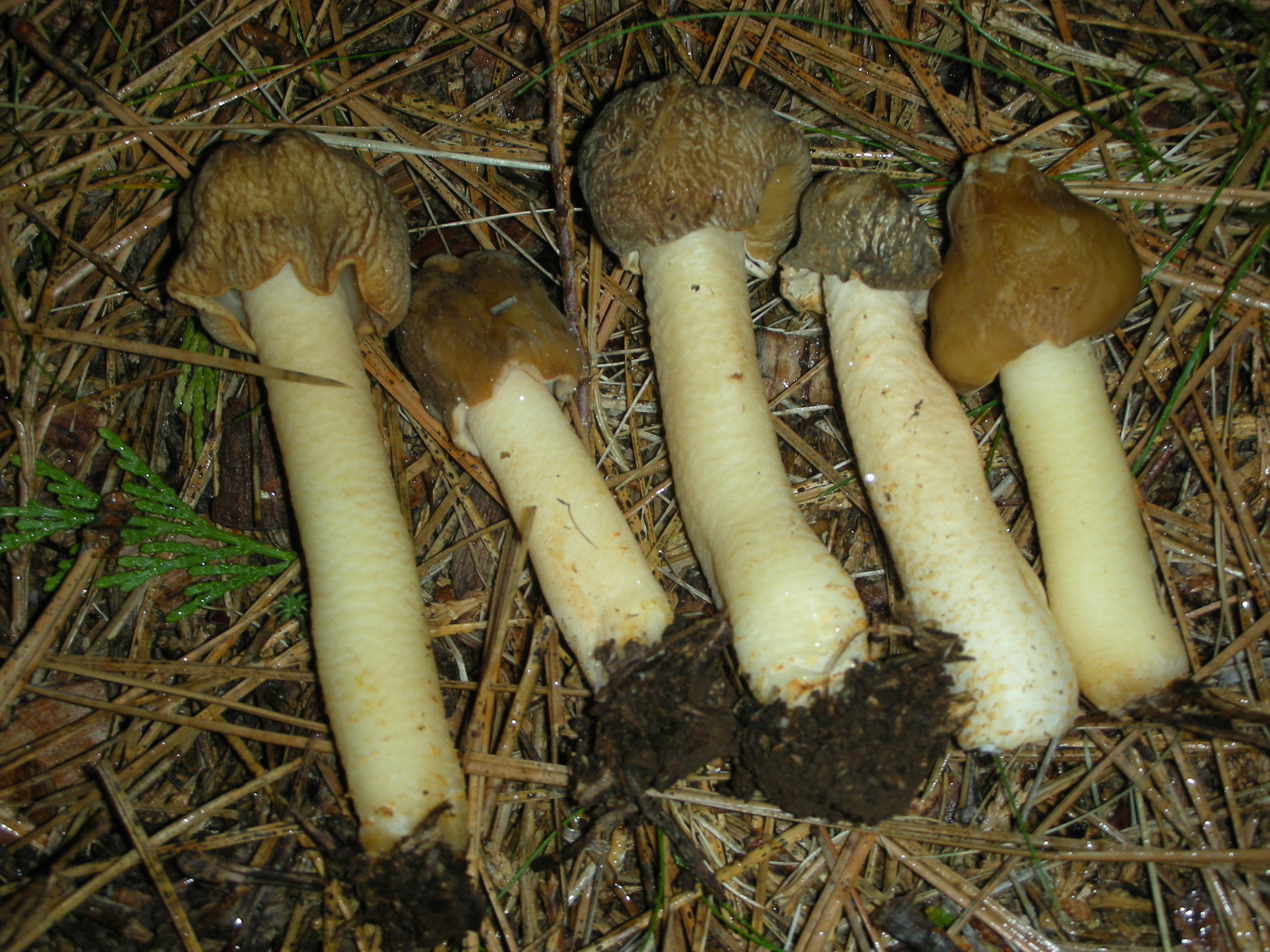

Scientific classification
- Kingdom: Fungi
- Division: Ascomycota
- Class: Pezizomycetes
- Order: Pezizales
- Family: Morchellaceae
- Genus: Verpa
- Species: V. conica

Binomial name
- Verpa conica (O.F.Müll.) Sw. (1815)

Synonyms
- Phallus conicus O.F.Müll. (1775); Leotia conica (O.F.Müll.) Pers. (1801); Relhanum conicum (O.F.Müll.) Gray (1821); Monka conica (O.F.Müll.) Kuntze (1898)

= Verpa conica =

Species of fungus

Verpa conica Mycological characteristics
- Glebal hymenium
- Cap is ovate
- Hymenium is free
- Stipe is bare
- Edibility is edible but not recommended

Verpa conica, commonly known as the bell morel or the early morel, is a species of fungus in the family Morchellaceae. Sometimes mistaken for a true morel, this species is characterized by a cap resembling a thimble that is freely attached to the stipe.

== Taxonomy ==
The species was first described under the name Phallus conicus by Otto Friedrich Müller in 1775. Later authors have moved the taxon to various genera: Persoon placed in Leotia in 1801, Samuel Frederick Gray transferred it Relhanum in 1821, while Otto Kuntze moved it to Monka in 1898. The species was transferred to Verpa by Olof Swartz in 1814.

== Description ==
Fruiting bodies have a smooth cap that is bell-shaped or conical, and 1 to 4 cm (3/8 to 1 5/8 in) tall and broad; it is attached to the top of the stipe only, the margin of the cap is free – hanging like a skirt. The underside of the cap is tan to dark brown in color. The stipe, which measures 2 to 12 cm (3/4 to 4 3/4 in) by 1 to 3 cm (3/8 to 1 1/8 in) thick, is whitish and either equal or slightly thicker than the base; the stipe surface is either smooth or slightly fuzzy. It is generally hollow, although young specimens may be filled with cotton-like hyphae. The flesh is thin and brittle, and the cap can be easily broken off the stipe.

David Arora notes that sometimes a variety with a wrinkled cap can be found, somewhat resembling a Gyromitra.

=== Microscopic features ===
The spores are elliptical, smooth, colorless, and hyaline, with dimensions of 28–34 by 15–19 μm. The asci are typically 500–550 by 21–27 μm, and eight spored. The paraphyses are club-shaped, branched, and septate.

=== Similar species ===
Since the cap is free in V. conica, it is easily distinguishable from true morels, which attach at the base of the cap. V. conica mushrooms attach at the top of the cap—so they are even distinguishable from half-free morels (e.g. Morchella semilibera). This mushroom also tends to be filled with a cotton material, whereas morels are hollow all of the way through.

Other similar species include Verpa bohemica, which has a more wrinkled cap, Morchella semilibera, and species of Phallus, which smell of sewage or rotten meat.

== Distribution and habitat ==
The species can be found in North America from the West Coast (from March to June) to the Northeast (from April to May).

It grows singly, scattered, or in groups on the ground in both hardwood and coniferous forests, often in river valleys, or along stream banks. It often fruits in late spring, usually near morel season. It has been reported to fruit abundantly in the chaparral scrubland in southern California.

== Uses ==
=== As a food product ===
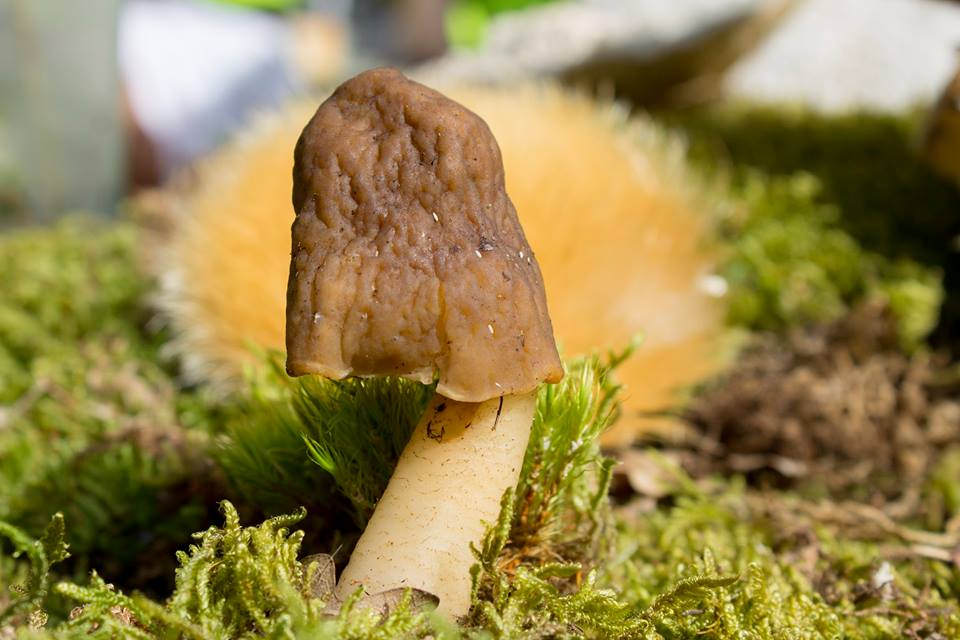
The free hanging cap of V. conica

Verpa species should always be cooked thoroughly and, if being eaten for the first time, restricted to small portions to test tolerance.

=== As an antioxidant ===
There is evidence that V. conica may contain compounds that function as an antioxidant. While not necessarily recommended for consumption, it is possible that an extract from V. conica could be used as an antioxidant supplement. A study done on the antioxidant activity of various mushroom species indicates that this species of Verpa does particularly well in reducing power. They also do well in binding iron, which may be related to peroxidation protection.
