= Mary Cloyd Burnley Stifler =

American botanist and botanical collector (1876–1956)

- Born: Mary Cloyd Burnley; November 7, 1876; Williamsport, Pennsylvania
- Died: 1956 (aged 79–80)
- Education: Women’s College of Baltimore
- Spouse: James Madison Stifler
- Children: 2
- Scientific career
- Fields: Mycology, Chemistry

Mary Cloyd Burnley Stifler (7 November 1876 – August 1956) was a 20th century botanist with a specialization in mycology.

== Early life and education ==
Born in Williamsport, Pennsylvania in 1876 to Charles W. and Sallie H. (Updegraff) Burnley, Cloyd Burnley was raised in Willamsport along with her sister, Lucy Burnley. Cloyd Burnley's sister married Rev. James Madison Stifler, Jr, in 1900. Lucy died in 1903, leaving behind two children: James Madison Stifler III and Francis M. Stifler.

Cloyd Burnley attended Williamsport Dickinson Seminary (now Lycoming College). She graduated from Goucher College in 1897. She continued as a graduate student at her alma mater before moving to Vassar College as an assistant. She completed her master's degree in chemistry at the Women's College of Baltimore in 1899 while continuing to teach chemistry at Vassar. In 1908 she returned to Bryn Mawr as a research fellow and stayed until 1909. She co-authored two publications with fellow Bryn Mawr professor EP Kohler before he moved to Harvard University in 1910. While no record of Cloyd Burnley obtaining a doctorate exists, the State Microscopical Society of Illinois announced "Mrs. C.B. Stifler, Ph.D., will speak on little known "Flowerless Plants." Cloyd Burnley's work in mycology comes mostly from her time as a resident of Evanston, Illinois, when her husband held an appointment at the University of Chicago from 1931 to 1940, although a lack of records makes her position at the institution unclear. She served as the president of the Chicago Chapter of the Goucher College Alumnae Association.

== Career ==
Though a chemist by training, Cloyd Burnley's work was primarily within the field of mycology. Cloyd Burnley was the first to describe the Tuberaceae genus, a fungal genus containing truffles.

In 1944, Cloyd Burnley gave a "rare and extensive collection" of fungal specimens to her alma mater, Goucher College. According to the Evening Sun, Cloyd Burnley's "special hobby is the collection, identification and study of the habits of representatives of fungi. In certain groups of the series Mrs. Stifler has become a recognized authority." Over 90 different fungal families were a part of the collection donated to the college. Her samples were intended for use in teaching students about mycorrhiza.

Over 2,600 specimens attributed to Cloyd Burnley Stifler are housed at 13 different academic institutions. Her samples come from locations in Illinois as well as Florida, where she and her husband retired in the 1940s. She collected, described, and illustrated not just fungi but slime molds and mosses as well.

=== Scientific publications ===
1. Stifler, Cloyd Burnley (1950) The use of the microscope in the study of mosses. Micro-Notes V (1): 22-28.
2. Stifler, Cloyd Burnley (1949) Myxomycetes, Mycetozoa, or Slime Molds . Micro-Notes IV (3): 52-65.
3. Stifler, Cloyd Burnley (1941) A new genus of Hypocreales. Mycologica 33(1): 82-86.
4. Stifler, Cloyd Burnley (1937) A new species of Tuberaceae for America. Mycologica 29(3): 325-326.
5. Kohler, E. P. and M. Cloyd Burnley (1910) Reaction between unsaturated compounds and organic magnesium compounds. XIII. Derivatives of cyclohexane. American Chemical Journal 43(5): 412-417.
6. Kohler, E. P., G. L. Heritage, M. C. Burnley (1910) The Friedel and Crafts reaction with chlorides of unsaturated acids. American Chemical Journal 44(1): 60-75.

== Personal life ==
Cloyd Burnley married her sister's widower in 1909. Together, the couple had two children: Lucy and Cloyd. Cloyd Burnley's husband, a graduate of Crozer Theological Seminary in Upland, Pennsylvania, was the senior minister at the First Baptist Church in Evanston, Illinois from 1909 to 1931. The couple moved to Florida in 1942, where her husband died in 1949. Cloyd Burnley died in 1956 at age 79 in Bradenton, Florida.
