= Kalapuya (disambiguation) =

The Kalapuya are a Native American ethnic group native to what is now Oregon. Kalapuya may refer to:

- Kalapuya language, their language
- Kalapuya (fungus) – a genus of truffle-like fungi
- the Treaty with the Kalapuya, etc. is also known as the Kalapuya Treaty
