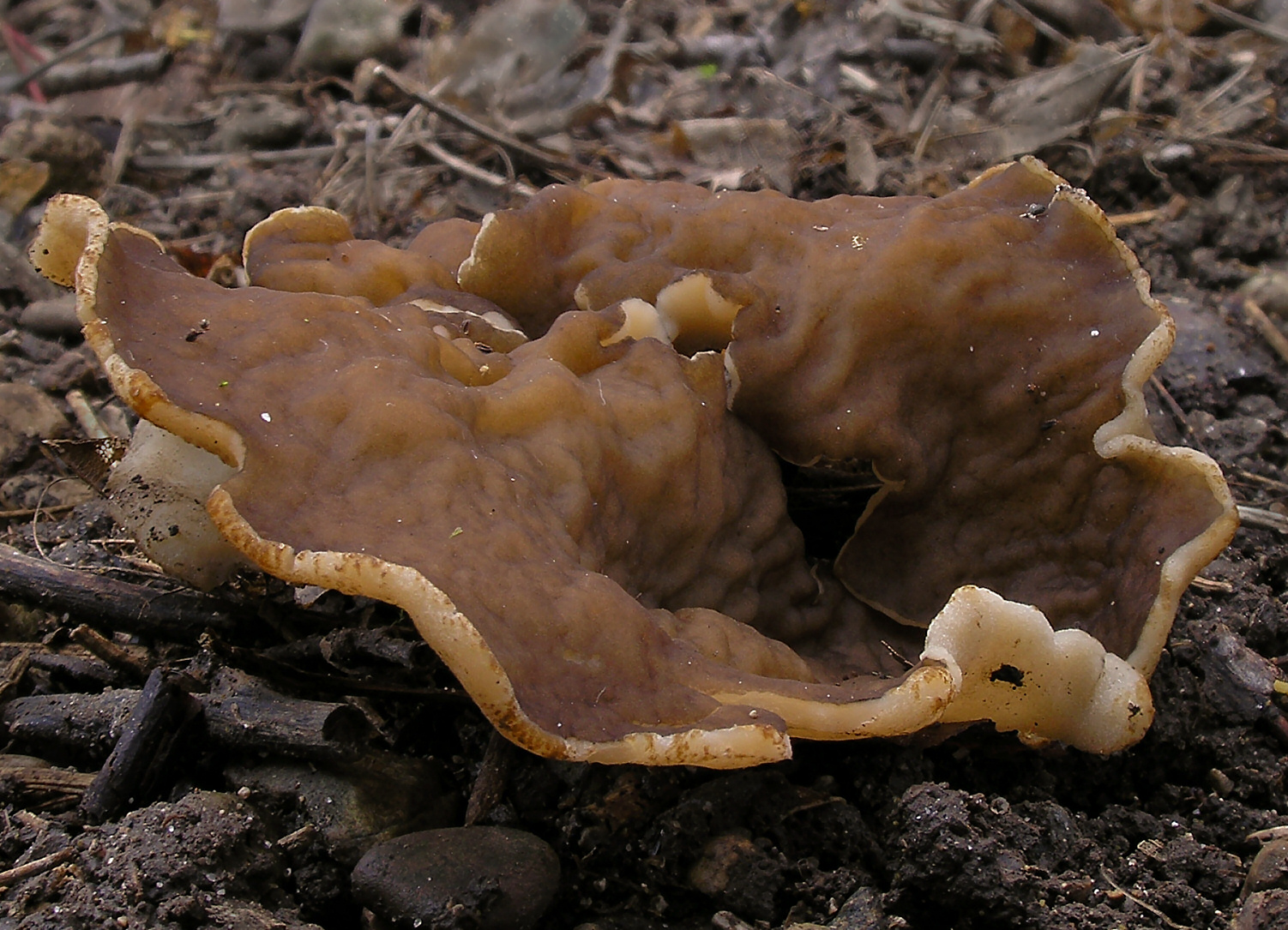
- Mature specimen

Scientific classification
- Kingdom: Fungi
- Division: Ascomycota
- Class: Pezizomycetes
- Order: Pezizales
- Family: Morchellaceae
- Genus: Disciotis
- Species: D. venosa

Binomial name
- Disciotis venosa (Pers.) Boud. (1893)

Synonyms
- Peziza venosa Pers. (1801); Discina venosa (Pers.) Fr. (1822); Discina venosa var. rabenhorstii Sacc. (1889); Disciotis venosa f. radicans Perco (1994)

= Disciotis venosa =

Species of fungus

Disciotis venosa
- Mycological characteristics
- Smooth hymenium
- Cap is infundibuliform
- Hymenium attachment is not applicable
- Stipe is bare or lacks a stipe
- Spore print is cream to yellow
- Ecology is saprotrophic
- Edibility is edible or choice

Disciotis venosa, commonly known as the bleach cup, veiny cup fungus, or the cup morel is a species of fungus in the family Morchellaceae. Fruiting from April, they are often difficult to locate because of their undistinguished brown color.

Found in North America and Europe, D. venosa appears to favor banks and slopes and sheltered sites. Although edible, it may be difficult to identify without microscopy.

== Taxonomy ==
The fungus was first described as Peziza venosa by Christian Hendrik Persoon in 1801, from collections made near Klagenfurt, Austria. Jean Louis Émile Boudier transferred it to Disciotis in 1893.

Bruno Perco described the form Disciotis venosa f. radicans from collections made in Italy.

The specific epithet venosa, meaning "veined", refers to the veins on the inner cup surface. Common names for the species include bleach cup, veiny cup fungus, and cup morel.

== Description ==
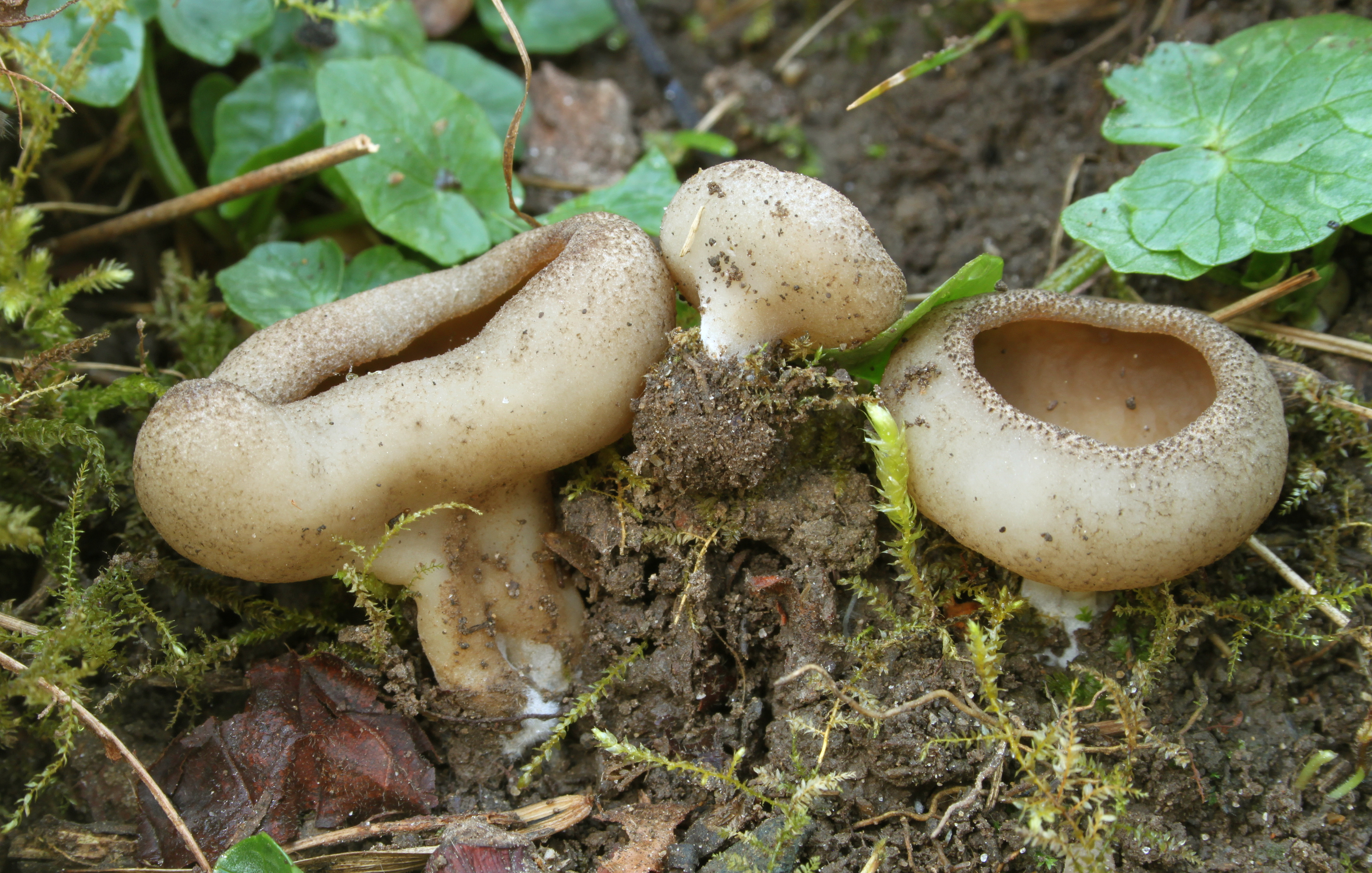
Young, cup-shaped fruit bodies

Fruit bodies produced by this fungus are cup- or disc-shaped, up to 20 centimetres (8 inches) wide. The interior surface of the cup, the hymenium, is dark brown. It tends to become folded into vein-like markings with age, hence the specific epithet venosa. The exterior surface is a whitish color, covered with pustules. There is a short stipe that anchors the cup to the ground. Although young fruiting bodies are cup-shaped, when they are 7 to 8 cm (2 3/4 to 3 1/4 in) in diameter, the apothecia split and flatten down to lie in the soil. They are very brittle. The fruit bodies have been estimated to have a lifespan of up to 12 weeks. The flesh of the fungus has a bleach-like odor when it is broken.

=== Microscopic characteristics ===
The spore are elliptical and smooth, with dimensions of 21–24 by 12–14 μm. The asci (spore-bearing cells), are 370–400 by 18–20 μm, while the paraphyses are stout and club-shaped, with tips up to 12 μm wide.

=== Similar species ===
Species that may resemble D. venosa most notably include several species of genus Peziza, belonging to the family of true cup fungi (unlike D. venosa which is actually a morel). Some poisonous ones are also included. Peziza species generally lack an odor, have thinner flesh than D. venosa, and will turn a dark blue color if a drop of iodine solution is placed on it. Additionally, the tips of asci in Peziza species will stain blue with iodine, a feature that can be observed with a light microscope.

Another lookalike, the closely related "thick cup" or "pig's ears" Discina ancilis (also known as Discina perlata or Gyromitra perlata), is edible (or at least not poisonous), has an inner cup surface that is comparatively reddish-brown, and folded, wrinkled, or sometimes smooth, rather than veined. Its outer cup surface has small tufts of hairs arranged in clumps.

== Distribution and habitat ==
D. venosa is found in North America (between April and June, especially from the Lower Midwest to New York) and Europe (including Bulgaria, Sweden, Spain, and Wales). It also occurs in Turkey, where it is considered critically endangered.

The fungus is typically found growing on the ground among mossy or needle-covered soil around conifers; they are often difficult to notice because their brown color typically blends into the background. They have been noted to prefer to grow on banks or slopes rather than flat areas. This species is also referred to as a "snowbank mushroom" because fruit bodies typically appear around the edges of melting snowbanks. In Europe, the fungus typically fruits from March to May.

== Uses ==
D. venosa is a choice edible mushroom, although one author notes that only collectors who have the equipment to check its microscopic properties should consider consuming the species, as it may be confused with several other brown cup fungi. It may be poisonous unless cooked.
