= Paradoxa (fungus) =

Scientific classification
- Kingdom: Fungi
- Division: Ascomycota
- Class: Pezizomycetes
- Order: Pezizales
- Family: Tuberaceae
- Genus: Paradoxa; Mattir. (1935)

Type species
- Paradoxa monospora Mattir. (1935)

Species
- P. gigantospora; P. monospora; P. sinensis

Genus of fungi

Paradoxa is a genus of truffles in the family Tuberaceae. Originally described by the Italian botanist Oreste Mattirolo in 1935, the genus remained monotypic until a second species P. gigantospora was transferred from Tuber in 2009. A third species, P. sinensis, was also described, representing the second species from China. P. sinensis differs from P. gigantospora by having a somewhat smaller fruit body, and differs from P. monospora by having yellowish to yellow-brown ascomata.
