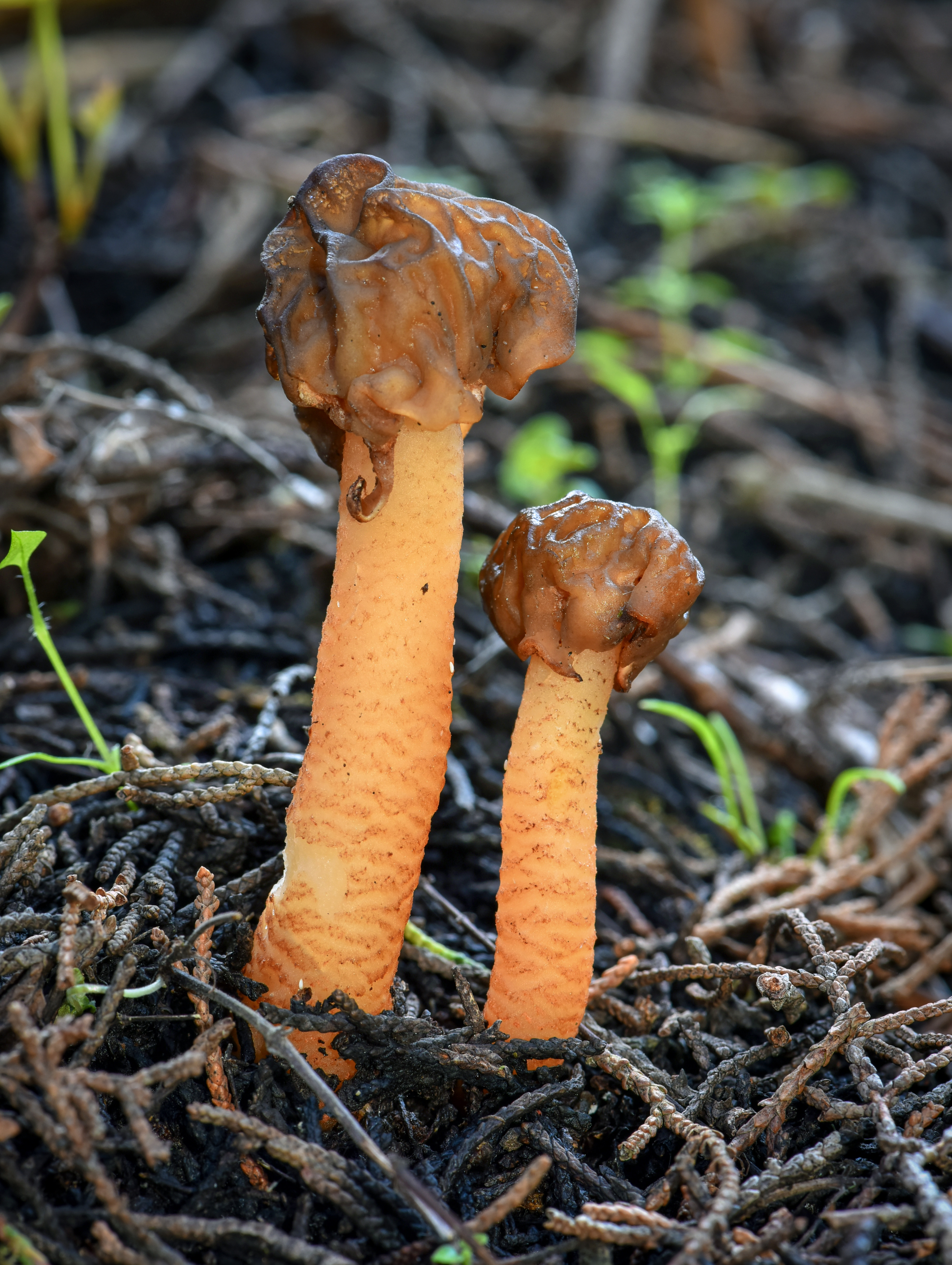
- V. conica

Scientific classification
- Kingdom: Fungi
- Division: Ascomycota
- Class: Pezizomycetes
- Order: Pezizales
- Family: Morchellaceae
- Genus: Verpa; Sw. (1815)

Type species
- Verpa conica (O.F.Müll.) Sw. (1815)

Synonyms
- Monka Adans. (1763); Relhanum Gray (1821)

= Verpa =

Genus of fungi

Verpa is a genus of ascomycete fungi related to the morels. Resembling the latter genus in edibility and form, the common name early morels is popular. There are five species in the widespread genus.

== Taxonomy ==
Analysis of the ribosomal DNA of many of the Pezizales showed the genus Verpa to be closely related to the genus Morchella, and also Disciotis. Thus the three genera are now included in the family Morchellaceae.

== Species ==
Species include:

- Verpa bohemica - early morel.

Edible if well cooked. Found in North America, in early spring, April–May in damp places, under poplar

- Verpa conica - bell or conic morel.

Edible if well cooked. Found in North America, in orchards, in eastern Canada

- Verpa digitaliformis
- Verpa krombholzii
- Verpa speciosa

=== Etymology ===
Verpa comes from the Latin word for erection
