= Labyrinthomyces =

Scientific classification
- Kingdom: Fungi
- Division: Ascomycota
- Class: Pezizomycetes
- Order: Pezizales
- Family: Tuberaceae
- Genus: Labyrinthomyces; Boedijn (1939)

Type species
- Labyrinthomyces steenisii Boedijn (1939)

Species
- L. donkii L. phymatodeus L. steenisii L. tessellatus L. turbinatus L. varius L. westraliensis

Genus of fungi

Labyrinthomyces is a genus of truffles in the Tuberaceae family. The genus, circumscribed by Karel Bernard Boedijn in 1939, contains seven species found in Australia.
