= Joan Dingley =

New Zealand mycologist

Joan Dingley OBE
- Born: 14 May 1916; Auckland, New Zealand
- Died: 1 January 2008 (aged 91); Auckland, New Zealand
- Awards: Honorary DSc of Massey University
- Scientific career
- Fields: Plant pathology and taxonomic mycology
- Author abbrev. (botany): Dingley

Joan Marjorie Dingley OBE (14 May 1916 – 1 January 2008) was one of the pioneer women of New Zealand science. She worked for the DSIR Plant Diseases Division from 1941 to 1976, becoming the head of mycology. She was a major research scientist in New Zealand for both laboratory and field-based plant pathology, and for taxonomic mycology.

== Early life ==
Dingley was born in Parnell, Auckland on the 14 May 1916 to Harriet Griffiths and Captain Thomas Dingley. She was the second-youngest child in the family, who re-located to the Auckland suburb of Remuera in the early 1920s, where Dingley would live for the rest of her life. Her father died in 1925, when she was nine.

Dingley's mother was an enthusiastic gardener and encouraged her daughter's interest in plants. This interest was also encouraged by Dingley's schools, including the Ladies' College of Remuera and Auckland Diocesan School for Girls. Her father was a sea captain, which further piqued her interest in exotic plants as he would bring back a variety of foods for the family to eat.

Dingley was given the choice between studying or staying at home, as she could not afford to do both. She decided to study science at Auckland University College, majoring in zoology and biology. She graduated in 1941 with an MSc, with her thesis focusing on ferns.

== Life and career ==
Her research interests lay with the taxonomy of ascomycetes, especially the Hypocreales. She rapidly became a world authority on these fungi. About 30 species of fungi have dingleyae as their species name, and the genus Dingleya was also named after her.

During the Second World War, Dingley commenced her 35-year career at Mount Albert in the herbarium due to a shortage of males who were away fighting in the war. For a long time she was the only botanist in government services. She worked on techniques on mould-proofing tents and radio equipment for troops in the Pacific. As there was not much literature on this topic, Dingley and her colleagues had to resort to German texts, which entailed her learning German.

She wrote a major, comprehensive list of New Zealand plant diseases, Records of plant diseases in New Zealand, published in 1969.

Dingley aided in newfound knowledge on mycology by leading multiple projects such as finding toxins that caused eczema in sheep and cattle, studying international plant diseases, training law enforcement on identifying cannabis and opium plants, and developing the New Zealand Fungal Herbarium, building specimen numbers from 4,000 to 35,000 by the time she retired.

Dingley also had a love for horticulture and gardening. She was a prime mover in the establishment of the Auckland Regional Botanic Gardens, and became an honorary life member of the ‘Friends’ of the gardens.

After World War II ended, she started a research group dedicated to learning more about New Zealand fungi. She would travel to the West Coast to collect specimens, and enjoyed these solo trips. She credits her self-sufficiency and independence as a major advantage to her work.

Dingley faced sexism at Mount Albert as there were only a few women scientists employed, with women not being accepted into morning tea rooms, and women's facilities being very basic. She noted that this sexism only came about post war, as she was treated with respect during the war years.

Dingley established the Manurewa Botanical Gardens, where a library was opened in 1992. She also introduced the first holder of the James Cook Fellowship to New Zealand's sooty mould, which grows on ti trees.

== Publications ==
- Brien, R.M. et al. (1951) A revised list of plant diseases recorded in New Zealand / by R.M. Brien and Joan M. Dingley. Gisborne [N.Z.]: Te Rau Press (Bulletin (New Zealand. Department of Scientific and Industrial Research); no. 101).
- Dingley, Joan M (1960), "New records of fungous diseases in New Zealand 1958-59", New Zealand Journal of Agricultural Research, 3 (3): 461–467, doi:10.1080/00288233.1960.10426630
- Dingley, J.M. et al. (1969) Records of plant diseases in New Zealand / by J.M. Dingley. Wellington, N.Z.: Govt. Printer (Bulletin (New Zealand. Department of Scientific and Industrial Research); 192).
- Dingley, J. M.; Fullerton, R. A.; McKenzie, E. H. C. (1981), Survey of agricultural pests and diseases : records of fungi, bacteria, algae and angiosperms pathogenic on plants in Cook Islands Fiji, Kiribati, Niue, Tonga, Tuvalu and Western Samoa, United Nations Development Programme, pp. 1–485, Wikidata Q136471524
- Mckenzie, E. H. C.; Dingley, J. M. (1995), "New plant disease records in New Zealand: Miscellaneous fungal pathogens III", Mycology and Plant Pathology, 34 (2): 263–272, doi:10.1080/0028825X.1996.10410690

== Honours and awards ==
Dingley was awarded an honorary DSc by Massey University in 1994. She was appointed an Officer of the Order of the British Empire in the 1995 Queen's Birthday Honours, for services to botany. In 2004, Landcare Research named one of its Auckland laboratories the JM Dingley Microbiology Laboratory in her honour. She attended the naming ceremony.

In 2017, Dingley was selected as one of the Royal Society Te Apārangi's "150 women in 150 words", celebrating the contributions of women to knowledge in New Zealand.
