= Costantinella =

Scientific classification
- Domain: Eukaryota
- Kingdom: Fungi
- Division: Ascomycota
- Class: Pezizomycetes
- Order: Pezizales
- Family: Morchellaceae
- Genus: Costantinella; Matr., 1892

Genus of fungi

Costantinella is a genus of anamorphic fungi in the family Morchellaceae and class Pezizomycetes

== Species ==
The Global Biodiversity Information Facility lists:

1. Costantinella athrix Nannf.
2. Costantinella clavata Hol.-Jech.
3. Costantinella cristata Matr.
4. Costantinella micheneri (Berk. & M.A.Curtis) S.Hughes
5. Costantinella palmicola M.K.M.Wong, Yanna, Goh & K.D.Hyde
6. Costantinella phragmitis M.K.M.Wong, Yanna, Goh & K.D.Hyde
7. Costantinella terrestris (Link) S.Hughes

== Ecology and distribution ==
Pinus contorta Loudon and Picea glauca (Moench) Voss are associated with Costantinella micheneri
