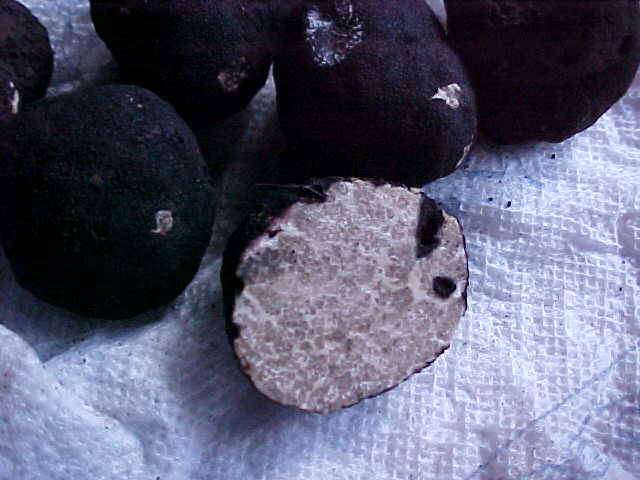
- Leucangium carthusianum

Scientific classification
- Kingdom: Fungi
- Division: Ascomycota
- Class: Pezizomycetes
- Order: Pezizales
- Family: Morchellaceae
- Genus: Leucangium; Quél. (1883)

Type species
- Leucangium ophthalmosporum Quél. (1883)

Species
- L. carthusianum L. ophthalmosporum

= Leucangium =

Genus of fungi

Leucangium is a genus of ascomycete fungi. The genus was circumscribed by French mycologist Lucien Quélet in 1883. Although classified in the Helvellaceae in the past (e.g., in Dictionary of the Fungi, 10th edition, 2008), molecular analysis indicates it is closely related to the genus Fischerula and Imaia, and therefore must be placed in the Morchellaceae. The genus includes two species, Leucangium ophthalmosporum Quél. (the type of the genus) and L. carthusianum (Tul. & C. Tul.) Paol., and both of them produce sequestrate (fully or partly underground) ascoma, globose to ellipsoidal ascus (inamyloid and eight-spored), and dark olive-colored to grayish green, smooth, fusiform ascospores.
