= Reddellomyces =

Scientific classification
- Kingdom: Fungi
- Division: Ascomycota
- Class: Pezizomycetes
- Order: Pezizales
- Family: Tuberaceae
- Genus: Reddellomyces; Trappe, Castellano & Malajczuk (1992)

Type species
- Reddellomyces westraliensis (G.W.Beaton & Malajczuk) Trappe, Castellano & Malajczuk 1992

Species
- R. donkii R. magnisporus R. parvulosporus R. westraliensis

Genus of fungi

Reddellomyces is a genus of truffle-like fungi in the Tuberaceae family. The genus, circumscribed in 1992, contains four species found in Australasia and the Mediterranean.
