= Dingleya =

Scientific classification
- Kingdom: Fungi
- Division: Ascomycota
- Class: Pezizomycetes
- Order: Pezizales
- Family: Tuberaceae
- Genus: Dingleya; Trappe (1979)

Type species
- Dingleya verrucosa Trappe (1979)

Species
- D. geometrica D. phymatodea D. tectiascus D. tessellata D. turbinata D. verrucosa

Genus of fungi

Dingleya is a genus of truffles in the Tuberaceae family. The genus contains seven species found in Australia. Circumscribed by James Trappe in 1979, the genus is named after New Zealand mycologist Joan Dingley.
