= Fischerula =

Scientific classification
- Kingdom: Fungi
- Division: Ascomycota
- Class: Pezizomycetes
- Order: Pezizales
- Family: Morchellaceae
- Genus: Fischerula; Mattir. (1928)

Type species
- Fischerula macrospora

Species
- F. macrospora; F. subcaulis

Genus of fungi

Fischerula is a genus of two truffle-like fungi in the family Morchellaceae. First described from central Italy by Oreste Mattirolo in 1928, the genus name honors Swiss mycologist Eduard Fischer. The type species Fischerula macrospora is known only from Italy, while Fischerula subcaulis is found in coniferous and mixed forests of Oregon and Washington.
