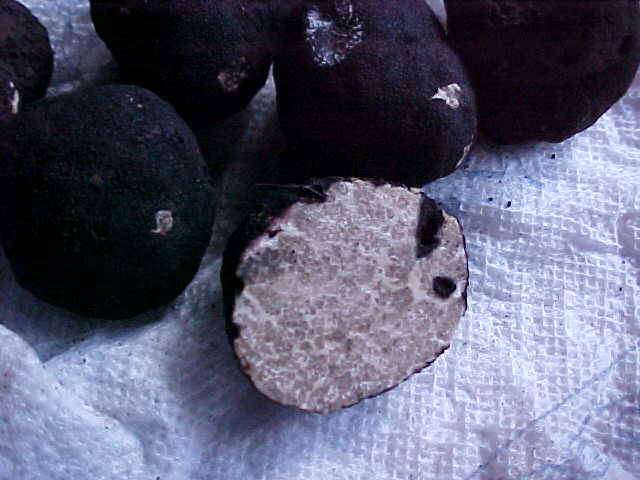

Scientific classification
- Kingdom: Fungi
- Division: Ascomycota
- Class: Pezizomycetes
- Order: Pezizales
- Family: Morchellaceae
- Genus: Leucangium
- Species: L. carthusianum

Binomial name
- Leucangium carthusianum (Tul. & C.Tul.) Paol. (1889)

Synonyms
- Picoa carthusiana Tul. & C.Tul. (1862)

= Leucangium carthusianum =

Species of fungus

Leucangium carthusianum
- Mycological characteristics
- Glebal hymenium
- No distinct cap
- Hymenium attachment is irregular or not applicable
- Lacks a stipe
- Spore print is white
- Ecology is mycorrhizal
- Edibility is choice

Leucangium carthusianum is a species of ascomycete fungus. It is commonly known as the Oregon black truffle. It is found in the Pacific Northwest region of North America, where it grows in an ectomycorrhizal association with Douglas-fir. It is commercially collected, usually assisted by a specially trained truffle dog. Mature fruiting bodies can be dug up mostly during winter, but the season can extend from September through April.

== Description ==
The fruit bodies grow up to 5 centimetres (2 in) across. On the outside, they are dark brown and rough to smooth. They are sometimes mistaken for coal lumps. Inside, the gleba is gray to brownish and separated into pockets by veins. The odor is pungent and fruity, usually resembling pineapple.

== Edibility ==
Leucangium carthusianum is a good edible mushroom. It can be prepared similarly to Oregon white and European truffles; it is typically shaved raw on top of a dish to add its complex musky aroma.
