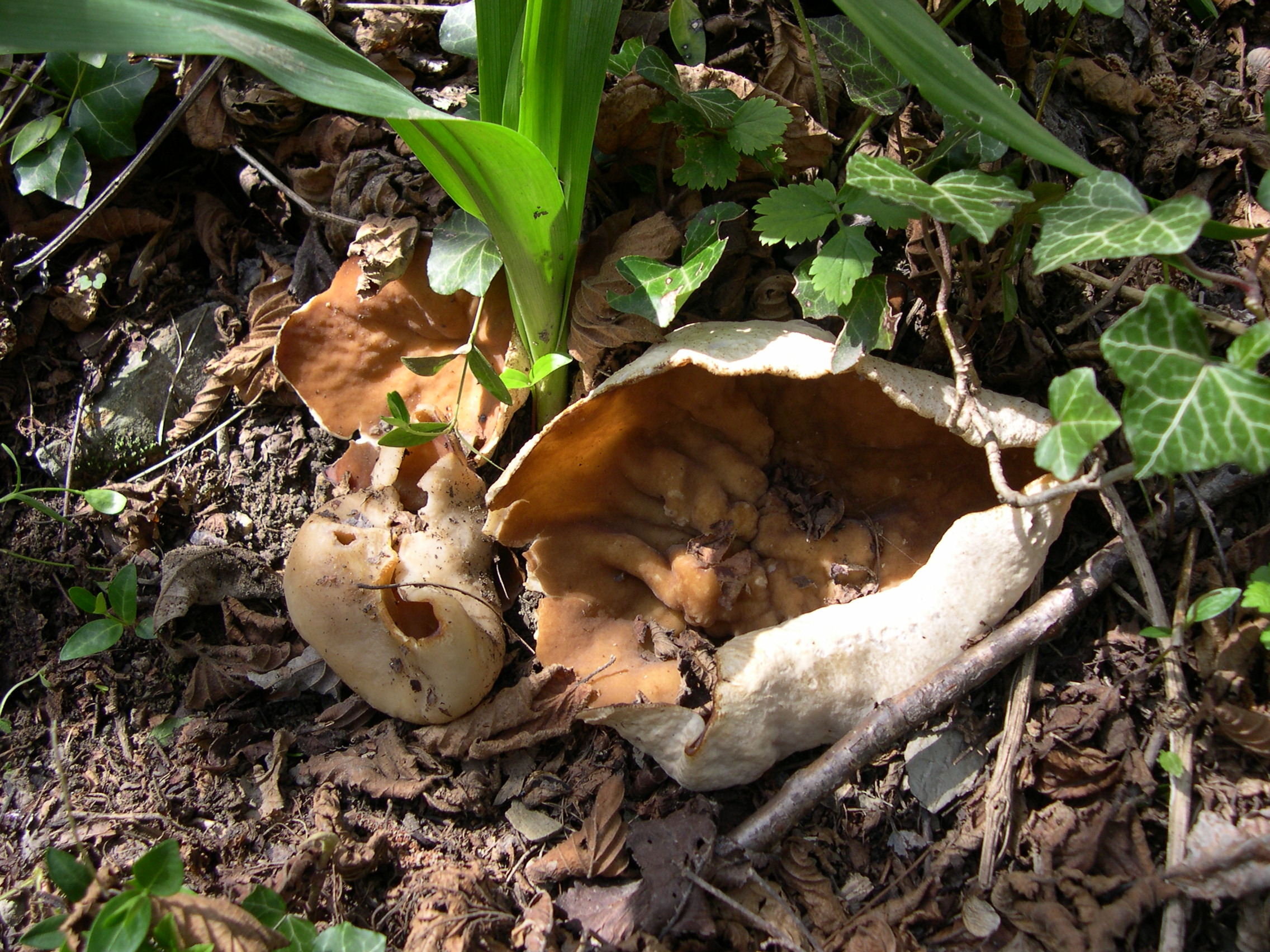
- Disciotis venosa

Scientific classification
- Kingdom: Fungi
- Division: Ascomycota
- Class: Pezizomycetes
- Order: Pezizales
- Family: Morchellaceae
- Genus: Disciotis; Boud. (1885)

Type species
- Disciotis venosa (Pers.) Arnould

= Disciotis =

Genus of fungi

Disciotis is a genus of fungi in the family Morchellaceae. Members of this family, characterized by their cup- or bowl-shaped apothecia, have a widespread distribution, especially in northern temperate regions.

== Description ==
Disciotis has a cupulate (cup-shaped) pileus with vein-like hymenial folds and a small to non-existent stipe.

== Species ==
The type species is Disciotis venosa, originally described as Peziza venosa by Christian Hendrik Persoon in 1801. Other species described in the genus include:

- Disciotis ferruginascens Boud.
- Disciotis maturescens Boud. (1891)
- Disciotis rufescens R. Heim (1934)

It has been suggested that these species (and variants not listed above) all represent a single, morphologically variable species.

There is confusion about the names but the genus also includes:

- Disciotis venosa
