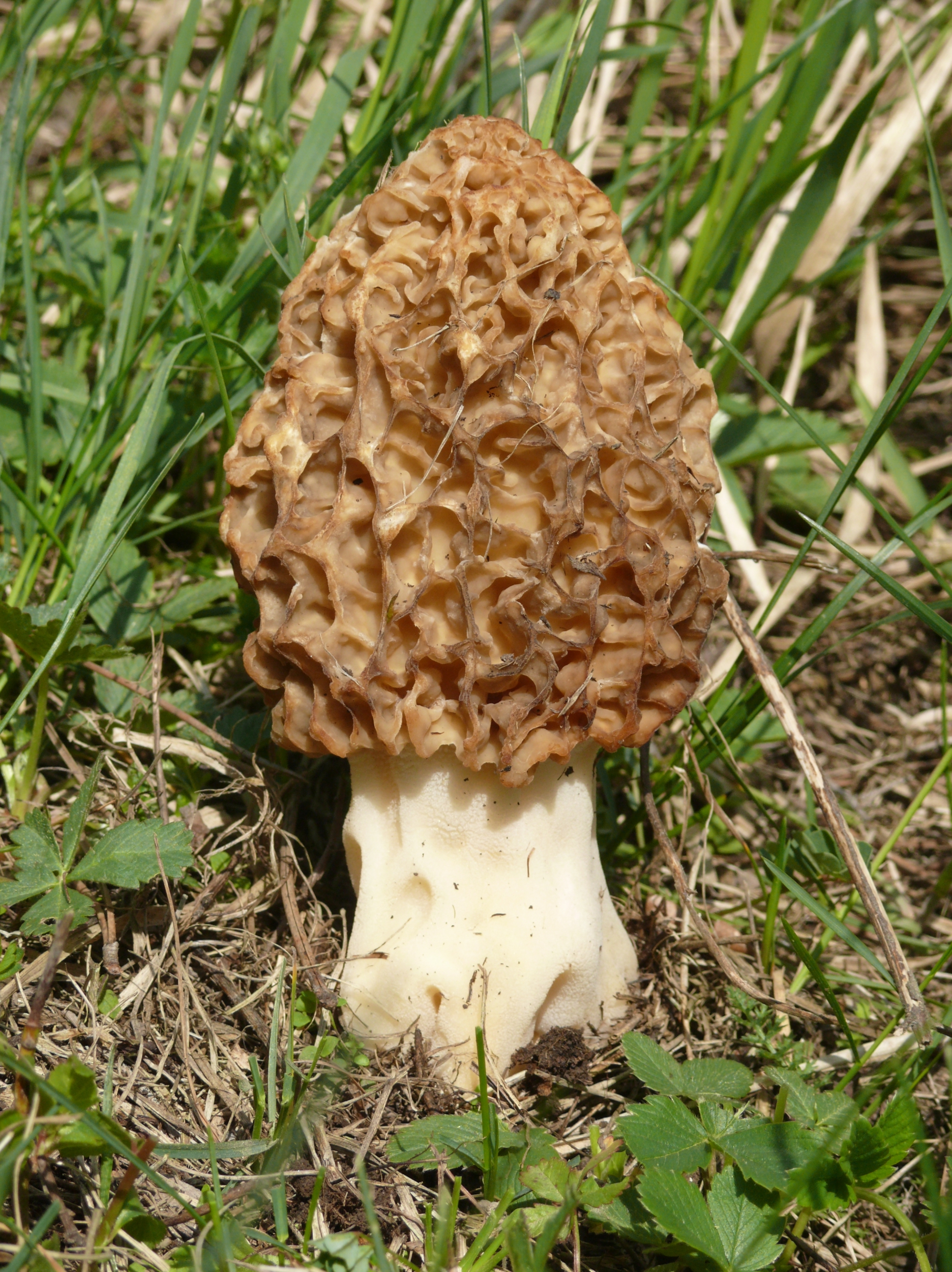
- Morchella esculenta

Scientific classification
- Kingdom: Fungi
- Division: Ascomycota
- Class: Pezizomycetes
- Order: Pezizales
- Family: Morchellaceae; Rchb. (1834)

Type genus
- Morchella Dill. ex Pers. (1794)

Genera
- see text

= Morchellaceae =

Family of fungi

The Morchellaceae are a family of ascomycete fungi in the order Pezizales. According to a standard reference work, the family has contained at least 49 species distributed among four genera. However, in 2012, five genera that produce ascoma that are sequestrate and hypogeous were added. The best-known members are the highly regarded and commercially picked true morels of the genus Morchella, the thimble morels of the genus Verpa, and a genus of cup-shaped fungi Disciotis. The remaining four genera produce the sequestrate fruit bodies.

Analysis of the ribosomal DNA of many of the Pezizales showed the three genera Verpa, Morchella, and Disciotis to be closely related. Thus they are now included in the family Morchellaceae.

== Genera ==
Costantinella (anamorph)
Disciotis (terrestrial)
Morchella (terrestrial)
Verpa (terrestrial)
Kalapuya (hypogeous)
Imaia (hypogeous)
Leucangium (hypogeous)
Fischerula (hypogeous)

== Description ==
Other than the anamorph genus Costantinella, the three remaining genera of Morchellaceae are distinguished by ascocarp morphology. Morchella species have an ascocarp with a sponge-like pileus, with a hollow stipe and pileus. Verpa species have a cup-like or thimble-shaped, smooth or wrinkled pileus above a hollow stipe. Disciotis has a cup-like pileus with vein-like hymenial folds and a small or nonexistent stipe. The ascospores are ellipsoid, smooth, and usually hyaline.
