= Truffle =

Fruiting body of a subterranean ascomycete fungus

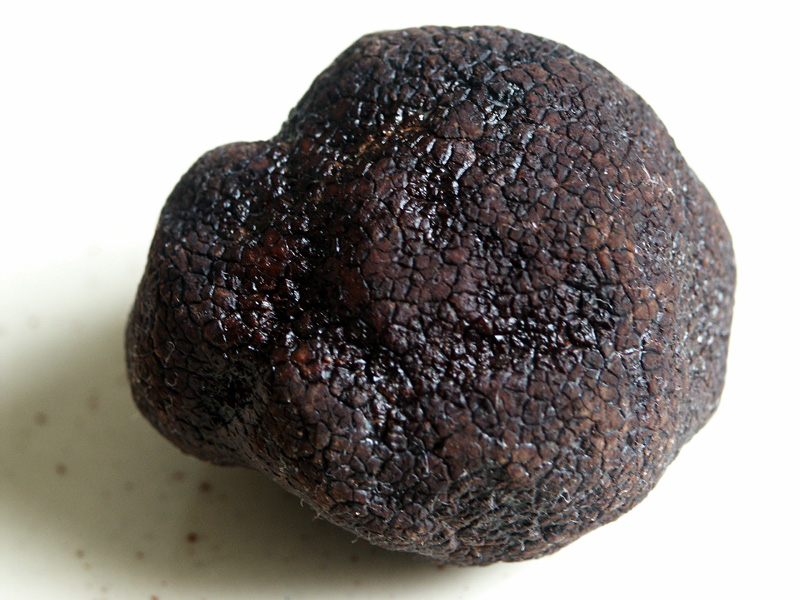
Black truffle (Tuber melanosporum)

A truffle is the fruiting body of a subterranean ascomycete fungus, one of the species of the genus Tuber. More than one hundred other genera of fungi are classified as truffles including Geopora, Peziza, Choiromyces, and Leucangium. These genera belong to the class Pezizomycetes and the Pezizales order. Several truffle-like basidiomycetes are excluded from Pezizales, including Rhizopogon and Glomus.

Truffles are ectomycorrhizal fungi, so they are found in close association with tree roots. Spore dispersal is accomplished through fungivores, animals that eat fungi. These fungi have ecological roles in nutrient cycling and drought tolerance.

Some truffle species are prized as food. Edible truffles are used in Italian, French and other national hautes cuisines. Truffles are cultivated and harvested from natural environments.

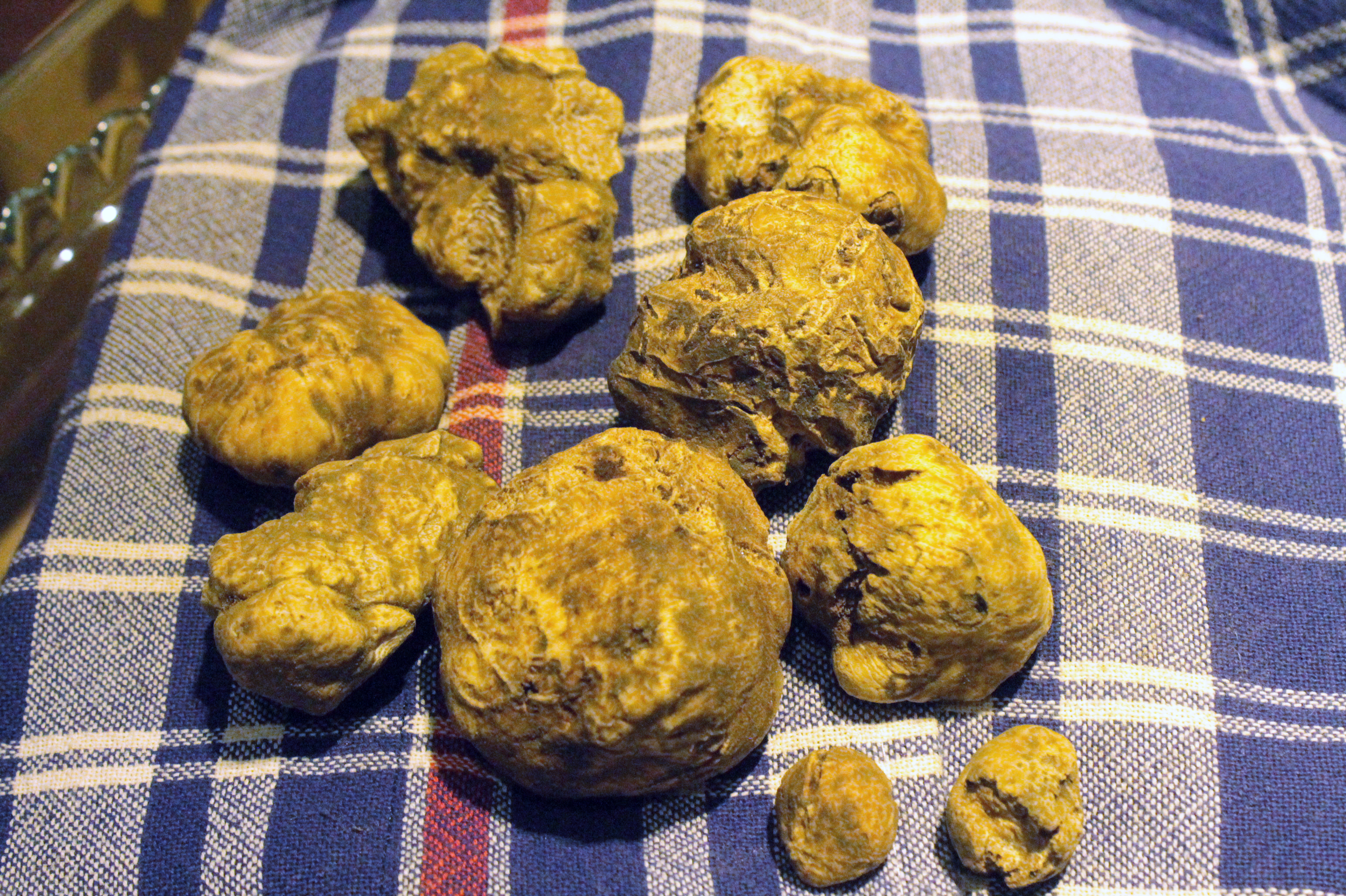
White truffles from San Miniato

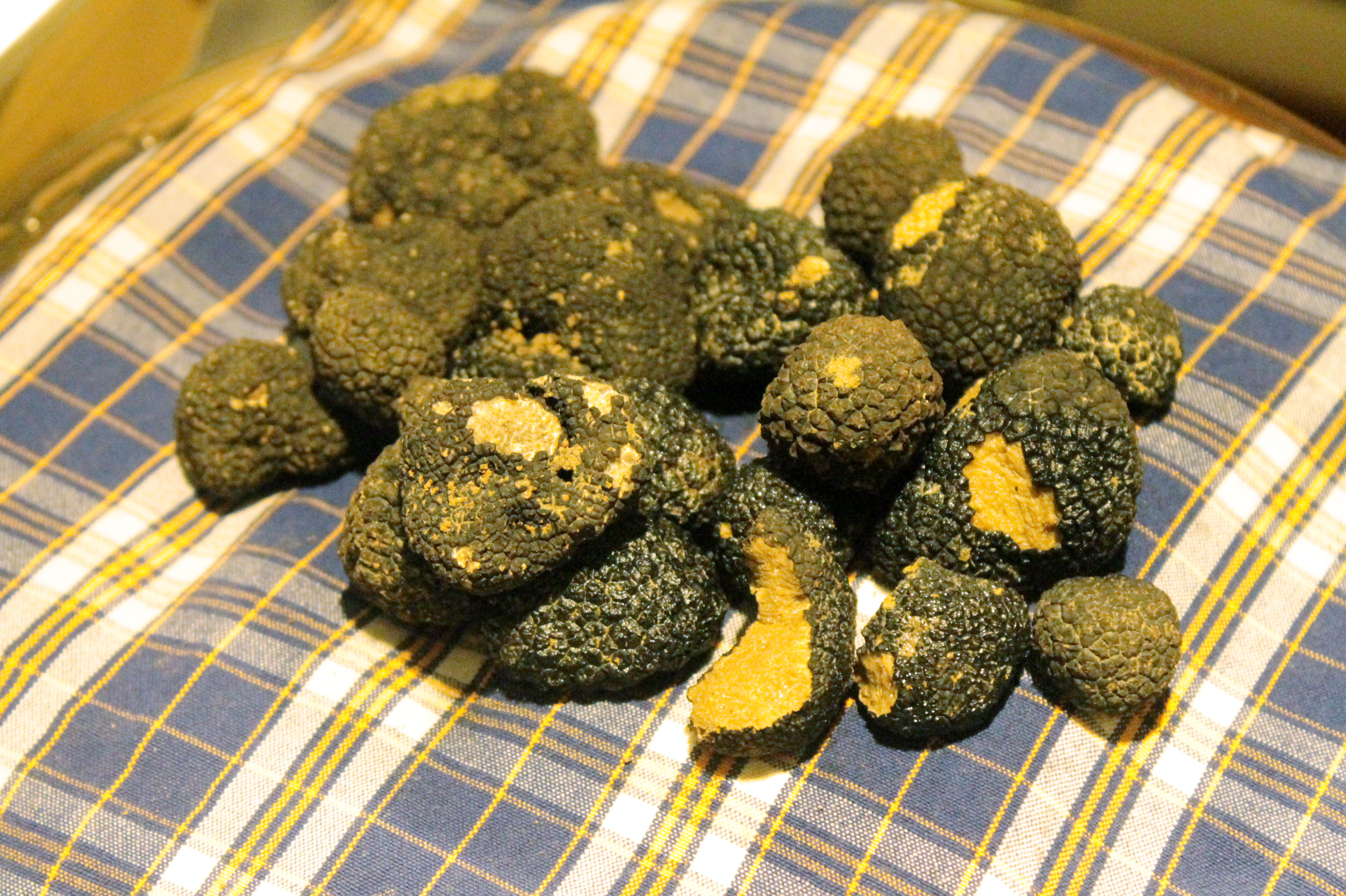
Black truffles from San Miniato

== Taxonomy ==
=== Species ===
==== Black ====
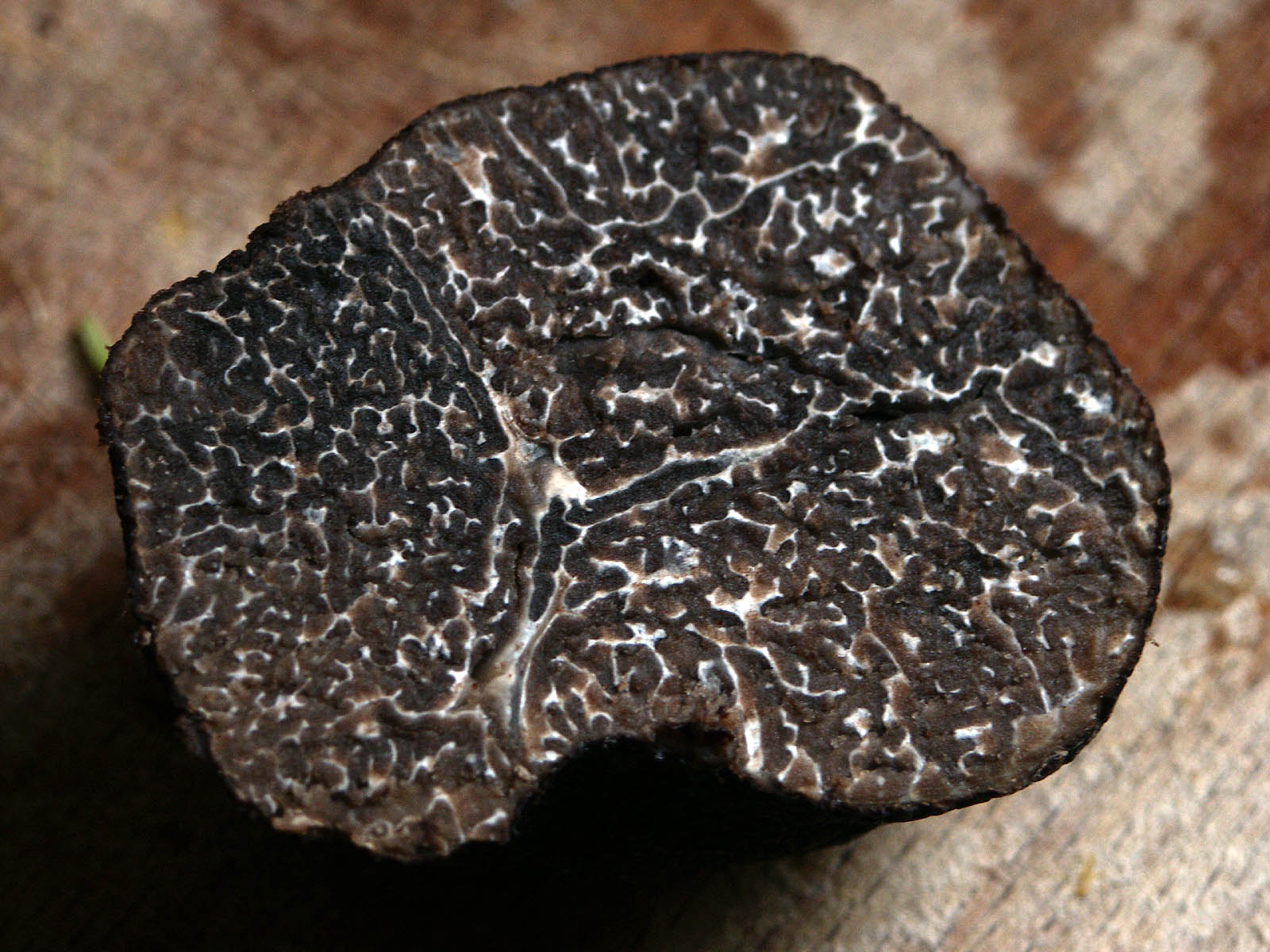
Black Périgord truffle, cross-section

The black truffle or black Périgord truffle (Tuber melanosporum), the second-most commercially valuable species, is named after the Périgord region in France. Black truffles associate with oaks, hazelnut, cherry, and other deciduous trees and are harvested in late autumn and winter. The genome sequence of the black truffle was published in March 2010.

==== Summer or burgundy ====
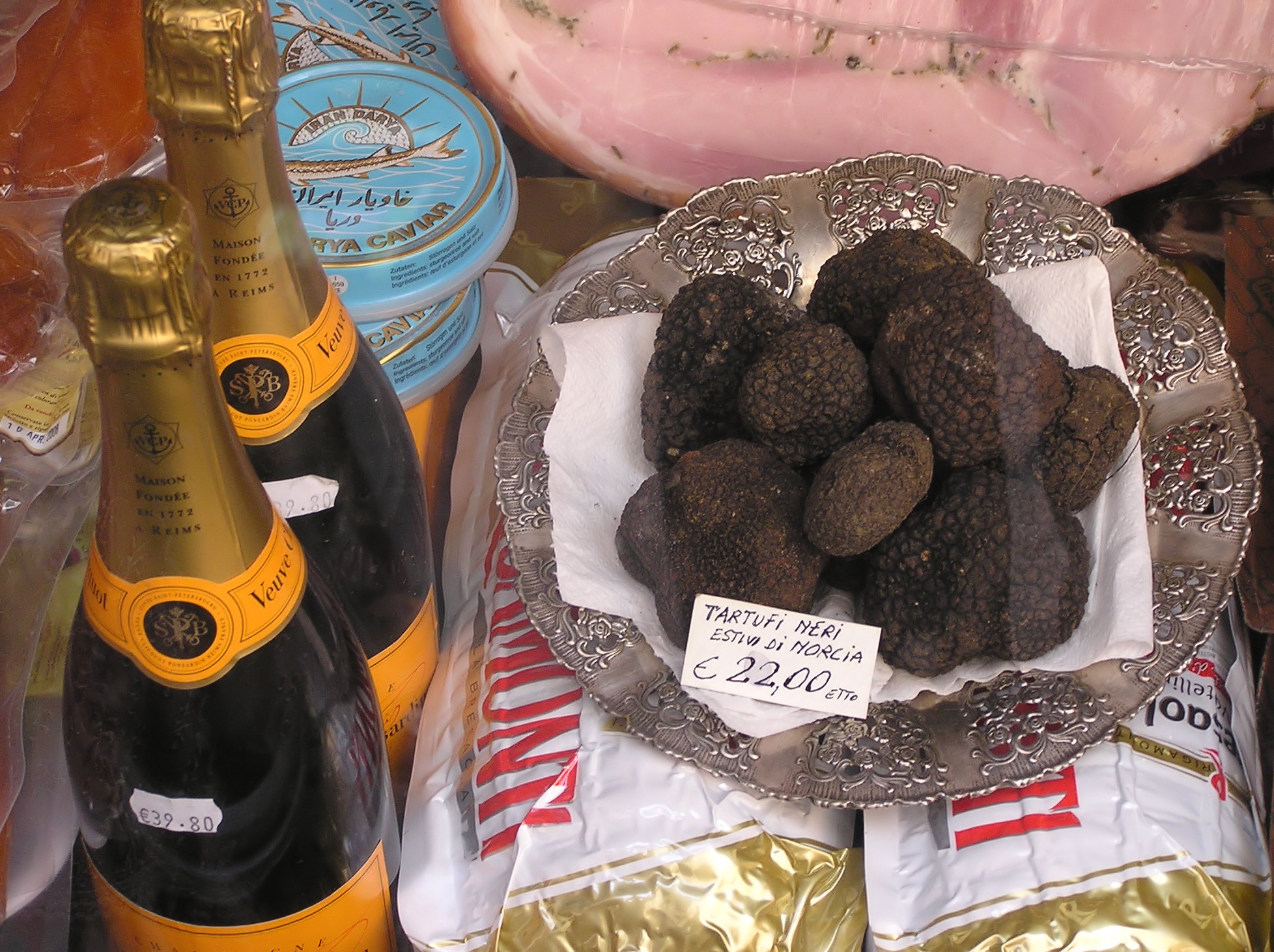
Summer truffles in a shop in Rome

The black summer truffle (Tuber aestivum) is found across Europe and is prized for its culinary value. Burgundy truffles (designated Tuber uncinatum, but the same species) are harvested in autumn until December and have aromatic flesh of a darker colour. These are associated with various trees and shrubs.

==== White ====
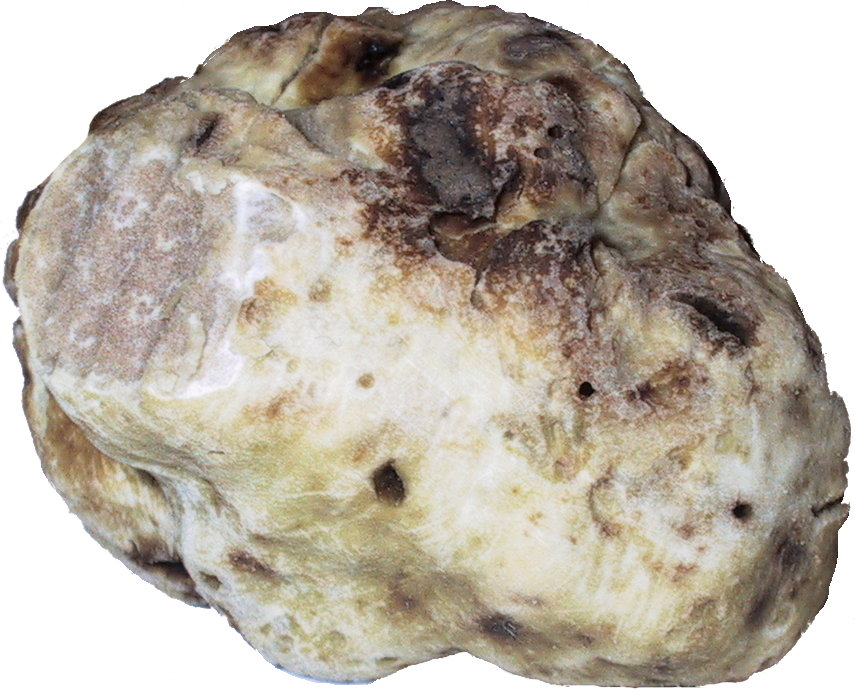
A white truffle washed and with a corner cut to show the interior

Tuber magnatum, the high-value white truffle (Italian: tartufo bianco) is found mainly in the Langhe and Montferrat areas of the Piedmont region in northern Italy, and most famously, in the countryside around the cities of Alba and Asti. A large percentage of Italy's white truffles also come from Molise.

Truffles are subterranean, highly prized fungi (Italian: diamonds of the earth) that grow on tree roots, often selling for thousands of dollars per pound due to their rarity and intense, savory umami flavour. They are found underground, usually with oak or hazelnut trees, and were historically hunted using pigs, though dogs are now preferred.

==== Whitish ====
The "whitish truffle" (Tuber borchii) is a similar species native to Tuscany, Abruzzo, Romagna, Umbria, the Marche, and Molise. It is reportedly not as aromatic as those from Piedmont, although those from Città di Castello are said to come quite close.

==== Other Tuber ====
A less common truffle is "garlic truffle" (Tuber macrosporum).

In the U.S. Pacific Northwest, several species of truffle are harvested both recreationally and commercially, most notably, Leucangium carthusianum, the Oregon black truffle; Tuber gibbosum, Oregon spring white truffle; and Tuber oregonense, Oregon winter white truffle. Kalapuya brunnea, the Oregon brown truffle, has also been commercially harvested and is of culinary note. The Oregon white truffle is increasingly harvested due to its high quality and also exported to other countries. Oregon celebrates its traditional truffle harvesting with a 'truffle festival', combined with culinary shows and wine tastings.

The pecan truffle (Tuber lyonii) syn. texense is found in the Southern United States, usually associated with pecan trees. Chefs who have experimented with them agree "they are very good and have potential as a food commodity". Although pecan farmers used to find them along with pecans and discard them, considering them a nuisance, they now sell for about $160 a pound and have been used in some gourmet restaurants.

===== Chinese =====
China is the world's largest exporter of truffles, both by mass and by money moved. Commerically important species include:

- Chinese black truffle, Tuber indicum (technically T. sinense), a sister species of T. melanosporum. Commonly used as a cheap substitude of melanosporum but also illicitly used in forgery.
- Chinese black summer truffle, Tuber sinoaestivum, sister species of T. aestivum. Used to be consiered the same as T. aestivum.
- Tuber pseudohimalayense also known as T. pseudoexcavatum, commercialized in Spain.

==== Beyond Tuber ====
The term "truffle" has been applied to several other genera of similar underground fungi. The genera Terfezia and Tirmania of the family Terfeziaceae are known as the "desert truffles" of Africa and the Middle East. Pisolithus tinctorius, which was historically eaten in parts of Germany, is sometimes called "Bohemian truffle".

Geopora spp. are important ectomycorrhizal partners of trees in woodlands and forests throughout the world. Pinus edulis, a widespread pine species of the Southwest US, is dependent on Geopora for nutrient and water acquisition in arid environments. Like other truffle fungi, Geopora produces subterranean sporocarps as a means of sexual reproduction. Geopora cooperi, also known as pine truffle or fuzzy truffle, is an edible species of this genus.

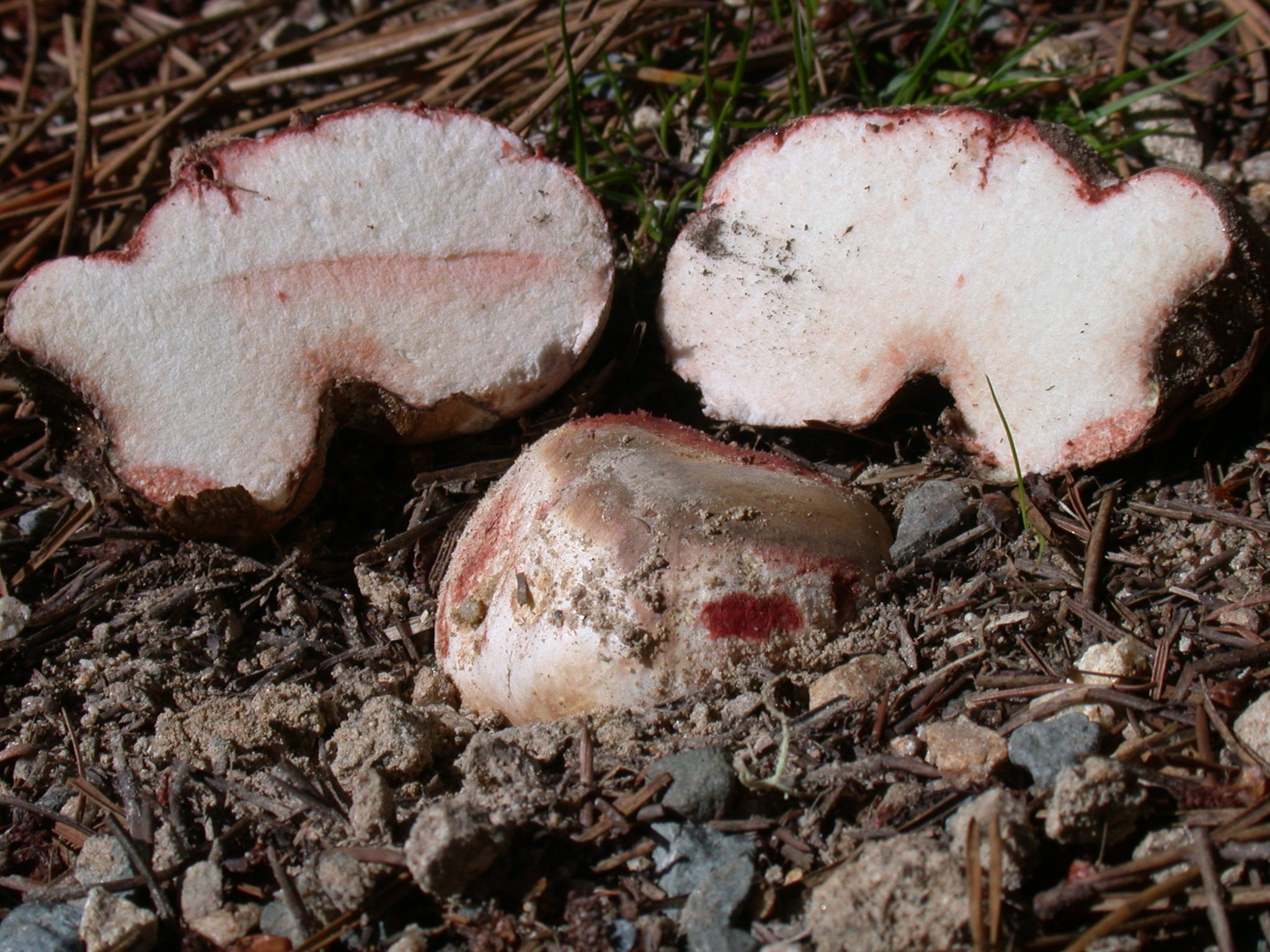
Rhizopogon truffle

Rhizopogon spp. are ectomycorrhizal members of the Basidiomycota and the order Boletales, a group of fungi that typically form mushrooms. Like their ascomycete counterparts, these fungi can create truffle-like fruiting bodies. Rhizopogon spp. are ecologically important in coniferous forests where they associate with various pines, firs, and Douglas fir. In addition to their ecological importance, these fungi hold economic value, as well. Rhizopogon spp. are commonly used to inoculate coniferous seedlings in nurseries and during reforestation.

Hysterangium spp. are ectomycorrhizal members of the Basidiomycota and the order Hysterangiales that form sporocarps similar to true truffles. These fungi form mycelial mats of vegetative hyphae that may cover 25–40% of the forest floor in Douglas fir forests, thereby contributing to a significant portion of the biomass present in soils. Like other ectomycorrhizal fungi, Hysterangium spp. play a role in nutrient exchange in the nitrogen cycle by accessing nitrogen unavailable to host plants and acting as nitrogen sinks in forests.

Glomus spp. are arbuscular mycorrhizae of the phylum Glomeromycota within the order Glomerales. Members of this genus have low host specificity, associating with a variety of plants including hardwoods, forbs, shrubs, and grasses. These fungi commonly occur throughout the Northern Hemisphere.

Members of the genus Elaphomyces are commonly mistaken for truffles.

=== Phylogeny ===
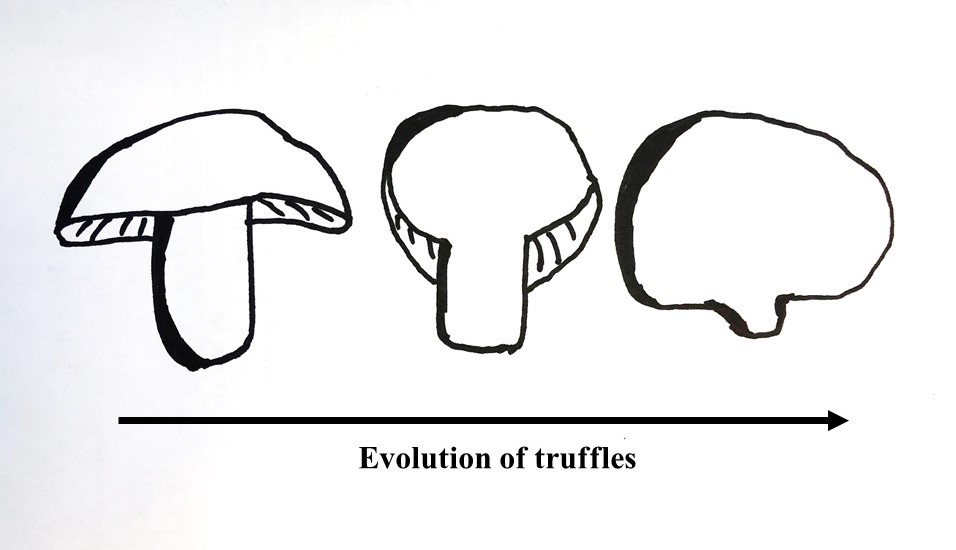
Evolution of subterranean fruiting bodies from above-ground mushrooms

Phylogenetic analysis has demonstrated the convergent evolution of the ectomycorrhizal trophic mode in diverse fungi. The subphylum Pezizomycotina, containing the order Pezizales, is approximately 400 million years old. Within the order Pezizales, subterranean fungi evolved independently at least fifteen times. Contained within Pezizales are the families Tuberaceae, Pezizaceae, Pyronematacae, and Morchellaceae. All of these families contain lineages of subterranean or truffle fungi.

The oldest ectomycorrhizal fossils are from the Eocene about 50 million years ago. The specimens are preserved permineralized in-situ in the Eocene Okanagan Highlands Princeton chert site. This indicates that the soft bodies of ectomycorrhizal fungi do not easily fossilize. Molecular clockwork has suggested the evolution of ectomycorrhizal fungi occurred approximately 130 million years ago.

The evolution of subterranean fruiting bodies has occurred numerous times within the Ascomycota, Basidiomycota, and Glomeromycota. For example, the genera Rhizopogon and Hysterangium of Basidiomycota both form subterranean fruiting bodies and play similar ecological roles as truffle forming ascomycetes. The ancestors of the Ascomycota genera Geopora, Tuber, and Leucangium originated in Laurasia during the Paleozoic era.

Phylogenetic evidence suggests that most subterranean fruiting bodies evolved from above-ground mushrooms. Over time mushroom stipes and caps were reduced, and caps began to enclose reproductive tissue. The dispersal of sexual spores then shifted from wind and rain to utilising animals.

The truffle habit has evolved independently among several basidiomycete genera. Phylogenetic analysis has revealed that basidiomycete subterranean fruiting bodies, like their ascomycete counterparts, evolved from above ground mushrooms. For example, Rhizopogon species likely arose from an ancestor shared with Suillus, a mushroom-forming genus. Studies have suggested that selection for subterranean fruiting bodies among ascomycetes and basidiomycetes occurred in water-limited environments.

=== Etymology ===
Most sources agree that the term "truffle" is derived from the Latin term tūber by way of the Vulgar Latin tufera, meaning "swelling" or "lump". This then entered other languages through Old French dialects.

== Ecology ==
The mycelia of truffles form symbiotic, mycorrhizal relationships with the roots of several tree species, including beech, birch, hazel, hornbeam, oak, pine, and poplar. Mutualistic ectomycorrhizal fungi such as truffles provide valuable nutrients to plants in exchange for carbohydrates. Ectomycorrhizal fungi cannot survive in the soil without their plant hosts. In fact, many of these fungi have lost the enzymes necessary for obtaining carbon through other means. For example, truffle fungi have lost their ability to degrade the cell walls of plants, limiting their capacity to decompose plant litter. Plant hosts can also depend on their associated truffle fungi. Geopora, Peziza, and Tuber spp. are vital in the establishment of oak communities.

Tuber species prefer argillaceous or calcareous soils that are well drained and neutral or alkaline. Tuber truffles fruit throughout the year, depending on the species, and can be found buried between the leaf litter and the soil. Most fungal biomass is found in the humus and litter layers of soil.

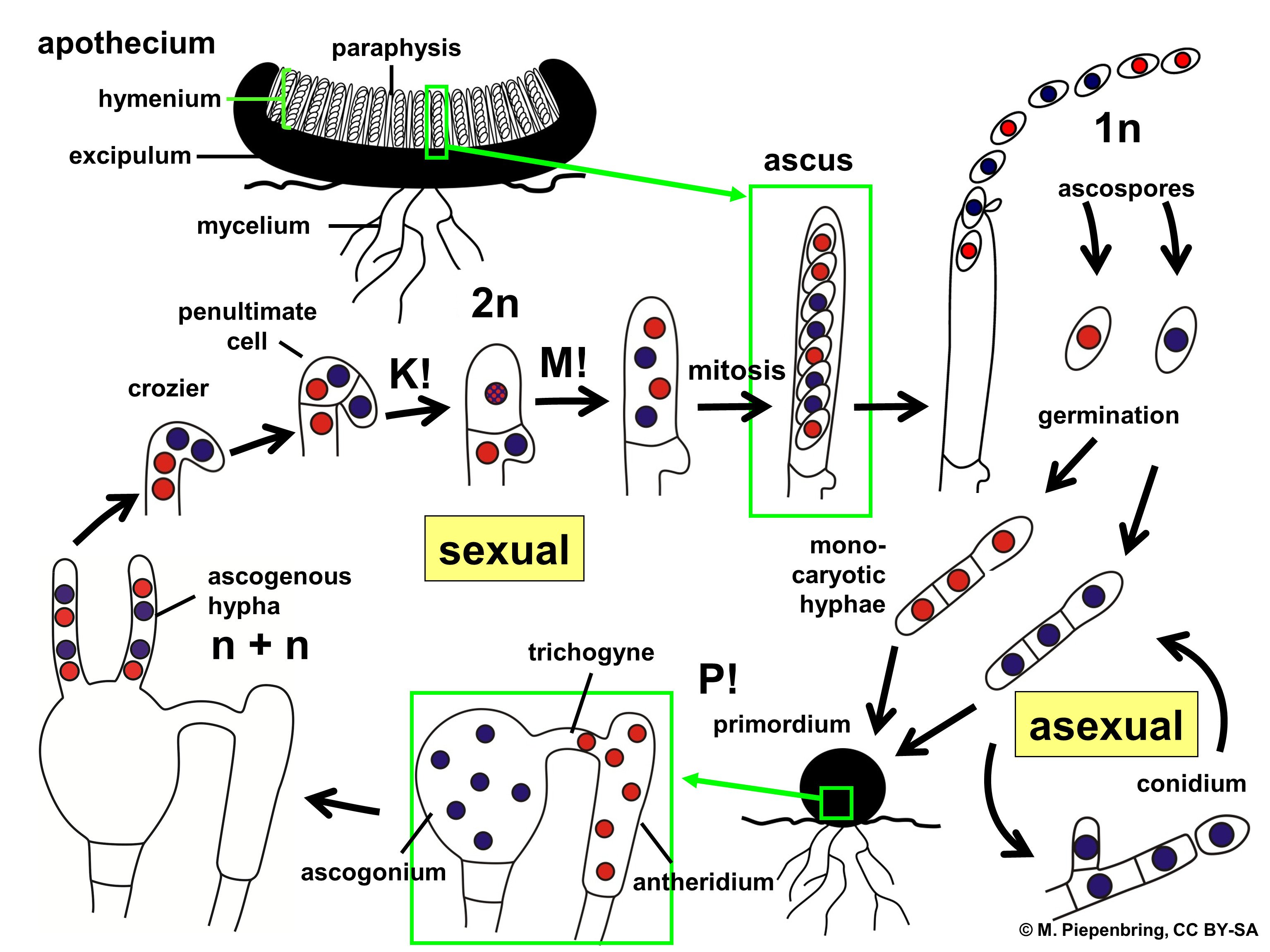
The lifecycle of the order Pezizales in Ascomycota

Most truffle fungi produce both asexual spores (mitospores or conidia) and sexual spores (meiospores or ascospores/basidiospores). Conidia can be produced more readily and with less energy than ascospores and can disperse during disturbance events. Production of ascospores is energy intensive because the fungus must allocate resources to the production of large sporocarps. Ascospores are borne within sac-like structures called asci, which are contained within the sporocarp.

Because truffle fungi produce their sexual fruiting bodies underground, spores cannot be spread by wind and water. Therefore, nearly all truffles depend on mycophagous animal vectors for spore dispersal. This is analogous to the dispersal of seeds in fruit of angiosperms. When the ascospores are fully developed, the truffle exudes volatile compounds that attract animal vectors. For successful dispersal, these spores must survive passage through the digestive tracts of animals. Ascospores have thick walls composed of chitin to help them endure the environment of animal guts.

Animal vectors include birds, deer, and rodents such as voles, squirrels, and chipmunks. Many species of trees, such as Quercus garryana, are dependent on the dispersal of sporocarps to inoculate isolated individuals. For example, the acorns of Q. garryana may be carried to new territory that lacks the necessary mycorrhizal fungi for establishment.

Some mycophagous animals depend on truffles as their dominant food source. Flying squirrels, Glaucomys sabrinus, of North America play a three-way symbiosis with truffles and their associated plants. G. sabrinus is particularly adapted to finding truffles using its refined sense of smell, visual clues, and long-term memory of prosperous populations of truffles. This intimacy between animals and truffles indirectly influences the success of mycorrhizal plant species.

After ascospores are dispersed, they remain dormant until germination is initiated by exudates excreted from host plant roots. Following germination, hyphae form and seek out the roots of host plants. Arriving at roots, hyphae begin to form a mantle or sheath on the outer surface of root tips. Hyphae then enter the root cortex intercellularly to form the Hartig net for nutrient exchange. Hyphae can spread to other root tips colonising the entire root system of the host. Over time, the truffle fungus accumulates sufficient resources to form fruiting bodies. Rate of growth is correlated with increasing photosynthetic rates in the spring as trees leaf out.

=== Nutrient exchange ===
Truffle fungi receive carbohydrates from their host plants, providing them with valuable micro- and macronutrients. Plant macronutrients include potassium, phosphorus, nitrogen, and sulfur. In contrast, micronutrients include iron, copper, zinc, and chloride. In truffle fungi, as in all ectomycorrhizae, the majority of nutrient exchange occurs in the Hartig net, the intercellular hyphal network between plant root cells. A unique feature of ectomycorrhizal fungi is the formation of the mantle on the outer surface of fine roots.

Truffles have been suggested to co-locate with the orchid species Epipactis helleborine and Cephalanthera damasonium, though this is not always the case.

=== Nutrient cycling ===
Truffle fungi are ecologically important in nutrient cycling. Plants obtain nutrients via their fine roots. Mycorrhizal fungi are much smaller than fine roots, so they have a higher surface area and a greater ability to explore soils for nutrients. Acquisition of nutrients includes the uptake of phosphorus, nitrate or ammonium, iron, magnesium, and other ions. Many ectomycorrhizal fungi form fungal mats in the upper layers of soils surrounding host plants. These mats have significantly higher carbon and fixed nitrogen concentrations than surrounding soils. Because these mats are nitrogen sinks, leaching of nutrients is reduced.

Mycelial mats can also help maintain the structure of soils by holding organic matter in place and preventing erosion. Often, these networks of mycelium provide support for smaller organisms in the soil, such as bacteria and microscopic arthropods. Bacteria feed on the exudates released by mycelium and colonise the soil surrounding them. Microscopic arthropods such as mites feed directly on mycelium and release valuable nutrients for the uptake of other organisms. Thus, truffle fungi and other ectomycorrhizal fungi facilitate a complex system of nutrient exchange between plants, animals, and microbes.

=== Importance in arid-land ecosystems ===
Plant community structure is often affected by the availability of compatible mycorrhizal fungi. In arid-land ecosystems, these fungi become essential for the survival of their host plants by enhancing the ability to withstand drought. A foundation species in arid-land ecosystems of the Southwest U.S. is Pinus edulis, commonly known as pinyon pine. P. edulis associates with the subterranean fungi Geopora and Rhizopogon.

As global temperatures rise, so does the occurrence of severe droughts, detrimentally affecting the survival of aridland plants. This variability in climate has increased the mortality of P. edulis. Therefore, the availability of compatible mycorrhizal inoculum can greatly affect the successful establishment of P. edulis seedlings. Associated ectomycorrhizal fungi will likely play a significant role in the survival of P. edulis with continuing global climate change.

=== Volatile constituents ===
External videos
- "The Chemistry of Truffles, the Most Expensive Food in the World", Sarah Everts, CEN Online

The mycelia or fruiting bodies release the volatile constituents responsible for the natural aroma of truffles or derive from truffle-associated microbes. The chemical ecology of truffle volatiles is complex, interacting with plants, insects, and mammals, which contribute to spore dispersal. Depending on the truffle species, lifecycle, or location, they include:

- Sulfur volatiles, which occur in all truffle species, such as dimethyl mono- (DMS), di- (DMDS) and tri- (DMTS) sulfides, as well as 2-methyl-4,5-dihydrothiophene, characteristic of the white truffle T. borchii and 2,4-dithiapentane occurring in all species but mostly characteristic of the white truffle T. magnatum. Some very aromatic white truffles are notably pungent, even irritating the eye when cut or sliced.
- Metabolites of nonsulfur amino acid constituents (simple and branched-chain hydrocarbons) such as ethylene (produced by mycelia of white truffles affecting root architecture of host tree), as well as 2-methylbutanal, 2-methylpropanal, and 2-phenylethanol (also common in baker's yeast).
- Fatty acid-derived volatiles (C8-alcohols and aldehydes with a characteristic fungal odor, such as 1-octen-3-ol and 2-octenal). The former is derived from linoleic acid and produced by mature white truffle T. borchii.
- Thiophene derivatives appear to be produced by bacterial symbionts living in the truffle body. The most abundant of these, 3-methyl-4-5 dihydrothiophene, contributes to the white truffle's aroma.

Several truffle species and varieties are differentiated based on their relative contents or absence of sulfides, ethers or alcohols, respectively. The sweaty-musky aroma of truffles is similar to that of the pheromone androstenol that also occurs in humans. As of 2010, the volatile profiles of seven black and six white truffle species have been studied.

== Extraction ==
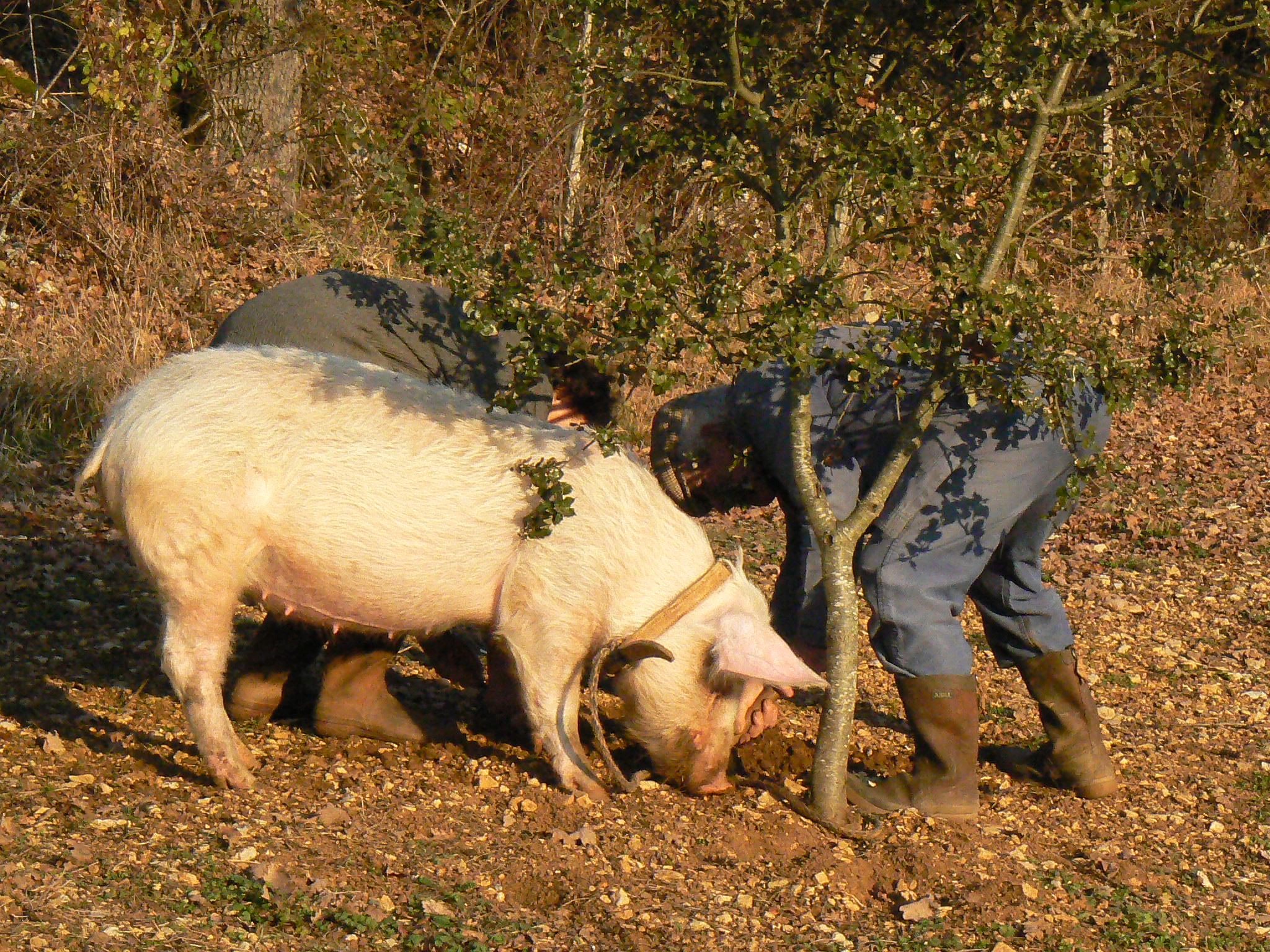
A trained truffle hunting pig in Gignac, Lot, France

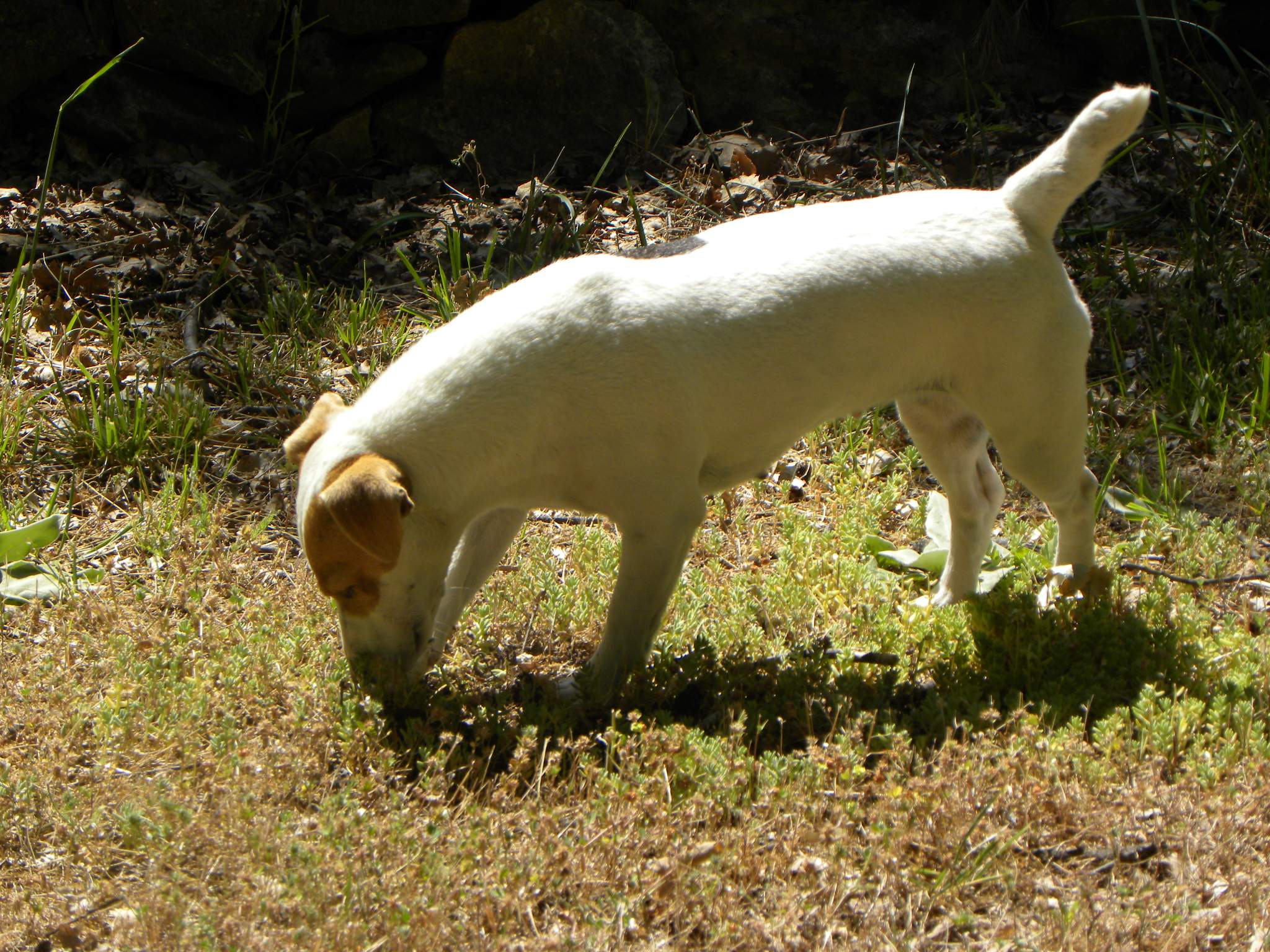
A trained truffle hunting dog in Mons, Var, France

Comparison of truffle dog and pig
Truffle dog	Truffle pig
Keen sense of smell	Keen sense of smell
Must be trained	Innate ability to sniff out truffles
Easier to control	Tendency to eat truffles once found

Because truffles are subterranean, they are often located with the help of an animal (sometimes called a truffler) possessing a refined sense of smell. Traditionally, pigs have been used to extract truffles. Both the female pig's natural truffle-seeking and her intent to eat the truffle were thought to be due to a compound within the truffle similar to androstenol, the sex pheromone of boar saliva, to which the sow is keenly attracted. Studies in 1990 demonstrated that the compound actively recognised by both truffle pigs and dogs is dimethyl sulfide.

In Italy, the use of pigs to hunt truffles has been prohibited since 1985 because of damage caused by animals to truffle mycelia during the digging that dropped the production rate of the area for some years. An alternative to truffle pigs are dogs. Dogs offer an advantage because they do not have a strong desire to eat truffles, so they can be trained to locate sporocarps without digging them up. Pigs attempt to dig up truffles.

Fly species of the genus Suillia can also detect the volatile compounds associated with subterranean fruiting bodies. These flies lay their eggs above truffles to provide food for their young. At ground level, Suilla flies can be seen flying above truffles.

== Cultivation ==
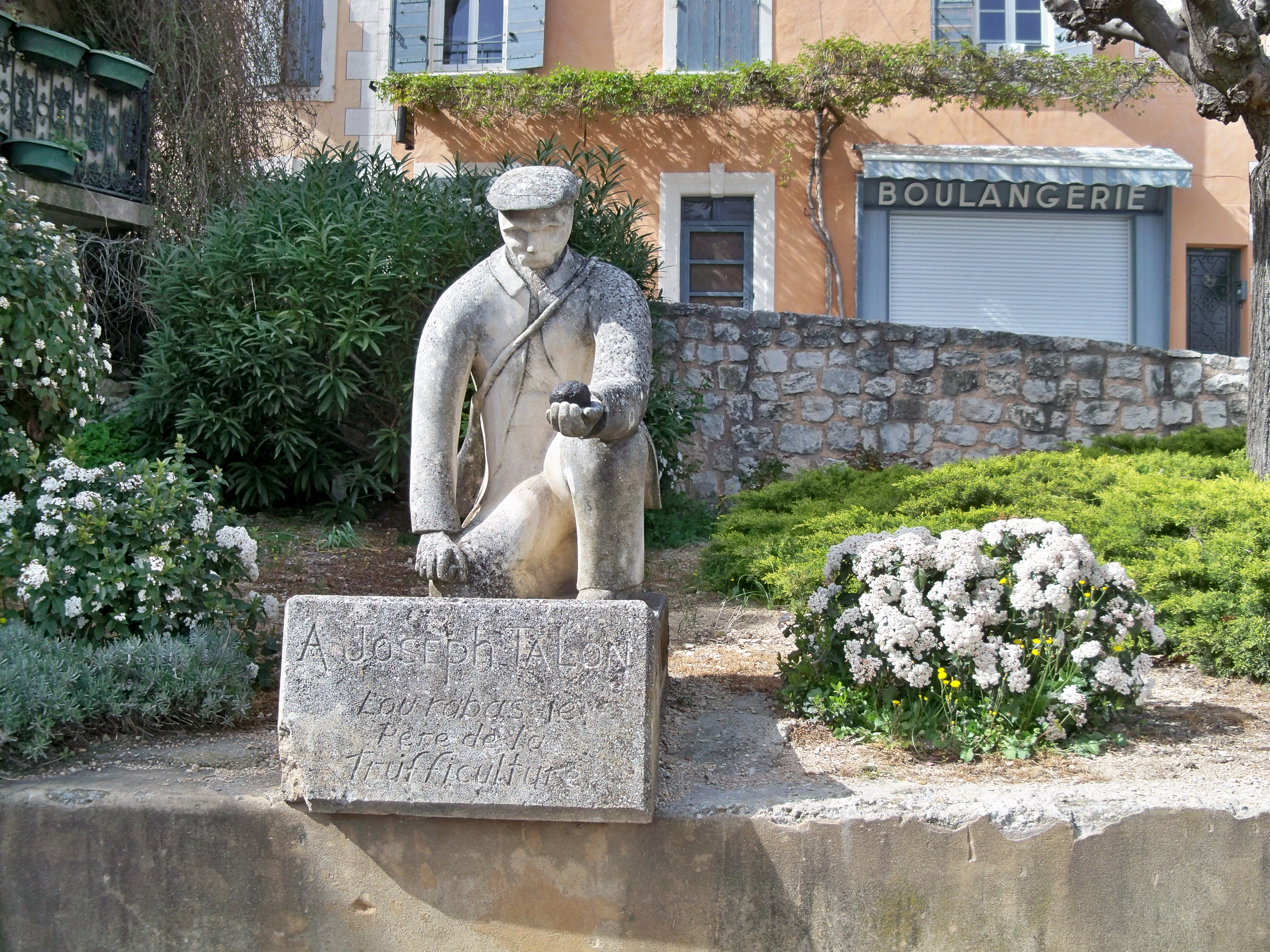
Statue of Joseph Talon in Saint-Saturnin-lès-Apt

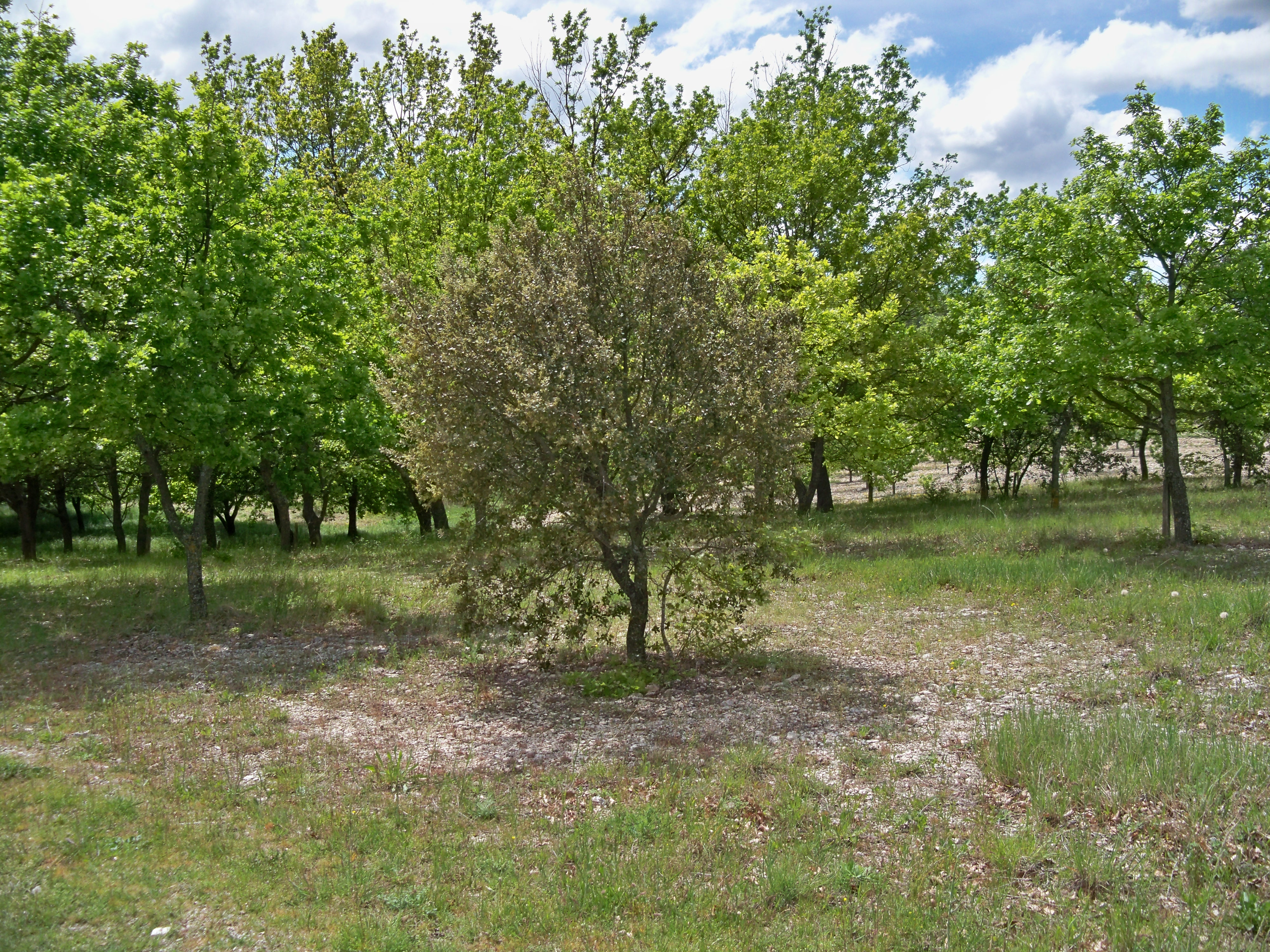
Planted truffle groves near Beaumont-du-Ventoux

Truffles long eluded techniques of cultivation, as Jean-Anthelme Brillat-Savarin (1825) noted:

The most learned men have sought to ascertain the secret and fancied they discovered the seed. Their promises, however, were vain, and no planting was ever followed by a harvest. This perhaps is all right, for as one of the great values of truffles is their dearness, perhaps they would be less highly esteemed if they were cheaper.

Truffles can be cultivated. As early as 1808, attempts to cultivate truffles, known in French as trufficulture, were successful. People had long observed that truffles were growing among the roots of certain trees, and in 1808, Joseph Talon, from Apt (département of Vaucluse) in southern France, had the idea of transplanting some seedlings that he had collected at the foot of oak trees known to host truffles in their root system.

For discovering how to cultivate truffles, some sources now give priority to Pierre II Mauléon (1744–1831) of Loudun (in western France), who began to cultivate truffles around 1790. Mauléon saw an "obvious symbiosis" between the oak tree, the rocky soil, and the truffle and attempted to reproduce such an environment by taking acorns from trees known to have produced truffles and sowing them in chalky soil. His experiment was successful, with truffles found in the soil around the newly grown oak trees years later. In 1847, Auguste Rousseau of Carpentras (in Vaucluse) planted 7 hectares (17 acres) of oak trees (again from acorns found on the soil around truffle-producing oak trees), and he subsequently obtained large harvests of truffles. He received a prize at the 1855 World's Fair in Paris.

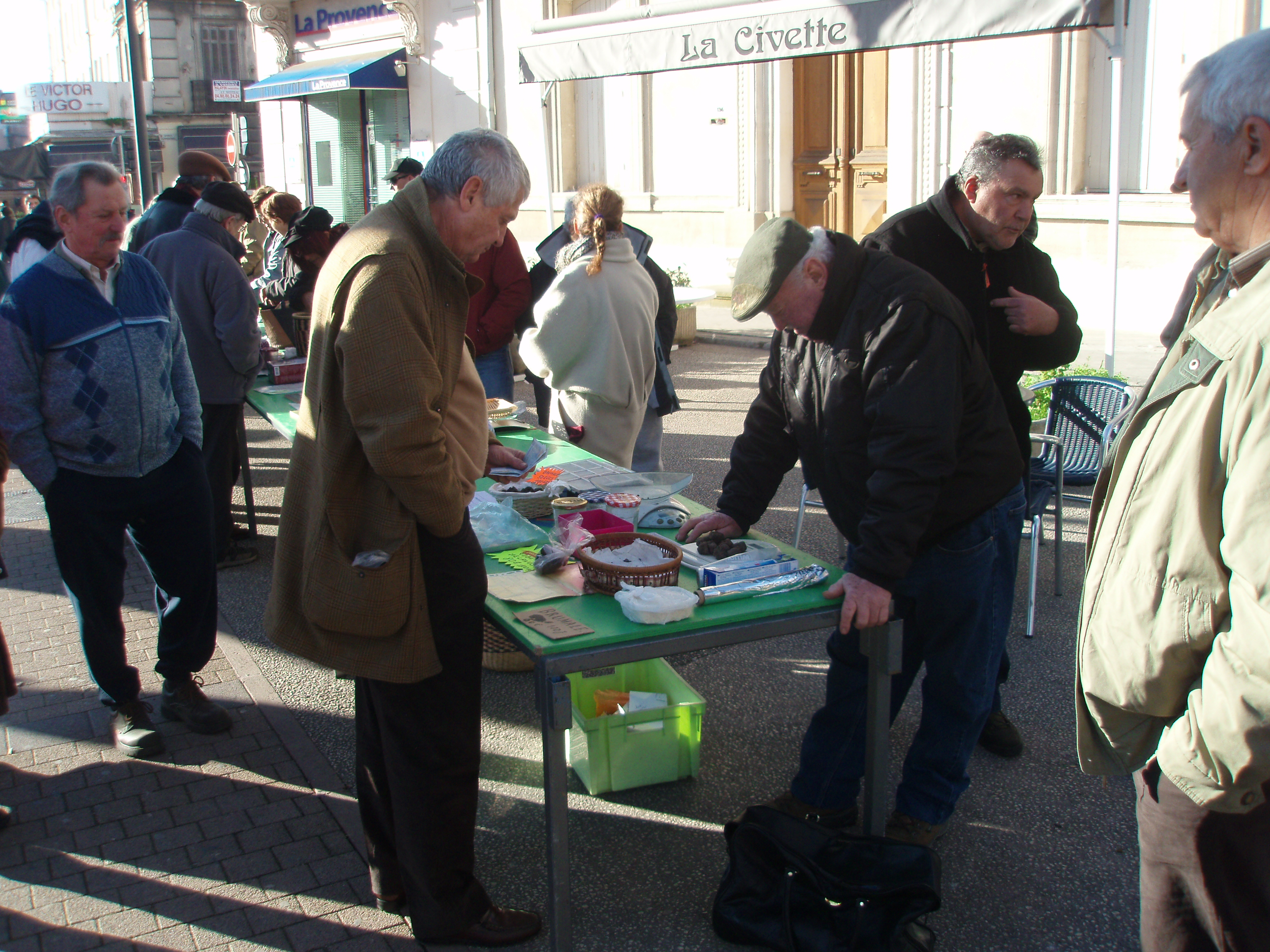
A truffle market in Carpentras, France

Others imitated these successful attempts in France and Italy. In the late 19th century, an epidemic of phylloxera destroyed many of the vineyards in southern France. Another epidemic killed most of the silkworms there, too, making the fields of mulberry trees useless. Trufficulture became an important source of income for those affected. The calcareous and exposed vineyard soils were well-suited to the cultivation of truffles. By 1890, truffières (truffle plantations) covered 750 km^{2} of land in France, and 2,000 tonnes of truffles were produced in that year.

From the 19th century to the present, truffle production fell by 97–99% to 20–50 tonnes annually. Reasons given for this decline include the Industrial Revolution, the subsequent rural flight and the multiple European wars of the 20th century, which reduced the rural population. For example, World War I resulted in the mobilisation of 65% of the agricultural workers from the region of Lot alone. Knowledge of truffle cultivation, the soil and the seasons was lost along with the people. Another consequence was no more grazing sheep or shepherds who pruned trees for feed and fuelwood, so former truffle plantations turned into closed forests that no longer produced truffles. Truffles were once sold at weekly markets (bi-weekly in the case of a market in Martel, Lot) and in quantities of two to six tonnes in good weeks, but only Lalbenque and Limogne today have weekly truffle markets. Prices have increased so that truffles, once seen as a food of the middle class, have become a luxury.

The situation changed in the late 1960s and early 1970s, with researchers in France and Italy establishing mycorrhizas with truffle spores. Beginning from the 1980s, truffle plantations are compensating for some of the decline in wild truffles, and exist in various countries including France, Italy, Spain and Australia. About 80% of the truffles now produced in France come from specially planted truffle groves. Investments in cultivated plantations are underway in many parts of the world using controlled irrigation for regular and resilient production.

A critical phase of the cultivation is the quality control of the mycorrhizal plants. Between 7 and 10 years are needed for the truffles to develop their mycorrhizal network, and only after that do the host plants come into production. Complete soil analysis to avoid contamination by other dominant fungi and very strict control of the formation of mycorrhizae are necessary to ensure the success of a plantation. Total investment per hectare for an irrigated and barrier-sealed plantation (against wild boars) can cost up to €10,000. Considering the level of initial investment and the maturity delay, farmers who have not taken care of both soil conditions and seedling conditions are at high risk of failure.

=== New Zealand and Australia ===
The first black truffles (Tuber melanosporum) to be produced in the Southern Hemisphere were harvested in Gisborne, New Zealand in 1993.

New Zealand's first burgundy truffle was found in July 2012 at a Waipara truffle farm. It weighed 330 g and was found by the farm owner's beagle.

In 1999, the first Australian truffles were harvested in Tasmania, the result of eight years of work. Trees were inoculated with the truffle fungus to create a local truffle industry. Their success and the value of the resulting truffles has encouraged a small industry to develop.

Truffle production has expanded into the colder regions of Victoria, New South Wales and Western Australia. In 2014, over 5,000 kilograms (11,000 pounds) of truffles were harvested by Truffle Hill, Manjimup, Western Australia.

In June 2014, a grower harvested Australia's largest truffle from their property at Robertson, in the Southern Highlands of New South Wales. It was a French black périgord fungus weighing in at 1.172 kg (2 lb 9 5/16 oz) and was valued at over $2,000 per kilogram.

=== United States ===
Périgord truffles were first farmed in Tennessee in 2007. At its peak in the 2008–2009 season, one farm produced about 200 pounds of truffles, but Eastern filbert blight almost entirely wiped out the hazel trees by 2013 and production dropped, essentially ending the business. Eastern filbert blight similarly destroyed the orchards of other once-promising commercial farms in East Tennessee, while newer farms in California, North Carolina, Oregon, and Arkansas were started. As of 2022, the Appalachian truffle (Tuber canaliculatum) was being developed as a potential market.

== Uses ==
Shaved Périgord truffle with pasta at Spago in Las Vegas, Nevada

Because of their high price and their strong aroma, truffles are used sparingly. Supplies can be found commercially as unadulterated fresh produce or preserved, typically in a light brine.

Their chemical compounds infuse well with fats such as butter, cream, cheeses, avocados, and coconut cream.

As the volatile aromas dissipate more quickly when heated, truffles are generally served raw and shaved over warm, simple foods which highlight their flavour, such as buttered pasta or eggs. Thin truffle slices may be inserted into meats, under the skins of roasted fowl, in foie gras preparations, in pâtés, or in stuffings. Some speciality cheeses contain truffles, as well. Truffles are also used for producing truffle salt and truffle honey.

While chefs once peeled truffles, in modern times, most restaurants brush the truffle carefully and shave it or dice it with the skin on to make the most of the valuable ingredient. Some restaurants stamp out circular discs of truffle flesh and use the skins for sauces.

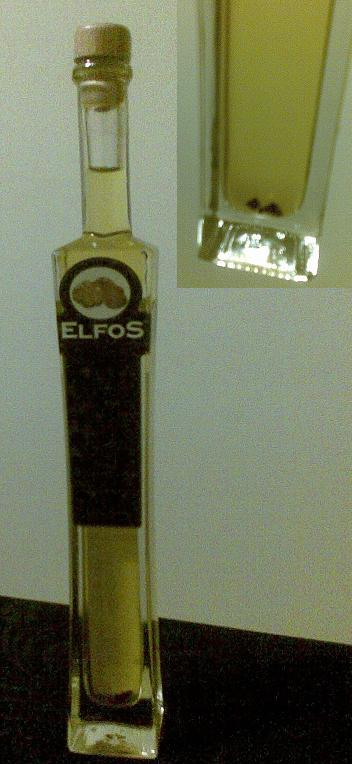
Truffle oil (olive oil with Tuber melanosporum)

=== Oil ===
Truffle oil is used as a lower-cost and convenient substitute for truffles, to provide flavouring, or to enhance the flavour and aroma of truffles in cooking. Some products called "truffle oils" contain no truffles or include pieces of inexpensive, unprized truffle varietals, which have no culinary value, simply for show. The vast majority is oil that has been artificially flavoured using a synthetic agent such as 2,4-dithiapentane.

The scientific name is included on the ingredient list of truffle oils infused with natural truffles.

=== Vodka ===
Because more aromatic molecules in truffles are soluble in alcohol, they can carry a more complex and accurate truffle flavour than oil without synthetic flavourings. Many commercial producers use 2,4-dithiapentane regardless, as it has become the dominant flavour most consumers, unexposed to fresh truffles but familiar with oils, associate with them. Because most Western nations do not have ingredient labelling requirements for spirits, consumers often do not know if artificial flavourings have been used. It is used as a spirit in its own right, a cocktail mix or a food flavouring.

== Cultural history ==
=== Antiquity ===
The first mention of truffles appears in the inscriptions of the neo-Sumerians regarding their Amorite enemy's eating habits (Third Dynasty of Ur, 2nd century BCE) and later in writings of Theophrastus in the 4th century BCE. In classical times, their origins were a mystery that challenged many; Plutarch and others thought them to be the result of lightning, warmth, and water in the soil, while Juvenal thought thunder and rain to be instrumental in their origin. Cicero deemed them children of the earth, while Dioscorides thought they were tuberous roots.

Rome and Thracia in the Classical period identified three kinds of truffles: Tuber melanosporum, T. magnificus, and T. magnatum. The Romans instead used a variety of fungus called terfez, also sometimes called a "desert truffle". Terfez used in Rome came from Lesbos, Carthage, and especially Libya, where the coastal climate was less dry in ancient times. Their substance is pale, tinged with rose. Unlike truffles, terfez have little inherent flavour. The Romans used the terfez as a flavour carrier because the terfez tends to absorb surrounding flavours. Because Ancient Roman cuisine used many spices and flavourings, the terfez may have been appropriate in that context.

=== Middle Ages ===
Truffles were rarely used during the Middle Ages. Truffle hunting is mentioned by Bartolomeo Platina, the papal historian, in 1481, when he recorded that the sows of Notza were without equal in hunting truffles, but they should be muzzled to prevent them from eating the prize.

=== Renaissance and modernity ===
During the Renaissance, truffles regained popularity in Europe and were honoured at the court of King Francis I of France. They were popular in Parisian markets in the 1780s, imported seasonally from truffle grounds, where peasants had long enjoyed them. Brillat-Savarin (1825) noted that they were so expensive they appeared only at the dinner tables of great nobles and kept women. They were sometimes served with turkey, including in the dish truffled turkey.

== See also ==
- Chocolate truffle – a confection named for its similar appearance to a truffle
- List of Tuber species
- Specialty foods

== Additional resources ==
- Morcillo, M.; Sanchez, M.; Vilanova, X. (2015). Truffle Farming Today, a Comprehensive World Guide. Micología Forestal & Aplicada. ISBN 978-84-617-1307-3.
- Trappe, Matt; Evans, Frank; Trappe, James M. (2007). Field Guide to North American Truffles: Hunting, Identifying, and Enjoying the World's Most Prized Fungi. Natural History Series. Ten Speed Press. ISBN 978-1-58008-862-6.
- Nowak, Zachary (2015). Truffle: A Global History. The Edible Series. Reaktion. ISBN 978-1-78023-436-6.
- "Why Real Truffles Are So Expensive". Business Insider. 2019-10-26. Archived from the original on 2021-12-12.
