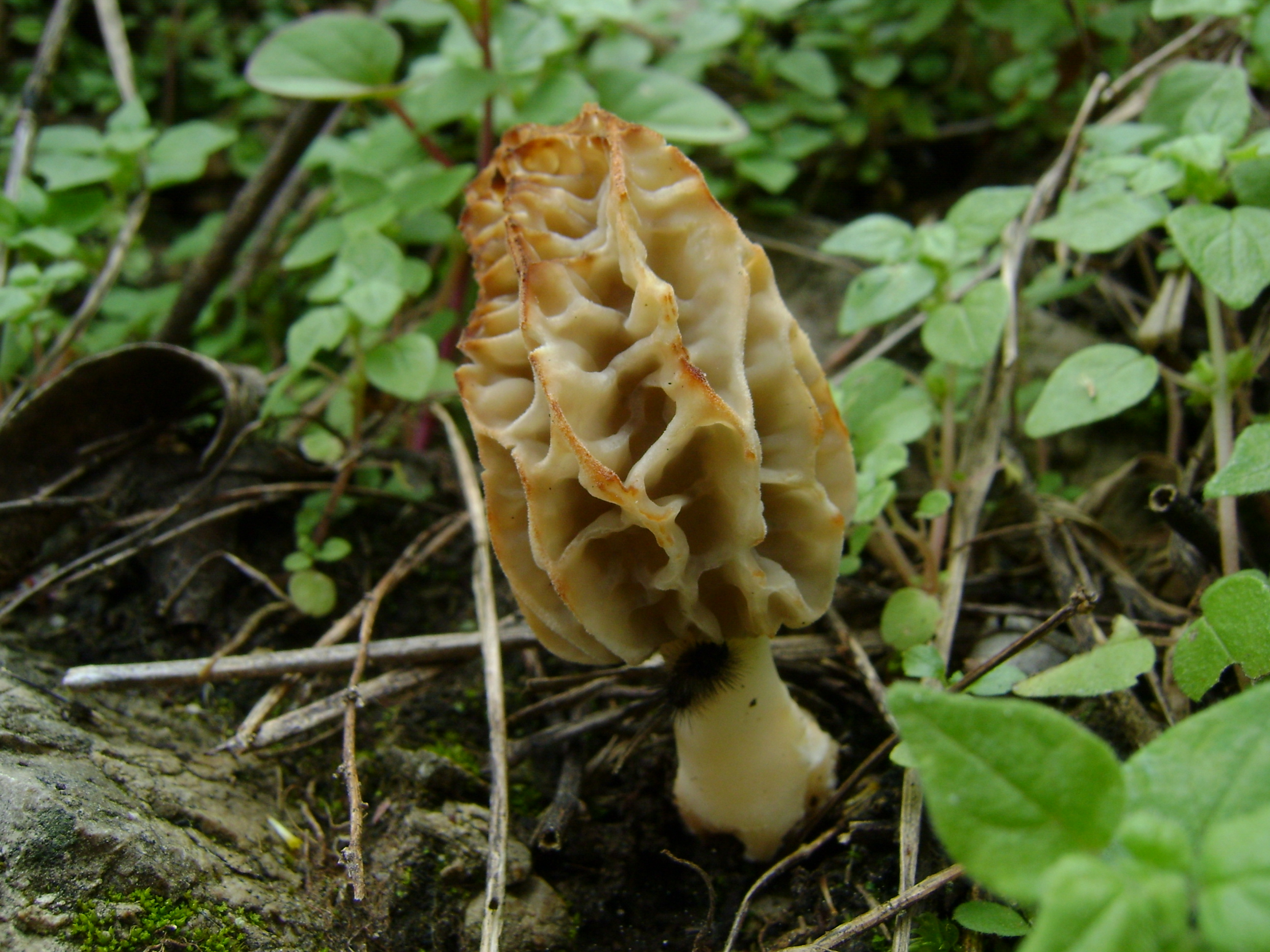

Scientific classification
- Domain: Eukaryota
- Kingdom: Fungi
- Division: Ascomycota
- Class: Pezizomycetes
- Order: Pezizales
- Family: Morchellaceae
- Genus: Morchella
- Species: M. rufobrunnea

Binomial name
- Morchella rufobrunnea Guzmán & F.Tapia (1998)

= Morchella rufobrunnea =

Species of edible fungus in the family Morchellaceae

Morchella rufobrunnea Mycological characteristics
- Smooth hymenium
- Cap is conical or ovate
- Stipe is bare
- Spore print is cream to yellow
- Ecology is saprotrophic
- Edibility is choice

Morchella rufobrunnea, commonly known as the blushing morel, is a species of ascomycete fungus in the family Morchellaceae. A choice edible species, the fungus was described as new to science in 1998 by mycologists Gastón Guzmán and Fidel Tapia from collections made in Veracruz, Mexico. Its distribution was later revealed to be far more widespread after several DNA studies suggested that it is also present in the West Coast of the United States, Israel, Australia, Cyprus, Malta and Switzerland.

M. rufobrunnea grows in disturbed soil or in woodchips used in landscaping as a saprotroph. Reports from the Mediterranean under olive trees (Olea europaea), however, suggest the fungus may also be able to form facultative tree associations. Young fruit bodies have conical caps with pale ridges and dark grayish pits; mature specimens are yellowish to ochraceous-buff. The surface of the fruit body often bruises brownish orange to pinkish where it has been touched or injured, a characteristic for which the fungus is named, the New Latin rufobrunnea signifying "rufus brown". Mature fruit bodies can grow to a height of 9.0–15.5 cm (3.5–6.1 in). M. rufobrunnea differs from other Morchella species by its urban or suburban habitat preferences, in the color and form of the fruit body, the lack of a sinus at the attachment of the cap with the stipe, the length of the pits on the surface, and the bruising reaction. A process to cultivate morels now known to be M. rufobrunnea was described and patented in the 1980s.

== Taxonomy and phylogeny ==
The first scientifically described specimens of Morchella rufobrunnea were collected in June 1996 from the Ecological Institute of Xalapa and other regions in the southern Mexican municipality of Xalapa, Veracruz, which are characterized by a subtropical climate. The type locality is a mesophytic forest containing oak, sweetgum, Clethra and alder at an altitude of 1,350 m (4,430 ft). In a 2008 study, Michael Kuo determined that the "winter fruiting yellow morel"—erroneously referred to as Morchella deliciosa—found in landscaping sites in the western United States was the same species as M. rufobrunnea. According to Kuo, David Arora depicts this species in his popular 1986 work Mushrooms Demystified, describing it as a "coastal Californian form of Morchella deliciosa growing in gardens and other suburban habitats". Kuo suggests that M. rufobrunnea is the correct name for the M. deliciosa used by western American authors. Other North American morels formerly classified as deliciosa have since been recategorized into two distinct species, Morchella diminutiva and M. virginiana (=M. sceptriformis).

Molecular analysis of nucleic acid sequences from the internal transcribed spacer (ITS), the elongation factor EF-1α, and the RNA polymerase II (rpb1, rpb2) regions, suggests that the genus Morchella is naturally divided into three lineages. Morchella rufobrunnea and its sister-species M. anatolica, both belong to an early diverging lineage that is basal to the /Esculenta clade ("yellow morels") and the /Elata clade ("black morels"). Ancestral area reconstruction tests indicate that the genus has existed in its current form since the late Jurassic (roughly 154 million years ago), when it is estimated to have evolved from a common ancestor. Although the genus was originally assumed to have emerged in western North America, updated ancestral reconstructions inferred from an enlarged 79-taxon database, suggest that the /Rufobrunnea lineage, and thus genus Morchella, originated in the Mediterranean region.

The specific epithet rufobrunnea derives from the Latin roots ruf- (rufuous, reddish) and brunne- (brown). Vernacular names used for the fungus include "western white morel", "blushing morel", and—accounting for the existence of subtropical species in the "blushing clade"—"red-brown blushing morel".

== Description ==
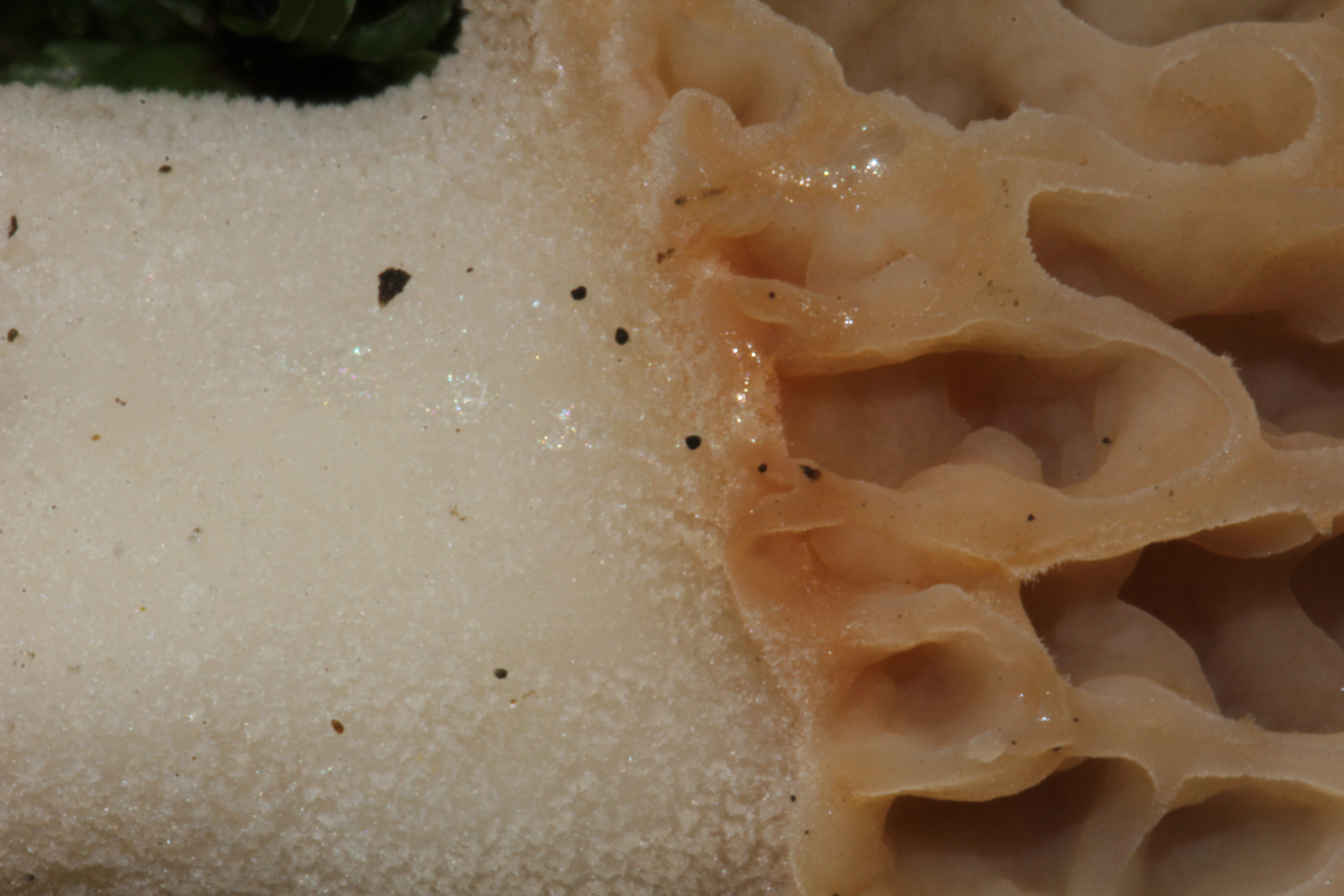
Tiny dark granules are on the apex of the stipe.

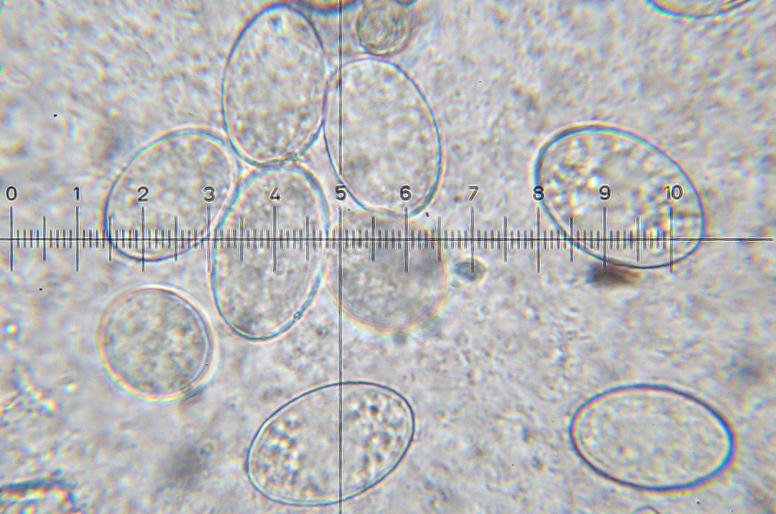
The translucent, egg-shaped spores are up to 24 μm long.

Fruit bodies of M. rufobrunnea can reach 6–21 cm (2.4–8.3 in) tall, although most are typically found in a narrower range, 9–15.5 cm (3.5–6 in). The conical to roughly cylindrical hymenophore (cap) is typically 6–12 cm (2.4–4.7 in) high by 2–6 cm (0.79–2.36 in) wide. Its surface is covered with longitudinal anastomosed ridges and crosswise veins that form broad, angular, elongated pits. Young fruit bodies are typically dark grey with sharply contrasting beige or buff ridges, while mature specimens fade to ochraceous-buff. The cylindrical stipe is often strongly wrinkled, enlarged at the base and measures 30–70 cm (12–28 in) by 1–2.5 cm (0.4–1.0 in) thick. It is typically covered with a dark brown to greyish pruinescence, often fading at maturity, a useful character to discriminate it from similar species, such as M. tridentina (=Morchella frustrata), or M. sceptriformis. The stipe and hymenophore often exhibit ochraceous, orange or reddish stains, although this feature is neither constant nor exclusive to M. rufobrunnea and can be seen in a number of Morchella species, such as M. anatolica, M. esculenta, M. fluvialis, M. guatemalensis, M. palazonii, and M. tridentina.

In deposit, the spores are pale orange to yellowish orange. Ascospores are egg-shaped, measuring 20–24 by 14–16 μm when mature, but smaller (14.5–19 by 9–10 μm) in immature fruit bodies. They are thin-walled, hyaline (translucent), and inamyloid. Although in normal light microscopy they appear smooth, they are longitudinally grooved when viewed in the appropriate staining medium (like heated lactophenol cotton blue) or under a scanning electron microscope. The cylindrical asci (spore-bearing cells) are 300–360 by 16–20 μm with walls up to 1.5 μm thick. Paraphyses measure 90–184 by 10–18.5 μm (6–9 μm thick if immature); they are hyaline, have 1–2 (–3) septa in the lower half and slightly enlarged, subcapitate tips. The flesh is made of thin-walled, hyaline hyphae measuring 3–9 μm wide. The stipe is a textura globosa, with scattered or locally fasciculate, polymorphic terminal elements measuring 15–70 × 12–16 μm.

Morchella rubobrunnea is an edible fungus; it has been described variously as "one of the tastiest members of the morel family", and alternately as "bland in comparison to other morel species". Individual specimens over 1 pound (0.45 kg) have been reported.

=== Similar species ===
Morchella anatolica is the sister-species of M. rufobrunnea and rather similar in appearance, but produces smaller and slender fruit bodies with very few or no transverse interconnecting ridges. Microscopically, both species have longitudinally grooved ascospores when viewed under a scanning electron microscope or in the appropriate staining medium, but the spores of M. anatolica are generally larger on average, measuring (22.5–)24–27(–32) by (12–)13–17(–20) μm. M. anatolica also has larger and differently shaped terminal hyphae ("hairs") on the stipe, frequently exceeding 100–200 μm.

Morchella tridentina (=Morchella frustrata) is also rufescent and very similar to M. rufobrunnea. It is found in mountainous forests and maquis and forms a marked sinus at the attachment of the cap with the stem, which is pure white. At maturity, it develops more or less parallel, ladderlike interconnecting ridges. Microscopically, it often has moniliform paraphyses with septa extending in the upper half and has more regularly cylindrical or clavate 'hairs' on the stem, up to 100 μm long. M. guatemalensis, found in Central America, has a color ranging from yellow to yellowish-orange, but never grey, and it has a more distinct reddish to wine red bruising reaction. Microscopically, it has smaller paraphyses, measuring 56–103 by 6.5–13 μm. The New Guinean species M. rigidoides has smaller fruit bodies that are pale ochre to yellow, without any grey. Its pits are less elongated than those of M. rufobrunnea, and it has wider paraphyses, up to 30 μm.

Morchella americana (=M. esculentoides), is widely distributed in North America, north of Mexico and has similar colours to mature fruit bodies of M. rufobrunnea, but lacks the bruising reaction. M. diminutiva, found in hardwood forests of eastern North America, has a smaller fruit body than M. rufobrunnea, up to 9.4 cm (3.7 in) tall and up to 2.7 cm (1.1 in) wide at its widest point. M. sceptriformis (=M. virginiana) is found in riparian and upland ecosystems from Virginia to northern Mississippi, usually in association with the American tulip tree (Liriodendron tulipifera). M. elata and M. semilibera are also similar.

== Habitat and distribution ==
A predominantly saprophytic species, Morchella rufobrunnea fruit bodies grow solitary or in clusters in disturbed soil or woodchips used in landscaping. Large numbers can appear the year after wood mulch has been spread on the ground. Typical disturbed habitats include fire pits, near compost piles, logging roads, and dirt basements. Fruiting usually occurs in the spring, although fruit bodies can be found in these habitats most of the year.

In the American continent, Morchella rufobrunnea ranges from Mexico through California and Oregon. It has been hypothesised to have been introduced to central Michigan from California and is one of seven Morchella species that have been recorded in Mexico. In 2009, Israeli researchers used molecular genetics to confirm the identity of the species in northern Israel, where it was found growing in gravelly disturbed soil near a newly paved path at the edge of a grove. This was the first documented appearance of the fungus outside the American continent. Unlike North American populations that typically fruit for only a few weeks in spring, the Israeli populations have a long-season ecotype, fruiting from early November to late May (winter and spring). This period corresponds to the rainy season in Israel (October to May), with low to moderate temperatures ranging from 15–28 °C (59–82 °F) during the day and 5–15 °C (41–59 °F) at night.

In Cyprus, the fungus is frequently reported from coastal, urban and suburban areas under olive trees (Olea europaea). It has also been reported from the island of Malta and Switzerland.

== Cultivation ==
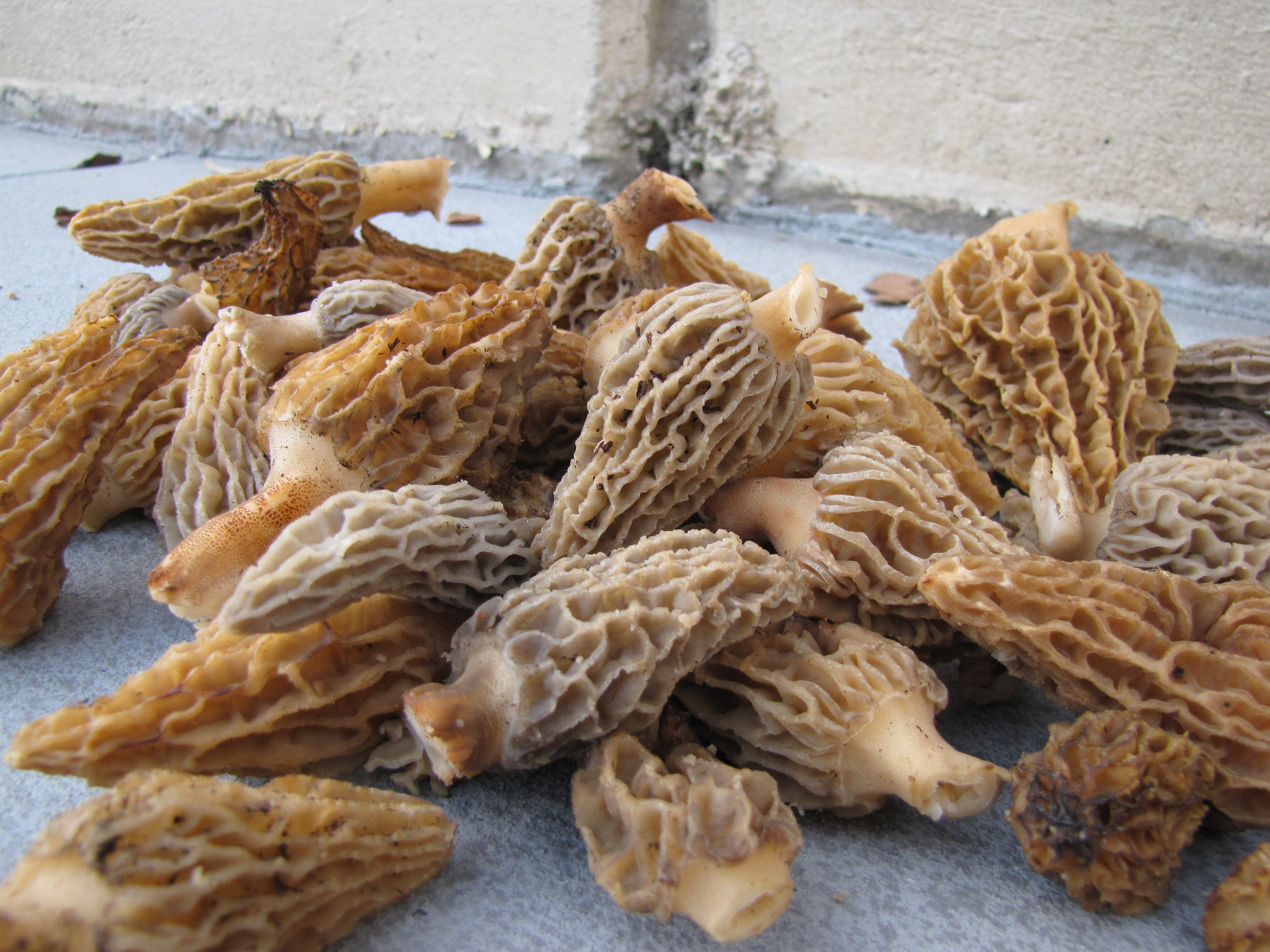
A collection of mature specimens from San Francisco, US

Morchella rufobrunnea is the morel that is cultivated commercially per US patents 4594809 and 4757640. This process was developed in 1982 by Ronald Ower with what he thought was Morchella esculenta; M. rufobrunnea had not yet been described. The cultivation protocol consists of preparing a spawn culture that is mixed with nutrient-poor soil. This mixture is laid on nutrient-rich soil and kept sufficiently moist until fruiting. In the nutrient-poor substrate, the fungus forms sclerotia—hardened masses of mycelia that serve as food reserves. Under appropriate environmental conditions, these sclerotia grow into morels.

The fruit bodies of Morchella rufobrunnea have been cultivated under controlled conditions in laboratory-scale experiments. Primordia, which are tiny nodules from which fruit bodies develop, appeared two to four weeks after the first watering of pre-grown sclerotia incubated at a temperature of 16 to 22 °C (61 to 72 °F) and 90% humidity. Mature fruit bodies grew to 7 to 15 cm (3 to 6 in) long.

The early stages of fruit body development can be divided into four discrete stages. In the first, disk-shaped knots measuring 0.5–1.5 mm (0.02–0.06 in) appear on the surface of the substrate. As the knot expands in size, a primordial stipe emerges from its center. The stipe lengthens, orients upward, and two types of hyphal elements develop: long, straight and smooth basal hairy hyphae and short stipe hyphae, some of which are inflated and project out of a cohesive layer of tightly packed hyphal elements. In the final stage, which occurs when the stipe is 2–3 mm (0.08–0.12 in) long, immature caps appear that have ridges and pits with distinct filament-like paraphyses. Extracellular mucilage that covers the ridge layer imparts shape and rigidity to the tissue and probably protects it against dehydration.
