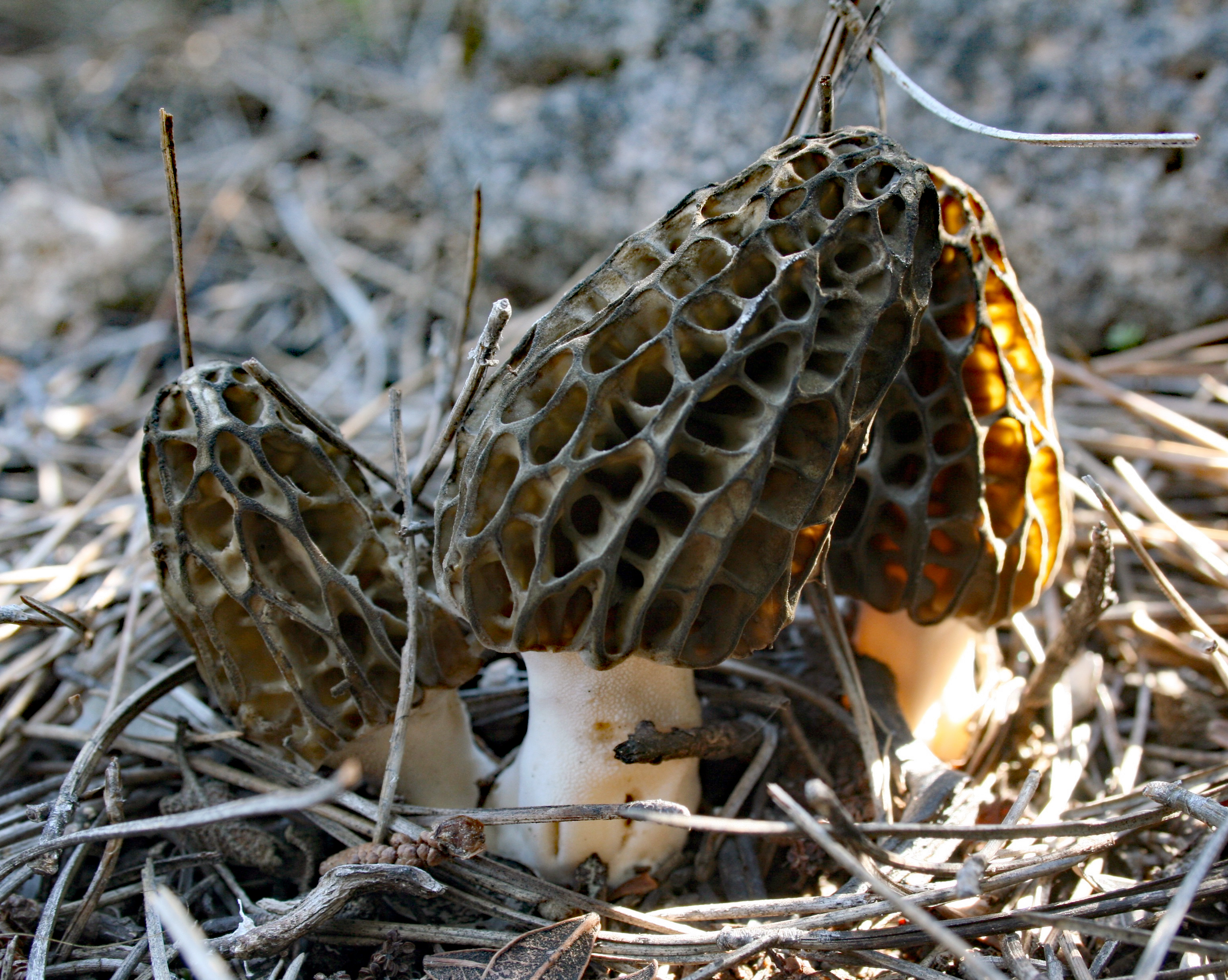

Scientific classification
- Kingdom: Fungi
- Division: Ascomycota
- Class: Pezizomycetes
- Order: Pezizales
- Family: Morchellaceae
- Genus: Morchella
- Species: M. dunalii

Binomial name
- Morchella dunalii Boud. (1887)

Synonyms
- Morchella fallax Clowez & Luc Martin (2012)

= Morchella dunalii =

Species of fungus

Morchella dunalii is a species of fungus in the family Morchellaceae (Ascomycota). A widespread species in the Mediterranean basin, M. dunalii is so far known from the Balearic Islands, the islands of Corsica and Cyprus, France, Spain and Turkey, where it appears to be abundant. It fruits very early in the season on calcareous soil, usually in association with the Aleppo pine (Pinus halepensis), Calabrian pine (Pinus brutia) and holm oak (Quercus ilex).

== Taxonomy and phylogeny ==
Morchella dunalii was described with a watercolour plate in 1887 by French mycologist Emile Boudier, based on a collection from the Montpellier area. For unknown reasons, Boudier did not include M. dunalii in his 1897 monograph and the species remained very poorly known, not appearing in any of the popular literature or monographic works on the genus. The revival of the name is owed to Moreau and colleagues, who in 2011 designated a lectotype based on the original watercolour painting of this forgotten taxon, discovered in the archives of Pôle Patrimoine scientifique of the University of Montpellier. Subsequent molecular phylogenetic studies by Richard and colleagues in 2014 matched this taxon to phylogenetic lineage Mel-25, previously detected by Taşkın and colleagues, and designated an epitype.

A 2016 study by Loizides and colleagues provided a detailed description, as well as notes on the ecology and distribution of M. dunalii, which appears to be the most common and widespread morel in the Mediterranean region, frequently misidentified as M. conica, M. deliciosa, M. purpurascens, or M. rielana.

Phylogenetically, M. dunallii is the sister species of M. kakiicolor. The taxon Morchella fallax, proposed by Clowez in 2012, is a later synonym of this species.

== Description ==
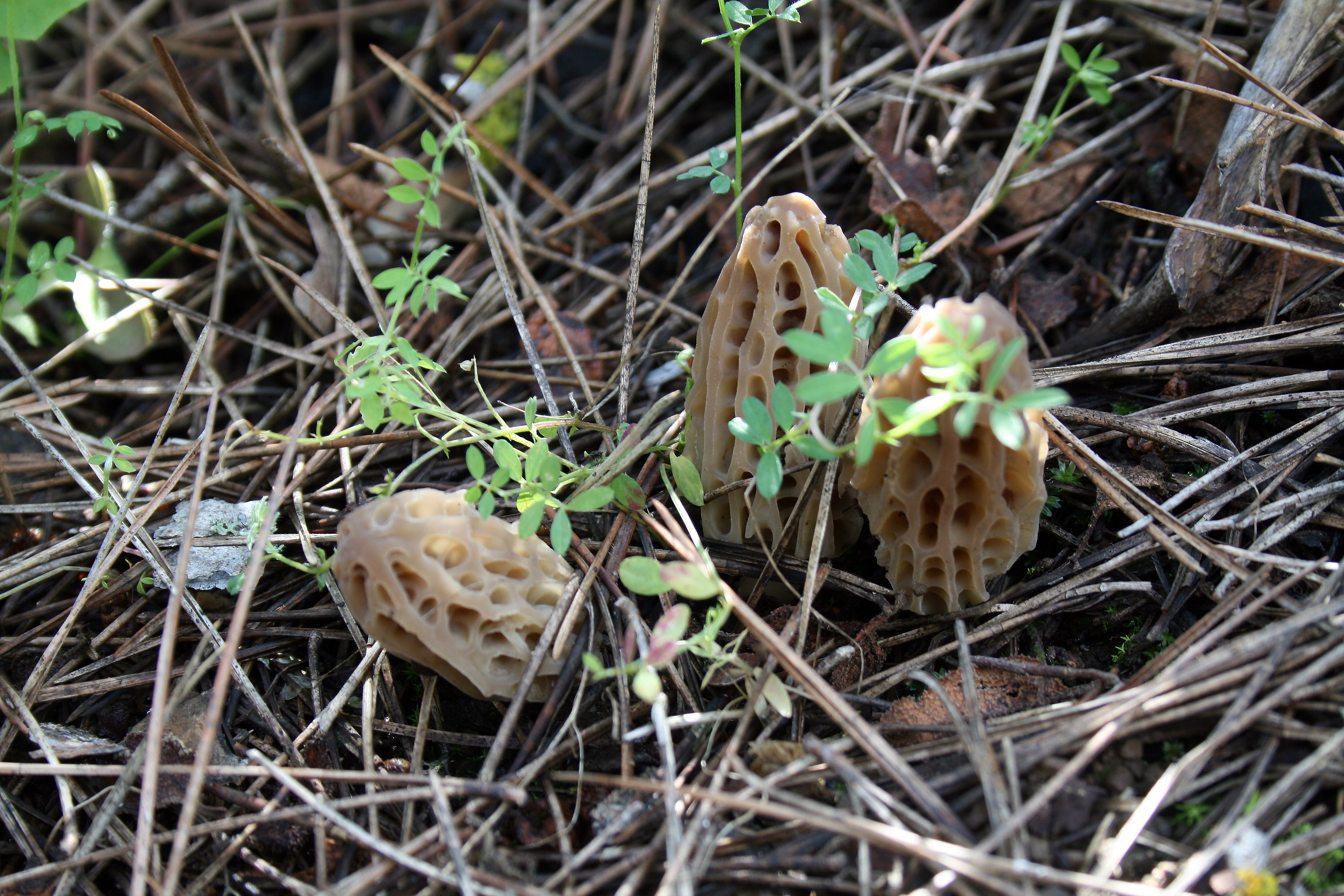
Immature fruit bodies with uniformly pale colours.

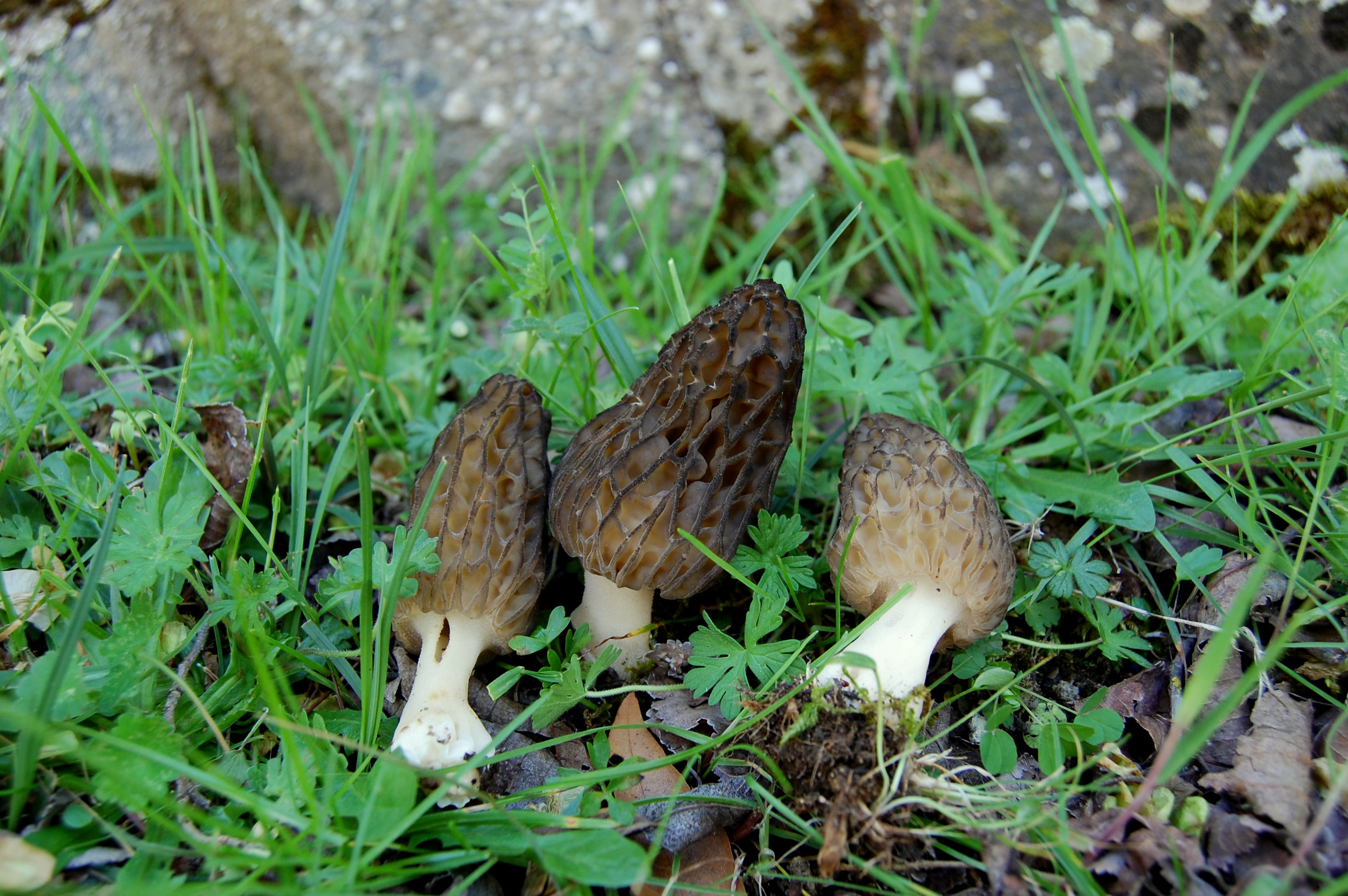
Mature fruit bodies with darkening ridges.

=== Morphology ===
The fruit bodies are medium-sized to large, fleshy and have a short stipe proportionately to the cap, which is often submerged into the substrate. The cap is 4–8(–10) cm high by 2–5(–8) cm wide, broadly conical, cylindrical or ovoid, pale beige, buff, or olivaceous-buff when immature, gradually darkening to grayish-brown or olivaceous-gray. It is attached to the stipe with a broad, rounded sinus. The longitudinal primary ridges are moderately spaced to dense, thick, glabrous and partially anastomosed, at first the same colour as the pits, but gradually becoming pinkish-purple, sepia and finally black in full maturity, creating a sharp contrast with the pits which usually remain pale. There are numerous interconnecting ridges forming multiple sunken pits. The pits are distinctly rounded to somewhat elongated and more or less vertically arranged. The stipe is typically short, 2–4(–8) by 1.5–3(–4) cm, more or less cylindrical, weakly wrinkled and inflated at the base. The flesh is thick, with a strong, sweet odour.

The ascospores are rather small, measuring (17–)17.5–23(– 26) × (10.5–)11–15(–16) μm, broadly elliptical to elliptical, hyaline (translucent) and appearing smooth under a light microscope, but when viewed in lactophenol cotton blue or under a scanning electron microscope, they are faintly roughened. The asci (spore-bearing cells) measure 250–400 × 15–22 μm, are cylindrical to clavate, have eight spores and often an enlarged, rounded or clavate base.

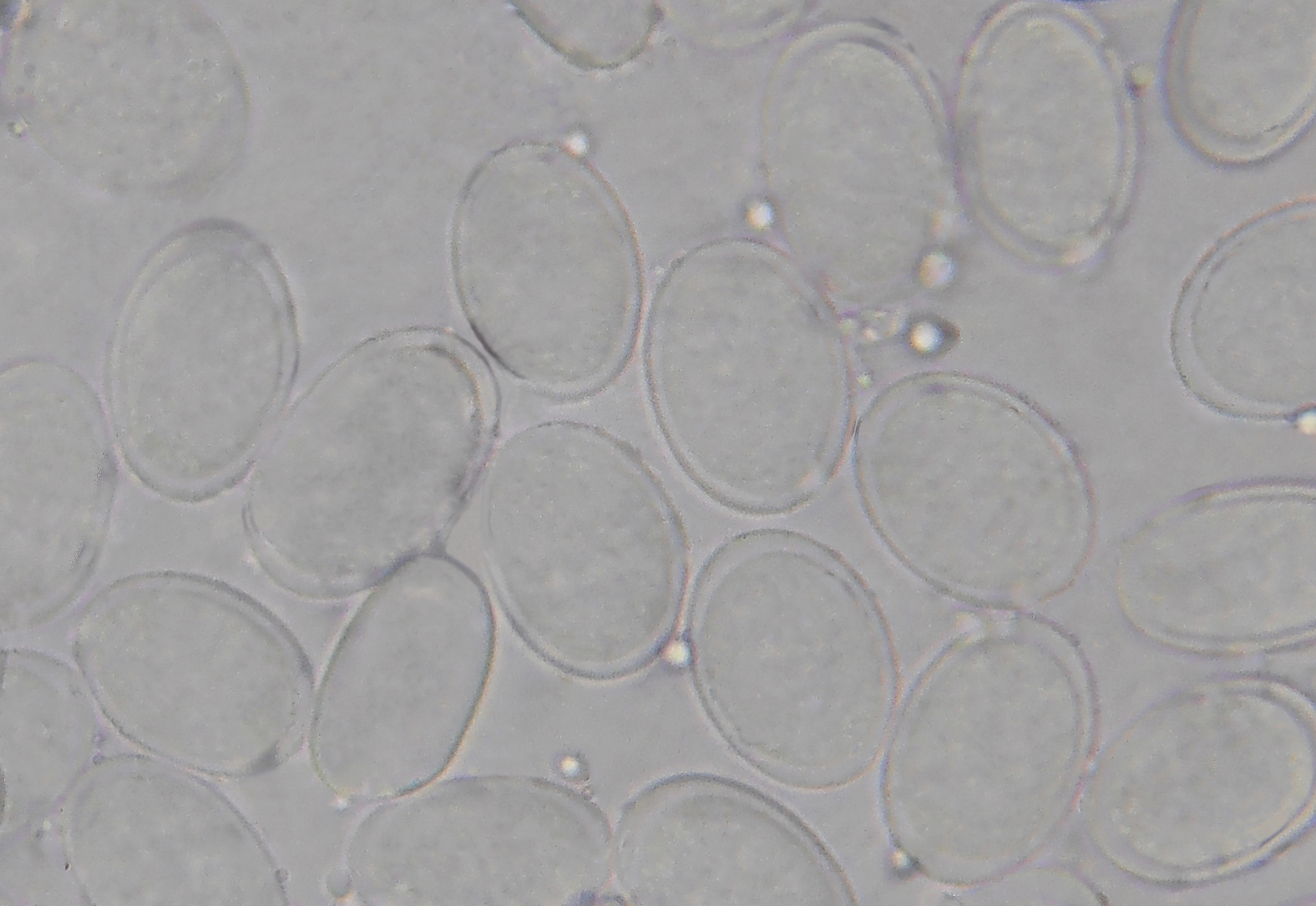
Ascospores as seen under a light microscope.

The paraphyses measure 135–200 × 13–20 μm, are cylindrical to clavate or sometimes moniliform, have 2–3(–4) septa and variously shaped and frequently enlarged tips sometimes up to 30–40 μm. The acroparaphyses (cells on the sterile ridges) measure 65–145 × 18–30(–40) μm, are clavate, capitate, subcapitate or pear-shaped, fasciculate and have 2–3 septa. The stipe surface is composed of variously sized catenulate elements, with scattered clavate to subcapitate terminal elements measuring 55–110 × 5–25 μm.

=== Similar species ===
- Morchella deliciosa is similar to M. dunalii, but produces more acutely conical fruit bodies with anastomosed or flexuous primary ridges forming elongated and angular primary pits. Microscopically, it has markedly slimmer, cylindrical, papillate to subcapitate acroparaphyses up to 9–12.5 μm wide and larger spores measuring 23–27 × 12.5– 16 μm. It is usually found in high elevation forests of Larix, Picea and Pinus.
- Morchella purpurascens usually produces slender fruit bodies with an elongated stipe. Microscopically, it has longer, clavate acroparaphyses up to 45 μm wide, slender paraphyses up to 12 μm wide, and larger, longitudinally striate spores when viewed in lactophenol cotton blue or under a scanning electron microscope.
- Morchella kakiicolor, so far known only from the Canary Islands and Spain, produces long and slender fruit bodies with more or less ladder-like secondary ridges. Microscopically, it has more slender, cylindrical paraphyses up to 20–25 μm wide, and shorter terminal elements on the stipe measuring 15–75 × 8–22 μm.

== Edibility ==
Like all morel species, Morchella dunalii is edible and choice, provided it is thoroughly cooked.

== Ecology and distribution ==
Morchella dunalii is widespread in the Mediterranean basin but absent elsewhere. So far, its presence has been phylogenetically verified in the Balearic Islands, Corsica, Cyprus, France, Spain and Turkey. It is one of the first morels to appear early in the season, fruiting solitary or in small groups in late winter or early spring with a strong preference for calcareous soils. Although its trophic status is not yet known with certainty, it is strongly suspected to be a biotroph and regularly fruiting under specific trees and shrubs. Most frequently associated tree species include the Aleppo pine (Pinus halepensis), the Calabrian pine (Pinus brutia), and holm oaks (Quercus ilex).
