= M. esculenta =

M. esculenta may refer to:

- Manihot esculenta, the cassava, yuca or manioc, a shrub species found in South America
- Morchella esculenta, the morel, yellow morel, common morel, true morel, morel mushroom or sponge morel, a mushroom species

== Synonyms ==
- Moronobea esculenta, a synonym for Platonia insignis, a tree species found in South America

== See also ==
- List of Latin and Greek words commonly used in systematic names#E
