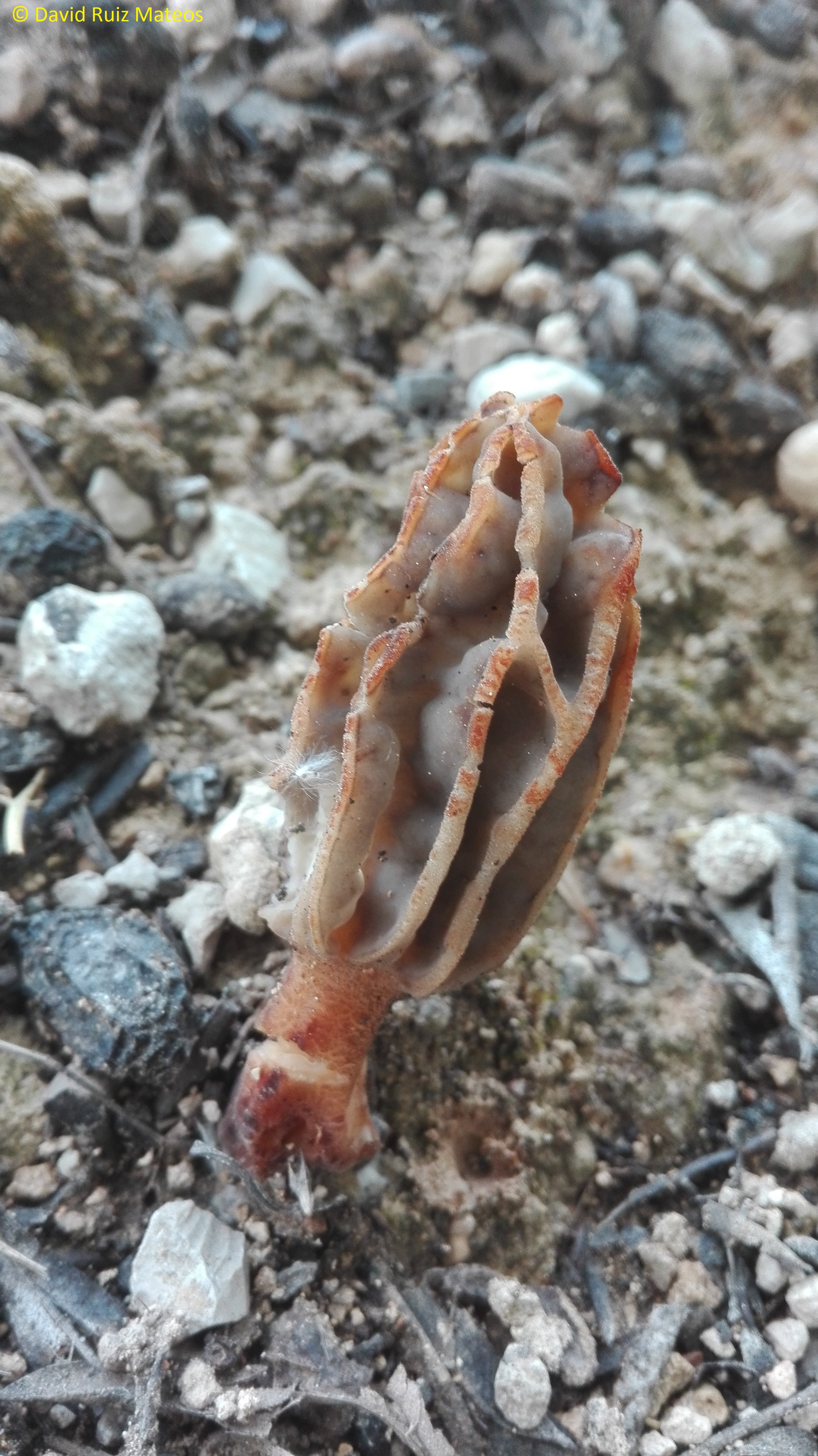
- Morchella anatolica in Sierra de Grazalema (Spain)

Scientific classification
- Kingdom: Fungi
- Division: Ascomycota
- Class: Pezizomycetes
- Order: Pezizales
- Family: Morchellaceae
- Genus: Morchella
- Species: M. anatolica

Binomial name
- Morchella anatolica Işıloğlu, Spooner, Allı & Solak (2010)

Synonyms
- M. lanceolata Clowez & Illescas, 2012 (nomen invalidum)

= Morchella anatolica =

Species of fungus

Morchella anatolica is a rare species of ascomycete fungus in the family Morchellaceae. It was described as new to science in 2010 from southwest Anatolia, Turkey, where it grows on moss-covered stream beds in pine forests. An ancient climatic relict, M. anatolica is restricted to the Mediterranean basin and has also been documented in Spain, Cyprus and Greece, where it is sometimes encountered with trees of the Oleaceae family. Together with its sister-species Morchella rufobrunnea, they are the earliest diverging lineages in genus Morchella, forming a distinct clade that is basal in global morel phylogenies. Because of its phylogenetic position, M. anatolica has been crucial in inferring the historical biogeography of the genus, which is estimated to have emerged somewhere in the Mediterranean region in the late Jurassic.

== Taxonomy ==
Morchella anatolica was described as new to science in 2010 by Işıloğlu and colleagues, following two collections from the Muğla province in southwestern Turkey. The authors described this species on the basis of its distinctive morphology and had not included any molecular phylogenetic analyses in the original publication. As a result, the phylogenetic placement of M. anatolica within the genus remained uncertain until 2012, when the isotype collection was sequenced. Updated descriptions were provided by Palazón and colleagues in 2017, by Haelewaters and colleagues in 2020, and by Loizides and colleagues in 2021.

Morchella lanceolata, proposed by Clowez in 2012 as an ad interim, is an invalid synonym of this taxon.

== Phylogeny and ancestral reconstructions ==
Early ancestral area reconstruction tests by Kerry O'Donnell and collaborators, estimated the genus Morchella to have diverged from its closest genealogical relatives some 129 million years ago (Mya), in western North America. This preliminary estimate was later revised by Du and collaborators, who pushed the date further back to the late Jurassic, at approximately 154 Mya. However, these early reconstructions had not included M. anatolica in the analyses, since no sequenced collections of this species were available at the time. Sequencing of the isotype collection of M. anatolica by Taşkın and colleagues, subsequently placed this species in the ancestral /Rufobrunnea clade, casting doubts over the conclusions of previous reconstructions since M. anatolica is absent from North America. Both basalmost lineages in the genus, M. anatolica and M. rufobrunnea, are on the other hand present in the Mediterranean region. Updated ancestral area reconstructions by Loizides and colleagues, have since revised the previous hypothesis and designated the Mediterranean basin as the most likely place of origin of morels, mainly inferred by M. anatolica's endemism to this ecoregion.

== Description ==
=== Morphology ===
The fruit bodies are rufescent and can grow to 40–100 mm (1.6–3.9 in) tall and 7–15 mm (0.28–0.59 in) wide. They are conical or acutely conical, with fleshy longitudinal ribs that remain typically pale at maturity and never darken. Young specimens have dark grey pits sometimes with a faint lilac tint, and contrasting pale ribs, but typically fade to uniformly buff or greyish-brown in maturity. Pits are large and vertically elongated, often stretching uninterrupted from the base of the pileus to the apex, with no or rare transverse interconnecting ribs that are characteristic of most other Morchella species. The stipe is bulbous at the base, weakly wrinkled and initially covered in a distinct grey pruinescence that fades in mature specimens. There is no sinus at the attachment of the pileus with the stipe.

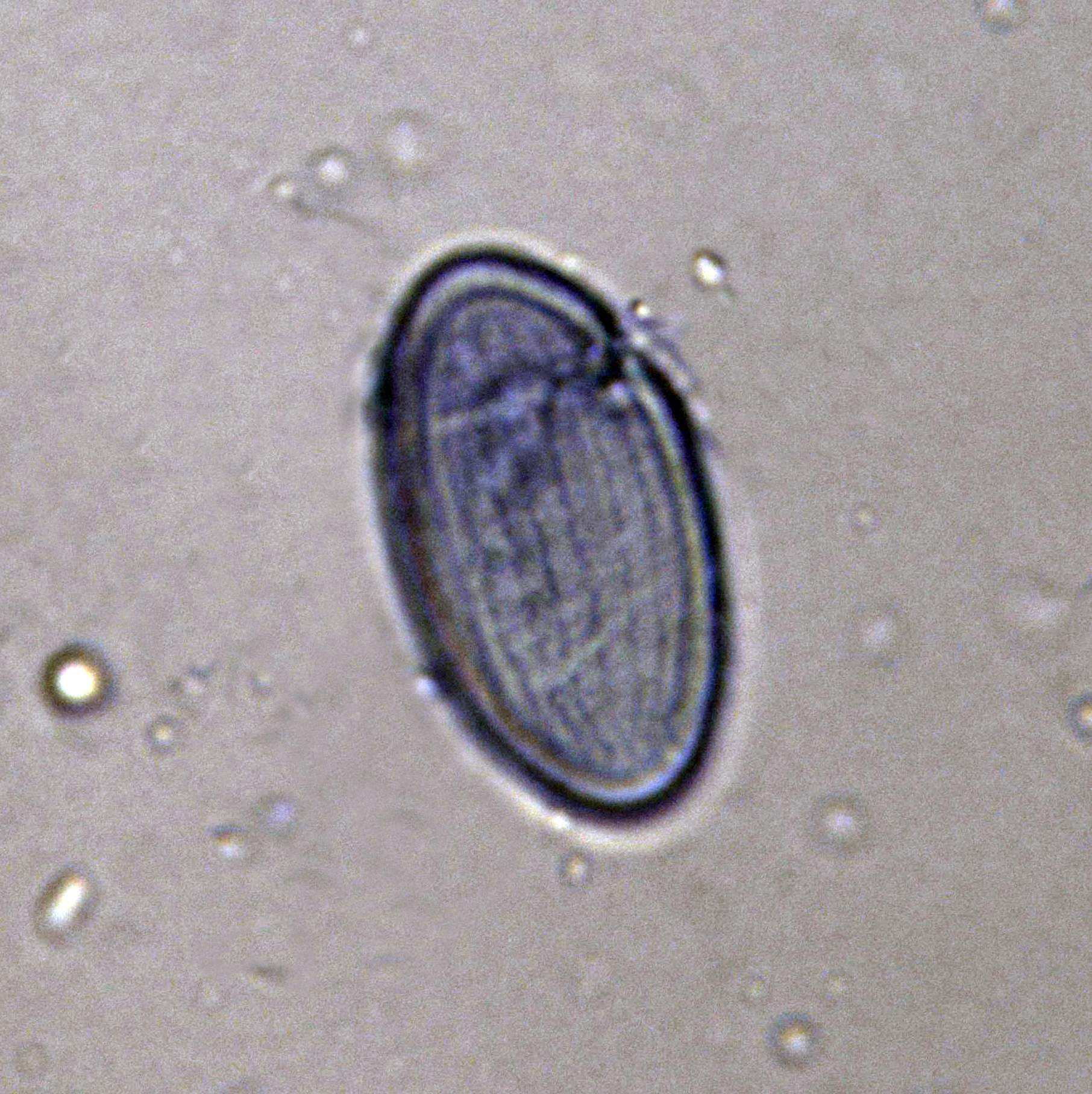
Ascospore of Morchella anatolica in lactophenol cotton blue exhibiting typical longitudinal grooves.

The ascospores are ellipsoid to broadly ellipsoid, hyaline (translucent), and measure (22.5–)24–27(–32) by (12–)13–17(–20) μm; these dimensions are relatively large for the genus Morchella. Deep longitudinal grooves are present on the surface of mature spores when viewed under a scanning electron microscope or in the appropriate staining medium. The spores are produced in groups of eight in cylindrical to club-shaped asci, measuring 266–345 by 20–26(–35) μm. The paraphyses are hyaline, slenderly cylindrical or slightly inflated, with rounded to attenuated and sometimes enlarged apices, have 1–2(–3) septa and measure 150–250 by 8.5–18 μm. The acroparaphyses, located on the sterile ribs, are fasciculate and variable in shape, have 1–4 septa and measure 60–217 by 14–30 μm. The stipe features distinctly long, subcapitate, clavate or pyriform hyphoid hairs, which are sub-hyaline to pale gray and measure (64–)89–174(–222) by 23–40 μm.

=== Culture ===
The culture colony of M. anatolica is quite fast-growing, occupying 90-mm Petri dishes in approximately 20 days, eventually reaching 30–40 mm in diameter. The mycelium is buff to pale beige, sometimes with incrustations at the colony margin. The hyphal system is composed of thick-walled, hyaline to brownish hyphae 8–14.5 μm across, with hyaline or light brownish leading hyphae 5–7.5 μm across, and more tortuous interlacing hyphae 2.5–5 μm across.

=== Similar species ===
Because of its distinctive morphology, M. anatolica can hardly be confused with other morel species in the field. Like M. anatolica, M. rufobrunnea also lacks a sinus and has ribs that remain pale at all stages of growth, while the stipe is also covered by a grey pruinescence. However, M. rufobrunnea produces larger and more robust fruit bodies with multiple interconnecting ridges forming several longitudinally arranged pits. Microscopically, M. rufobrunnea has smaller spores on average, usually ranging between 22 and 26 μm long, and has shorter hyphoid hairs on the stipe, rarely exceeding 100 μm.

== Ecology and distribution ==
Morchella anatolica appears to be very rare and narrowly endemic to the Mediterranean basin. It is thought to be a climatic relict that may once have had a wider distribution that shrank during the Quaternary glaciations. In vitro cultures suggest that, like its sister-species M. rufobrunnea, M. anatolica may grow as a saprotroph. However, few collections in the wild have been found in close vicinity to Olea europaea and Fraxinus angustifolia, suggesting that the fungus may be able to form facultative associations with plants of the Oleaceae family.

So far, M. anatolica is known only from Turkey, Spain, the island of Cyprus, and the Greek islands of Kefalonia, Lesvos and Zakynthos.
