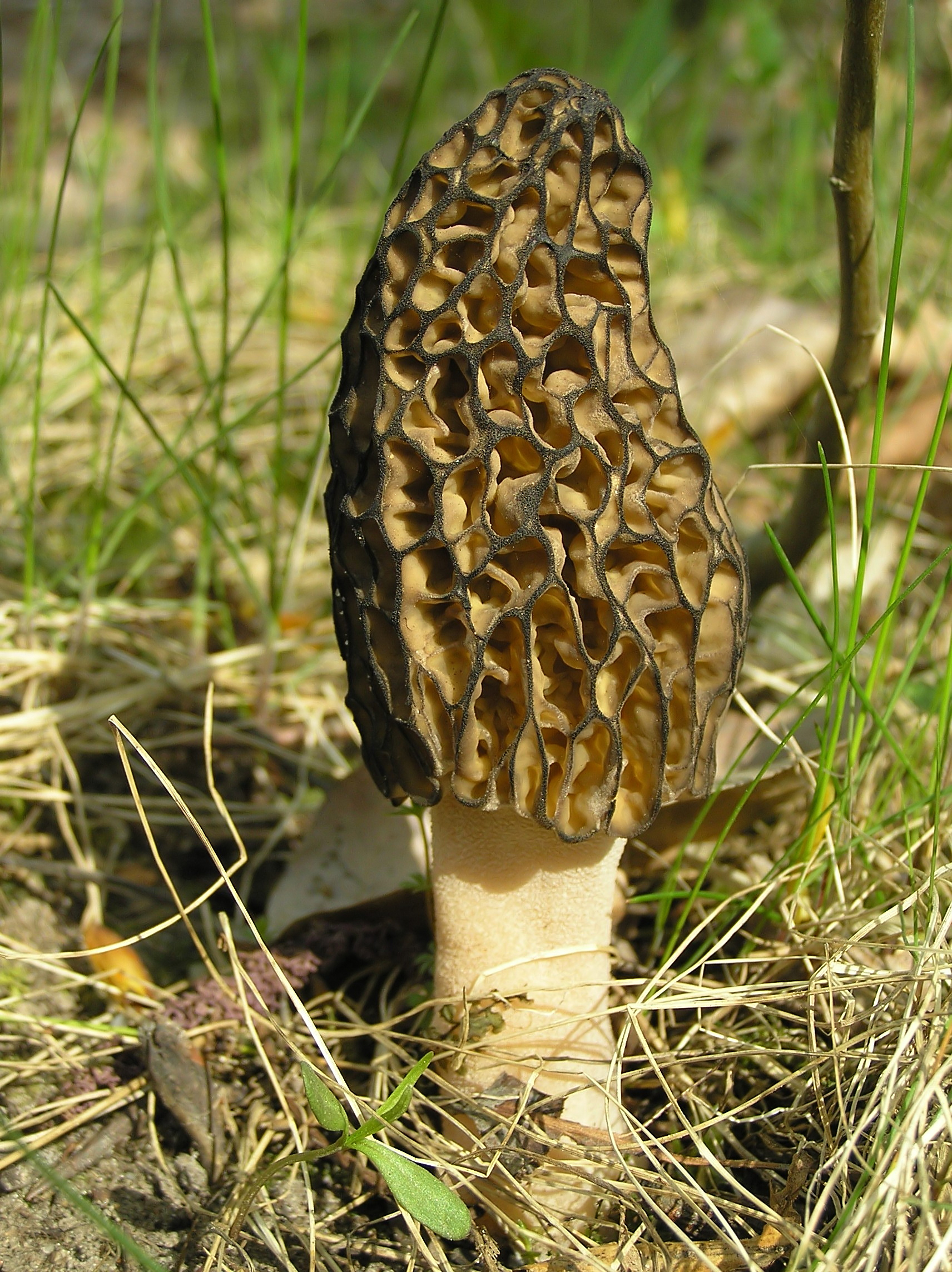

Scientific classification
- Kingdom: Fungi
- Division: Ascomycota
- Class: Pezizomycetes
- Order: Pezizales
- Family: Morchellaceae
- Genus: Morchella
- Species: M. conica

Binomial name
- Morchella conica Pers.

Synonyms
- Morchella esculenta var. conica (Pers.) Fr.

= Morchella conica =

Species of fungus

Morchella conica
- Mycological characteristics
- Smooth hymenium
- Cap is conical
- Hymenium attachment is not applicable
- Stipe is bare
- Spore print is cream
- Edibility is choice or poisonous

Morchella conica is an old binomial name previously applied to species of fungi in the family Morchellaceae. It is one of three scientific names that had been commonly used to describe black morels, the others being M. angusticeps and M. elata. It was first introduced by mycologist Christian Hendrik Persoon in 1818, as a superfluous name for the old taxon Morchella continua. According to Richard and colleagues, Fries’ sanctioning applies only at the subgeneric level and the name is illegitimate.

Throughout the years, the name M. conica has been invariably applied to many different species by different authors, and DNA analysis in 2014 revealed that morels identified as "M. conica" indeed belonged to Morchella deliciosa, Morchella purpurascens, Morchella tridentina, and Morchella vulgaris.
