= Morchella kakiicolor =

Scientific classification
- Domain: Eukaryota
- Kingdom: Fungi
- Division: Ascomycota
- Class: Pezizomycetes
- Order: Pezizales
- Family: Morchellaceae
- Genus: Morchella
- Species: M. kakiicolor

Binomial name
- Morchella kakiicolor (Clowez & L. Romero) Clowez, L. Romero, P. Alvarado & Loizides (2015)

Synonyms
- Morchella quercus-ilicis f. kakiicolor Clowez & L. Romero (2012)

Species of fungus

Morchella kakiicolor is a species of fungus in the family Morchellaceae (Ascomycota). It was originally proposed as a form of Morchella quercus-ilicis in a 2012 study by Philippe Clowez, but was later re-combined as an autonomous species by Loizides and colleagues, based on molecular phylogenetic data. In the same study, M. quercus-ilicis f. quercus-ilicis was shown by the authors to be a later synonym of the old taxon Morchella tridentina, and not phylogenetically related to M. kakiicolor.

Morchella kakiicolor is phylogenetically and morphologically very close to the widespread Mediterranean species Morchella dunalii. So far, this apparently rare morel is only known from Spain and the Canary Islands.
