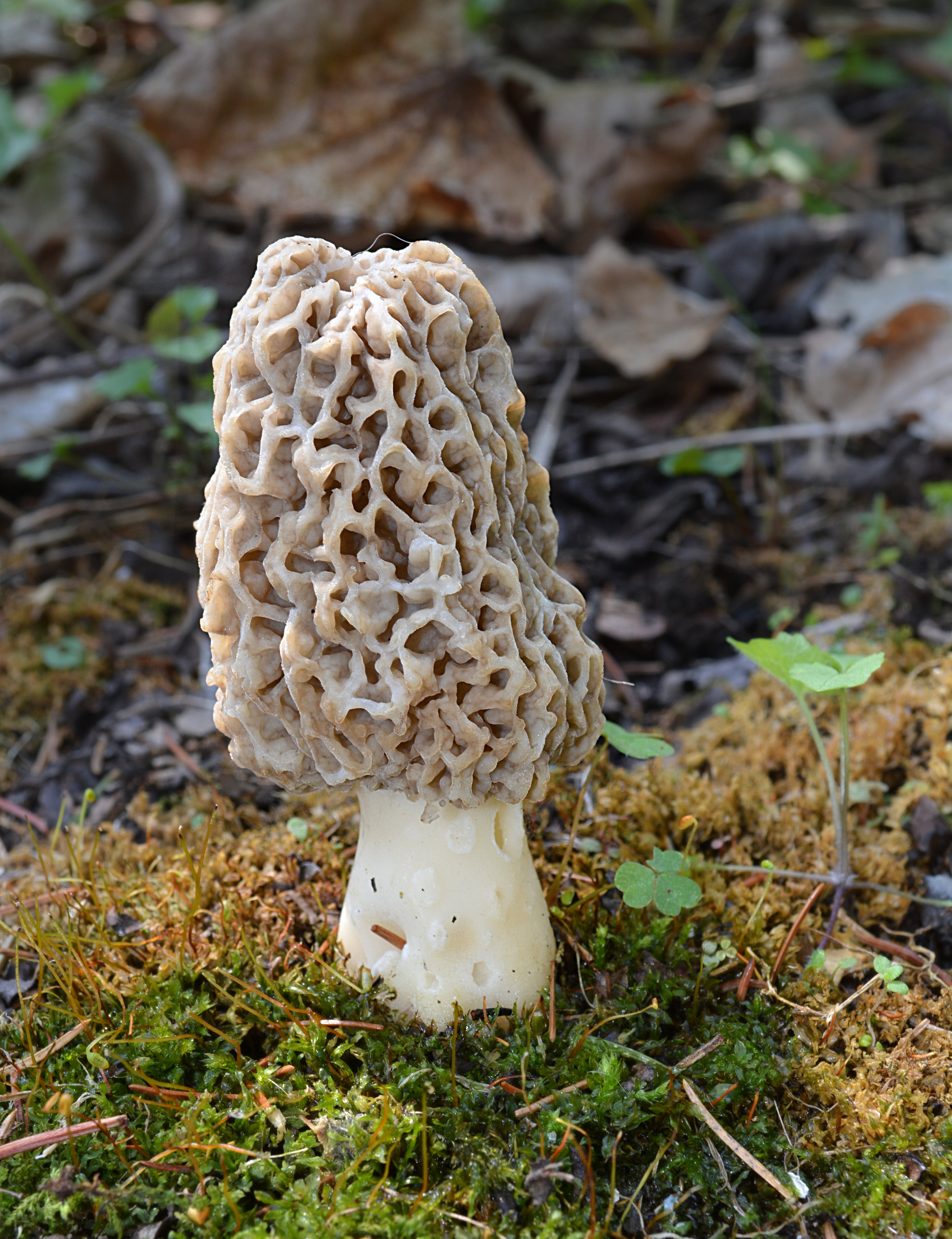

Scientific classification
- Domain: Eukaryota
- Kingdom: Fungi
- Division: Ascomycota
- Class: Pezizomycetes
- Order: Pezizales
- Family: Morchellaceae
- Genus: Morchella
- Species: M. americana

Binomial name
- Morchella americana Clowez & Matherly (2012)

= Morchella americana =

Species of fungus

Morchella americana (also called the yellow morel) is a North American species of fungus in the family Morchellaceae.

== Taxonomy ==
The species was described as new to science in 2012. In 2014, Richard et al. clarified its taxonomic status, retaining the name Morchella americana of Clowez and Matherly (2012) over M. esculentoides.

=== Etymology ===
The specific epithet americana refers to the species' occurrence in North America.

== Description ==
The cone-shaped cap is rounded or pointed, about 3–10 centimetres (1–4 inches) tall with a honeycomb-like network of ridged openings. The whitish stipe is shorter than the cap, sometimes bulbous, wrinkled and/or stained yellow, and hollow. The spore print is off-white.

=== Similar species ===
In the Great Lakes region of eastern North America, the range of M. americana overlaps with M. ulmaria; the two species cannot be reliably distinguished without DNA sampling. Other similar species include M. diminutiva, M. prava and others in the genus, in addition to Verpa bohemica and Gyromitra species.

== Distribution and habitat ==
Found throughout North America except the Gulf Coast, the species is common east of the Rocky Mountains in a range stretching from Ontario south to Texas, Arkansas, Alabama, Georgia and South Carolina. In western North America, the species typically is found under hardwood, especially cottonwood trees in river bottoms, or with apple trees or ashes in forest, riparian or urban settings.

M. americana, identified as phylogenetic species "Mes-4", has also been found in Turkey, France, and Germany, but is suspected of having been introduced to Europe from North America.
