= Morchella guatemalensis =

Scientific classification
- Domain: Eukaryota
- Kingdom: Fungi
- Division: Ascomycota
- Class: Pezizomycetes
- Order: Pezizales
- Family: Morchellaceae
- Genus: Morchella
- Species: M. guatemalensis

Binomial name
- Morchella guatemalensis Guzmán, M.F.Torres & Logem. (1985)

Species of fungus

Morchella guatemalensis is a species of ascomycete fungus in the family Morchellaceae. Described as new to science in 1985, it is found in Chimaltenango Department (Guatemala), where it grows in oak and cypress woodland. The fruit body has a white stipe and orangish cap.
