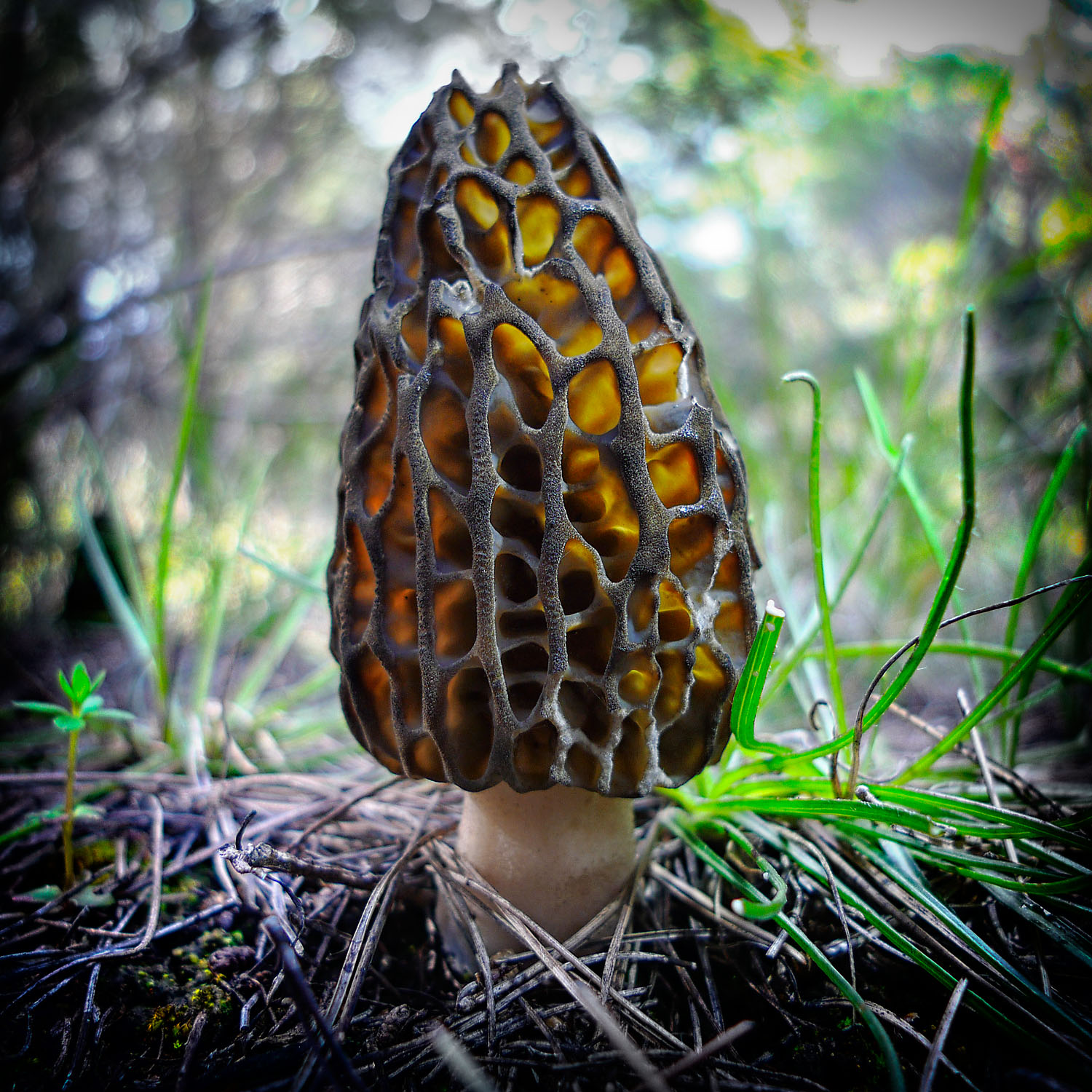

Scientific classification
- Domain: Eukaryota
- Kingdom: Fungi
- Division: Ascomycota
- Class: Pezizomycetes
- Order: Pezizales
- Family: Morchellaceae
- Genus: Morchella
- Species: M. purpurascens

Binomial name
- Morchella purpurascens (Krombh. ex Boud.) Jacquet. (1984)

Synonyms
- Morchella elata var. purpurascens Krombh. ex Boud. (1897)

= Morchella purpurascens =

Species of fungus

Morchella purpurascens, the purple morel, is an ascomycete fungus in the family Morchellaceae. It was first described as a variety of Morchella elata by Emile Boudier in 1897, based on a plate previously illustrated by Julius Vincenz von Krombholz. It was then recombined as a distinct species in 1985 by Emile Jacquetant, and validated the following year by Jacquetant and Bon. As with many other morel species, its taxonomical status remained for a long time a subject of debate, until an extensive phylogenetic and nomenclatural study in 2014 by Richard and colleagues confirmed this species' autonomy and matched it to phylogenetic lineage Mel-20.

The species is characterised by the pinkish or purplish colours on the cap of its young fruit bodies.
