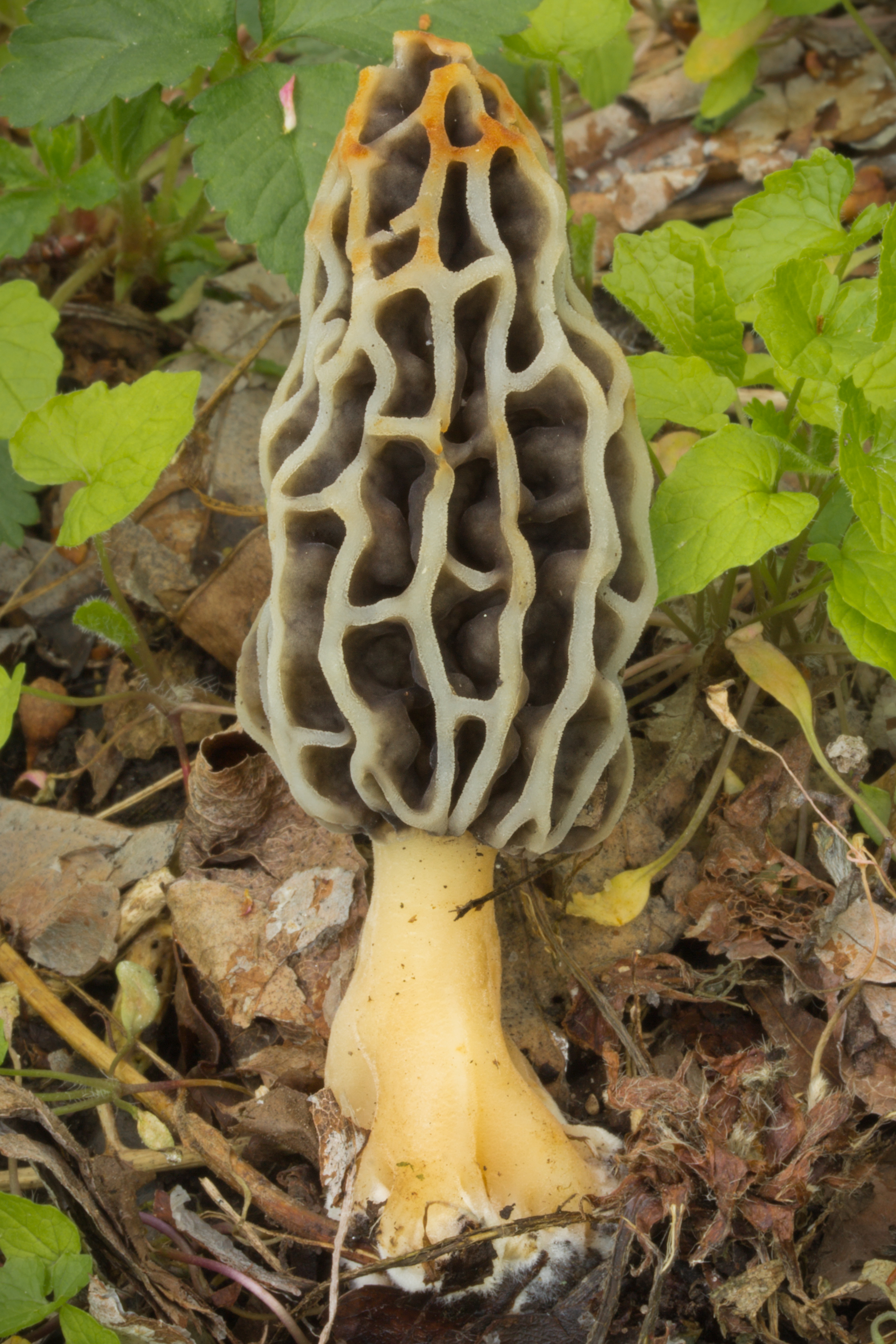

Scientific classification
- Domain: Eukaryota
- Kingdom: Fungi
- Division: Ascomycota
- Class: Pezizomycetes
- Order: Pezizales
- Family: Morchellaceae
- Genus: Morchella
- Species: M. diminutiva

Binomial name
- Morchella diminutiva M.Kuo, Dewsbury, Moncalvo & S.L.Stephenson (2012)

= Morchella diminutiva =

Species of fungus

Morchella diminutiva is a species of fungus in the family Morchellaceae native to North America. Described as new to science in 2012, it occurs in eastern North America, usually near Fraxinus americana and Liriodendron tulipifera, but also under other hardwoods like species of Carya.
