= Lactophenol cotton blue =

Mixture of methyl blue and lactophenol

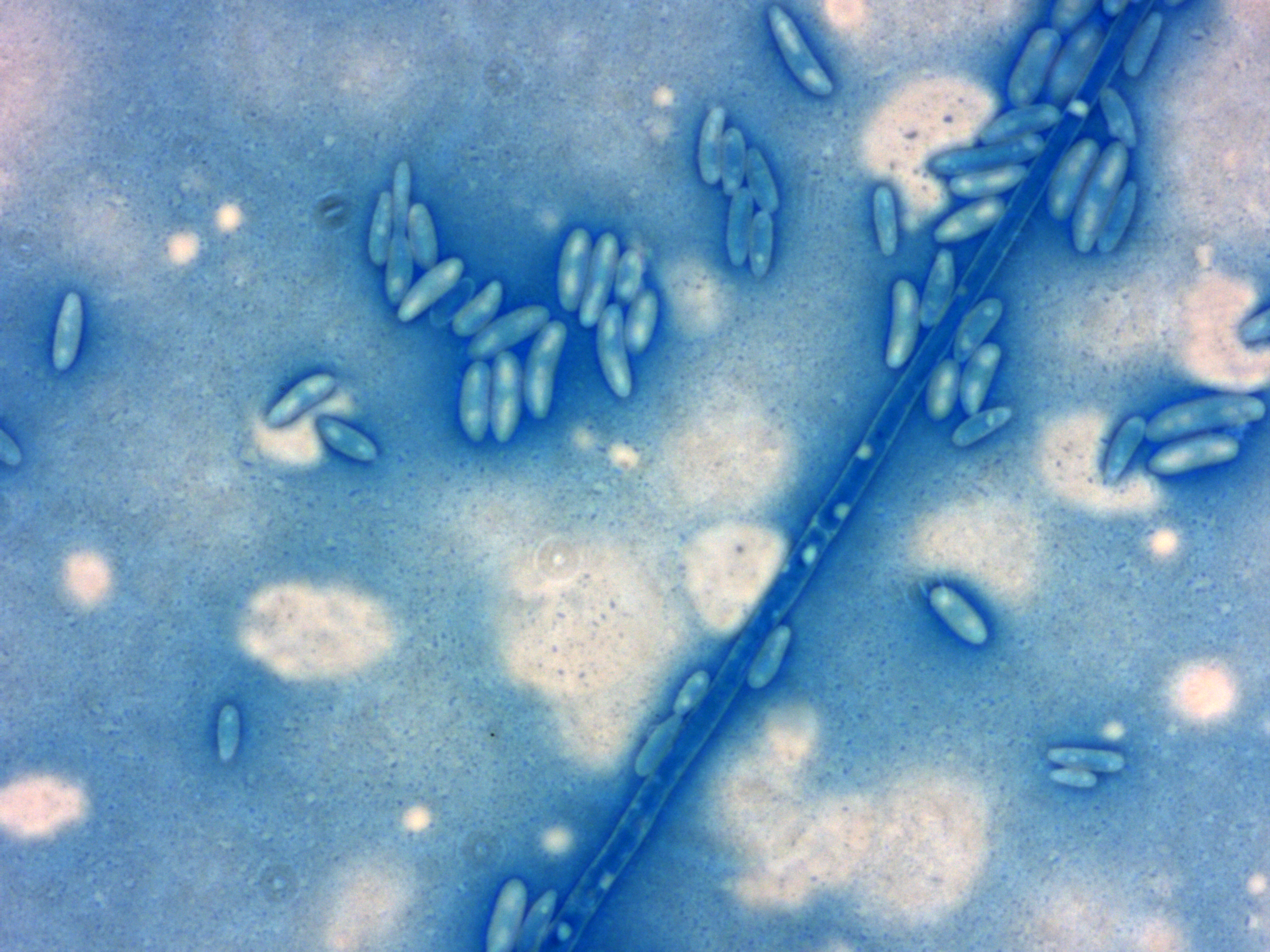
Fusarium oxysporum conidiophores stained by lactophenol cotton blue

Lactophenol cotton blue (LCB) is a mixture of methyl blue, a histological stain, and lactophenol (a solution of phenol, lactic acid, and glycerol in water). It is used in wet-mount preparations for visualization of fungal structures, especially in medical mycology.

Methyl blue stains fungal cell walls a bright cerulean color, while lactophenol acts as a stabilizer.
