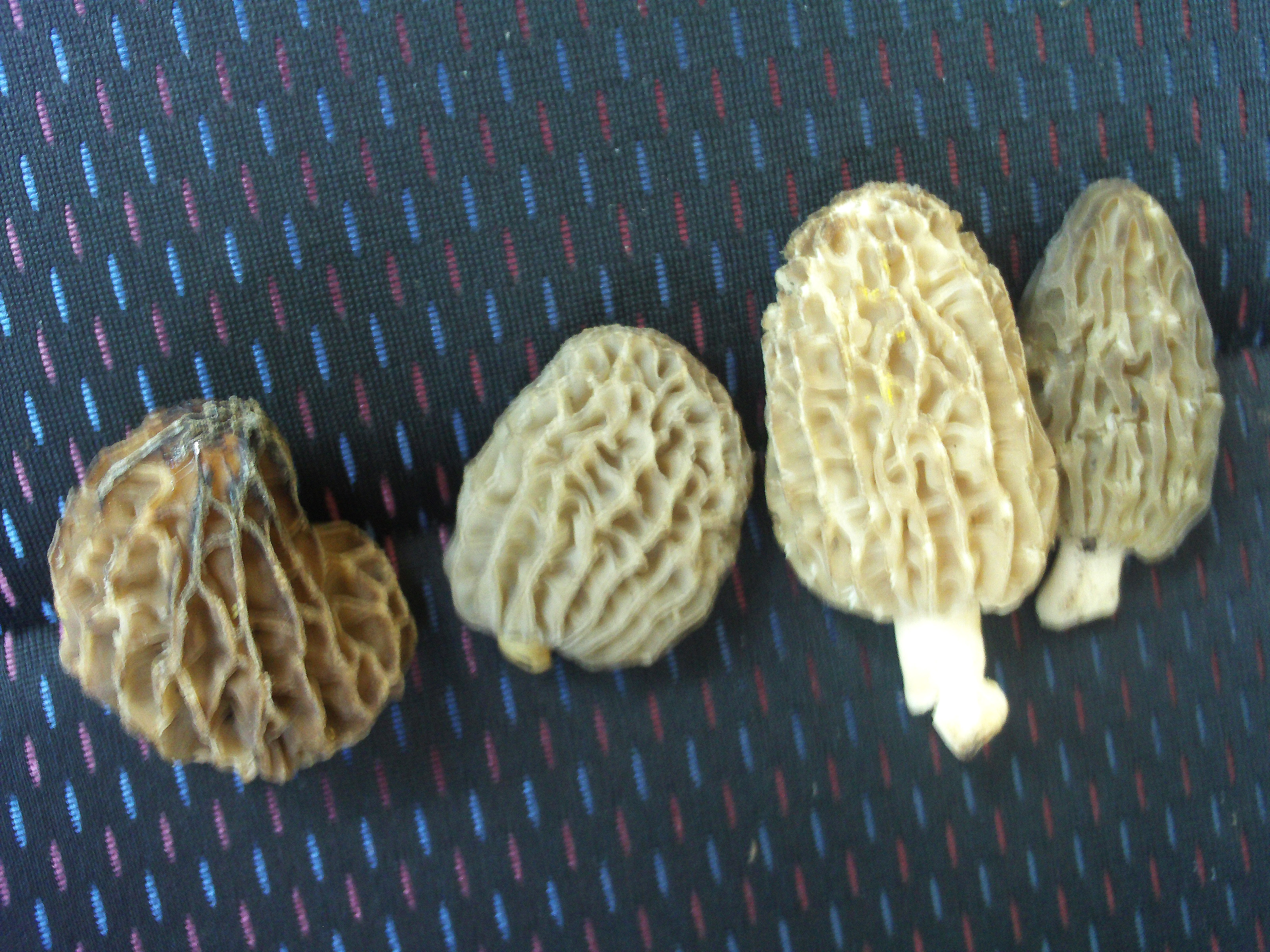

Scientific classification
- Domain: Eukaryota
- Kingdom: Fungi
- Division: Ascomycota
- Class: Pezizomycetes
- Order: Pezizales
- Family: Morchellaceae
- Genus: Morchella
- Species: M. deliciosa

Binomial name
- Morchella deliciosa Fr. (1822)

Synonyms
- Morilla deliciosa (Fr.) Quél. (1892); Morchella deliciosa var. incarnata Quél. (1892); Morchella deliciosa var. elegans Boud. (1897); Morchella deliciosa var. purpurascens Boud. (1897); Morchella conica var. deliciosa (Fr.) Cetto (1988)

= Morchella deliciosa =

Species of fungus

Morchella deliciosa is a species of edible fungus in the family Morchellaceae. It was first described scientifically by Elias Magnus Fries in 1822. It is a European species, although the name has erroneously been applied to morphologically similar North American morels.
