= Forest disturbance by invasive insects and diseases in the United States =

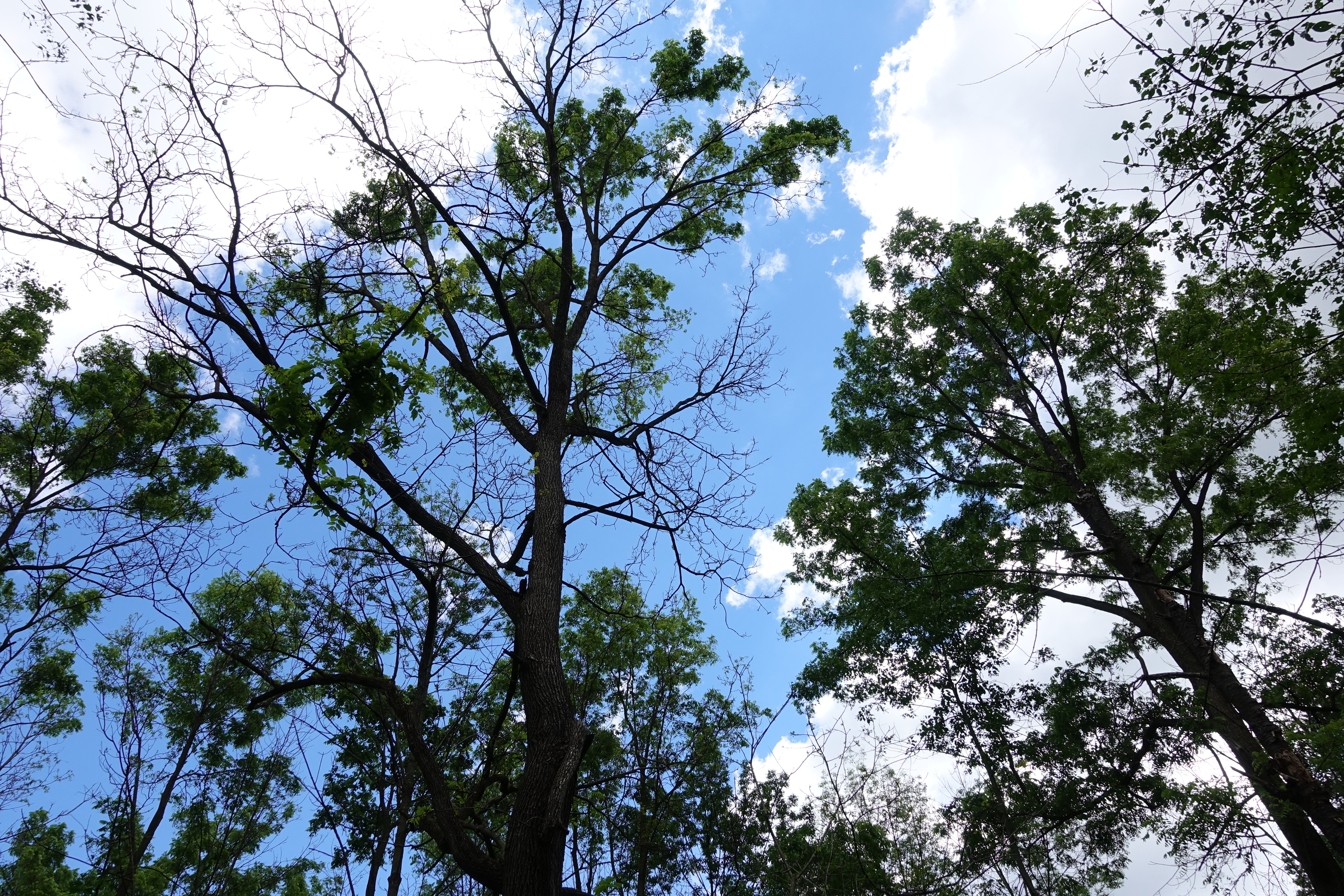
An ash-dominant forest in decline from emerald ash borer damage

Species which are not native to a forest ecosystem can act as an agent of disturbance, changing forest dynamics as they invade and spread. Invasive insects and pathogens (diseases) are introduced to the United States through international trade, and spread through means of natural and human-dispersal. Invasive insects and pathogens are a serious threat to many forests in the United States and have decimated populations of several tree species, including American chestnut, American elm, eastern hemlock, whitebark pine, and the native ash species (see extended listing below). The loss of these tree species is typically rapid with both short and long-term impacts to the forest ecosystem.

Spongy moth spread 1900-2007

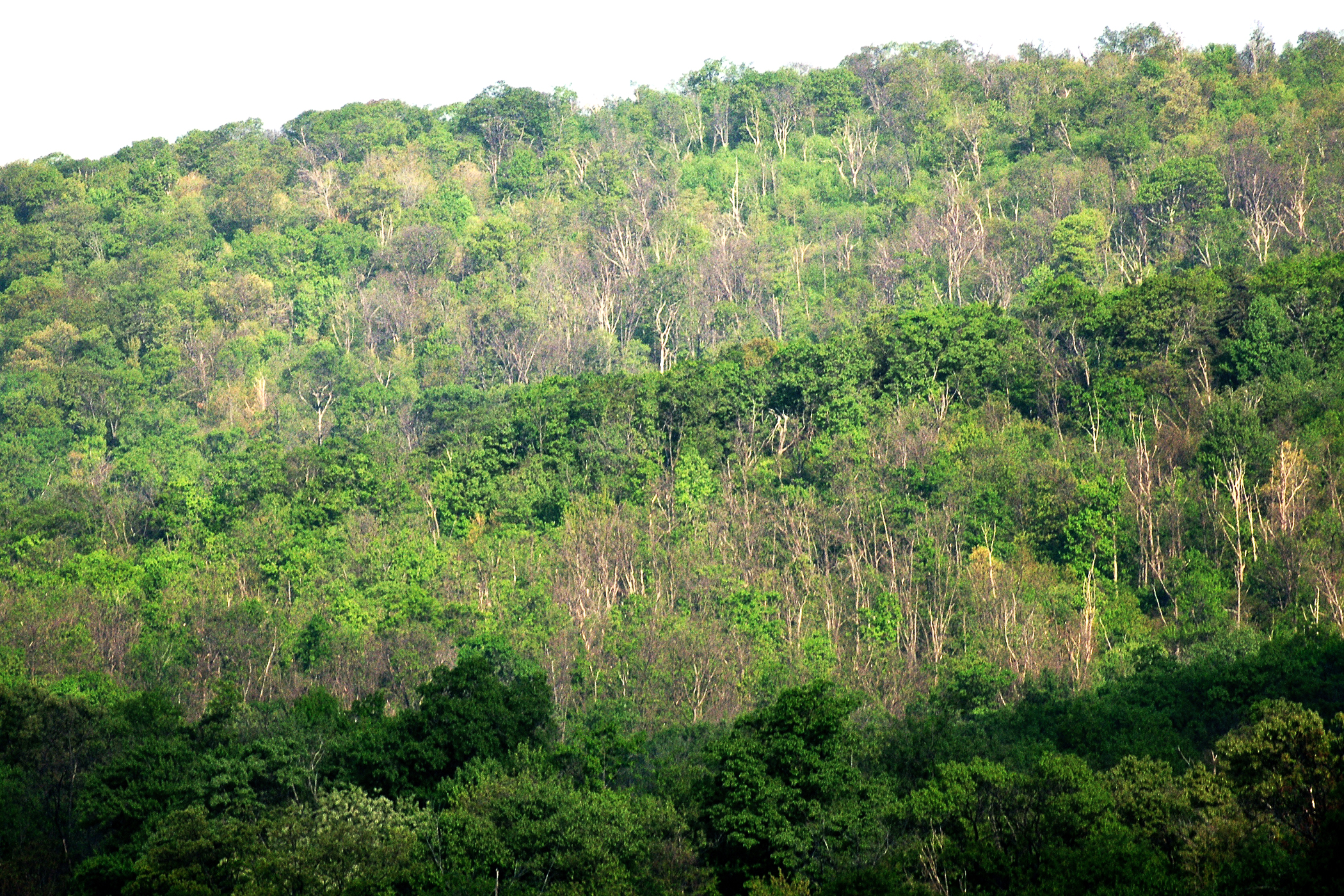
Spongy moth damage in Harper's Ferry, WV

== Pathways and spread ==
=== Pathways ===
International trade is the primary pathway for introduction of invasive insects and pathogens into the United States.

==== Live plants ====
The importation of live plants has been the pathway attributed to over 60 percent of the most damaging non-native pests to the United States. Live plants are an especially effective pathway because they provide sustenance to the pest over long journeys on otherwise inhospitable cargo ships. Notable early examples of live plant harbored pests—such as beech scale, chestnut blight, and white pine blister rust—led to the Plant Quarantine Act of 1912 and regulations from the US Department of Agriculture in 1919. Despite these and subsequent regulations, insects and pathogens have continued to be introduced through live plants.

==== Wood products ====
Wood products—including wood packaging material—are the second most common pathway, accounting for about 30 percent of the most damaging non-native pests to the United States. These low quality wood products, like crating and pallets, often retain the outer part of the tree (bark and phloem) where insect life can be harbored.

==== Other ====
Other less common pathways include "hitchhiking" on cargo ships and containers and in air passenger baggage.

=== Spread ===
Once introduced into forests of the United States, invasive insects and pathogens can spread in two ways: natural and human-assisted dispersal. The rate of human-assisted dispersal can be erratic and cause the pest to invade distant, discrete locations. The rate of natural dispersal varies depending on the adaptations of the pest species but is more diffuse, spreading outward from the invaded area. A typical dispersal of invasive insects and pathogens is characterized by both means: diffuse spread coupled with long-distance "jumps" to discrete areas.

==== Natural dispersal ====
Pathogens can spread through the air, water, or on insect and animal vectors (hosts). Dutch elm disease was spread by elm bark beetles, yet the tree mortality was caused by a pathogen. Chestnut blight is a fungus spread through wind dispersal and rain splatter; the blight traveled up to 50 miles in a year by natural means. Insect pests, once they reach the adult phase, have the ability to disperse by flight. Emerald ash borer beetles can travel over seven kilometers per day. The Asian long-horned beetle, however, usually stays with the tree it matured on, maintaining localized natural spread.

==== Human-assisted dispersal ====
Human-assisted spread can cause invasive insects or pathogens to "jump" to new and often distant locations. The transported pest may then spread by natural means, forming new, discrete populations. A significant means of human-assisted spread is through transportation of infected firewood. For example, discrete populations of emerald ash borer have been traced to remote campsites where natural spread would not have been possible.

== Forest impacts ==
Non-native invasive species can disrupt ecosystems because they do not have natural predators, or other ecological checks-and-balances. Thus, with less competition from native species, non-native populations can explode. Invasive insects and pathogens have eliminated entire tree species from forests of the United States in as little as decades. This rapid change in forest composition has consequences for the entire ecosystem. The extent of the impact depends on characteristics of both the pest and host tree.

Pests differ in their means of attack and extent of damage. For example, defoliating insect (spongy moth) may weaken trees but not directly cause mortality, while boring insects (emerald ash borer) can often cause serious damage. A pathogen may slowly weaken a tree (beech bark disease) or it may cause rapid decline (chestnut blight). A pest may attack a specific species (hemlock woolly adelgid) or it may attack several species (emerald ash borer) or species across many genera (Asian long-horned beetle).

The impacts to the forest also differ depending on characteristics of the host tree. The decline of a more dominant tree (American chestnut) or one that fills a unique role (such as a nitrogen fixer) has a greater impact. A pioneer tree species, one that is able to quickly regenerate after a disturbance, may be able to reassert its role in the forest while a climax tree species may not.

Forest impacts can be divided into two phases: short-term physical disturbance caused directly by the pest, and long-term changes in ecosystem functions in response to the disturbance.

=== Short-term ===
Short-term disturbances are physical damages directly caused by the invasive pest and are measured on a time-scale of months to years. Short-term forest productivity is reduced by significant tree mortality. For example, productivity of mixed ash forests affected by emerald ash borer were measured at around 30 percent reduction after the disturbance. Forest-productivity can be reduced even without widespread mortality. During a spongy moth outbreak, entire forests can be defoliated but then recover. However, the energy required for new foliage weakens the trees. Oaks—a favorite food source for spongy moth larva—produce a reduced acorn crop for years after a defoliating event. Animals that rely on acorns are thus affected; but some animals benefit from the spongy moth, namely those that prey on the caterpillars (larva). Understory plants can also benefit from the increased sunlight and rainfall; or they may perish if left too exposed. Nitrogen levels in the soil increase from the insect excrement, dead caterpillars, and dropped foliage.

Other short-term impacts include: changes in forest micro-climate from a more open canopy, which increases temperature and reduces humidity, decline of species in symbiotic relationships with the affected tree (Clark's nutcracker and whitebark pine), decline of specialist species (ash specialist arthropods), decline of species which rely on affected trees for habitat (black-throated green warbler and hemlock), changes in aquatic species composition from streams switching from shaded to more sun, increased erosion from loss root mass and tree cover.

=== Long-term ===
Long-term disturbances are changes in the way the forest ecosystem functions as a result of the disturbance event and are measured in decades to centuries. Changes in the forest ecosystem are primarily a result of changes in forest structure and species composition. American chestnut used to compose up to 50 percent of the canopy in many eastern deciduous forest, Ash species make up 7 percent of all Wisconsin forests (for example) and up to 90 percent of some forests. Eastern hemlock is the most common conifer in many northeastern forests. The loss of these species from the forest represents a loss of the contributions they made to the function of the ecosystem. Co-existing tree and plant species will gain in the void left by the affected species, but often providing different functions. Eastern hemlock, for example, is commonly replaced by black birch in the northeast—a slow-growing, shade-tolerant and deep shade producing evergreen tree, replaced by a fast-growing, open, deciduous tree. While short-term forest productivity was discussed above, long-term productivity of ash forests will depend on the species which fill the void; a slow-growing species (maples) would reduce forest productivity while a fast-growing species (box-elder) might increase productivity.

==== Limitations ====
The complete picture of long-term ecological effects from invasive pests is difficult to measure; and it is too early to determine the effects of the many new invasive pest introductions. Much of the research has focused of the biology of the pests—i.e. life cycle and host preferences—towards understanding how to contain their spread. Recent and rapid outbreaks such as emerald ash borer, however, have invigorated interest in understanding the ecological consequences of invasive pests and how to restore affected forests.

=== Survival and recovery ===
The American chestnut, virtually eliminated from eastern forests, survived in small isolated pockets. Some survivors have been cross-bred with the blight-resistant Chinese chestnut and introduced into National Forests in trial studies.

Parasitoid wasps have been approved for release by the USDA to combat the emerald ash borer. Pesticide applications are also used to protect ash trees against borer invasion. Blue ash is the one native ash species which shows some natural resistance to emerald ash borer.

Though the American elm remains susceptible to Dutch elm disease, it persists in forests—thus preserving genetic diversity—because it reaches maturity at a young age, produces seed that travels long distances through wind dispersal, can establish in disturbed areas and is tolerant of harsh conditions. Cultivars of American elm have been produced, and are available in the nursery trade, which are Dutch elm disease resistant, such as 'Valley Forge' and 'Princeton'.

== List of invasive insects and pathogens affecting tree species in North America ==
=== Insects ===
Note: Pathogens carried by insects are included under pathogens.

- Emerald ash borer is a beetle that infests native ash species and white fringetree
- Balsam woolly adelgid is an insect which devastated the high altitude spruce-fir forests in the mountains of North Carolina and Tennessee
- Hemlock woolly adelgid is an insect that infests eastern and Carolina hemlock
- Spongy moth is a defoliating insect that prefers oak, but feeds on hundreds of species
- Asian long-horned beetle infests primarily maple, poplar, willow and elm
- Sirex noctilio infests multiple pine species
- Southern pine beetle also infests several pine species; it is native to the Southeast, but is considered invasive in the Northeast
- Winter moth is a defoliating insect that infests many species including oaks, maples, and cherries

=== Pathogens ===
- Chestnut blight is a fungus that virtually eliminated American chestnut
- Sudden oak death is a pathogen that has been particularly deadly to tanoak but other oaks are vulnerable
- Dutch elm disease is a pathogen spread by beetles that devastated American elm, other native elms are more resistant
- Thousand cankers disease is a fungus carried by a beetle that infests black walnut
- Oak wilt is a fungal pathogen spread by sap beetles that infects oaks
- Beech bark disease is a fungus carried by a scale insect that infests American beech
- Beech leaf disease is a nematode that also infests American beech
- Butternut canker is a fungus that infects butternut (white walnut)
- Laurel wilt is a fungus carried on redbay ambrosia beetles that infects members of the laurel family
