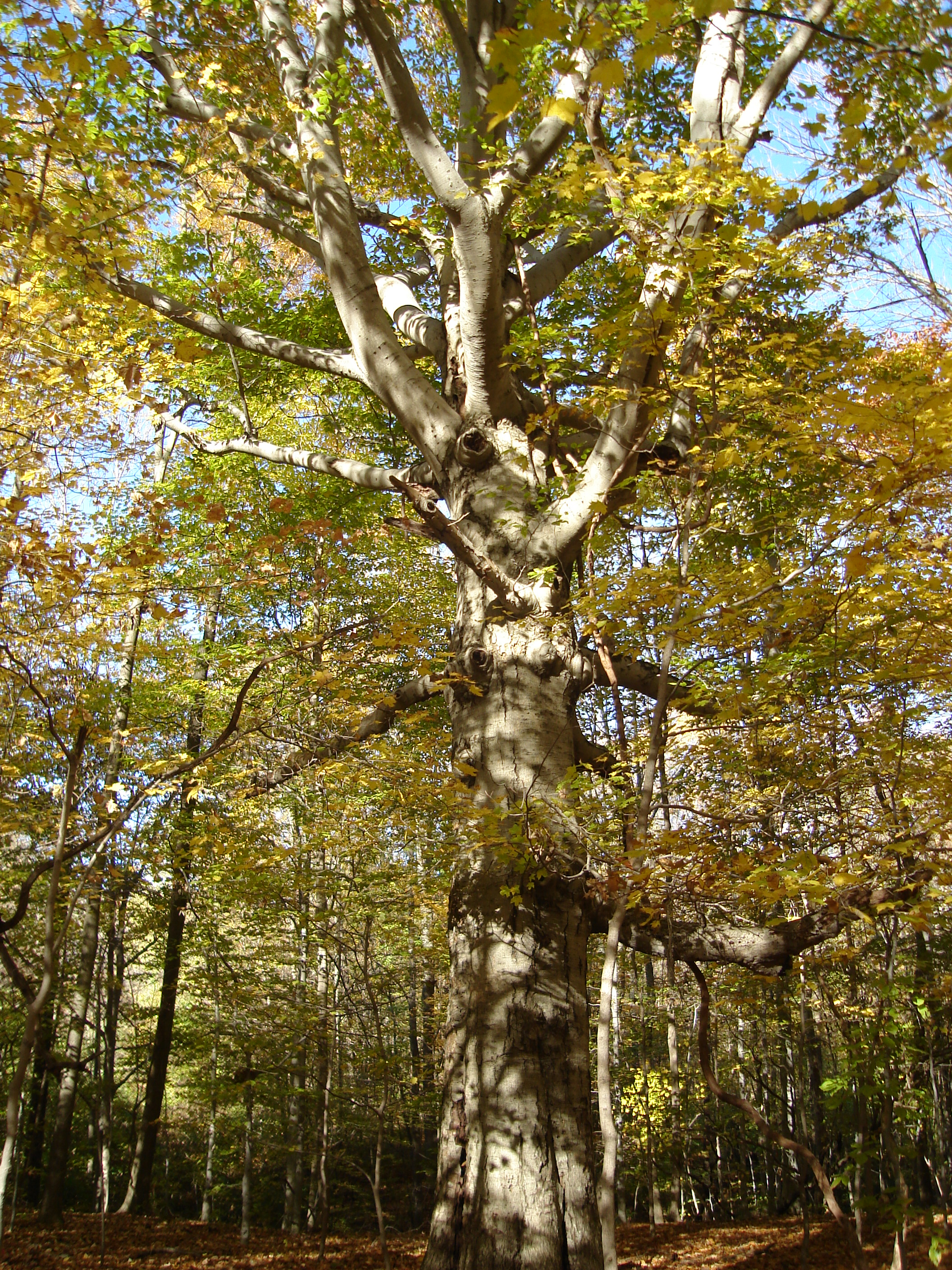

Conservation status
- Least Concern (IUCN 3.1)

- Secure (NatureServe)

Scientific classification
- Kingdom: Plantae
- Clade: Tracheophytes
- Clade: Angiosperms
- Clade: Eudicots
- Clade: Rosids
- Order: Fagales
- Family: Fagaceae
- Genus: Fagus
- Species: F. grandifolia

Binomial name
- Fagus grandifolia Ehrh.
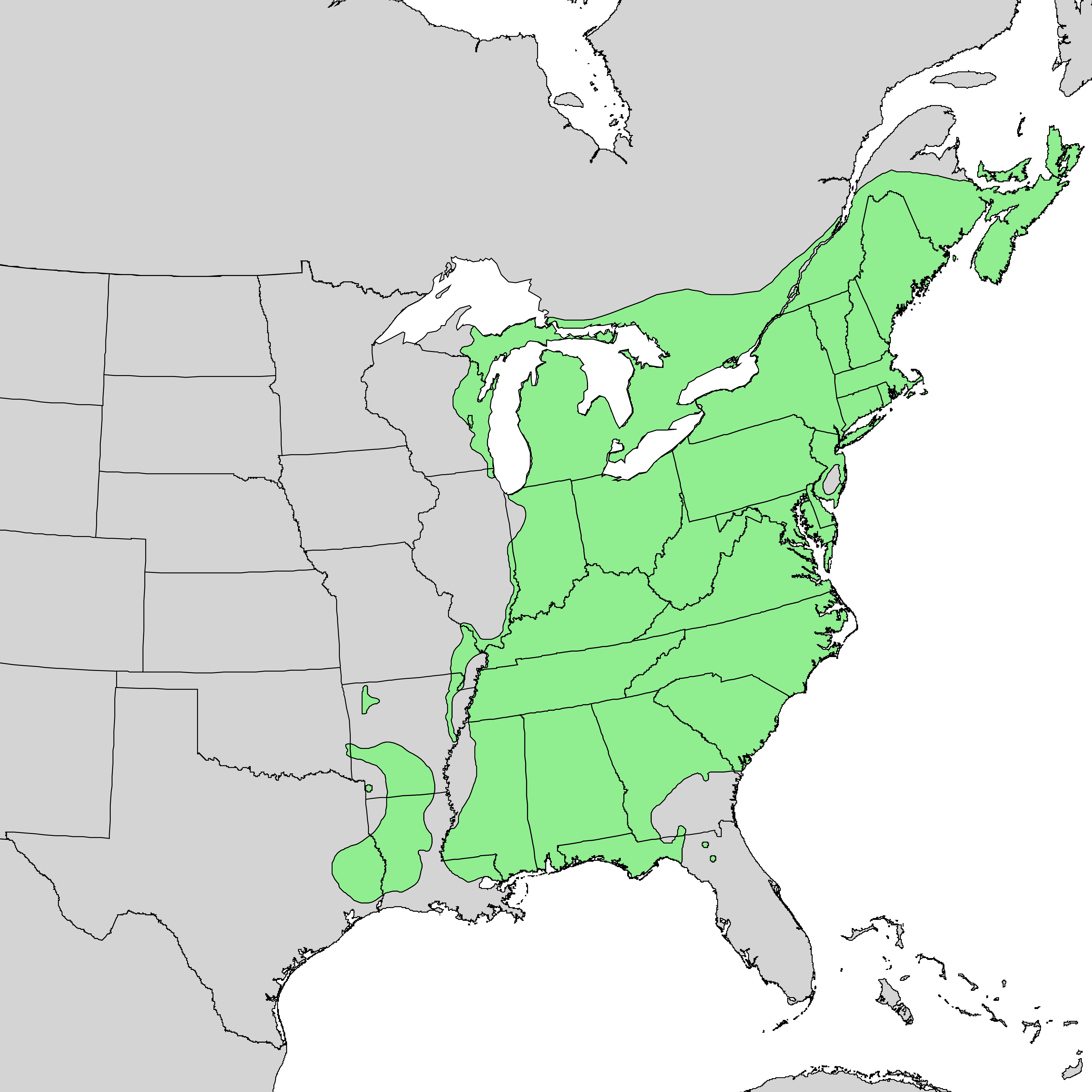
- It is naturally found from eastern Canada to southeastern United States

Synonyms
- Fagus grandifolia var. typica Rehder

= Fagus grandifolia =

American beech

Species of tree

Fagus grandifolia, the American beech or North American beech, is a species of tree growing to 16–35 meters (52–115 feet) tall. It is one of two beech species native to North America, the other occurring in Mexico. It flourished over most of the continent prior to the last ice age, but is now limited to the east. The tree is shade tolerant and typically found in forests when the site is at its climax.

The nuts are eaten by animals and humans. The leaves and inner bark can be prepared as well.

== Description ==
Fagus grandifolia is a large deciduous tree growing to 16–35 meters (52–115 feet) tall, with smooth, silver-gray bark. The winter twigs are distinctive among North American trees, being long and slender (15–20 mm or 5/8–3/4 in by 2–3 mm or 3/32–1/8 in) with two rows of overlapping scales on the buds. Beech buds are distinctly thin and long, resembling cigars; this characteristic makes beech trees relatively easy to identify.

The leaves are dark green, yellow below, simple and sparsely toothed with small teeth that terminate each vein, and 6–12 centimeters (2 1/4–4 3/4 inches) long (rarely 15 cm or 6 in), with a short petiole.

The tree is monoecious, with flowers of both sexes on the same tree. The fruit is a small, sharply angled nut, borne in pairs in a soft-spined, four-lobed husk. It has two means of reproduction: one is through the usual dispersal of seedlings, and the other is through root sprouts, which grow into new trees.

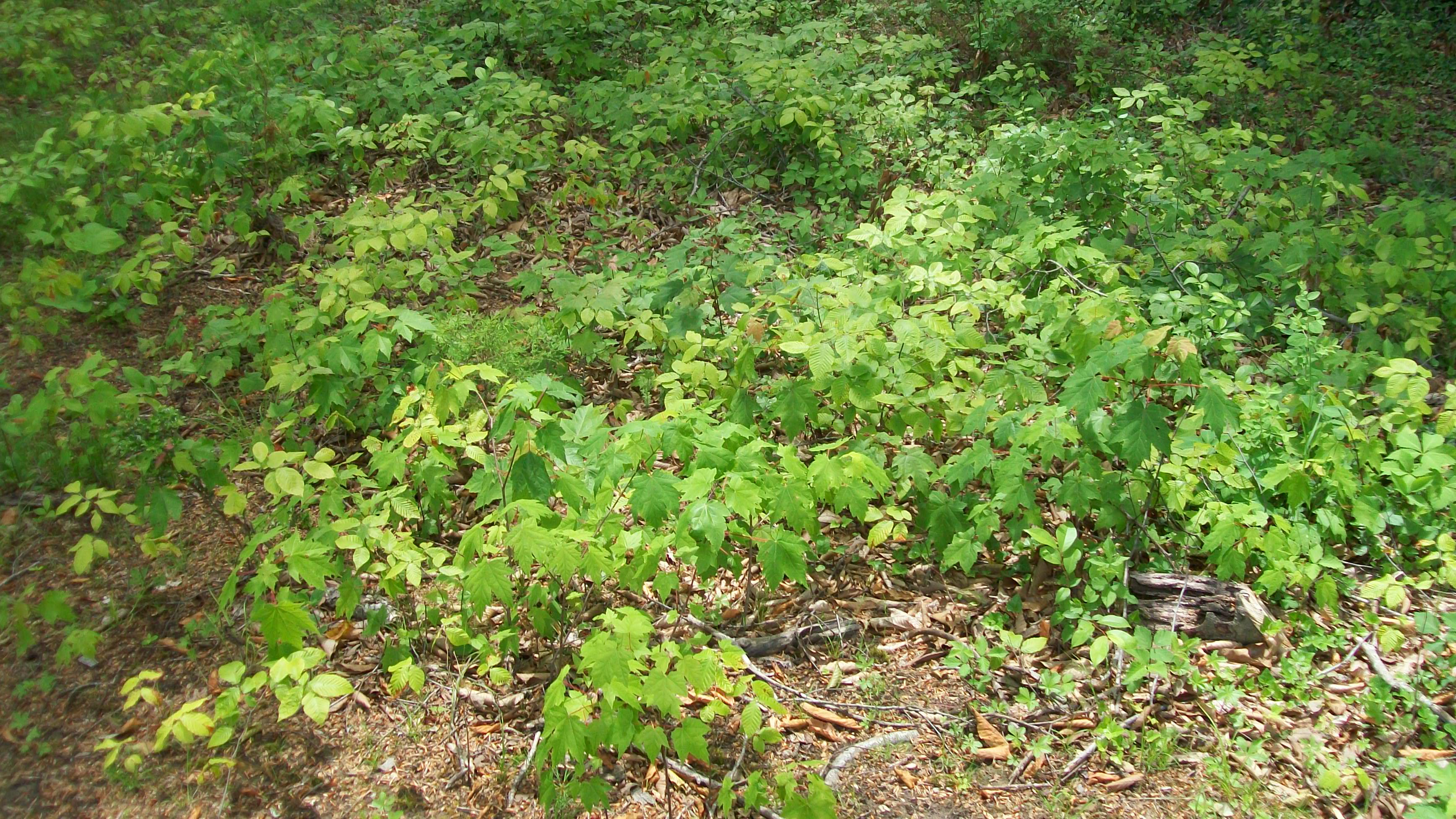
Beech and maple seedlings in Tennessee

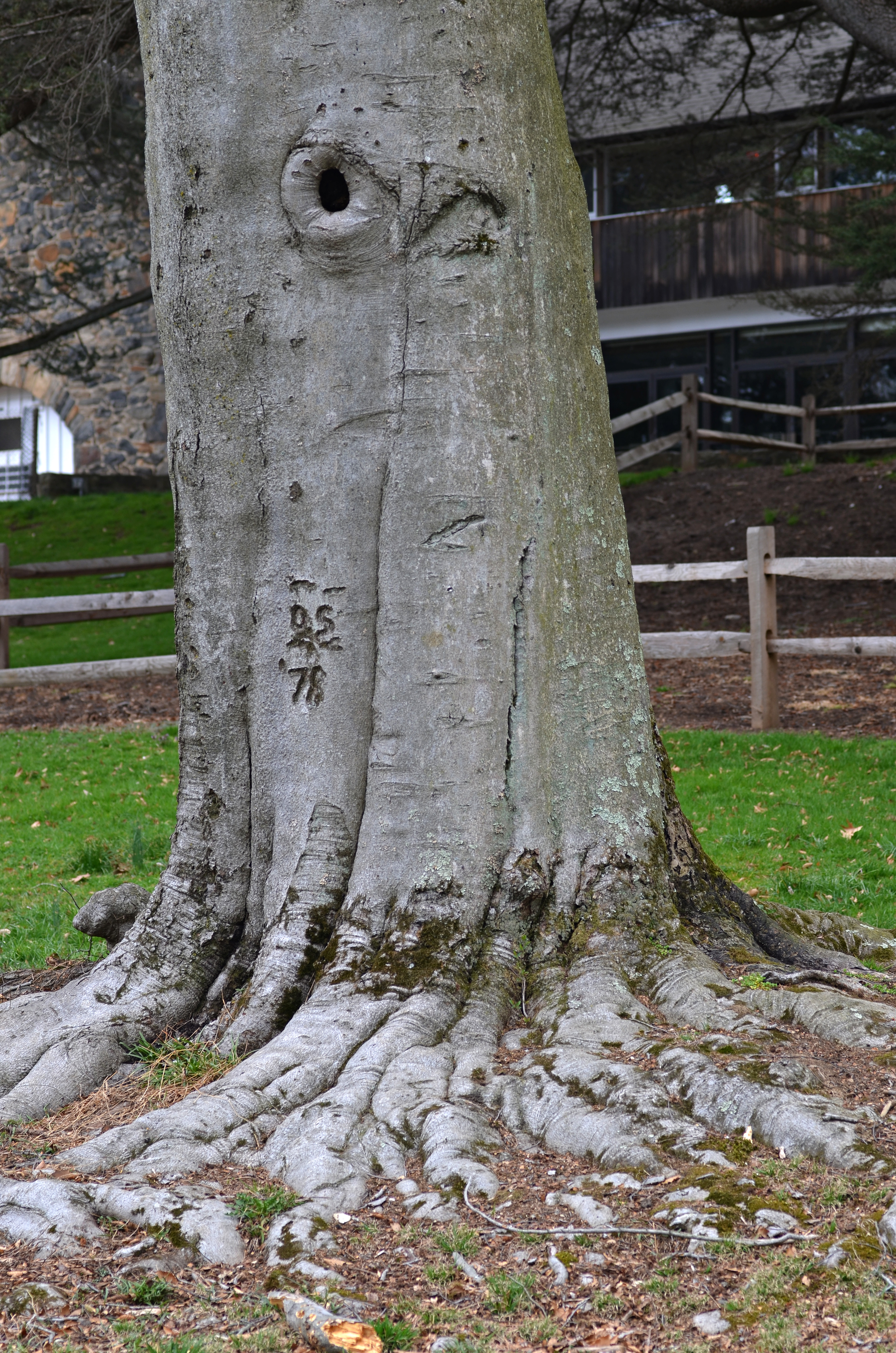
Trunk with carving

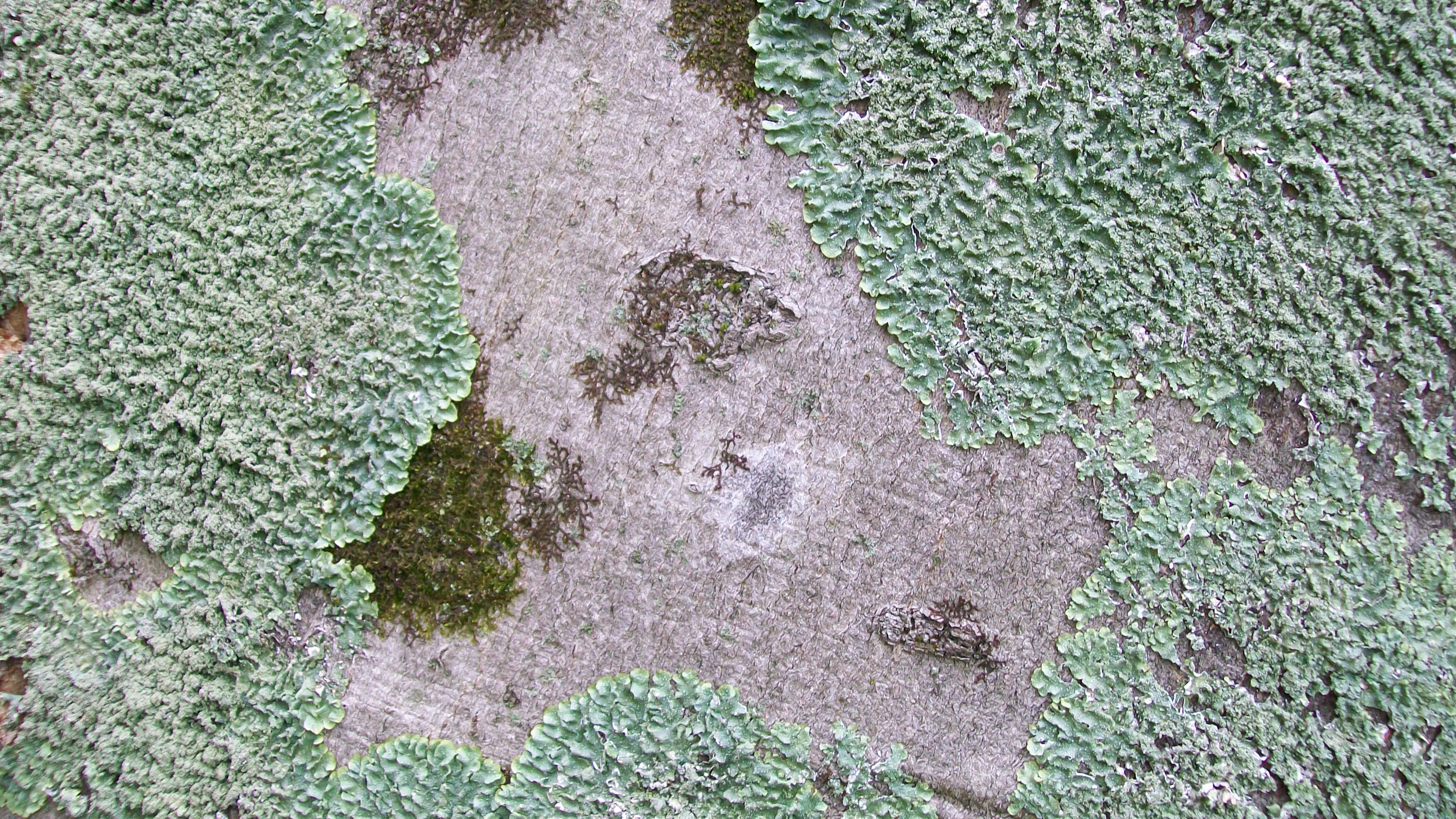
Bark with lichen

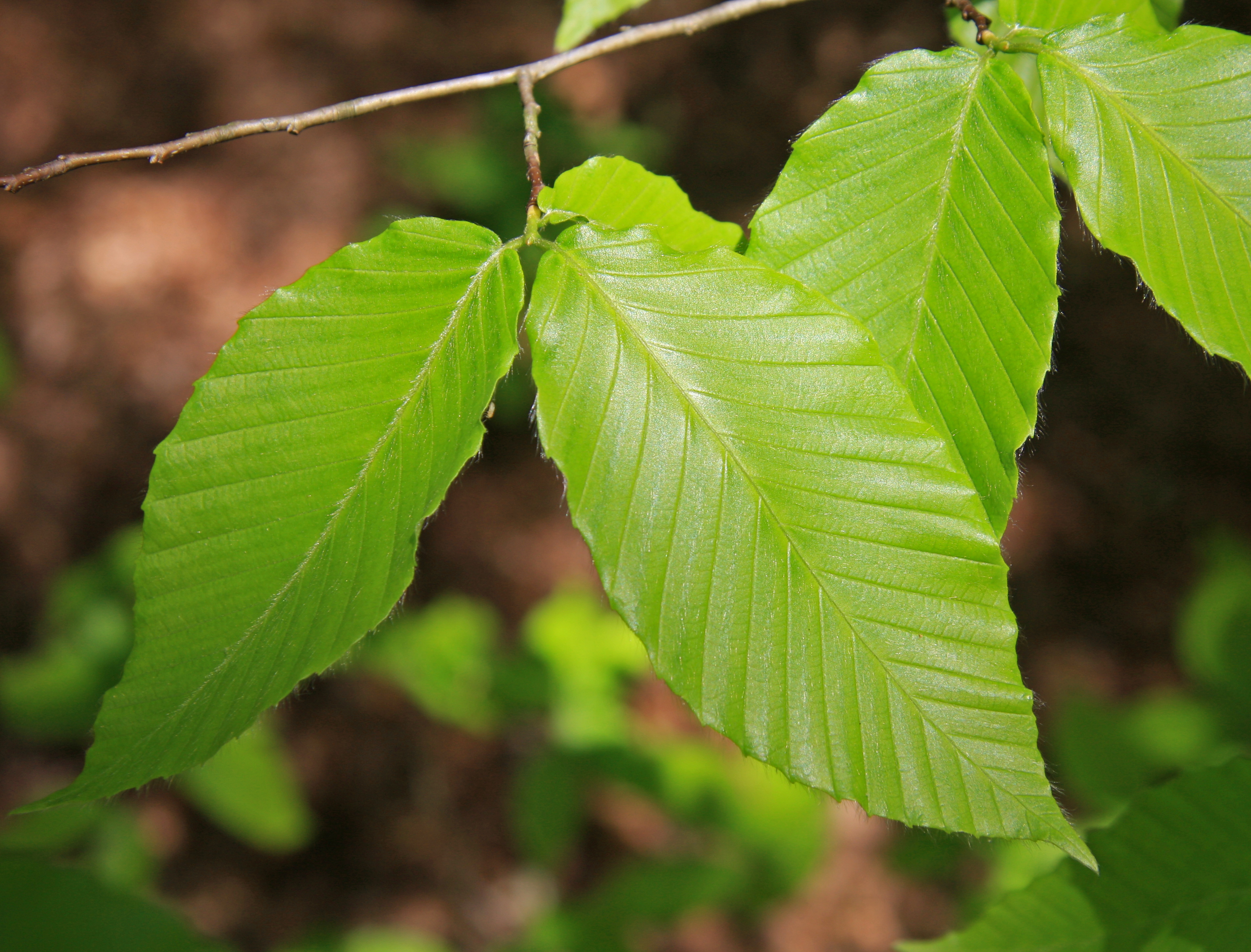
Spring leaves

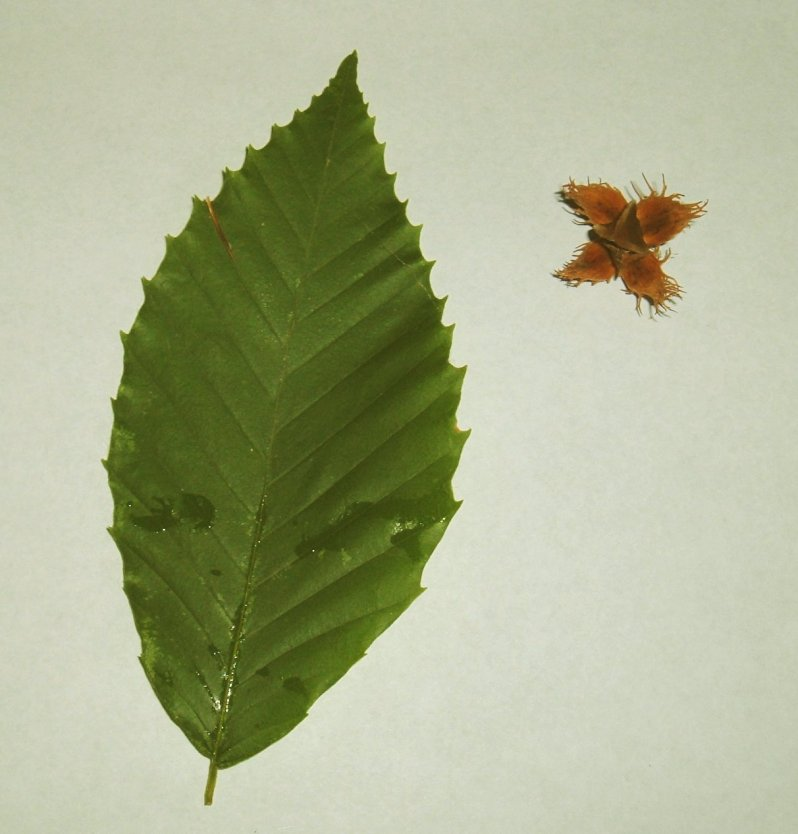
Beech leaf and nut

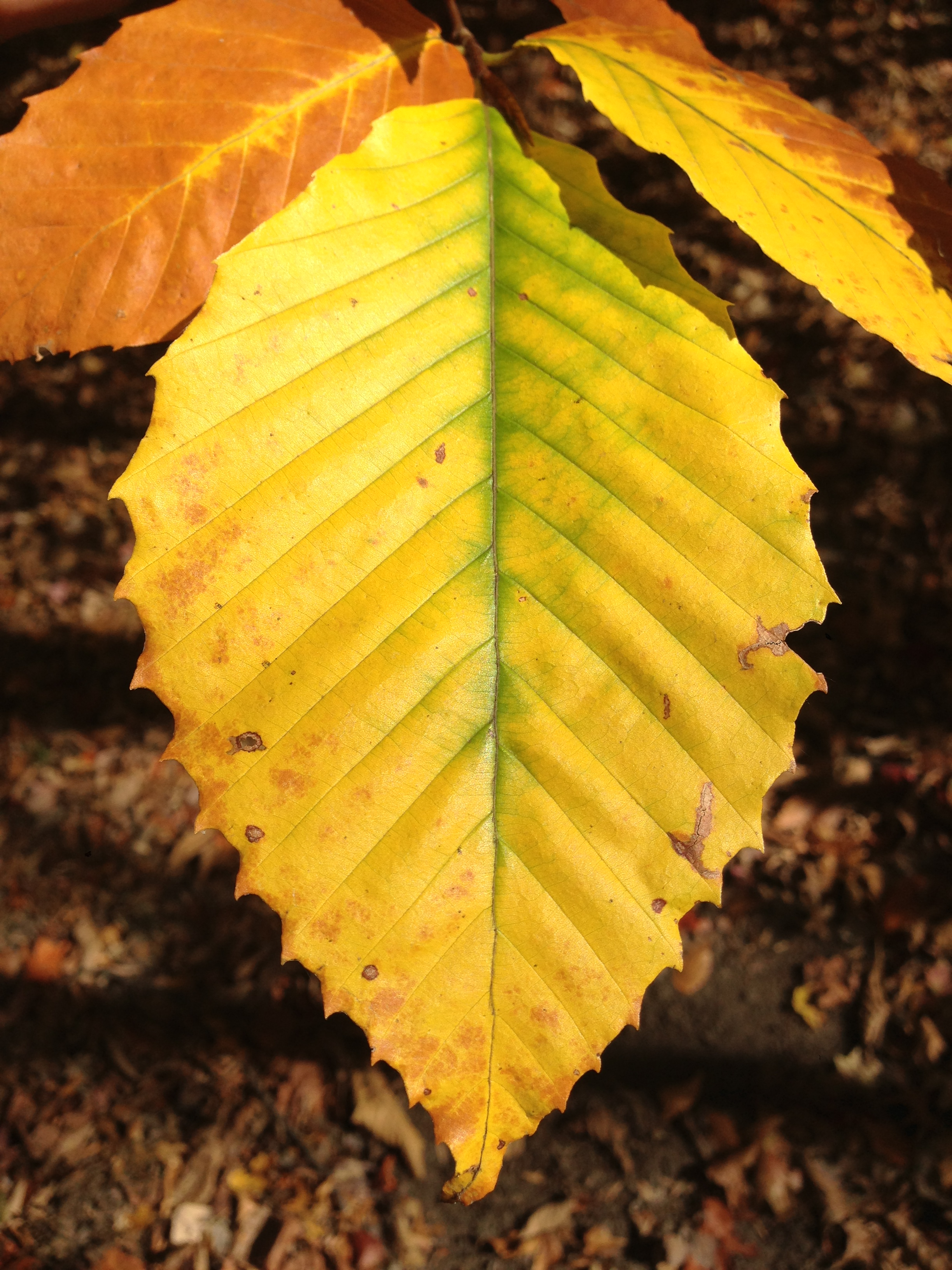
Autumn foliage

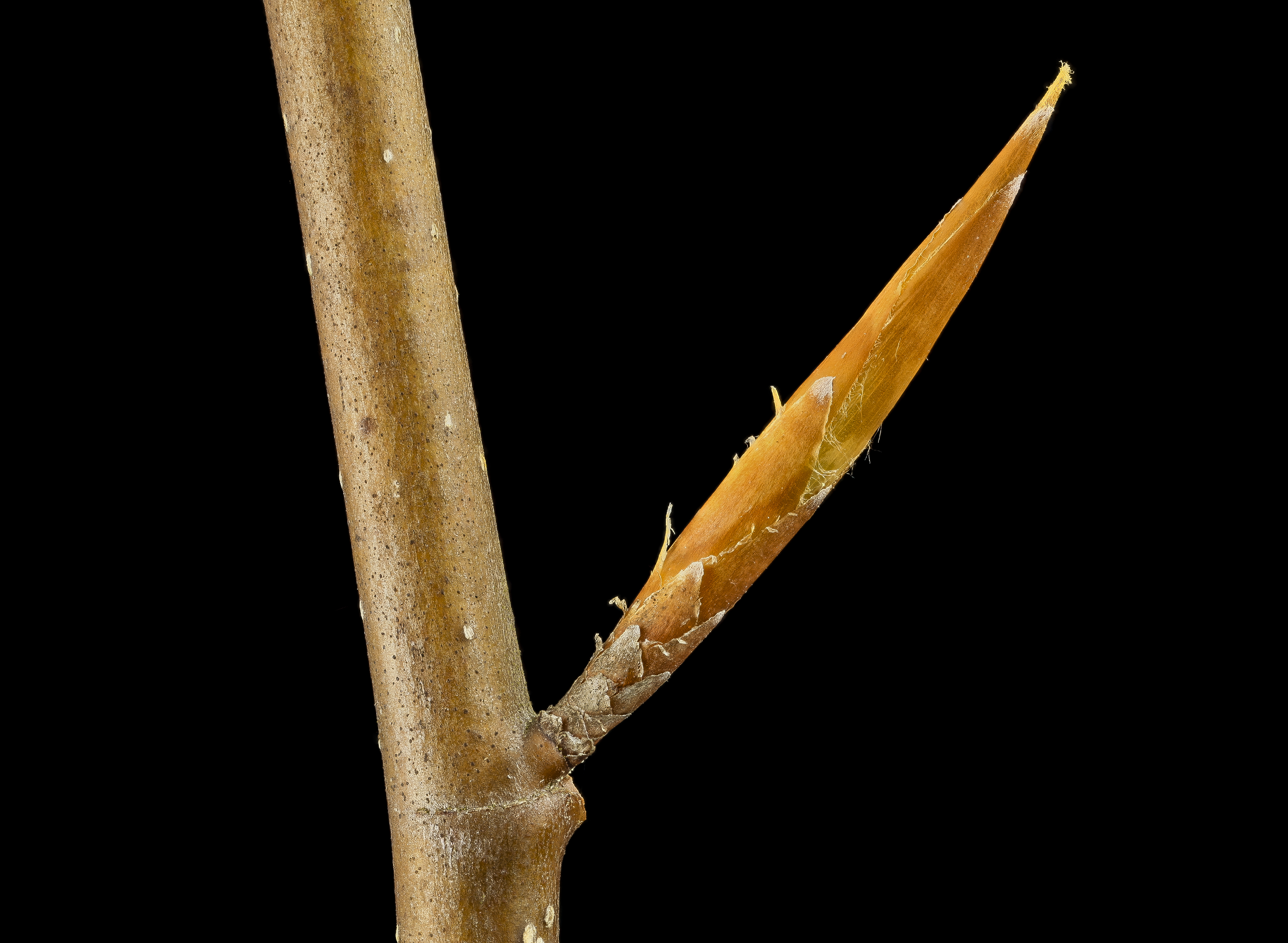
The long and thin winter bud

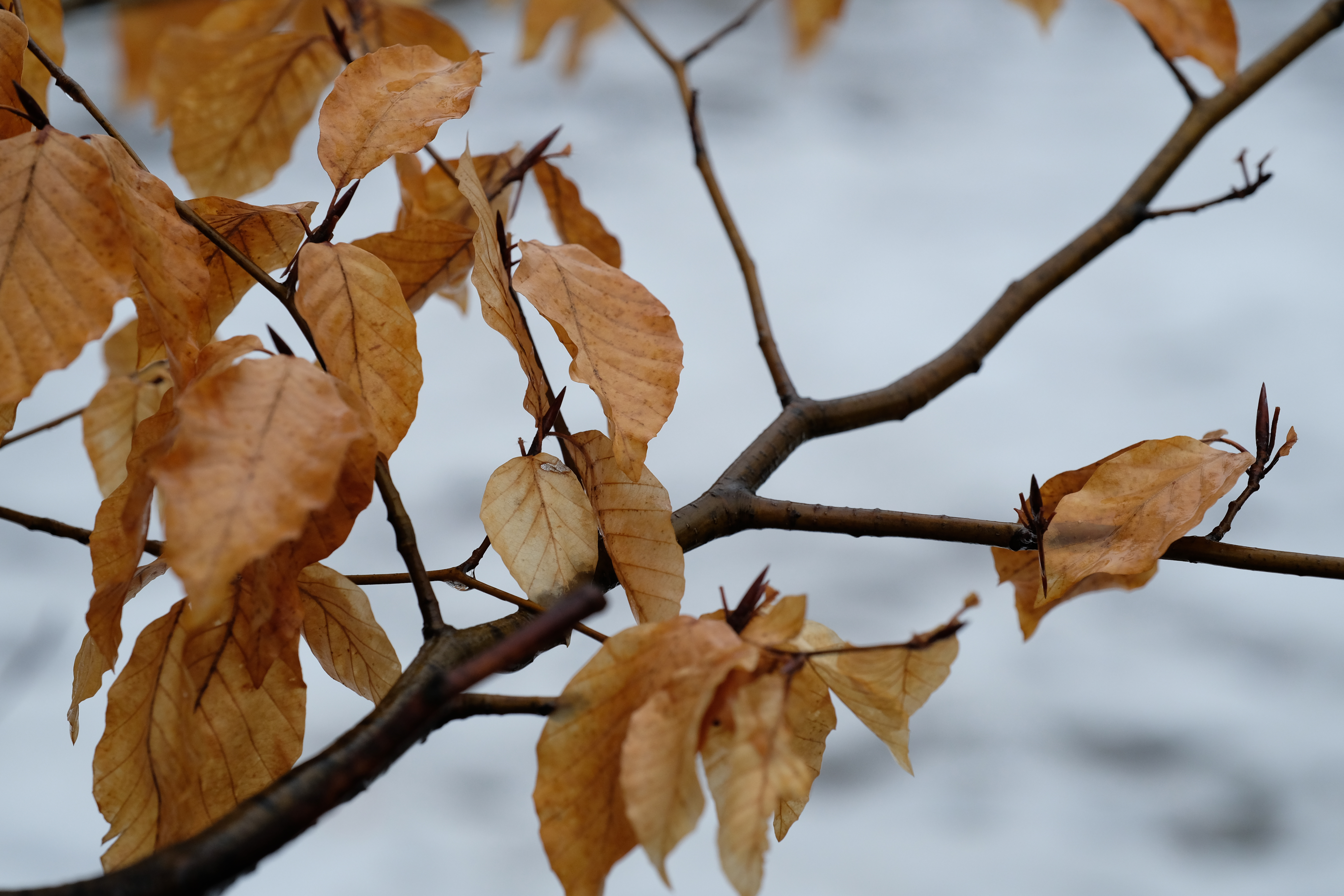
Marcescent leaves in late winter

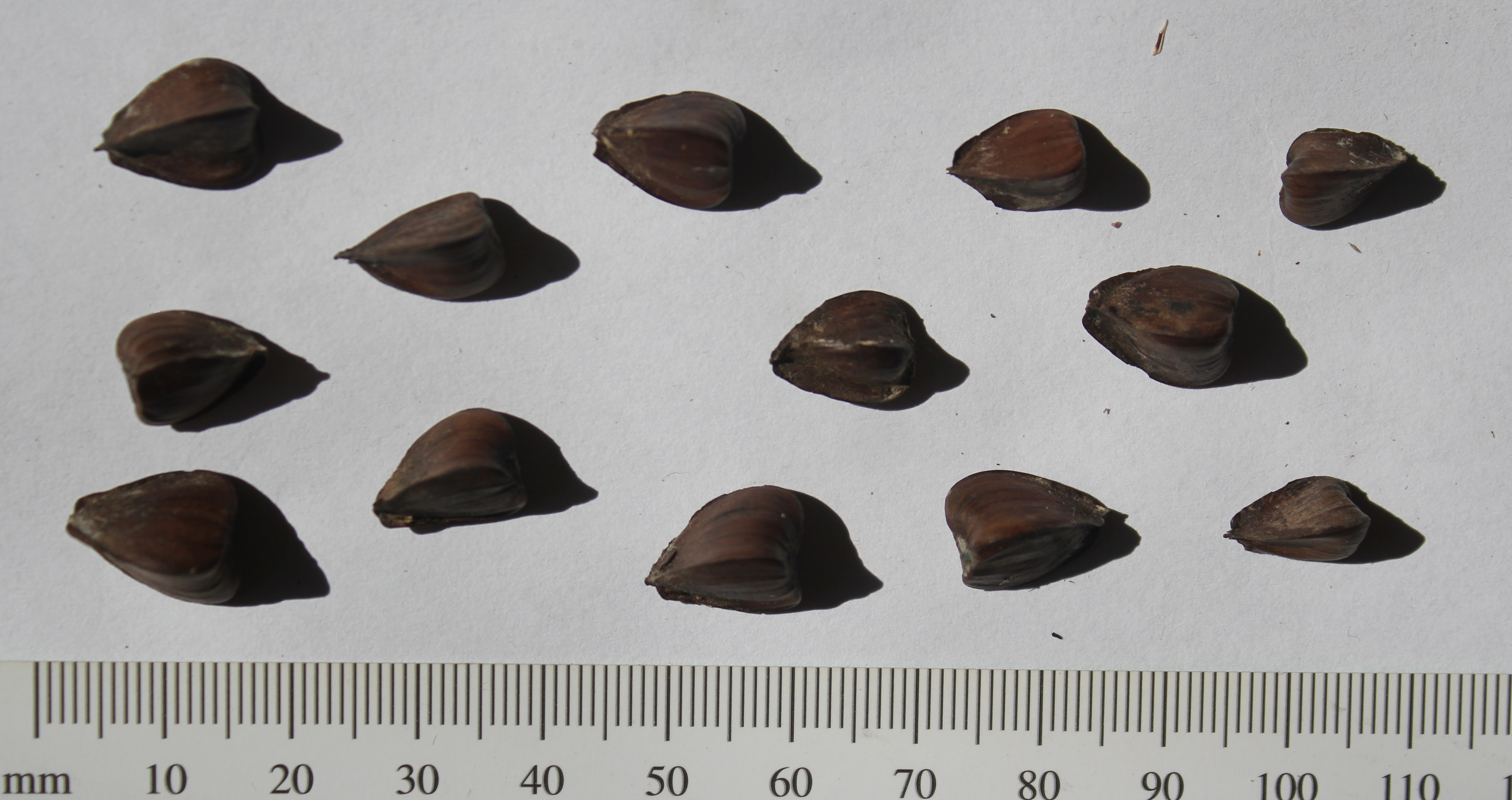
Beechnuts

== Taxonomy ==
Trees in the southern half of the range are sometimes distinguished as a variety, F. grandifolia var. caroliniana, but this is not considered distinct by either the Flora of North America or the Plants of the World Online database. The Mexican beech (Fagus mexicana), native to the mountains of eastern Mexico, is closely related, and was often treated as a subspecies of American beech, but is now classified as a distinct species, following recent research which has shown it differs in genetics, lacking some ancient introgression with Eurasian Fagus species which is present in F. grandifolia,

F. grandifolia is believed to have spanned the width of the North American continent all the way to the Pacific coast before the last ice age.

=== Etymology ===
The genus name Fagus is Latin for "beech", and the specific epithet grandifolia comes from grandis "large" and folium "leaf", in reference to the American beech's larger leaves when compared to the European beech.

== Distribution and habitat ==
The American beech can be found in its extant native region of eastern North America, from Nova Scotia west to southern Ontario in southeastern Canada, west to Wisconsin and south to eastern Texas and northern Florida in the United States. Mature specimens are rare in lowland areas as early settlers quickly discovered that the presence of the tree indicated good farmland.

The American beech is a shade-tolerant species, commonly found in forests in the final stage of succession. Few trees in its natural range other than sugar maple match it for shade tolerance. Ecological succession is essentially the process of forests changing their composition through time; it is a pattern of events often observed on disturbed sites. Although sometimes found in pure stands, it is more often associated with sugar maple (forming the beech–maple climax community), yellow birch, and eastern hemlock, typically on moist, well-drained slopes and rich bottomlands. Near its southern limit, it often shares canopy dominance with southern magnolia. Although it has a reputation for slow growth (sometimes only 13 feet in 20 years), rich soil and ample moisture will greatly speed the process up. American beech favors a well-watered, but also well-drained spot and is intolerant of urban pollution, salt, and soil compaction. It also casts heavy shade and is an extremely thirsty tree with high moisture requirements compared to oaks, so it has a dense, shallow root system.

== Ecology ==
The mast (crop of nuts) from American beech provides food for numerous species of animals. Among vertebrates alone, these include various birds including ruffed grouse and wild turkeys, raccoons, foxes, white-tailed deer, rabbits, squirrels, opossums, pheasants, black bears, and porcupines. Beech nuts were one of the primary foods of the now-extinct passenger pigeon; the clearing of beech and oak forests is pointed to as one of the major factors that may have contributed to the bird's extinction. Some Lepidoptera caterpillars feed on beeches. Deer occasionally browse on beech foliage, but it is not a preferred food.

=== Diseases and pests ===
Beech bark disease has become a major killer of beech trees in the Northeastern U.S. This disease occurs when the European beech scale insect, Cryptococcus fagisuga, attacks the bark, creating a wound that is then infected by Neonectria ditissima or Neonectria faginata, two species of fungi. This causes a canker to develop and the tree is eventually killed.

Beech leaf disease is caused by the nematode Litylenchus crenatae mccannii. It was discovered in Ohio in 2012 and identified as far south as Virginia in 2022. Beech leaf disease causes severe damage to the American beech and also to the related European beech.

The beech leaf-miner weevil, a species native to Europe, has been identified in North America as a cause of defoliation of American beech trees. American beech trees have small gaps and crevices at the base of their trunks in which the pest overwinter before eventually making their way to the buds of the trees and finally laying eggs on the underside of the leaves. Once hatched, the larvae mine the leaves, causing destruction to the foliage.

Beech blight aphids colonize branches of the tree, but without serious harm to otherwise healthy trees. Below these colonies, deposits of sooty mold develop caused by the fungus Scorias spongiosa growing saprophytically on the honeydew the insects exude. This is also harmless to the trees.

Despite their high moisture needs, beeches succumb to flooding easily and their thin bark invites damage from animals, fire, and human activities. Late spring frosts can cause complete defoliation of the tree, although they typically recover by using reserve pools of sugar. The trunks of mature beeches often rot and develop cavities that are used by wildlife for habitation.

== Uses ==
American beech is an important tree in forestry. The wood is hard and difficult to cut or split, although at 43 pounds per cubic foot (0.69 g/cm^{3}) it is not exceptionally heavy, and it also rots relatively easily. It is used for a wide variety of purposes, most notably bentwood furniture as beech wood easily bends when steamed. It also makes high quality, long-burning firewood.

It is sometimes planted as an ornamental tree, but even within its native area, it is planted much less often than the European beech. Although American beech can handle hotter climates, its European cousin is faster-growing and more pollution-tolerant, in addition to being easier to propagate.

American beech does not produce significant quantities of nuts until the tree is about 40 years old. Large crops are produced by 60 years. The oldest documented tree is 246 years old. The fruit is a triangle-shaped shell containing 2–3 nuts inside, but many of them do not fill in, especially on solitary trees. Beech nuts are sweet and nutritious, can be eaten raw by wildlife and humans, or can be cooked. They can also be roasted and ground into a coffee substitute.

The leaves are edible when cooked. The inner bark can be dried and pulverized into bread flour as an emergency food.

== In culture ==
Like European beech bark, the American beech bark is smooth and uniform, making it an attraction for people to carve names, dates, decorative symbols such as love hearts or gang identifiers, and other material into its surface. One such beech tree in Louisville, Kentucky, in what is now the southern part of Iroquois Park, bore the legend "D. Boone kill a Bar 1803." The beech finally fell over in 1916 during a storm; its age was estimated at around 325 years. Its trunk is now on display at the Filson Historical Society.

In John Steinbeck's novel East of Eden, a character returns from the Civil War with a wooden leg he carved from beechwood.

Numerous place names in North America are named Beechwood.
