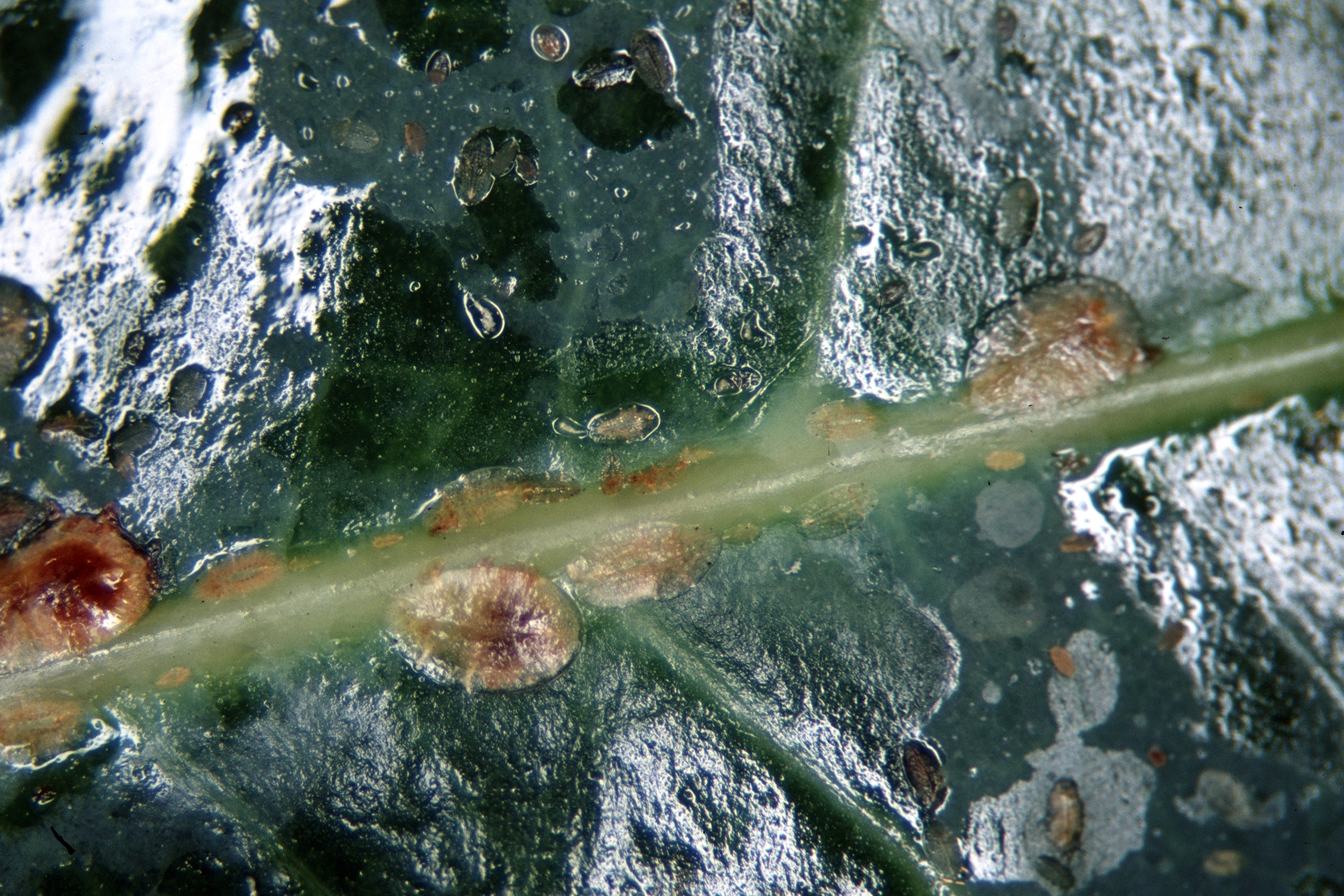
- Coccus hesperidum

Scientific classification
- Kingdom: Animalia
- Phylum: Arthropoda
- Class: Insecta
- Order: Hemiptera
- Suborder: Sternorrhyncha
- Family: Coccidae
- Genus: Coccus; Linnaeus, 1758

= Coccus (insect) =

Genus of true bugs

Coccus, from Ancient Greek κόκκος (kókkos), meaning "sphere", is a genus of scale insects in the family Coccidae. Several species, such as Coccus viridis, a major pest of coffee, are major agricultural pests. The type species is Coccus hesperidum Linnaeus.

== Species ==
- Coccus acaciae (Newstead, 1917)
- Coccus bromeliae Bouché, 1833
- Coccus capparidis (Green, 1904)
- Coccus celatus De Lotto, 1960
- Coccus gymnospori (Green, 1908)
- Coccus hesperidum Linnaeus, 1758, the brown soft scale
- Coccus longulus (Douglas, 1887)
- Coccus penangensis Morrison, 1921
- Coccus pseudelongatus (Brain, 1920)
- Coccus pseudohesperidum (Cockerell, 1895)
- Coccus pseudomagnoliarum (Kuwana, 1914)
- Coccus formicarii (Green, 1896)
- Coccus viridis (Green, 1889)

== Former species ==
- Coccus aceris Fabricius, 1794 synonym for Eulecanium tiliae (Linnaeus, 1758)
- Coccus alni Modeer, 1778 synonym for Eulecanium tiliae (Linnaeus, 1758)
- Coccus arens Hodgson, 1968 synonym for Coccus capparidis (Green, 1904)
- Coccus arundinariae Sanders, 1906 synonym for Maacoccus arundinariae (Green, 1904)
- Coccus bauhini Targioni Tozzetti, 1867 synonym for Kermes ilicis (Linnaeus, 1758)
- Coccus bicruciatus Sanders, 1906 synonym for Maacoccus bicruciatus (Green, 1904)
- Coccus cacti Cockerell, 1893 synonym for Dactylopius coccus Costa, 1829
- Coccus celticum Takahashi, 1955 synonym for Coccus longulus (Douglas, 1887)
- Coccus celtium Sasscer, 1911 synonym for Coccus longulus (Douglas, 1887)
- Coccus coffeae Kirkaldy, 1902 synonym for Saissetia coffeae (Walker, 1852)
- Coccus cypraeola Dalman, 1826 synonym for Eulecanium tiliae (Linnaeus, 1758)
- Coccus deltae Corseuil & Barbosa, 1971 synonym for Parthenolecanium perlatum (Cockerell, 1898)
- Coccus diversipes Cockerell, 1905 synonym for Kilifia diversipes (Cockerell, 1905)
- Coccus elongatus Sanders, 1909 synonym for Coccus longulus (Douglas, 1887)
- Coccus fagi Baerensprung, 1849 ambiguous synonym for Cryptococcus fagisuga Lindinger, 1936
- Coccus fagi Walker, 1852 ambiguous synonym for Cryptococcus fagisuga Lindinger, 1936
- Coccus ficus Fernald, 1903 synonym for Coccus longulus (Douglas, 1887)
- Coccus frontalis Sanders, 1906 synonym for Coccus longulus (Douglas, 1887)
- Coccus fuscus Gmelin, 1790 synonym for Eulecanium tiliae (Linnaeus, 1758)
- Coccus iceryi Tao et al., 1983 synonym for Pulvinaria iceryi (Signoret, 1869)
- Coccus ilicis Linnaeus, 1758 synonym for Kermes ilicis (Linnaeus, 1758)
- Coccus impar Bodkin, 1917 synonym for Mesolecanium impar (Cockerell, 1898)
- Coccus lacca Kerr, 1782 synonym for Kerria lacca (Kerr, 1782)
- Coccus mali Schrank, 1781 synonym for Eulecanium tiliae (Linnaeus, 1758)
- Coccus marsupialis Sanders, 1906 synonym for Marsipococcus marsupialis (Green, 1904)
- Coccus namunakuli Ali, 1971 synonym for Parlatoria namunakuli (Green, 1922)
- Coccus perlatus Fernald, 1903 synonym for Parthenolecanium perlatum (Cockerell, 1898)
- Coccus polonicus Linnaeus, 1758 synonym for Porphyrophora polonica (Linnaeus, 1758)
- Coccus pyri Schrank, 1801 synonym for Eulecanium tiliae (Linnaeus, 1758)
- Coccus radicum Beckmann, 1790 synonym for Porphyrophora polonica (Linnaeus, 1758)
- Coccus rubi Schrank, 1801 synonym for Eulecanium tiliae (Linnaeus, 1758)
- Coccus salicum Fabricius, 1781 synonym for Eulecanium tiliae (Linnaeus, 1758)
- Coccus tiliae Linnaeus, 1758 synonym for Eulecanium tiliae (Linnaeus, 1758)
- Coccus xylostei Schrank, 1801 synonym for Eulecanium tiliae (Linnaeus, 1758)
