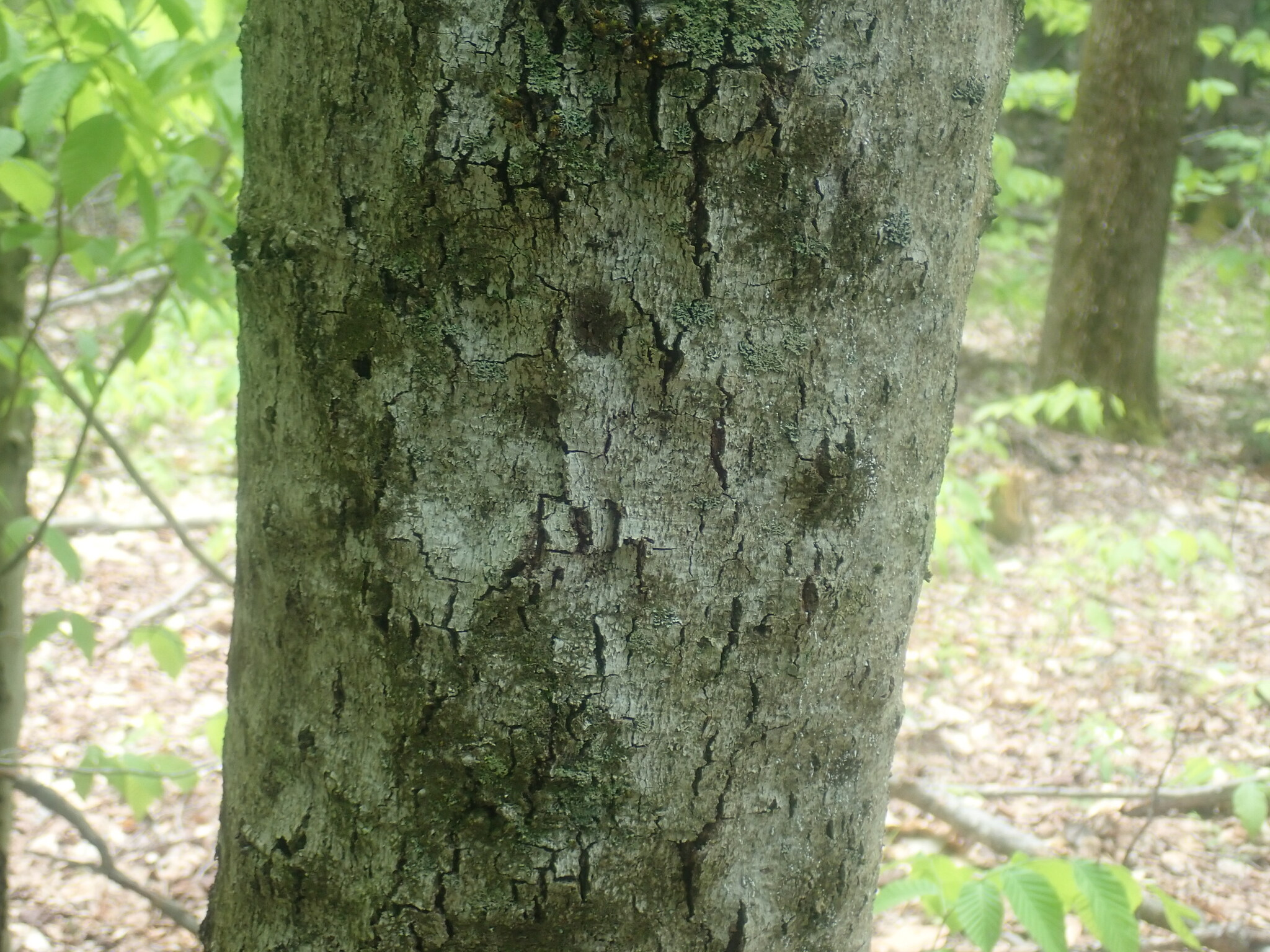
- Neonectria faginata

Scientific classification
- Kingdom: Fungi
- Division: Ascomycota
- Class: Sordariomycetes
- Order: Hypocreales
- Family: Nectriaceae
- Genus: Neonectria
- Species: N. faginata

Binomial name
- Neonectria faginata (M.L.Lohman, A.M.J.Watson & Ayers) Castlebury & Rossman

= Neonectria faginata =

Species of fungus

Neonectria faginata is a species of fungus that affects Beech trees in North America. Neonectria faginata, along with Neonectria ditissima, are the cause of beech bark disease in trees that have already been affected by beech scale Cryptococcus fagisuga.
