= Cryptococcus (disambiguation) =

Cryptococcus may refer to:

- Cryptococcus (fungus), a fungus genus in the family Cryptococcaceae
- Cryptococcus (insect), an insect genus in the family Eriococcidae
