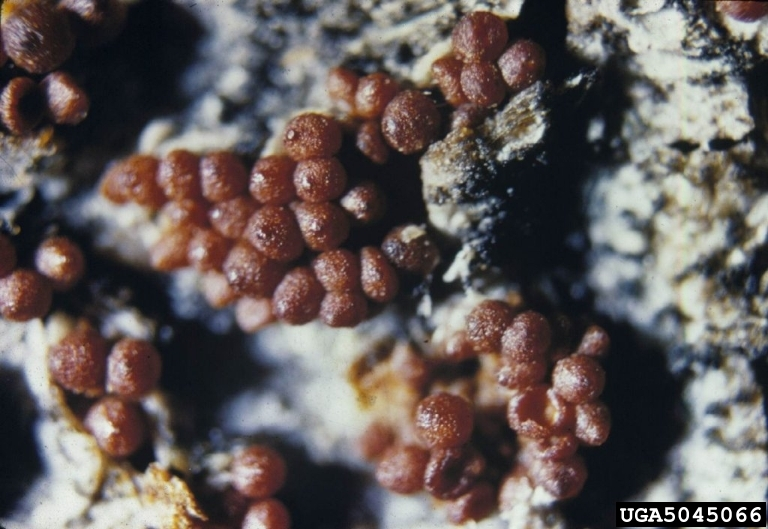
- Nectria coccinea fruiting bodies

Scientific classification
- Kingdom: Fungi
- Division: Ascomycota
- Class: Sordariomycetes
- Order: Hypocreales
- Family: Nectriaceae
- Genus: Nectria
- Species: N. coccinea

Binomial name
- Nectria coccinea Desm.

= Nectria coccinea =

Species of fungus

Nectria coccinea is a fungal plant pathogen. The variant Nectria coccinea var. faginata causes beech bark disease, and can infect the tree via the feeding holes made by the beech scale insect Cryptococcus fagisuga.
