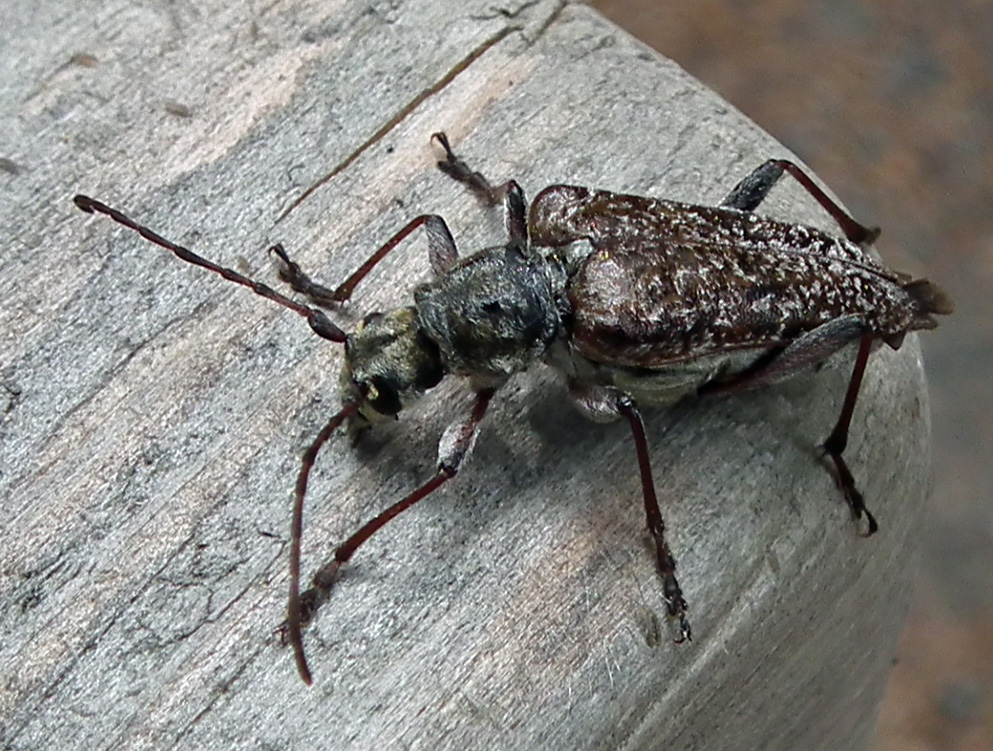

Scientific classification
- Domain: Eukaryota
- Kingdom: Animalia
- Phylum: Arthropoda
- Class: Insecta
- Order: Coleoptera
- Suborder: Polyphaga
- Infraorder: Cucujiformia
- Family: Cerambycidae
- Subfamily: Lepturinae
- Tribe: Oxymirini
- Genus: Anthophylax
- Species: A. attenuatus

Binomial name
- Anthophylax attenuatus (Haldeman, 1847)

Synonyms
- Anthophilax antennatus Kirk & Knull, 1926; Anthophilax attenuata (Haldeman) Slosson, 1893; Anthophilax attenuatus (Haldeman) Provancher, 1877; Argaleus attenuatus (Haldeman) LeConte, 1850; Leptura attenuata (Haldeman) Horn, 1868; Pachyta attenuata Haldeman, 1847; Anthophilax alternatus (Haldeman) Nicolay, 1917 (misspelling)

= Anthophylax attenuatus =

Species of beetle

Anthophylax attenuatus is the species of the Lepturinae subfamily in long-horned beetle family. This beetle is distributed in Canada, and USA. Adult beetle feeds on sugar maple, American beech, and on hophornbeam.
