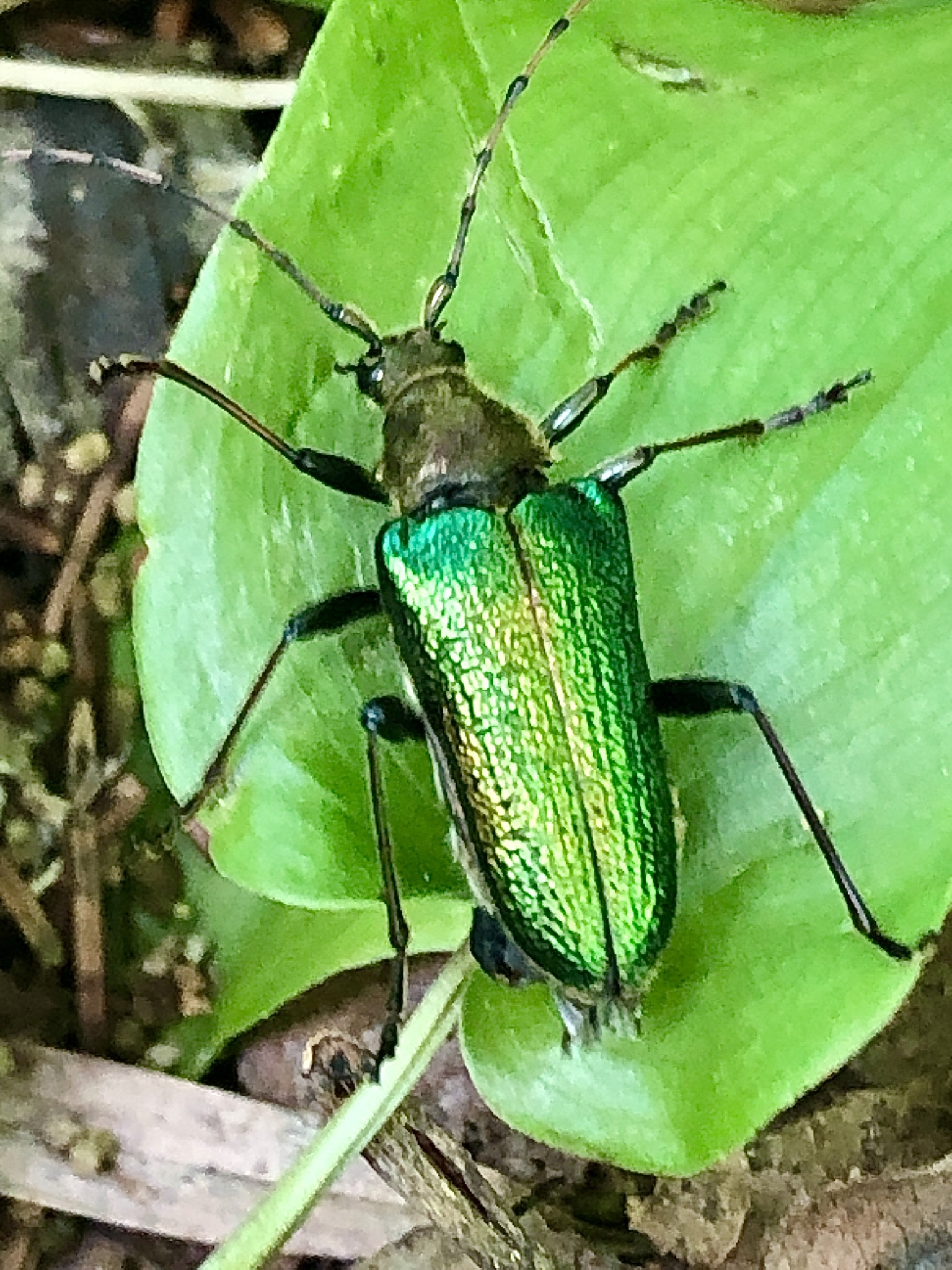

Scientific classification
- Kingdom: Animalia
- Phylum: Arthropoda
- Clade: Pancrustacea
- Class: Insecta
- Order: Coleoptera
- Suborder: Polyphaga
- Infraorder: Cucujiformia
- Family: Cerambycidae
- Subfamily: Lepturinae
- Tribe: Oxymirini
- Genus: Anthophylax
- Species: A. viridis

Binomial name
- Anthophylax viridis LeConte, 1850

Synonyms
- Anthophilax viridis LeConte in Agazziz, 1850; Anthophilax viridis viridipennis Casey, 1918

= Anthophylax viridis =

Species of beetle

Anthophylax viridis is a species of long-horned beetle in the subfamily Lepturinae. It is found in Canada and the United States.
