= Anthophylax cyaneus =

Scientific classification
- Kingdom: Animalia
- Phylum: Arthropoda
- Clade: Pancrustacea
- Class: Insecta
- Order: Coleoptera
- Suborder: Polyphaga
- Infraorder: Cucujiformia
- Family: Cerambycidae
- Subfamily: Lepturinae
- Tribe: Oxymirini
- Genus: Anthophylax
- Species: A. cyaneus

Binomial name
- Anthophylax cyaneus (Haldeman, 1848)

Synonyms
- Anthophilax cyaneus Casey, 1918; Anthophilax malachiticus Nicolay, 1917; Anthophilax malachitus Doane et al., 1936; Anthophylax cyanea White, 1985; Anthophylax malachiticus Fletcher, 1902; Leptura malachiticus Emmons, 1854; Pachyta malachiticus Haldeman, 1847; Pachyta malachiticus cyaneus Haldeman, 1847

Species of beetle

Anthophylax cyaneus is a species of beetle in the family Cerambycidae. It is found in Canada and United States of America.
