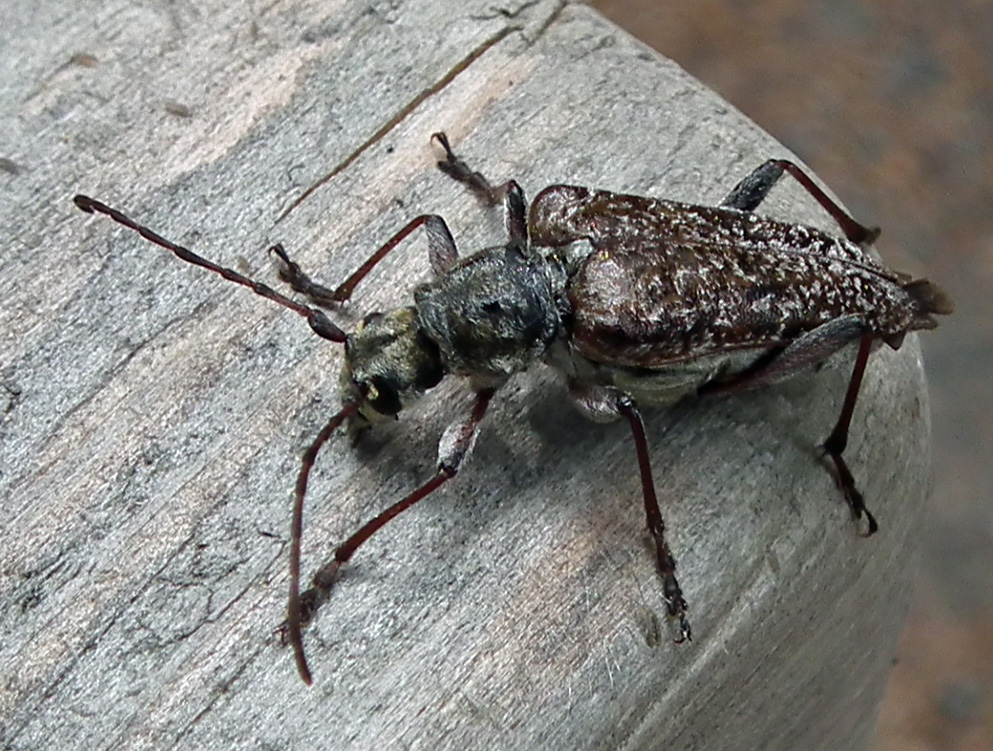
- Anthophylax attenuatus

Scientific classification
- Kingdom: Animalia
- Phylum: Arthropoda
- Class: Insecta
- Order: Coleoptera
- Suborder: Polyphaga
- Infraorder: Cucujiformia
- Family: Cerambycidae
- Subfamily: Lepturinae
- Tribe: Oxymirini
- Genus: Anthophylax; LeConte, 1850

= Anthophylax =

Genus of beetles

Anthophylax is a genus of beetles in the family Cerambycidae, containing the following species:

- Anthophylax attenuatus (Haldeman, 1847)
- Anthophylax cyaneus (Haldeman, 1847)
- Anthophylax hoffmani Beutenmüller, 1903
- Anthophylax viridis LeConte, 1850
