= Anthophylax hoffmanii =

Scientific classification
- Kingdom: Animalia
- Phylum: Arthropoda
- Clade: Pancrustacea
- Class: Insecta
- Order: Coleoptera
- Suborder: Polyphaga
- Infraorder: Cucujiformia
- Family: Cerambycidae
- Subfamily: Lepturinae
- Tribe: Oxymirini
- Genus: Anthophylax
- Species: A. hoffmanii

Binomial name
- Anthophylax hoffmanii Beutenmüller, 1903

Synonyms
- Anthophilax hoffmani Leng, 1920; Anthophilax hoffmanii Beutenmüller, 1903; Anthophilax hoffmanni Brimley, 1938; Anthophylax hoffmani Monné & Giesbert, 1994; Anthophylax hoffmanni Švácha & Lawrence, 2014; Anthophylax hofmani Boppe, 1921

Species of beetle

Anthophylax hoffmanii is a species of Long-Horned Beetle in the beetle family Cerambycidae. It is found in United States of America.
