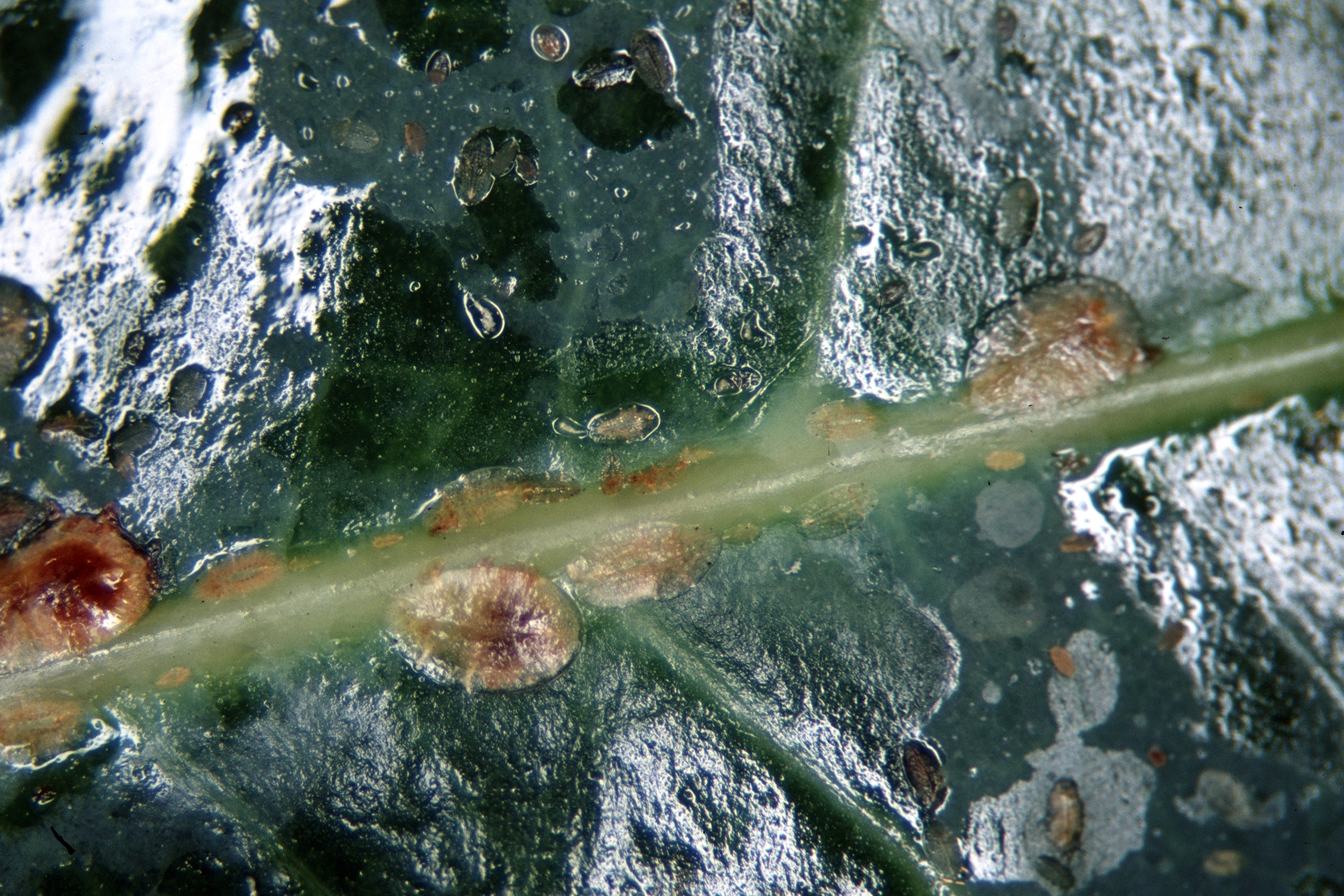

Scientific classification
- Kingdom: Animalia
- Phylum: Arthropoda
- Class: Insecta
- Order: Hemiptera
- Suborder: Sternorrhyncha
- Family: Coccidae
- Genus: Coccus
- Species: C. hesperidum

Binomial name
- Coccus hesperidum Linnaeus, 1758

= Coccus hesperidum =

Species of true bug

Coccus hesperidum is a soft scale insect in the family Coccidae with a wide host range. It is commonly known as brown soft scale. It has a cosmopolitan distribution and feeds on many different host plants. It is an agricultural pest, particularly of citrus and commercial greenhouse crops.

== Description ==
The adult female scale insect is oval and dome-shaped, about 3 to 5 mm (0.12 to 0.20 in) long. It retains its legs and antennae throughout its life. Its cuticle is made of chitin but it does not produce the copious quantities of wax that armoured scales do. It is a pale yellowish-brown or greenish-brown colour with brown irregular speckles, and darkens with age. Male brown soft scale insects are rarely found.

== Hosts ==
The brown soft scale is polyphagous, meaning it feeds on many species of plants. It attacks a wide variety of crops, ornamental and greenhouse plants. In Hawaii, host plants include citrus, loquat, papaya, rubber trees and orchids.

== Biology ==
The brown soft scale is ovoviviparous and produces young mostly by parthenogenesis. Over the course of her life, the female may produce up to 250 eggs, a few being laid each day. The eggs are retained inside the insect until they hatch, at which time small nymphs emerge and are brooded for a few hours before dispersing. These first-stage nymphs are known as crawlers and move a short distance from the mother before settling and starting to feed. They have piercing and sucking mouthparts and feed on the host plant's sap. They are largely sedentary for the rest of their lives and pass through two more nymphal stages before becoming adults. A generation takes about two months, and there may be three to seven generations in a year, depending on temperature. Males are occasionally produced and these pass through four nymphal stages before becoming winged adults.

In order to obtain all the nutrients they need, the scale insects ingest large quantities of sap. They then secrete the excess sugary fluid as honeydew. This is attractive to ants which often tend the scale insects, driving away predators. The brown soft scale does not normally kill the host plant, but the loss of sap probably causes it to grow more slowly and crop less heavily. The main disadvantage to the host is the sooty mould which grows on the honeydew. This reduces the area of leaf available for photosynthesis, and spoils the appearance of the plant, its flowers and fruits.

== Control ==
Traditionally, brown soft scale has been controlled by the use of pesticides, but these have the disadvantage that other insects, friends and foes alike, are also killed. Another approach in citrus is to eliminate ants from the trees, either by preventing the ants from climbing the trunks or by destroying their nests. This allows natural predators to flourish and keep the scale insects under control, although this may lead to a temporary increase in the production of sooty mould on the honeydew that the ants no longer collect. Fungicides can be used to prevent the sooty mould from taking hold. Alternatively, the use of such entomopathogenic fungi, such as Lecanicillium lecanii, has been successfully used in the laboratory. An alternative approach is integrated pest management in which the natural enemies of the scale insects are encouraged. A further possibility is the use of growth regulators such as the hormone hydroprene which disrupts the moulting of juvenile scale insects.
