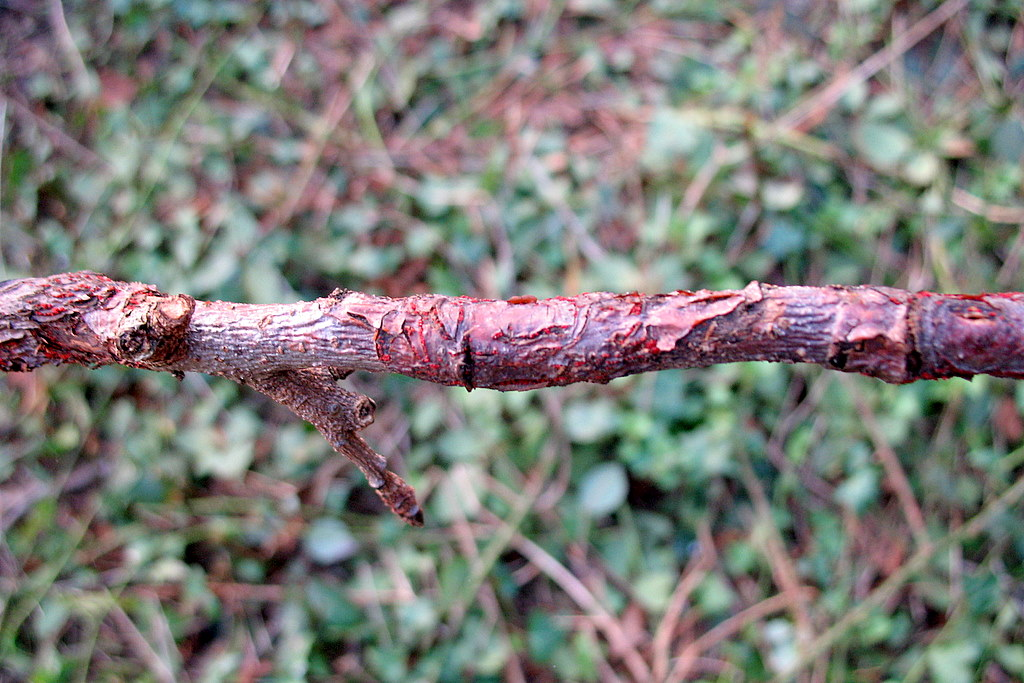
- Fruiting bodies of Neonectria ditissima

Scientific classification
- Kingdom: Fungi
- Division: Ascomycota
- Class: Sordariomycetes
- Order: Hypocreales
- Family: Nectriaceae
- Genus: Neonectria; Wollenw. 1917

Species
- See text

= Neonectria =

Genus of fungi

Neonectria is a genus of fungi in the family Nectriaceae.

It is a cosmopolitan genus commonly distributed in tropical and temperate regions. The species occur as saprobes (processing of decayed (dead or waste) organic matter), pathogens and some species have been isolated as soil inhabitants (Brayford 1993; Chaverri et al. 2011).

Neonectria was linked to the asexual genus Cylindrocarpon. Later phylogenetic analysis revealed that Neonectria and Cylindrocarpon are phylogenetically congeneric and they are not monophyletic (Mantiri et al. 2001; Brayford et al. 2004; Seifert et al. 2003). A taxonomic revision of Neonectria sensu lato was provided by Chaverri et al. in 2011, based on multi-locus phylogenetic analysis, morphological characters and ecological data. Their phylogenetic analysis showed five distinct highly supported clades that correspond to some extent with the informal Neonectria and Cylindrocarpon groups. Hence, three genera llyonectria, Rugonectria and Thelonectria were introduced to accommodate three Neonectria sensu lato informal groups.

'Outline of Fungi and fungus-like taxa' by Wijayawardene et al. lists up to 30 species (in 2020), and around 25 records are listed by Species Fungorum, and GBIF.

== Species ==
As accepted by Species Fungorum;

- Neonectria aquatica D.F. Bao, K.D. Hyde & Z.L. Luo (2023)
- Neonectria austroradicicola (Samuels & Brayford) Schroers (2008)
- Neonectria californica D.P. Lawr. & Trouillas (2019)
- Neonectria candida (Ehrenb.) Rossman, L. Lombard & Crous (2015)
- Neonectria coccinea (Pers.) Rossman & Samuels (1999)
- Neonectria confusa J. Luo & W.Y. Zhuang (2010)
- Neonectria dinghushanica J. Luo & W.Y. Zhuang (2010)
- Neonectria ditissima (Tul. & C. Tul.) Samuels & Rossman (2006)
- Neonectria ditissimopsis P. Zhao, J. Luo & W.Y. Zhuang (2011)
- Neonectria dumontii Brayford & Samuels (2004)
- Neonectria faginata (M.L. Lohman, A.M.J. Watson & Ayers) Castl. & Rossman (2006)
- Neonectria hederae (C. Booth) Castl. & Rossman (2006)
- Neonectria lugdunensis (Sacc. & Therry) L. Lombard & Crous (2014) [Note: type species for Heliscus with potential complications for nomenclature].
- Neonectria magnoliae (M.L. Lohman & Hepting) Stauder & Kasson (2020)
- Neonectria major (Wollenw.) Castl. & Rossman (2006)
- Neonectria microconidia J. Luo, P. Zhao & W.Y. Zhuang (2011)
- Neonectria neomacrospora (C. Booth & Samuels) Mantiri & Samuels (2001)
- Neonectria obtusispora (Cooke & Harkn.) Rossman, L. Lombard & Crous (2014)
- Neonectria phaeodisca (Rossman) Brayford & Samuels (2004)
- Neonectria punicea (J.C. Schmidt) Castl. & Rossman (2006)
- Neonectria quercicola B. Mora-Sala, A. Cabral, Armengol & Abad-Campos (2018)
- Neonectria ramulariae Wollenw. (1917)
- Neonectria shennongjiana J. Luo & W.Y. Zhuang (2010)
- Neonectria tokyoensis Hirooka & Tak. Kobay. (2007)
- Neonectria tsugae (W. Gams) L. Lombard & Crous (2014)
- Neonectria verrucispora (Brayford & Samuels) Brayford & Samuels (2004)

Former species;

- N. amamiensis Hirooka & Tak. Kobay. (2006) = Thelonectria amamiensis, Nectriaceae
- N. castaneicola (W. Yamam. & Oyasu) Tak. Kobay. & Hirooka (2005) = Rugonectria castaneicola, Hypocreales
- N. cinnamomea (Brayford & Samuels) Brayford & Samuels (2004) = Cinnamomeonectria cinnamomea, Nectriaceae
- N. coprosmae (Dingley) Seifert (2003) = Ilyonectria coprosmae, Hypocreales
- N. coronata (Penz. & Sacc.) Mantiri & Samuels (2001) = Thelonectria coronata, Nectriaceae
- N. discophora (Mont.) Mantiri & Samuels (2001) = Thelonectria discophora, Nectriaceae
- N. discophora var. rubi (Osterw.) Brayford & Samuels (2004) = Thelonectria rubi, Nectriaceae
- N. fuckeliana (C. Booth) Castl. & Rossman (2006) = Corinectria fuckeliana, Nectriaceae
- N. galligena (Bres.) Rossman & Samuels (1999) = Neonectria ditissima, Nectriaceae
- N. hubeiensis W.Y. Zhuang, Y. Nong & J. Luo (2007) = Cylindrodendrum hubeiense, Nectriaceae
- N. jungneri (Henn.) Samuels & Brayford (2004) = Macronectria jungneri, Nectriaceae
- N. liriodendri Halleen, Rego & Crous (2006) = Ilyonectria liriodendri, Hypocreales
- N. lucida (Höhn.) Samuels & Brayford (2004) = Thelonectria lucida, Nectriaceae
- N. macroconidialis (Brayford & Samuels) Seifert (2003) = Ilyonectria macroconidialis, Hypocreales
- N. macrodidyma Halleen, Schroers & Crous (2004) = Dactylonectria macrodidyma, Nectriaceae
- N. platycephala (Brayford & Samuels) Brayford & Samuels (2004) = Thelonectria platycephala, Nectriaceae
- N. radicicola (Gerlach & L. Nilsson) Mantiri & Samuels (2001) = Ilyonectria radicicola, Hypocreales
- N. reteaudii Bugnic. (1939) = Calonectria reteaudii, Nectriaceae
- N. rugulosa (Pat. & Gaillard) Mantiri & Samuels (2001) = Rugonectria rugulosa, Hypocreales
- N. sinensis J. Luo & W.Y. Zhuang (2010) = Thelonectria sinensis, Nectriaceae
- N. trachosa Samuels & Brayford (2004) = Thelonectria trachosa, Nectriaceae
- N. veuillotiana (Roum. & Sacc.) Mantiri & Samuels (2001) = Thelonectria veuillotiana, Nectriaceae
- N. viridispora Samuels & Brayford (2004) = Thelonectria viridispora, Nectriaceae
- N. westlandica (Dingley) Samuels & Brayford (2004) = Thelonectria westlandica, Nectriaceae
