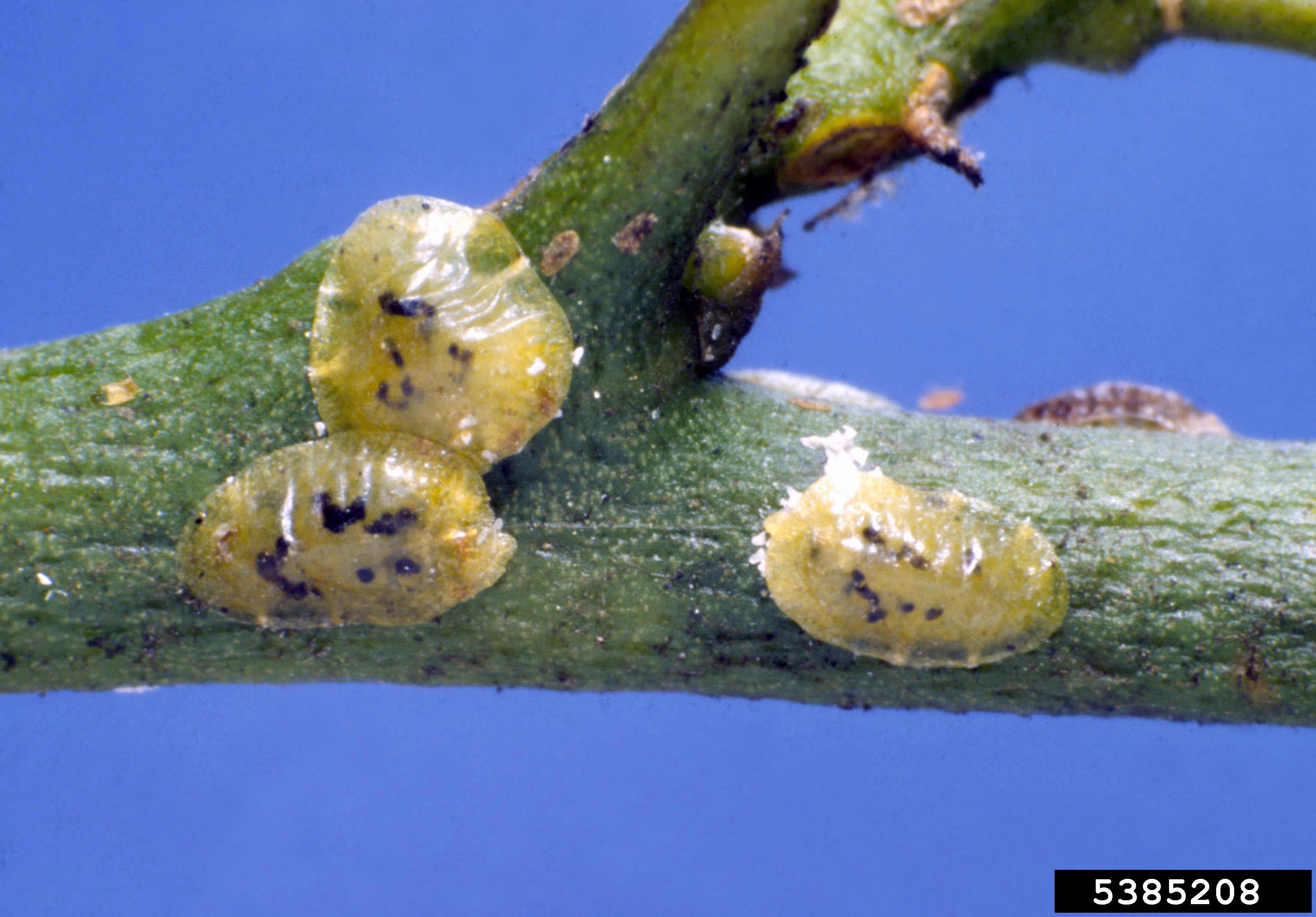

Scientific classification
- Kingdom: Animalia
- Phylum: Arthropoda
- Clade: Pancrustacea
- Class: Insecta
- Order: Hemiptera
- Suborder: Sternorrhyncha
- Family: Coccidae
- Genus: Coccus
- Species: C. viridis

Binomial name
- Coccus viridis (Green, 1889)

Synonyms
- C. viridis bisexualis; C. viridis viridis; Lecanium hesperidum africanum; Lecanium viride

= Coccus viridis =

Species of true bug

Coccus viridis is a soft scale insect in the family Coccidae with a wide host range. It is commonly known as green scale or sometimes coffee green scale because it is a major pest of coffee crops throughout the world.

== Description ==
The adult scale insect is a glossy pale green colour with black internal markings that are visible through the chitinous body wall. It has a flattish elongated oval dome shape and is about three millimetres in width. The front end is rounded while the rear end has a distinctive groove. Adults retain their legs and antennae but mostly remain sedentary. The nymphs are a flattish oval shape, yellowish green, with six short legs. The nymphs shed their skin three times and each instar is larger and more convex than the previous one.

== Biology ==
Males have not been recorded for this species so the populations are composed entirely of females. A mature female lays whitish oval eggs and keeps them underneath her body to protect them. She usually chooses the underside of a leaf and adult scales may often be seen in a line on both sides of the midrib and beside the lateral veins. Eggs hatch in anything between a few minutes and a few hours. The newly hatched crawlers wander off to find somewhere suitable to settle on a leaf or near the tip of a green shoot. Both nymphs and adults suck sap from the phloem of the host plant. When a large number of scale insects are present, their collective feeding causes a yellowing of the leaves which may later fall, a loss of plant vigour and a reduction in crop yield. The scale insects excrete honeydew on which bees, wasps, ants and other insects feed. Sooty mould fungus often grows on the honeydew and this decreases the area of leaf available for photosynthesis, spoils the appearance of the plant and reduces the marketability of fruit. It is especially damaging to young trees after transplanting.

== Hosts ==
This scale is believed to be of Brazilian or African origin but is now widely distributed throughout the tropics. The host range includes vegetable, fruit and ornamental crops as well as many native plants. Economically important crops include Anthurium, atemoya, avocado, cacao, celery, cherimoya, coffee, custard apple, flowering ginger, guava, lime, Macadamia, orange, orchid, Plumeria and sugar apple. It is a serious pest of coffee in many countries causing so much damage that in some areas, coffee production ceased.

== Management ==
Green scale is transported to new areas on infected plants. There should be a thorough inspection of planting material for scale and other insects before it is introduced into a greenhouse. Certain entomopathogenic fungi have been shown to affect green scale but attempts to infect healthy insects with these fungi have been unsuccessful. Controlling ant colonies will assist in reducing levels of attack by green scale (see below).

This scale is susceptible to a number of pesticides including carbaryl, malathion, methomyl and Volck oil. Consideration should be given to the harmful effects of these chemicals on beneficial insects.

== Research ==
This scale is often associated with ants which feed on the honeydew excreted and defend the insects from attack by predators such as lady beetles. The relationship between Pheidole ants and Coccus viridis in Hawaii is mutualistic. In trials involving adding lady beetle larvae and carnivorous lepidopteran larvae to plants infested with green scale with or without ants being present, it was found that the ants actively removed both kinds of larvae, usually within an hour of introduction. The direct effect of this was an increase in scale reproductive success and the indirect effect was a decrease in scale mortality resulting from the removal of predators and a decrease in parasitism rates.

Another research study conducted in the field found a positive correlation between the presence of ants on host plants and the success of green scale insects. On coffee trees from which ants had been excluded the number of scale insects had declined after fifty days and after seventy days, none remained, whereas scales had thrived on ant-infested trees.

A study found that the entomopathogenic fungus, Lecanicillium lecanii, was highly effective in controlling coffee green scale. A study examined the effect of the fungus on coffee green scale in combination with lower than normal applications of either of two insecticides, fenthion and phosphamidon. The use of fenthion resulted in the highest percentage mortality of the scales at the lowest dosages of insecticide. The results from the use of phosamidon were inconclusive, with the results differing in the laboratory and the field.
