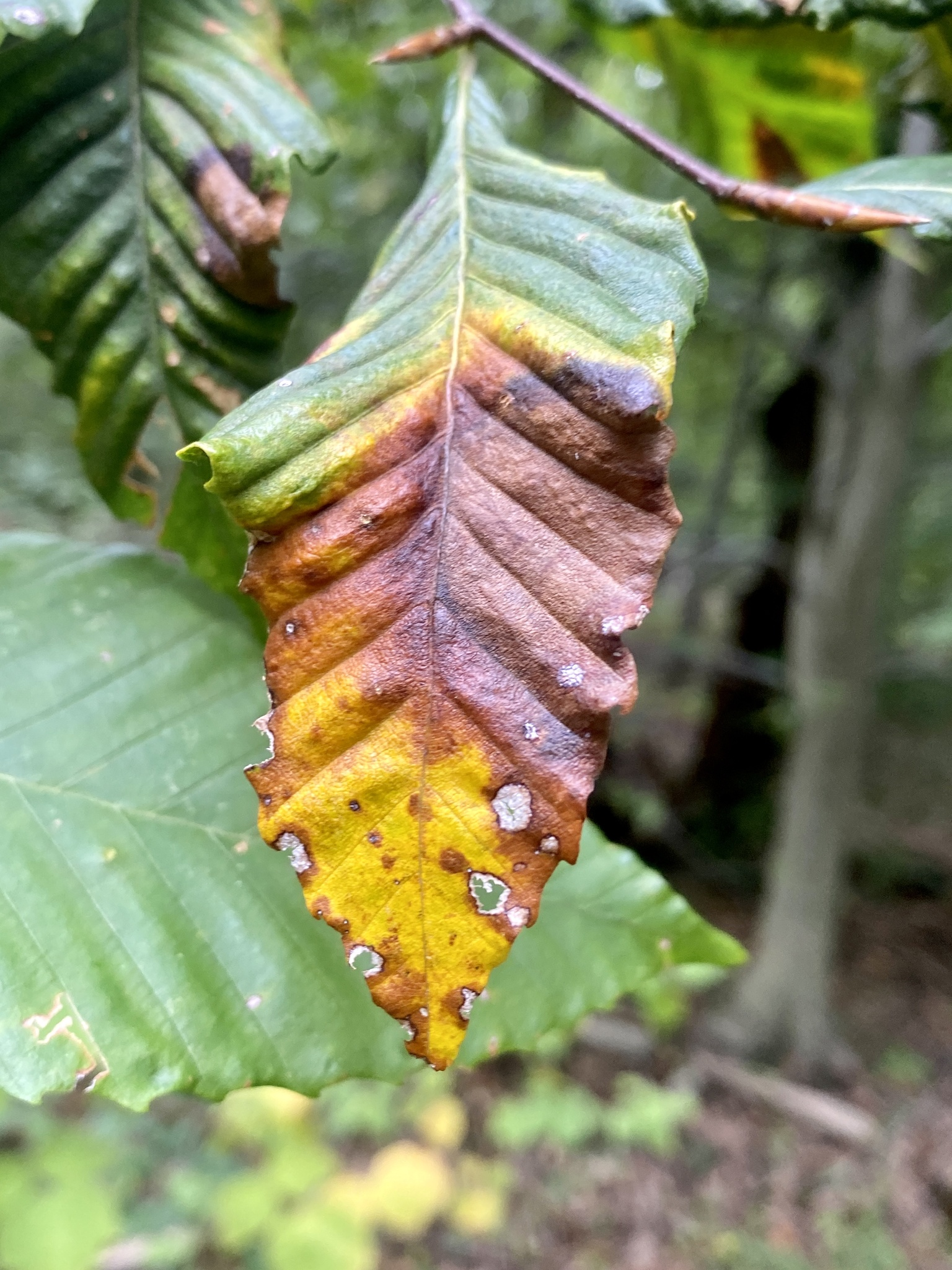
- Damage on a beech leaf from L. c. mccannii

Scientific classification
- Kingdom: Animalia
- Phylum: Nematoda
- Class: Secernentea
- Order: Tylenchida
- Family: Anguinidae
- Genus: Litylenchus
- Species: L. crenatae
- Subspecies: L. c. mccannii

Trinomial name
- Litylenchus crenatae mccannii Handoo, Li, Kantor, Bauchan, McCann, Gabriel, Yu, Reed, Koch, Martin, and Burke, 2020

= Litylenchus crenatae mccannii =

Subspecies of roundworm

Litylenchus crenatae mccannii is a newly recognized nematode subspecies believed to be the cause of beech leaf disease.
