= Coccus longulus =

Scientific classification
- Domain: Eukaryota
- Kingdom: Animalia
- Phylum: Arthropoda
- Class: Insecta
- Order: Hemiptera
- Suborder: Sternorrhyncha
- Family: Coccidae
- Genus: Coccus
- Species: C. longulus

Binomial name
- Coccus longulus (Douglas, 1887)

Species of true bug

Coccus longulus, the long brown scale, is a species of soft scale insect in the family Coccidae. It is found in Europe.
