= Litylenchus =

Scientific classification
- Domain: Eukaryota
- Kingdom: Animalia
- Phylum: Nematoda
- Class: Secernentea
- Order: Tylenchida
- Family: Anguinidae
- Genus: Litylenchus; Zhao, Davies, Alexander & Riley, 2011

Genus of roundworms

Litylenchus is a genus of nematodes belonging to the family Anguinidae. The genus is found in North America and Japan.

== Species ==
- Litylenchus coprosma Zhao, Davies, Alexander & Riley, 2011
- Litylenchus crenatae
