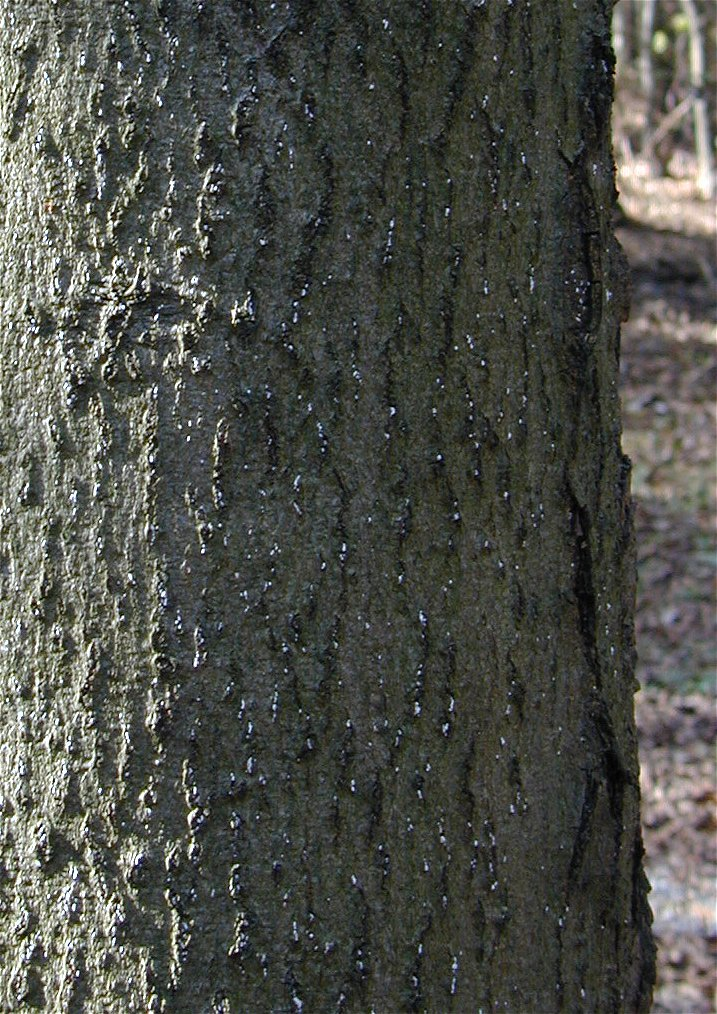
- Cryptococcus fagisuga, the beech scale

Scientific classification
- Domain: Eukaryota
- Kingdom: Animalia
- Phylum: Arthropoda
- Class: Insecta
- Order: Hemiptera
- Suborder: Sternorrhyncha
- Family: Eriococcidae
- Genus: Cryptococcus; Douglas, 1890

Species
- Cryptococcus aceris; Cryptococcus fagi; Cryptococcus fagisuga; Cryptococcus integricornis; Cryptococcus nudatus; Cryptococcus ulmi; Cryptococcus williamsi

= Cryptococcus (insect) =

Genus of true bugs

Cryptococcus is a genus of scale insects in the family Eriococcidae.
