= Beech bark disease =

Disease of beech trees

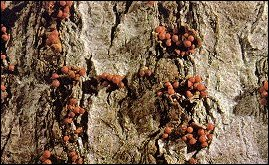
- Perithecia (Fruiting bodies)
- Causal agents: Neonectria faginata and Neonectria ditissima
- Hosts: beech trees
- Vectors: Cryptococcus fagisuga
- EPPO Code: NNECSP
- Distribution: Eastern United States and Europe

Beech bark disease is a disease that causes mortality and defects in beech trees in the eastern United States, Canada and Europe. In North America, the disease occurs after extensive bark invasion by Xylococculus betulae and the beech scale insect, Cryptococcus fagisuga. Through a presently unknown mechanism, excessive feeding by this insect causes two different fungi (Neonectria faginata (previously Nectria coccinea var. faginata) and Neonectria ditissima (previously Nectria galligena)) to produce annual cankers on the bark of the tree. The continuous formation of lesions around the tree eventually girdles it, resulting in canopy death. In Europe, N. coccinea is the primary fungus causing the infection. Infection in European trees occurs in the same manner as it does in North American trees. Though the disease still appears in Europe, it is less serious today than it once was.

== History and distribution ==
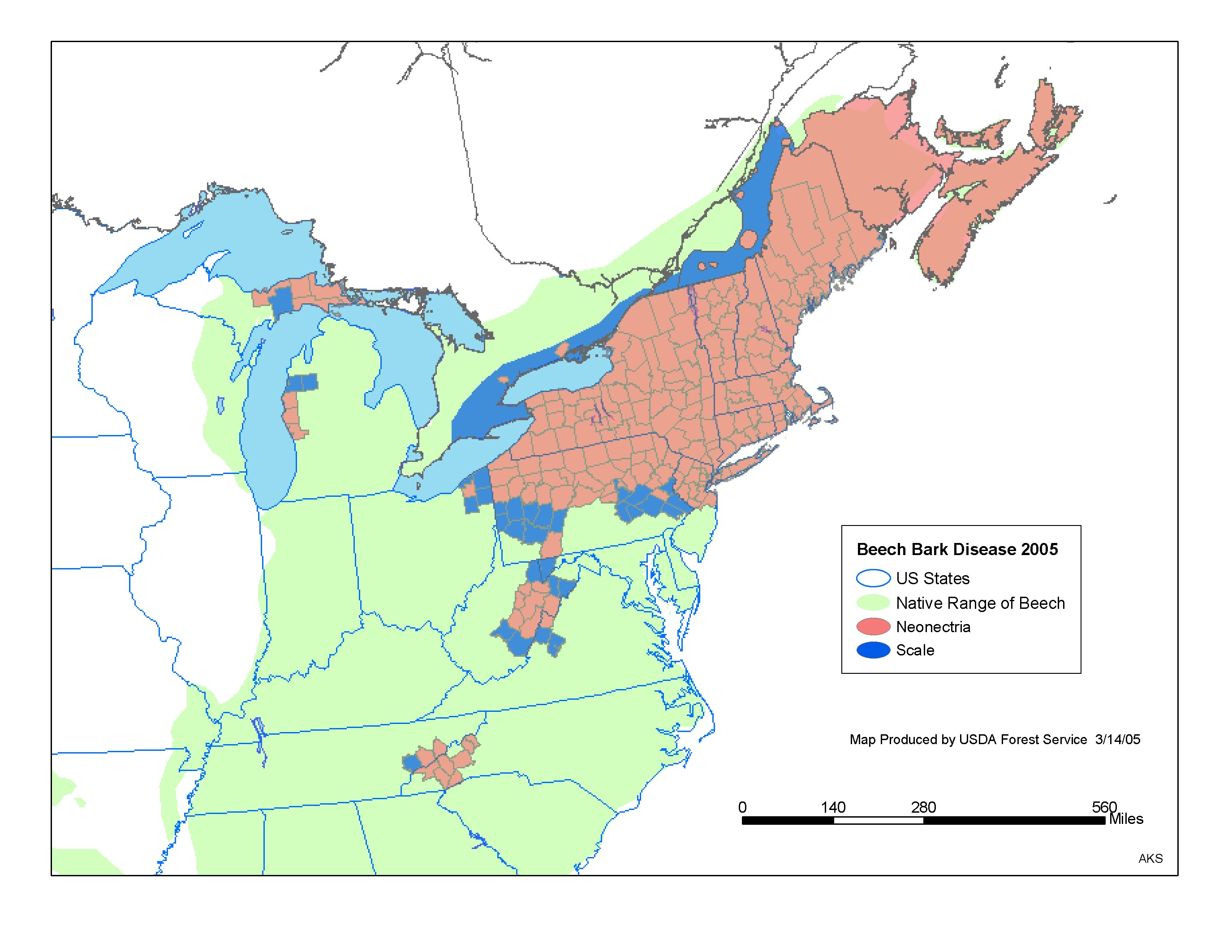
Distribution map of American beech and the beech scale insect

In Europe, beech bark disease was first documented in 1849, while the first North American observation of Cryptococcus fagisuga occurred in 1890 and the first North American observation of Neonectria dates to approximately 1900. At first, it was believed that the scale insect was the main cause of the disease. It was not until 1914 that the Neonectria fungus was associated with the disease. The first outbreak of beech bark disease in North America appeared in American Beech (Fagus grandifolia) in Nova Scotia around 1920. The disease then started to spread to the south and west. The first case of beech bark disease in the United States was reported in 1929 in Massachusetts. By 2004, the disease had spread as far west as Michigan and as far south as western North Carolina.

== Mechanism of infection ==
For beech bark disease to occur, two components are required, an insect and a fungus.

=== Beech scale insect ===
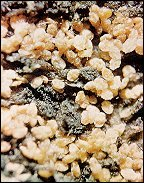
Mature beech scale insects.

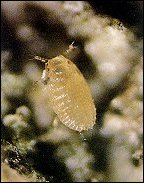
Beech scale nymph.

The beech scale insect, Cryptococcus fagisuga, is invasive to North America and is host-specific, feeding exclusively on beech trees. It can be observed on the trunk and limbs of the tree as woolly, white tufts that will later develop into broad strips. The woolly, white tufts and broad strips are the colonies of the beech scale insect that are formed in tiny crevices along the bark. An adult beech scale insect has a soft body, is yellow in color, ranges from 0.5 to 1.0 millimeter long, and has an elliptical shape. The beech scale insect also has a stylet that it uses to penetrate the bark of the tree for feeding purposes. There are no male beech scale insects and the female insects reproduce parthenogenetically. In mid to late summer, the beech scale insect lays its eggs and dies. The eggs are pale yellow and are laid on the bark in strings of four to eight eggs. The first-stage nymphs begin to hatch in late summer and eggs will continue until early winter. They have short antennae and legs, and move around until they find a suitable and safe place to settle down and force their stylet into the bark to begin feeding. At this point, they begin to secrete the woolly wax cover that they use for protection. This is the second stage of their life cycle and when the spring season arrives they molt again and become adult females. A second type of scale insect, Xylococcus betulae, which is non-host-specific, is native to North America and causes beech bark disease to a lesser degree than Cryptococcus fagisuga.

=== Fungi ===
There are two fungi common to North America that are important to the beech bark disease process. They are Neonectria faginata and Neonectria ditissima. The primary fungus is N. faginata, though N. ditissima is very important in some areas. These fungi infect the tree through the wounds caused by the beech scale insect and then begin to produce spores. Spores are contained in perithecia, which are red, lemon-shaped fruiting bodies that form in clusters on the bark. These perithecia mature in the fall, and once they have become sufficiently moist, they each release eight spores that are carried by the wind to other beech trees. Even though the perithecia occur on dead bark, they still have the ability to produce viable spores the next year.

== Signs and symptoms ==
The first visible sign of a beech scale insect infestation is a woolly, white, waxy covering that the insect secretes. This sign can be observed covering small areas or most of the tree. The amount of waxy material observed depends on the population of the beech scale insect on that tree. The Neonectria fungi also show signs of its presence. An early sign is what looks like a bleeding spot on the tree. A reddish-brown fluid will ooze from the wound site, giving it this appearance. Later, perithecia will form around the dead spot, which is another sign of the disease.

Symptoms of beech bark disease can be observed in the foliage and on the bole of the tree. Foliage may become small, sparse and yellowed. Trees that display a thin, weak crown may persist for several years but may also die without displaying any symptoms. Noticeable symptoms on the bole are the cracking of the bark, the formation of cankers, and beech snap, in which the trunk snaps above head height, under stress from wind as a result of the fungi weakening the wood.

== Management strategies ==
There are a few controls for beech bark disease. One important management strategy is prohibiting the movement of nursery stock, firewood, or other materials that may harbor the beech scale insect. Insecticides, generally not applied under forest conditions, are primarily used on high-value ornamental trees. The use of other organisms as controls is also a possibility. The ladybird beetle is a beetle that preys on the beech scale insect. A fungus that parasitizes the Neonectria fungus could also be employed. The problem with using these organisms to control beech bark disease is that their impact on the disease has not been evaluated extensively. In a forest setting, controlling the beech bark disease is too costly. Timely salvage cutting can reduce economic losses of beech in a forest, however it is preferable to avoid cutting disease-resistant trees. In stands where beech bark disease is established, silvicultural best practice is to retain large overstory trees which show visual resistance (no scale, cankers or fungus), remove heavily infested/dying trees and then treat sprouts from infested trees with herbicides. The residual, resistant parent trees are future sources of resistant seed/sprouts. If herbicides are not a viable option, cut all suckers within 1.5 m of a BBD-killed beech tree. Resistance to beech bark disease in a stand may be 1–5% of trees or more, with significant regional variation. A study of 35 sites in three Canadian provinces found resistance rates ranging from 2.2 to 5.7%.

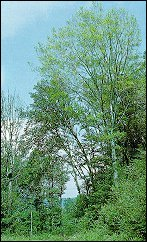
Thin, weak crown with yellow foliage.

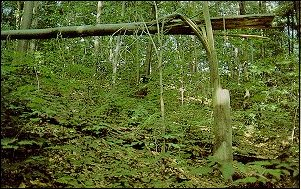
Beech snap.

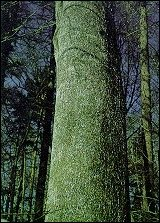
White, waxy secretions.

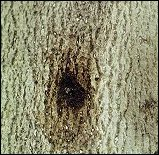
Bleeding Spot.

== See also ==
- Beech leaf disease
