= Maacoccus arundinariae =

Scientific classification
- Kingdom: Animalia
- Phylum: Arthropoda
- Class: Insecta
- Order: Hemiptera
- Suborder: Sternorrhyncha
- Family: Coccidae
- Genus: Maacoccus
- Species: M. arundinariae

Binomial name
- Maacoccus arundinariae (Green, 1904)

Species of true bug

Maacoccus arundinariae is a species of scale insect in the family Coccidae. It is most commonly found in Sri Lanka.
