= Beech leaf disease =

Plant disease

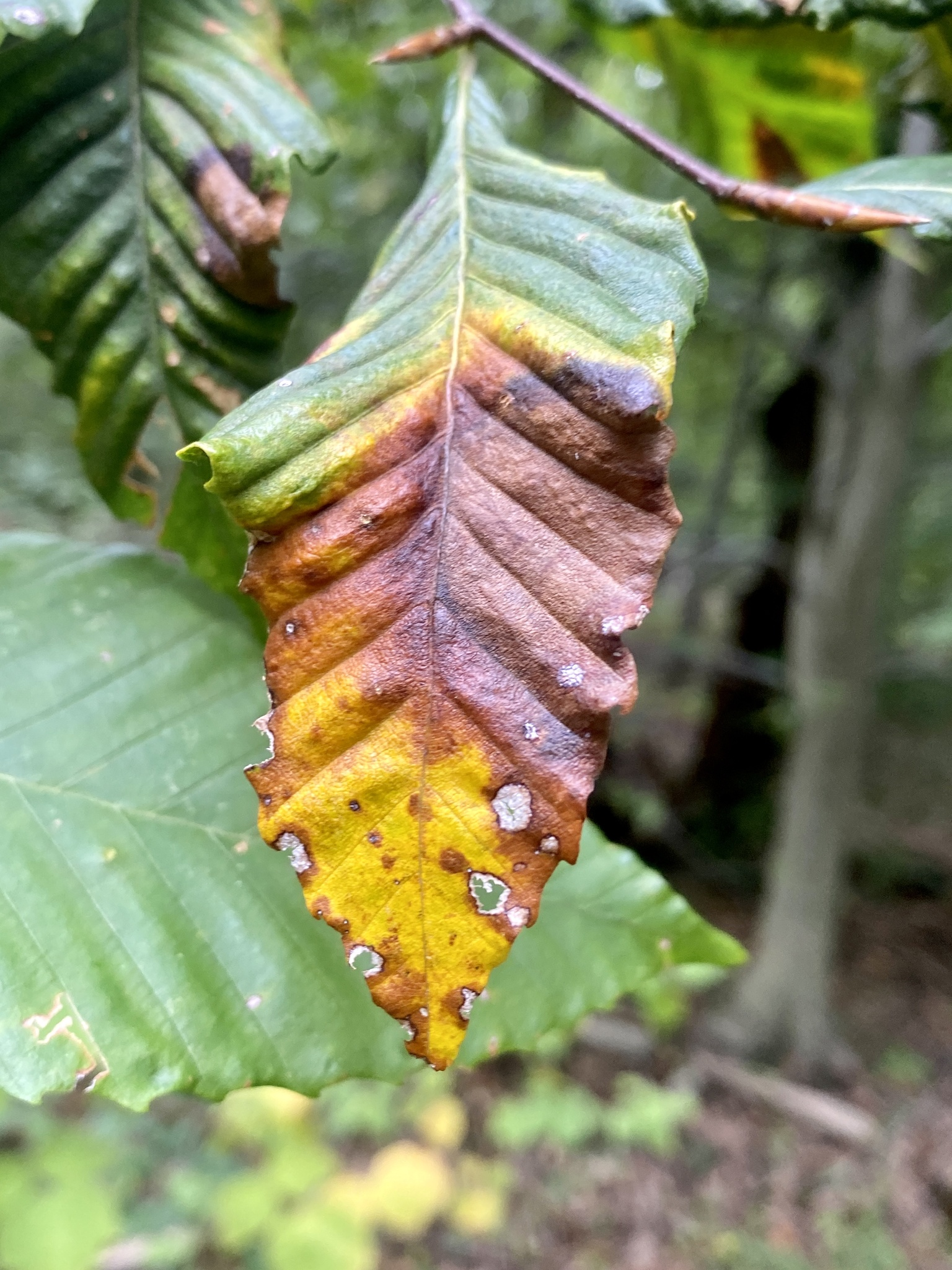
Example of BLD on a beech leaf.

Beech leaf disease (abbreviated BLD) is a lethal disease that affects beech trees believed to be caused by the nematode Litylenchus crenatae mccannii. Beech leaf disease was first identified in 2012 in Lake County, Ohio. The symptoms of the disease appear as a dark green, interveinal banding pattern on the lower canopy foliage, eventually spreading throughout the tree. The symptoms appear to progress through the buds and no new leaves are produced. This eventually results in the death of the tree. The disease has the potential to drastically alter the Eastern deciduous forests of the United States on its own and through potential compounding disease effects.

The disease affects the native American beech as well as the commonly planted European beech. The estimated economic and environmental cost of the loss of the beech in Ohio alone is $225 million. The disease has no known cure.

== Cause ==
The disease is caused by a type of nematode that feeds inside the leaves. The nematodes feeding cause dark bands in the leaves. The worms are most damaging to young trees, which can die in less than five years after the first signs of damage appear. In places where the disease is established, it can prove fatal to 90% of saplings.

The U.S. Department of Agriculture Forest Service believes that insects, birds, as well as human movement are all possible modes of transport for the nematodes.

== Disease range ==
Since its discovery in Lake County, Ohio in 2012, it has rapidly spread to 14 counties in Ohio, as well as to western Pennsylvania, Western New York, and Ontario, Canada. In 2020, it was identified in eastern New York, Long Island, Connecticut, Rhode Island, and Massachusetts. In 2021 it was found in Maine, first in Waldo County, before rapidly spreading throughout the state in following summers. Beech Leaf Disease has also been spotted in Prince William County, Virginia.

== See also ==
- Beech bark disease
