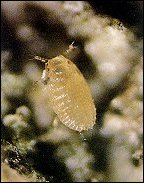
- Nymph

Scientific classification
- Kingdom: Animalia
- Phylum: Arthropoda
- Clade: Pancrustacea
- Class: Insecta
- Order: Hemiptera
- Suborder: Sternorrhyncha
- Family: Eriococcidae
- Genus: Cryptococcus
- Species: C. fagisuga

Binomial name
- Cryptococcus fagisuga Lindinger, 1936

Synonyms
- Coccus fagi Baerensprung, 1849; Cryptococcus fagi Douglas, 1890; Eriococcus fagi Perrier, 1926; Kermes fagi Lindinger, 1957; Pseudococcus fagi Douglas, 1886

= Cryptococcus fagisuga =

Species of true bug

Cryptococcus fagisuga, commonly known as the beech scale or woolly beech scale, is a felted scale insect in the superfamily Coccoidea that infests beech trees of the genus Fagus. It is associated with the transmission of beech bark disease because the puncture holes it makes in the bark allow entry of pathogenic fungi which have been identified as Nectria coccinea var. faginata and sometimes Nectria galligena.

== History and distribution ==
Cryptococcus fagisuga a.k.a. Beech bark disease has been recorded as affecting common beech trees, Fagus sylvatica, in Europe since before 1849. Until 1914 it was thought that the beech scale insect itself was responsible for the disease. Subsequently it was discovered that a fungus, then identified as Neonectria ditissima, was in fact killing the trees infested by the scale. Around 1890 the scale insect was accidentally introduced into Nova Scotia. By 1932, the scale and its associated Neonectria fungus had spread to many areas of the Maritime Provinces and parts of eastern and south central Maine. It continues to spread in North America and is now found in Quebec, Ontario, New England, New York, New Jersey, Pennsylvania and West Virginia. Attempts are being made to discover the geographic origin of beech scale in order to try to identify any natural enemies that might hold promise for its biological control. From these studies and associated ribosomal DNA analysis, it seems likely that the pest originated in the region of northeast Greece, northern Iran, the Caucasus and the Black Sea drainage basin on the host beech subspecies F. sylvatica orientalis.

== Description ==
Adult scales are elliptical and about one millimetre long and are covered by a cream coloured, cottony wax secretion. They have reddish-brown eyes, no wings, rudimentary antennae and legs, and numerous minute wax-secreting glands. The stylet through which they suck sap can be up to two millimetres long.

== Life cycle ==
There are no male beech scale insects and the females reproduce by parthenogenesis. From midsummer onwards, they deposit four to eight pale yellow eggs, attached to each other in strings end to end, on the bark of the trees where they have been feeding. The wingless larvae that hatch out about twenty days later are known as crawlers or nymphs. They have well-developed legs and short antennae. Some remain concealed under the female, which dies after the eggs are laid, and others disperse to cracks and crevices on the tree. A few get washed down or fall to the ground and most of these perish. Occasionally one may find its way to another beech tree, perhaps wafted there by the wind or on the foot of a bird, and founds a new colony. Having found a location on a suitable tree, the crawler forces its tubular stylet into the bark and starts to feed. At this stage, it moults and becomes a second-stage, legless nymph, and will remain sedentary for the rest of its life. It secretes wax from glands and is soon covered in a protective coating of wool-like material. After overwintering it completes a second moult in the spring to become a mature female.

== Biology ==
The beech scale is monophagous, being found only on beech trees, and sucks sap from the parenchyme tissue of the bark. The small wounds produced when it feeds allow the Nectria fungi to invade infested trees. The insect colonises beech trees that are aged at least thirty years. Studies have shown that younger trees produce defensive chemicals which deter infestation. A ladybird beetle Chilocorus stigma feeds on this scale and is common throughout most of the Eastern United States, but this predator does not reduce scale populations sufficiently to control infestations. Persistent severely cold weather may kill beech scale and air temperatures of -37 °C have been shown to be lethal to insects not protected by snow. Although trees are weakened when supporting scale colonies, this does not usually cause mortality, which only occurs after the trees have been invaded by the Nectria fungi. It usually takes three to six years of infestation by the scale insect before the fungus reaches critical levels. Where beech bark disease becomes established, most of the larger trees will die. Some trees seem to be partially resistant to the disease and a small number seem to be completely resistant. This may be partly due to the fact that trees with smooth bark provide fewer cracks and crevices in which the scale insect can flourish.
