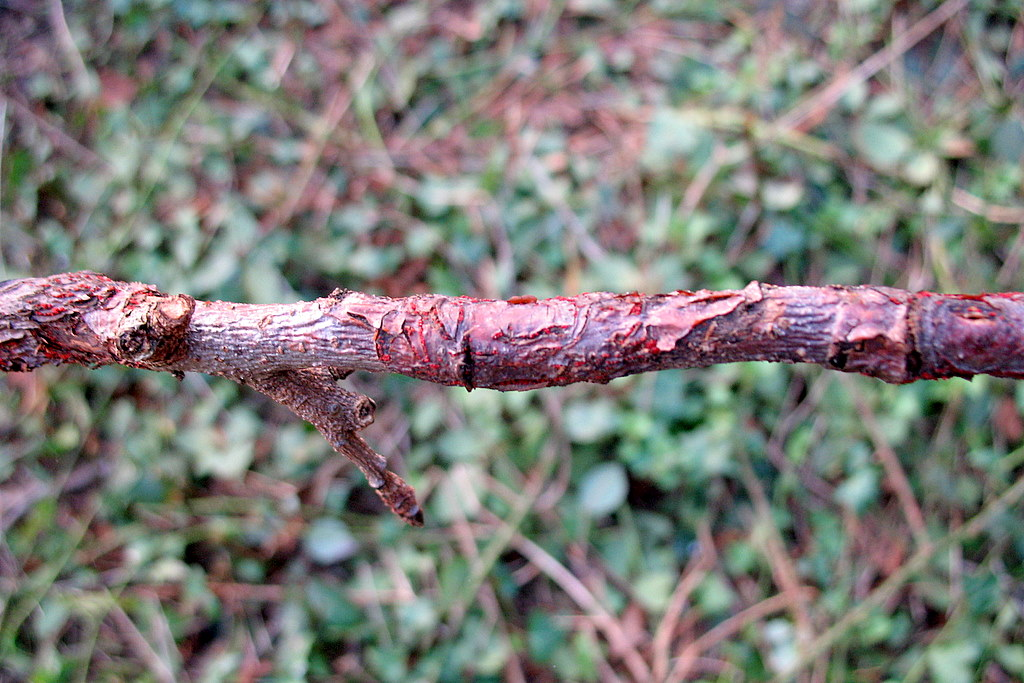

Scientific classification
- Kingdom: Fungi
- Division: Ascomycota
- Class: Sordariomycetes
- Order: Hypocreales
- Family: Nectriaceae
- Genus: Neonectria
- Species: N. ditissima

Binomial name
- Neonectria ditissima (Tul. & C. Tul.) Samuels & Rossman (2006)

Synonyms
- teleomorph: Nectria ditissima Tul. & C. Tul. (1865); Cucurbitaria ditissima (Tul. & C. Tul.) Kuntze (1898); Nectria galligena Bres. (1901); Dialonectria galligena (Bres.) Petch ex E.W. Mason & Grainger (1937); Neonectria galligena (Bres.) Rossman & Samuels (1999); anamorph: Fusarium heteronemum Berk. & Broome (1865); Ramularia heteronema (Berk. & Broome) Wollenw. (1916); Cylindrocarpon heteronema (Berk. & Broome) Wollenw. (1916); Fusarium mali Allesch. (1892); Fusarium sarcochroum f. mali (Allesch.) Ferraris (1910); Cylindrocarpon mali (Allesch.) Wollenw. (1928); Fusarium willkommii Lindau (1909); Cylindrocarpon willkommii (Lindau) Wollenw. (1928)

= Neonectria ditissima =

Species of fungus

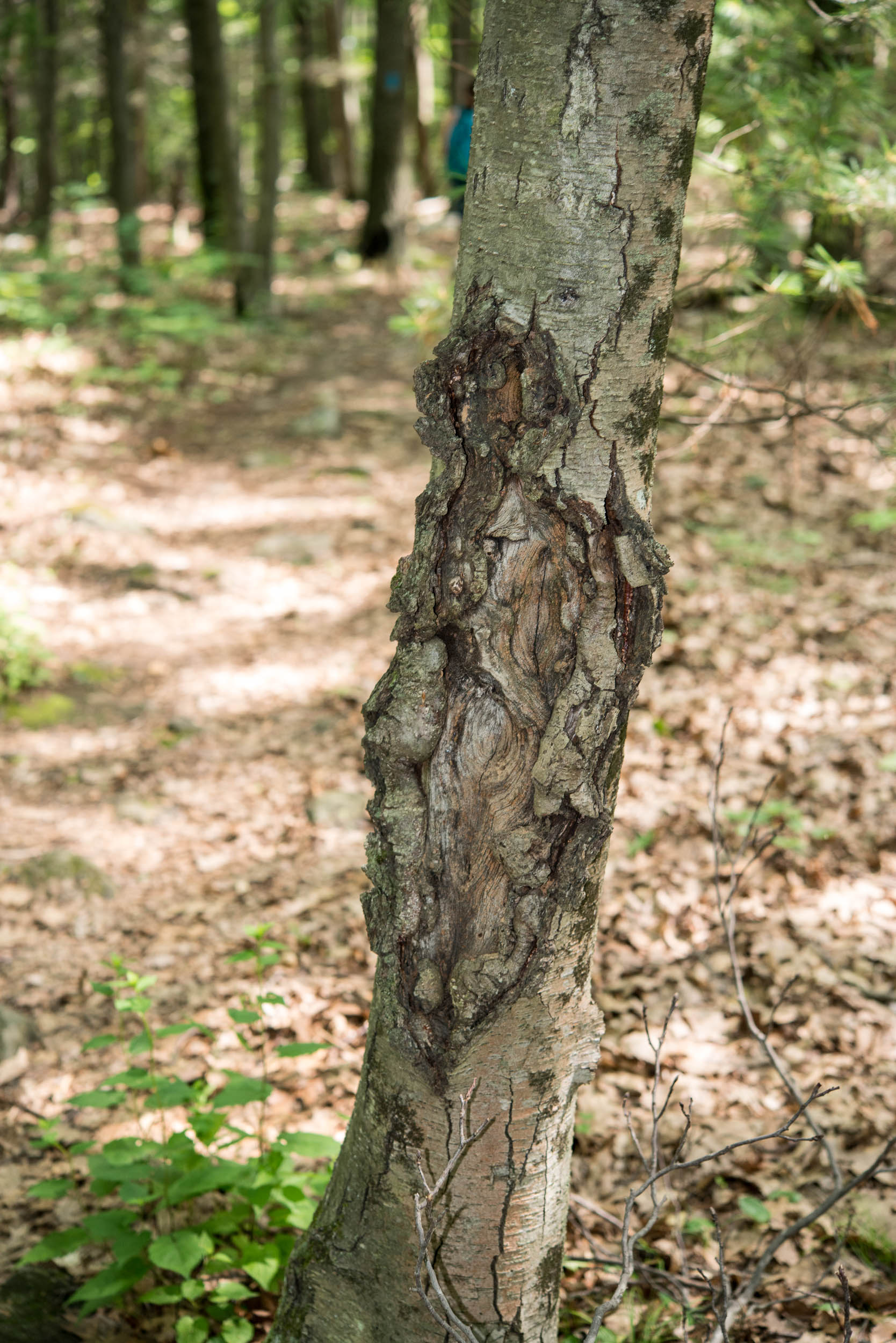
N. galligena canker on trunk

Neonectria ditissima (syn. Neonectria galligena) is a fungal plant pathogen. It causes cankers that can kill branches of trees by choking them off. Apple and beech trees are two susceptible species.

== Host range ==
Neonectria ditissima host range encompass a variety of hardwood tree species such as, Fagus, Populus, Salix, Betula and Acer species. These tree species population are present in both America and Europe. Phylogenetic studies have revealed genetic divergence among both populations, at specific loci (ß-tubulin, RPB2). However, due to high levels of within-population diversity of the American populations, it has been hypothesized that America is N. ditissima place of origin.

== Disease management ==
Neonectria ditissima is a difficult pathogen to eradicate—but there are many ways to limit its spread and infection rate. Effective control requires a combination of cultural and chemical treatments.

=== Cultural control ===
Multiple cultural techniques can manage the spread of N. ditissima. To minimize the number of wounds the pathogen can enter through, select trees that are well adapted to the local climate. In certain areas, trees must be able to resist damage due to environmental stresses such as cold temperatures. If cankers are present, it is important to prune out the damaged tissue in dry conditions. Dry conditions are unfavorable to the pathogen because it prohibits the development of fruiting structures and spore dispersal. It is essential to disinfect the equipment before and after pruning to prevent the spread of the pathogen to uninfected trees. Cankered prunings must be removed from the area and burned to eliminate the risk of continuing spore production. It is crucial to limit the use of high nitrogen, especially in manure, because it encourages and facilitates N. ditissima.

=== Chemical control ===
Fungicides that control N. ditissima are limited. Infection by N. ditissima often occurs through wounds in the autumn and spring-summer period, therefore, it's best to apply fungicides at those times. Fungicides prevent or decrease sporulation of existing cankers, which in turn decreases inoculum available to spread the pathogen. Fungicides may also protect trees from N. ditissima through a fungitoxic deposit over favorable infection sites. A mixture of carbendazim and a scab fungicide, such as dithianon, is the suggested treatment in areas with a severe canker problem. In areas with a reduced risk of canker, it is recommended that a scab fungicide be applied in the spring-summer and copper oxychloride applied at leaf-fall to avoid infection. Although scab fungicides are commonly used for managing apple scab, cankers are also controlled when applied at the correct time. Thiophanate-methyl is another fungicide that is highly effective because it protects trees against the pathogen and suppresses sporulation of already infected plants. However, the application of thiophanate-methyl is limited due to its harm on organisms such as mites.
