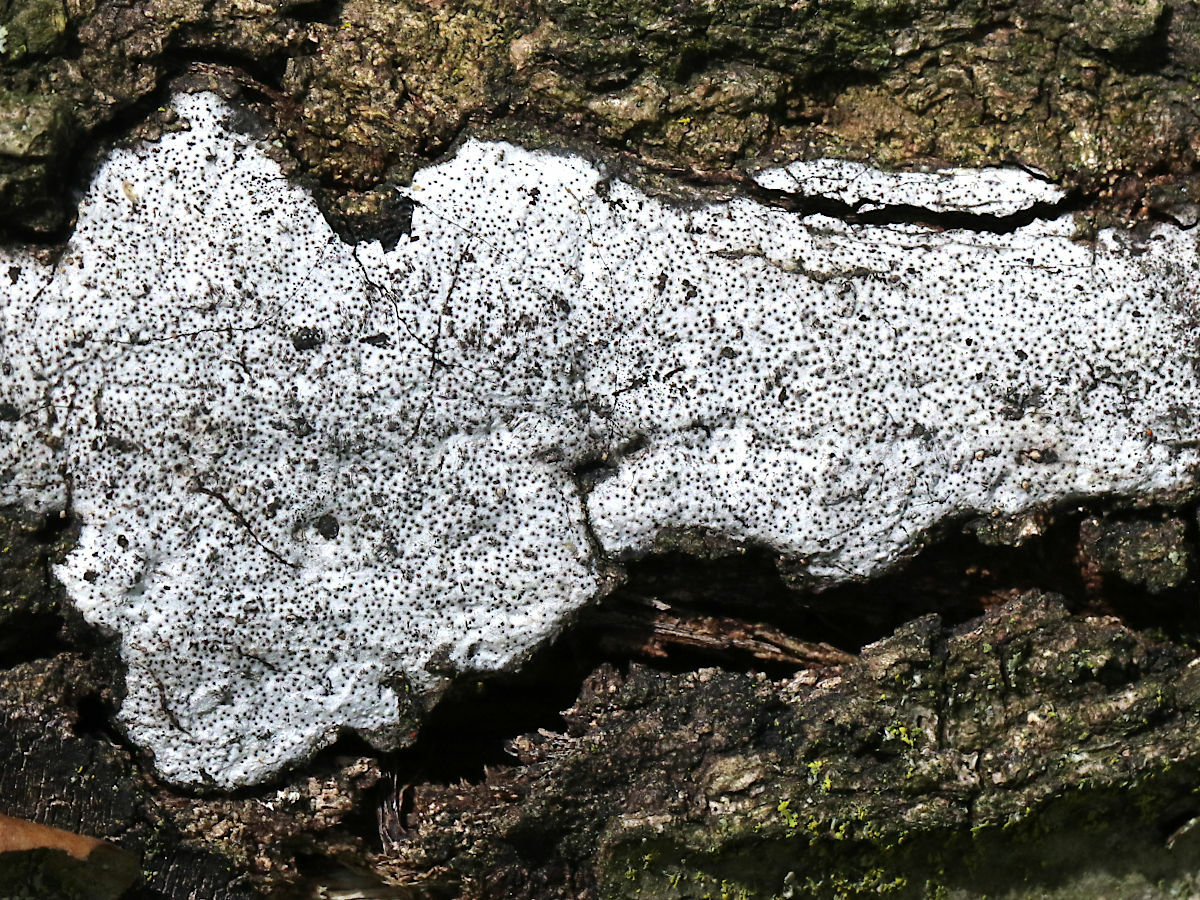

Scientific classification
- Kingdom: Fungi
- Division: Ascomycota
- Class: Sordariomycetes
- Order: Xylariales
- Family: Graphostromataceae
- Genus: Biscogniauxia
- Species: B. atropunctata

Binomial name
- Biscogniauxia atropunctata (Schwein.) Pouzar (1979)

= Biscogniauxia atropunctata =

Species of fungus

Biscogniauxia atropunctata, the hypoxylon canker, is a species of sac fungus in the family Graphostromataceae. Like many other fungi in the genus, it is a plant pathogen; specifically this species can cause Biscogniauxia (Hypoxylon) canker and dieback disease in host trees.

== Taxonomy ==
Biscogniauxia atropunctata contains the following varieties:

- Biscogniauxia atropunctata maritima
- Biscogniauxia atropunctata atropunctata

== Description ==
Patches of the fungus can reach a few metres across. It is white, sometimes with black patches, and usually with a black margin.

=== Similar species ===
In addition to other species within the genus, Diatrype stigma, Camarops tubulina, Kretzschmaria deusta, and species of Camillea can appear similar, as can Arthonia lichens.

== Distribution ==
This species is found in spring and early summer east of the Rocky Mountains of North America.

== Ecology ==
When not pathogenic, Biscogniauxia atropunctata is saprobic on oak and other hardwood trees, causing a white rot on the host deadwood. The fruiting body grows in patches with a whitish-gray surface covered by black dots that grow to be blackened overall.

The fungus can colonize healthy trees and live undetected and harmlessly in the bark and sapwood for some time, its spread kept in check by the host's natural defenses. However, when the trees become stressed, the fungus invades weakened host tissues, causing the dieback disease. Initially the infection kills affected branches, then progresses down the trunk to form a canker, girdling the tree and killing the entire crown.
