= Biscogniauxia capnodes =

Scientific classification
- Domain: Eukaryota
- Kingdom: Fungi
- Division: Ascomycota
- Class: Sordariomycetes
- Order: Xylariales
- Family: Graphostromataceae
- Genus: Biscogniauxia
- Species: B. capnodes

Binomial name
- Biscogniauxia capnodes (Berk.) Y.M.Ju & J.D.Rogers (1998)

Synonyms
- Anthostoma capnodes (Berk.) Sacc. (1882); Auerswaldia maxima Massee (1901); Biscogniauxia capnodes (Berk.) Y.M.Ju & J.D.Rogers (1998); Biscogniauxia nummularia var. merrillii (Bres.) Van der Gucht (1992); Biscogniauxia nummularia var. pseudopachyloma (Speg.) Whalley (1995); Diatrype capnodes (Berk.) Curr. (1858); Diatrype pachyloma (Lév.) Sacc. (1882); Hypoxylon asarcodes (Theiss.) J.H.Mill. ex Teng, (1939); Hypoxylon capnodes (Berk.) Berk. & Broome ex Cooke (1883); Hypoxylon intermedium Speg. (1884); Hypoxylon nummularium var. merrillii (Bres.) J.H.Mill. ex Dennis (1960); Hypoxylon nummularium var. pseudopachyloma (Speg.) J.H.Mill. (1961); Hypoxylon pachyloma (Lév.) Cooke (1881); Hypoxylon porteri Speg. (1921); Hypoxylon pseudopachyloma Speg. (1888); Hypoxylon ramosum Schwein. ex Cooke (1883); Nummularia alabatensis H.S.Yates (1917); Nummularia asarcodes Theiss. (1908); Nummularia asarcodes f. griseoatra Theiss. (1910); Nummularia bulliardii var. stenosperma Theiss. (1908); Nummularia lataniaecola Rehm & Bref. (1891); Nummularia mauritanica Berk. & Cooke (1883); Nummularia maxima (Massee) Theiss. & Syd. (1914); Nummularia merrillii Bres. (1915); Nummularia pachyloma (Lév.) Cooke (1883); Nummularia starbaeckii Sacc. & Traverso (1911); Nummularia tenuis Starbäck (1905); Numulariola merrillii (Bres.) P.M.D.Martin (1969); Numulariola pseudopachyloma (Speg.) P.M.D.Martin, (1969); Sphaeria capnodes Berk. (1845); Sphaeria pachyloma Lév. [as 'pachiloma'] (1846)

Species of fungus

Biscogniauxia capnodes is a species of fungus in the family Graphostromataceae. It is a plant pathogen.
