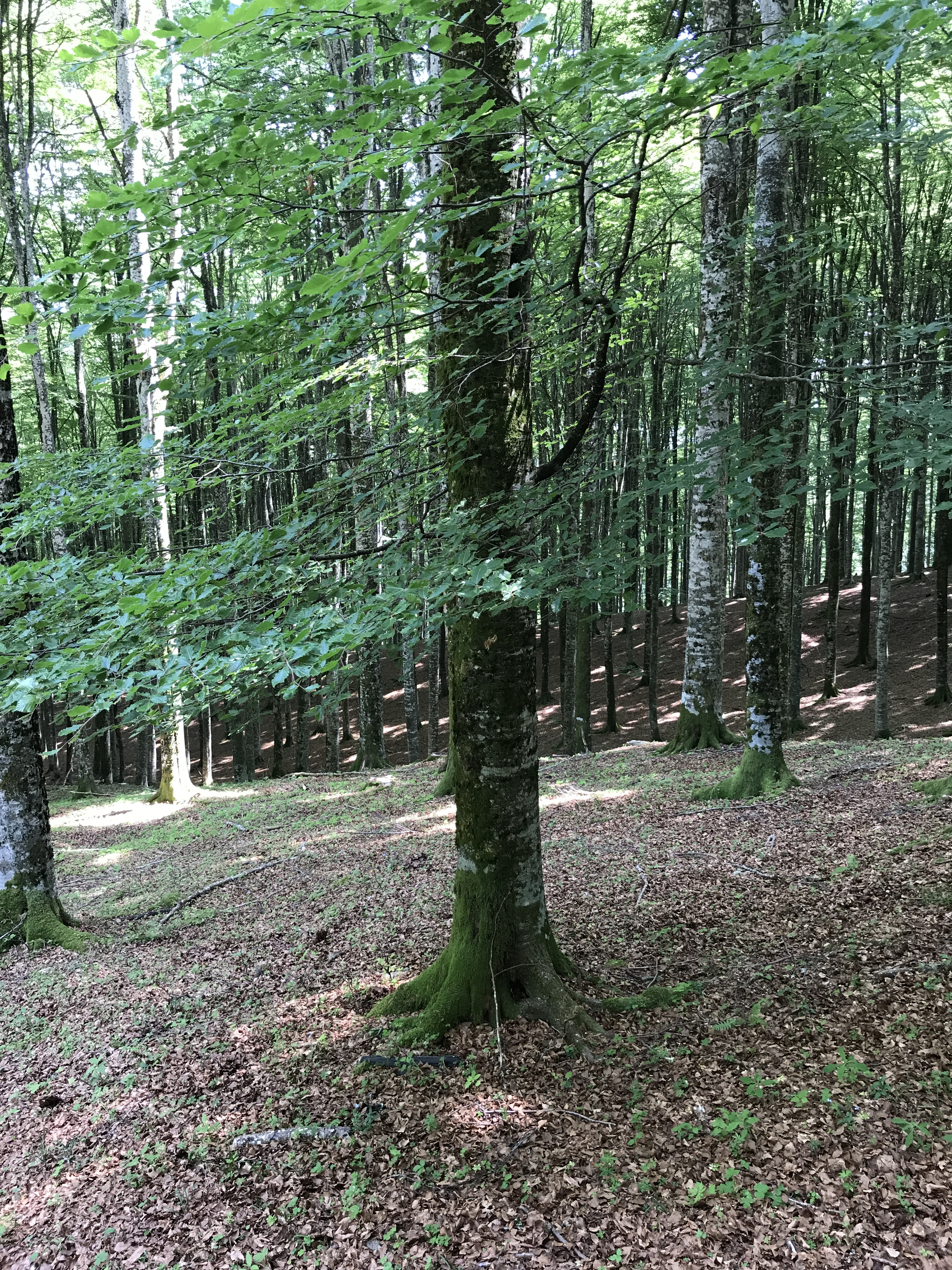
- Alpine forest (Italy)

Conservation status
- Least Concern (IUCN 3.1)

Scientific classification
- Kingdom: Plantae
- Clade: Tracheophytes
- Clade: Angiosperms
- Clade: Eudicots
- Clade: Rosids
- Order: Fagales
- Family: Fagaceae
- Genus: Fagus
- Species: F. sylvatica

Binomial name
- Fagus sylvatica L.
- Distribution map Native; Introduced and naturalised

Synonyms
- Castanea fagus Scop.; Fagus aspleniifolia (Dum.Cours.) Raf.; Fagus comptoniifolia Desf.; Fagus cuprea Hurter ex A.DC.; Fagus echinata Gilib.; Fagus incisa Dippel; Fagus laciniata A.DC.; Fagus purpurea (Aiton) Dum.Cours.; Fagus purpurea var. roseomarginata Cripps; Fagus purpurea tricolor (Simon-Louis ex K.Koch) Pynaert; Fagus sylvatica var. aenea Dum.Cours.; Fagus sylvatica var. albovariegata Weston; Fagus sylvatica f. albovariegata (Weston) Domin; Fagus sylvatica var. aspleniifolia Dum.Cours.; Fagus sylvatica f. aspleniifolia (Dum.Cours.) C.K.Schneid.; Fagus sylvatica var. atropunicea Weston; Fagus sylvatica f. atropunicea (Weston) Domin; Fagus sylvatica f. aureovariegata C.K.Schneid.; Fagus sylvatica f. bornyensis Simon-Louis ex Beissn.; Fagus sylvatica var. cochleata Dippel; Fagus sylvatica var. colorata A.DC.; Fagus sylvatica var. coriacea Wallr.; Fagus sylvatica var. cristata Dum.Cours.; Fagus sylvatica f. cristata (Dum.Cours.) Schelle; Fagus sylvatica f. fastigiata Simon-Louis ex K.Koch; Fagus sylvatica var. foliis-striatis Dippel; Fagus sylvatica var. grandidentata Dippel; Fagus sylvatica var. heterophylla Loudon; Fagus sylvatica var. laciniata Vignet; Fagus sylvatica f. laciniata (Vignet) Domin; Fagus sylvatica var. latifolia Loudon; Fagus sylvatica f. luteovariegata (Weston) Domin; Fagus sylvatica var. luteovariegata Weston; Fagus sylvatica var. miltonensis A.Henry; Fagus sylvatica pendula (Dum.Cours.) Lodd.; Fagus sylvatica var. pendula Dum.Cours.; Fagus sylvatica f. pendula (Dum.Cours.) Schelle; Fagus sylvatica pendula-purpurea Graebener; Fagus sylvatica var. purpurea Aiton in Hortus Kew. 3: 362 (1789); Fagus sylvatica f. purpurea (Aiton) Schelle; Fagus sylvatica purpurea-latifolia Jacob-Makoy; Fagus sylvatica purpurea-pendula Van Geert; Fagus sylvatica var. purpureopendula H.Jaeger; Fagus sylvatica f. purpureopendula (H.Jaeger) Rehder; Fagus sylvatica var. pyramidalis Dippel; Fagus sylvatica f. quercifolia C.K.Schneid.; Fagus sylvatica var. quercifolia (C.K.Schneid.) Geerinck; Fagus sylvatica var. quercoides Pers.; Fagus sylvatica f. quercoides (Pers.) Aug.DC.; Fagus sylvatica var. remillyensis (Simon-Louis) A.Henry; Fagus sylvatica remillyensis Simon-Louis; Fagus sylvatica f. retroflexa Dippel; Fagus sylvatica rohanii Körb.; Fagus sylvatica f. rohanii (Körb.) C.K.Schneid.; Fagus sylvatica f. roseomarginata (Cripps) Domin; Fagus sylvatica f. roseomarginatis Dippel; Fagus sylvatica rotundifolia Jackman; Fagus sylvatica f. rotundifolia (Jackman) Rehder; Fagus sylvatica f. salicifolia Dippel; Fagus sylvatica var. sanguinea Amo; Fagus sylvatica subsp. Sanguinea (Amo) Arcang.; Fagus sylvatica var. suentelensis Schelle; Fagus sylvatica var. suntalensis Beissn.; Fagus sylvatica var. tortuosa Pépin; Fagus sylvatica proles tortuosa (Pépin) Rouy; Fagus sylvatica f. tortuosa (Pépin) Hegi; Fagus sylvatica f. tricolor Simon-Louis ex K.Koch; Fagus sylvatica var. variegata Dippel; Fagus sylvatica var. vulgaris Aiton; Fagus sylvatica var. zlatia Späth ex E.Goeze; Fagus sylvatica f. zlatia (Späth ex E.Goeze) Schelle; Fagus sylvestris Gaertn.; Fagus tortuosa (Dippel) F.Boden

= Fagus sylvatica =

Species of deciduous tree

Fagus sylvatica, the European beech or common beech, is a species of tree in the flowering plant family Fagaceae. It can grow to a height of more than 40 metres (130 feet) and has smooth silvery-grey bark, large leaf area, and a short trunk with low branches. It is native to much of Europe, growing in humid climates.

The species is cultivated as an ornamental, and has been spread beyond its original range, including in North America. Numerous cultivars have been developed, including the showy copper beech, Fagus sylvatica purpurea. Although slightly toxic due to the tannins and alkaloids they contain, the nuts are consumed by animals and humans. The trees are used for timber, such as the making of furniture.

== Description ==
Fagus sylvatica is a large tree with smooth silvery-grey bark, a large leaf area, and a short trunk with low branches. It is capable of reaching heights of up to 50 metres (160 feet) tall and 3 m (10 ft) trunk diameter, though more typically 25–35 m (82–115 ft) tall and up to 1.5 m (5 ft) trunk diameter. A 10-year-old sapling will stand about 4 m (13 ft) tall. Undisturbed, the European beech has a lifespan of 300 years; one tree at the Valle Cervara site was more than 500 years old, the oldest known in the Northern Hemisphere. In cultivated forest stands trees are normally harvested at 80–120 years of age. 30 years are needed to attain full maturity (as compared to 40 for American beech). Like most trees, its form depends on the location; in forest areas, F. sylvatica grows to over 30 m (98 ft), with branches being high up on the trunk. In open locations, it will become much shorter (typically 20 m (66 ft)) but more massive with a broader crown and stouter trunk.

The leaves are alternate, simple, and entire or with a slightly crenate margin, 5–10 cm (2–3 7/8 in) long and 3–7 cm (1.2–2.8 in) broad, with 6–7 veins on each side of the leaf (as opposed to 7–10 veins in F. orientalis). When crenate, there is one point at each vein tip, never any points between the veins. The buds are long and slender, 15–30 mm (5/8–1 1/8 in) long and 2–3 mm (3/32–1/8 in) thick, but thicker, up to 4–5 mm (1/8–1/4 in), where the buds include flower buds.

The leaves of beech are often not abscissed (dropped) in the autumn and instead remain on the tree until the spring. This process is called marcescence. This particularly occurs when trees are saplings or when plants are clipped as a hedge (making beech hedges attractive screens, even in winter), but it also often continues to occur on the lower branches when the tree is mature.

The species is monoecious. The male flowers are borne in small catkins, a hallmark of the Fagales order. The female flowers produce beechnuts, small triangular nuts 15–20 mm (5/8–3/4 in) long and 7–10 mm (1/4–3/8 in) wide at the base; there are two nuts in each cupule, maturing in the autumn 5–6 months after pollination. Flower and seed production is particularly abundant in years following a hot, sunny and dry summer, though rarely for two years in a row. Small quantities of seeds may be produced around 10 years of age, but not a heavy crop until the tree is at least 30 years old.

Spring leaf budding by the European beech is triggered by a combination of day length and temperature. Bud break each year is from the middle of April to the beginning of May, often with remarkable precision (within a few days). It is more precise in the north of its range than the south, and at 600 m (2,000 ft) than at sea level.

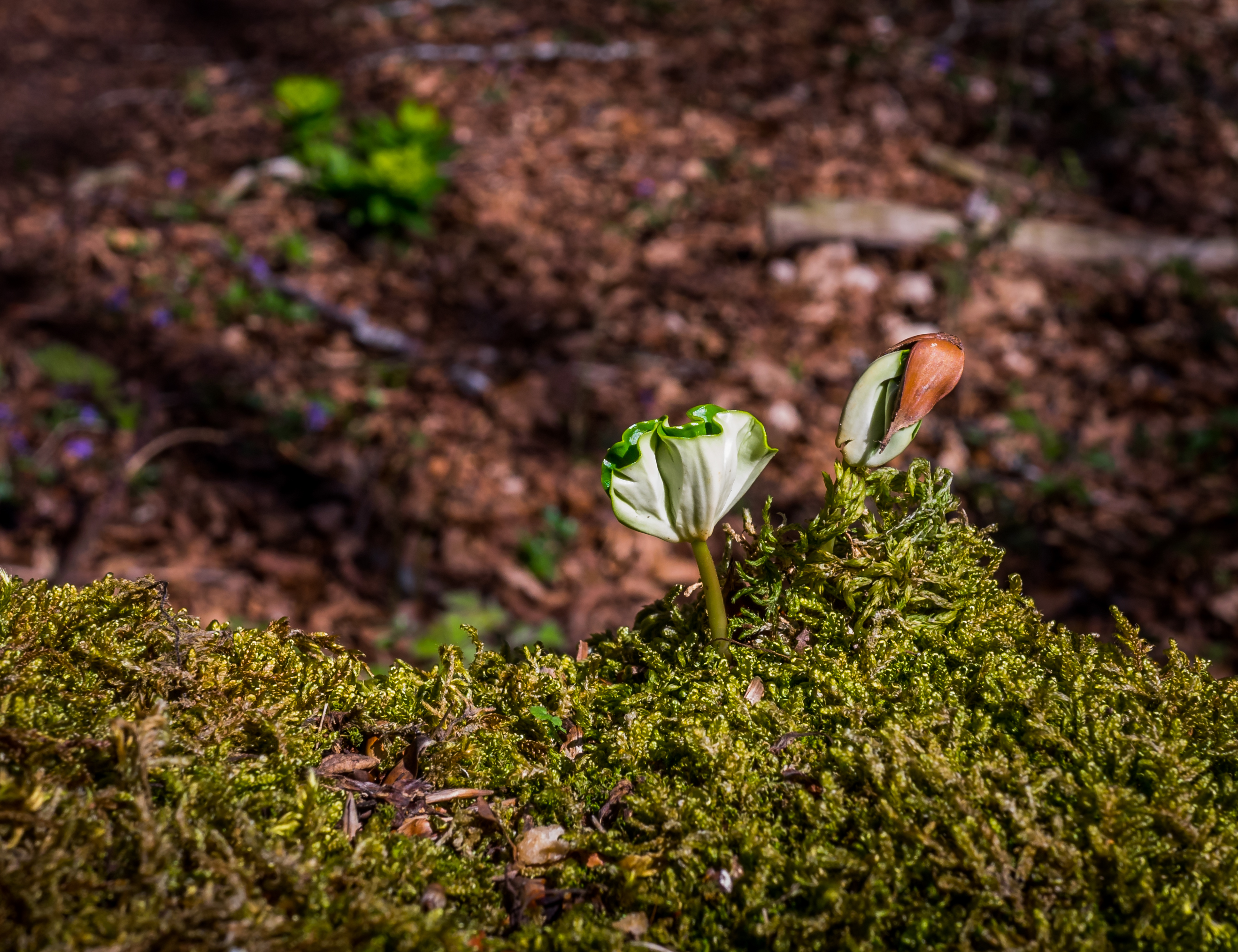
Seedlings

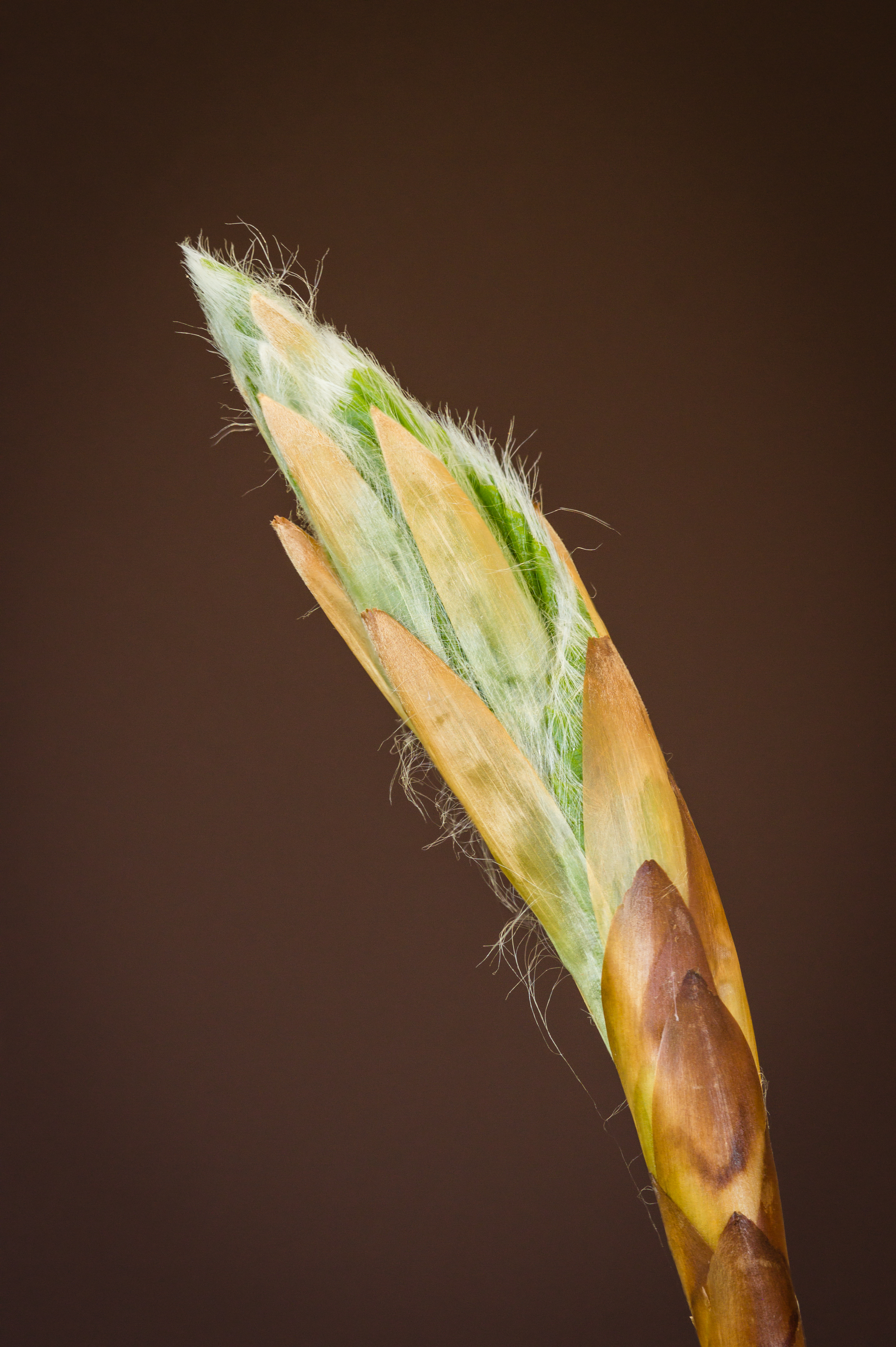
Swollen leaf bud

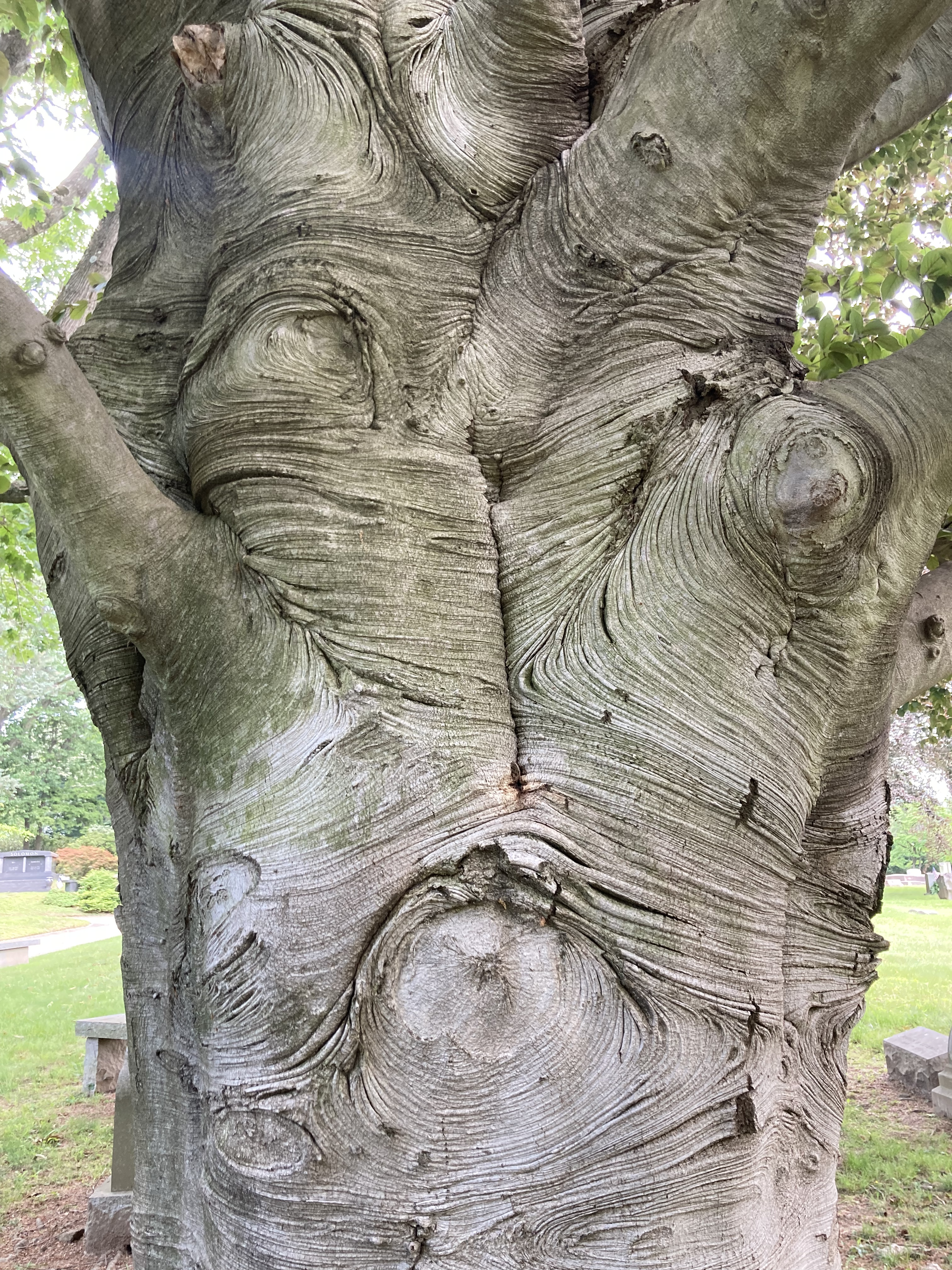
Bark

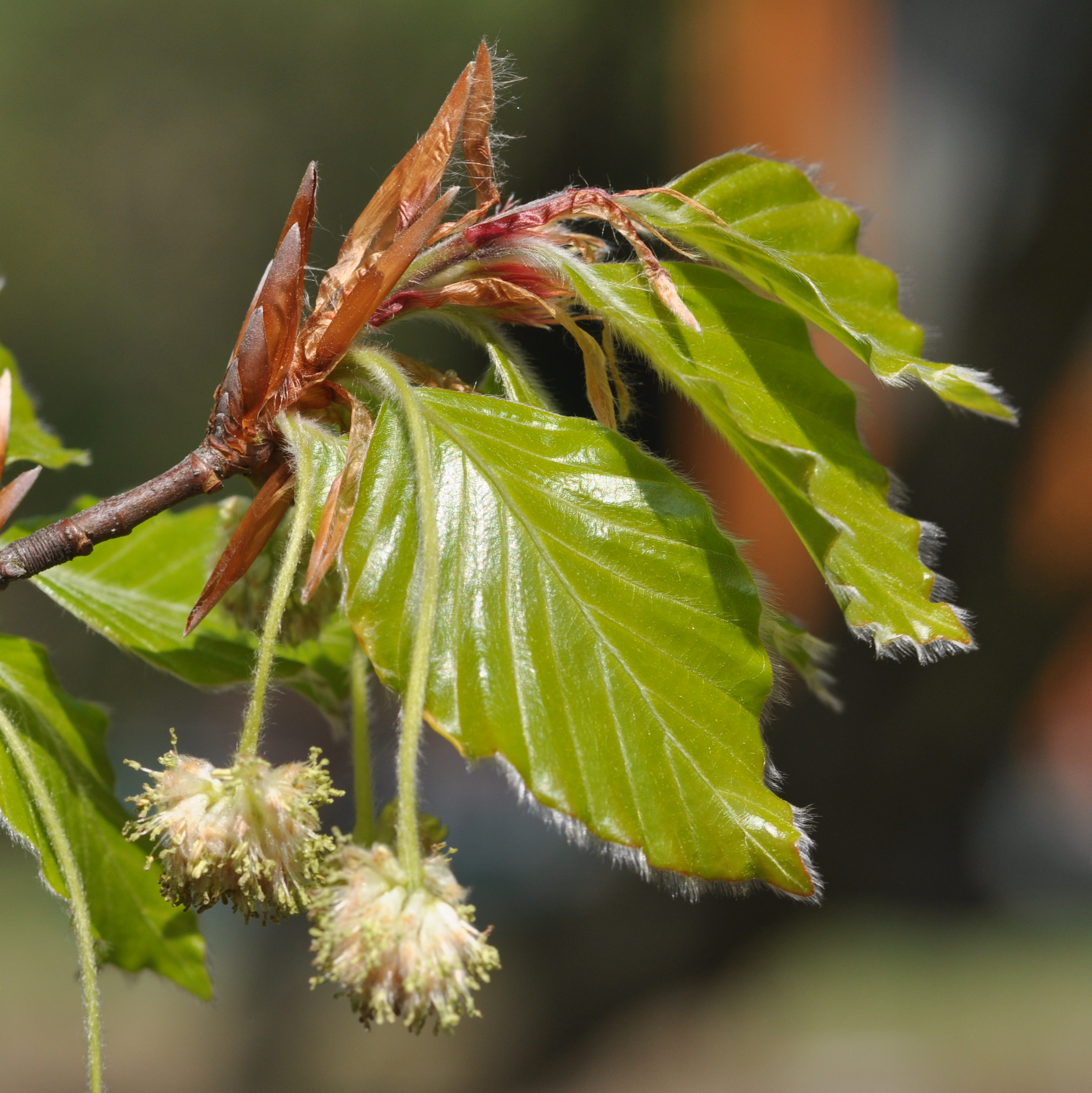
Leaves and inflorescence

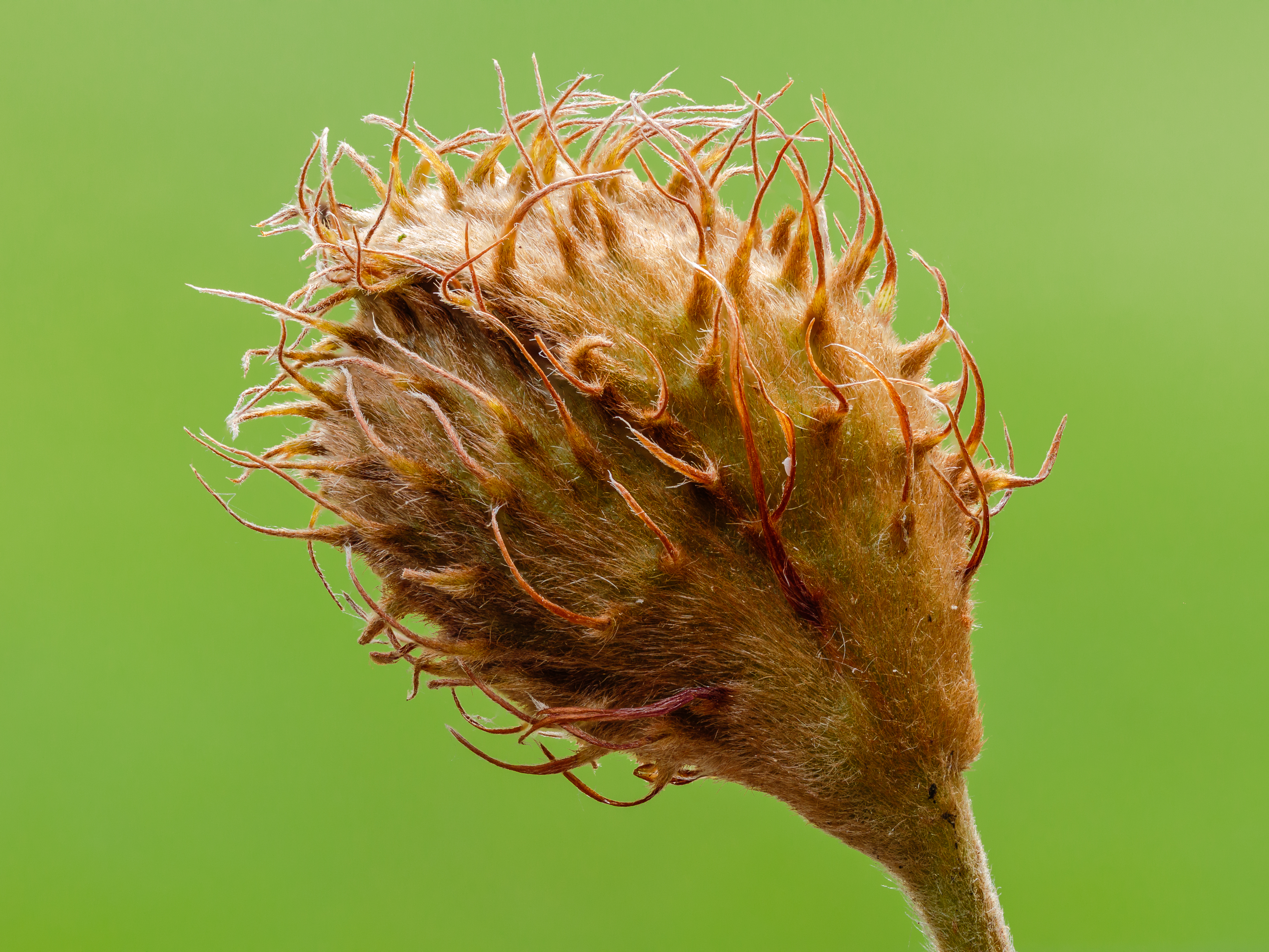
Immature fruit

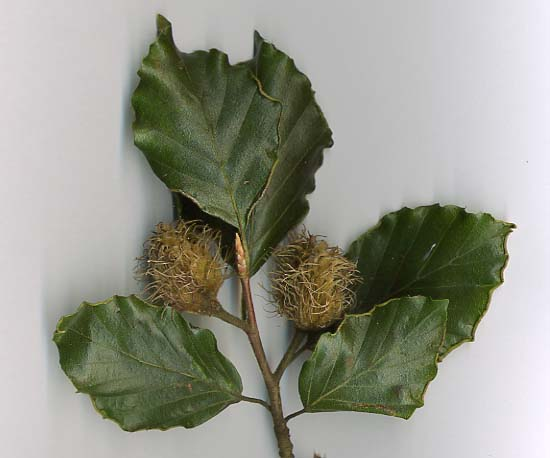
Shoot with nut cupules

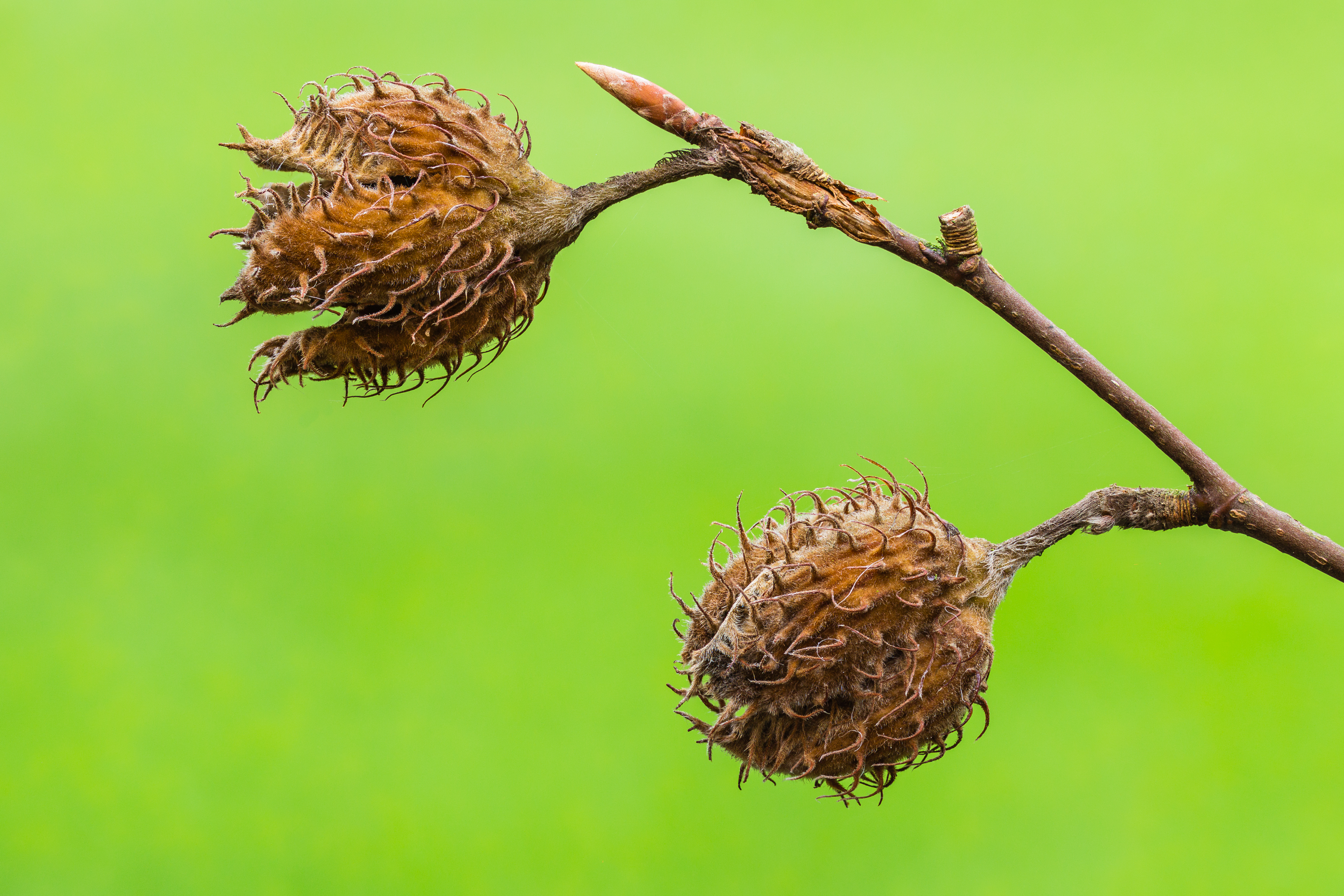
Half-opened seed pods

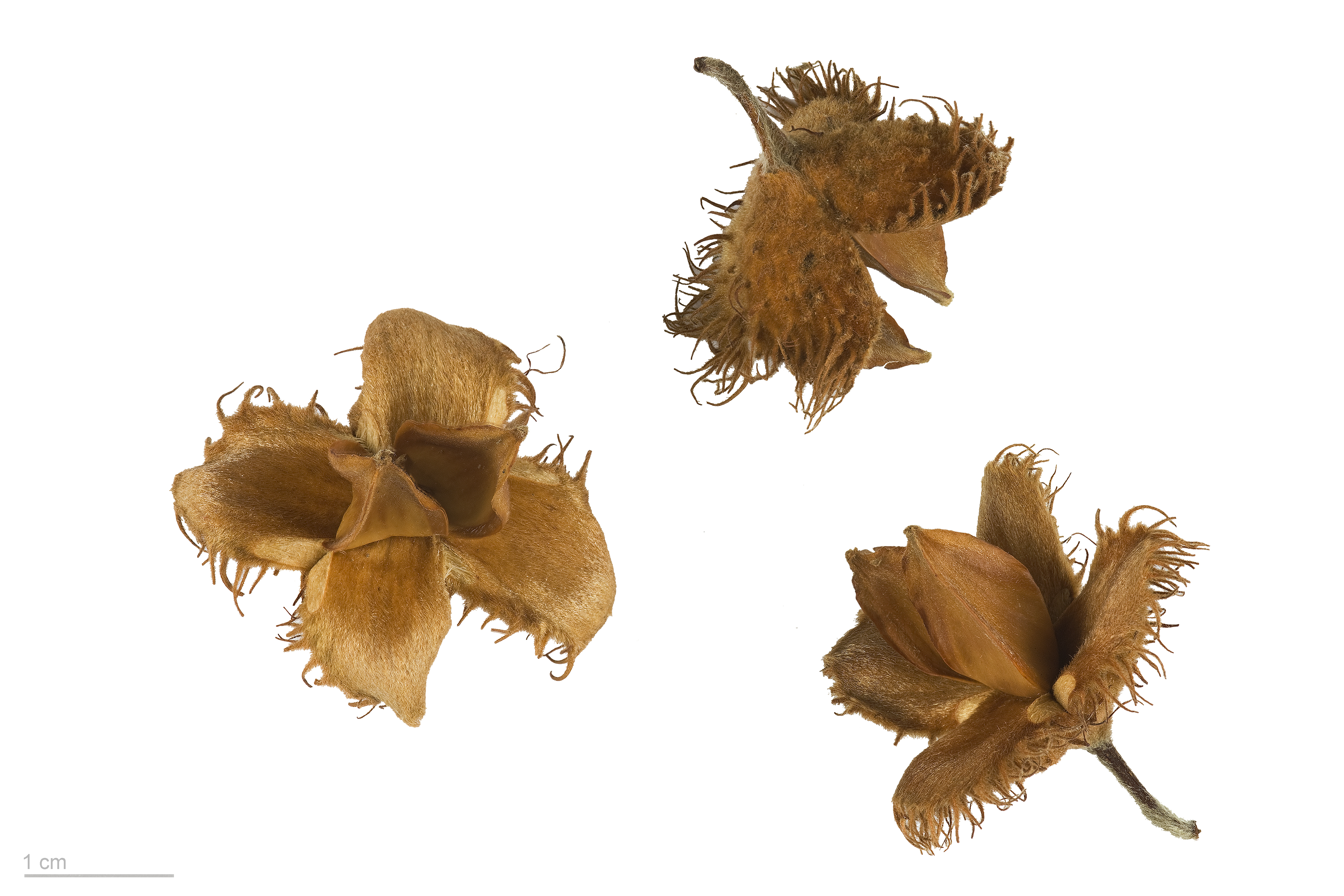
Fully opened fruits

== Evolution ==
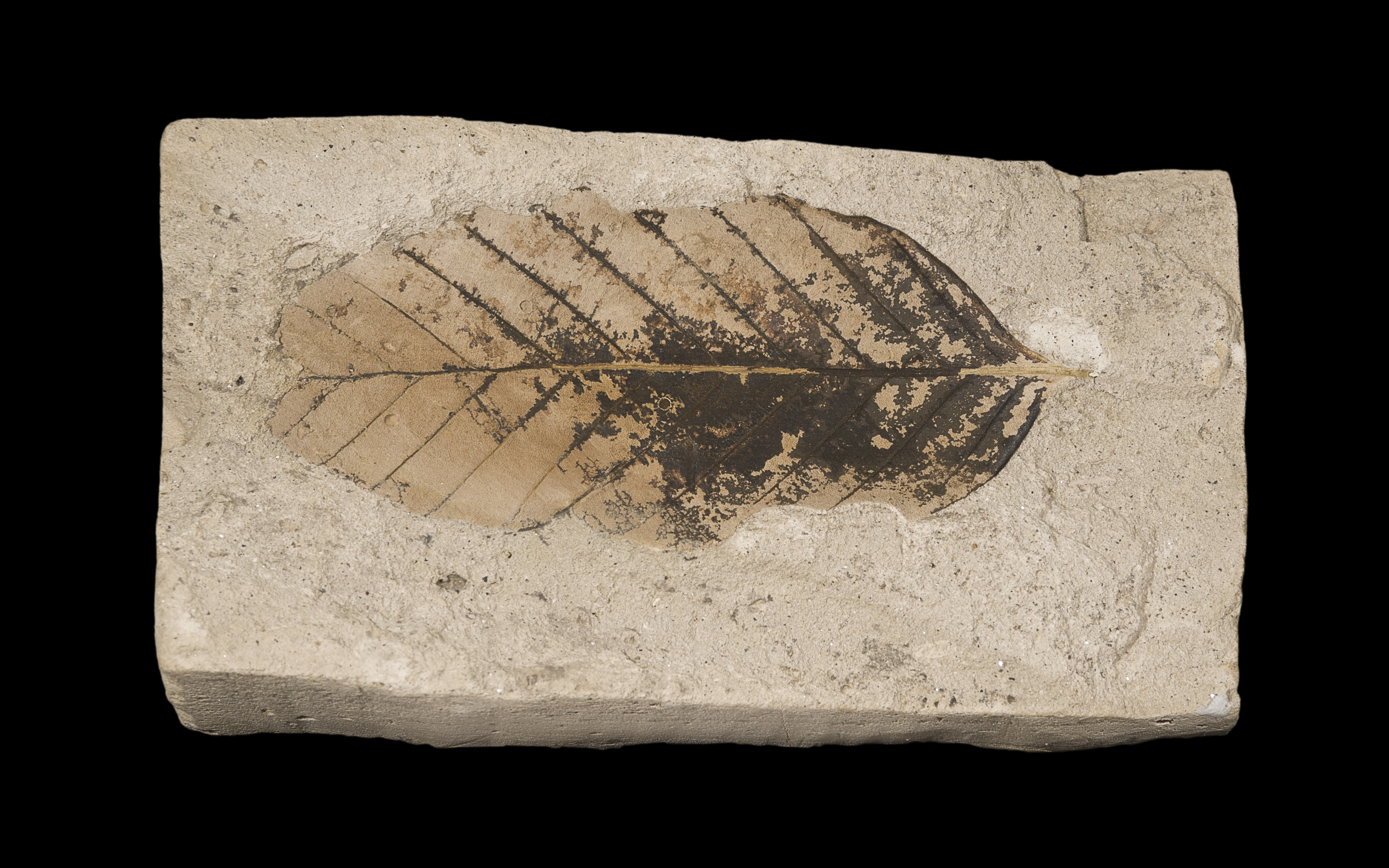
Piacenzian age fossil of Fagus sylvatica pliocenica

Fagus sylvatica was described by Carl Linnaeus in 1753, in his Species Plantarum.

The phylogenetic relationships of the extant beech species is shown below. The subgenera Engleriana and Fagus diverged from each other in the Early Oligocene era, 32.1 to 33.4 million years ago.

- Fagus
  - subg. Engleriana Japan, Korea
    - F. multinervis
    - - F. engleriana
      - F. japonica
  - subg. Fagus
    - sect. Grandifolia Eastern US
      - F. grandifolia
      - F. mexicana
    - - sect. Fagus Europe
        - F. orientalis
        - F. sylvatica
      - sect. Lucida Southeast Asia
        - F. hayatae
        - - F. crenata
          - - F. longipetiolata
            - F. lucida

== Distribution and habitat ==
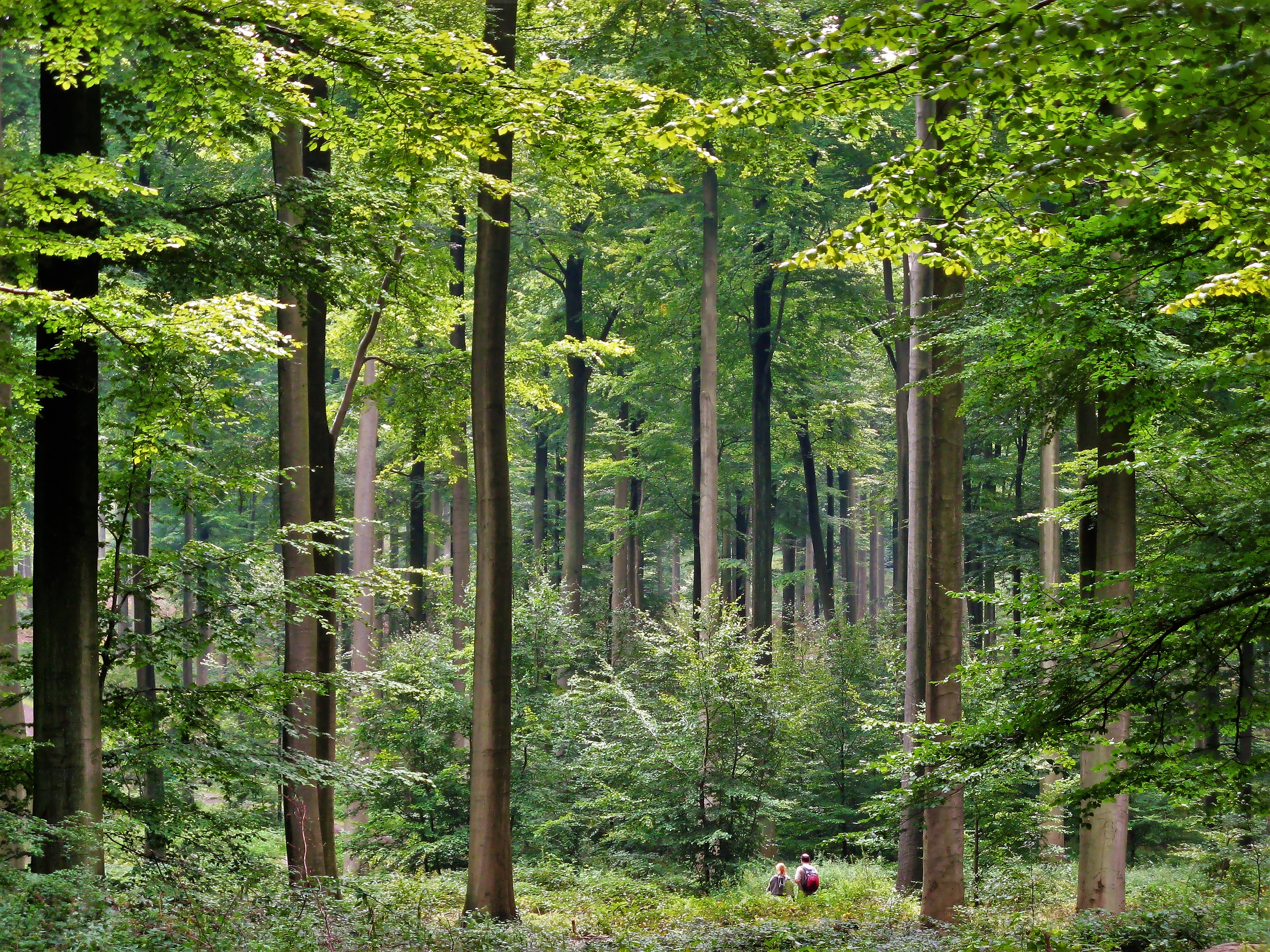
Old stand of beech with young undergrowth; Sonian Forest, Belgium

The European beech is the most abundant hardwood species in Austrian, German and Swiss forests. The native range extends from the north, in Sweden, Denmark, Norway, Germany, Poland, Switzerland, Bulgaria, western Ukraine, and Romania, through Europe to France, southern England, Spain (on the Cantabrian, Iberian and Central mountain ranges), Italy, and east to northwest Turkey, where it exhibits an interspecific cline with the oriental beech (Fagus orientalis), which replaces it further east. In the Balkans, it shows some hybridisation with oriental beech; these hybrid trees are named Fagus × taurica Popl. [Fagus moesiaca (Domin, Maly) Czecz.]. In the southern part of its range around the Mediterranean and Sicily, it grows only in mountain forests, at 600–1,800 m (1,969–5,906 ft) altitude.

Although often regarded as native in southern England, recent evidence suggests that F. sylvatica did not arrive in England until about 4000 BCE, or 2,000 years subsequent to the English Channel forming following the ice ages; it could have been an early introduction by Stone Age humans, who used the nuts for food. The beech is classified as a native in the south of England and as a non-native in the north where it is often removed from 'native' woods. Localised pollen records have been recorded in the North of England from the Iron Age by Sir Harry Godwin. Changing climatic conditions may put beech populations in southern England under increased stress and while it may not be possible to maintain the current levels of beech in some sites it is thought that conditions for beech in north-west England will remain favourable or even improve. It is often planted in Britain. Similarly, the nature of Norwegian beech populations is subject to debate. If native, they would represent the northern range of the species, although molecular genetic analyses imply that these populations represent intentional introduction from Denmark before and during the Viking Age. The beech in Vestfold and at Seim north of Bergen in Norway is now spreading naturally and regarded as native.

The European beech tolerates a variety of soil types, but requires a humid atmosphere (with precipitation well distributed throughout the year) and well-drained soil. It prefers moderately fertile ground, calcified or lightly acidic, so it is found more often on the side of a hill than at the bottom of clayey basin. It tolerates rigorous winter cold, but is sensitive to spring frost. In Norway's oceanic climate planted trees grow well north to Bodø Municipality, and produce seedlings and can spread naturally in Trondheim. In Sweden, beech trees do not grow as far north as in Norway.

In the woodlands of southern Britain, beech is dominant over oak and elm south of a line from about north Suffolk across to Cardigan. Oak are the dominant forest trees north of this line. One of the most beautiful European beech forests called Sonian Forest (Forêt de Soignes/Zoniënwoud) is found in the southeast of Brussels, Belgium. Beech is a dominant tree species in France and constitutes about 10% of French forests. The largest virgin forests made of beech trees are Uholka-Shyrokyi Luh (8,800 hectares or 22,000 acres) in Ukraine and Izvoarele Nerei (5,012 ha or 12,380 acres in one forest body) in Semenic-Cheile Carașului National Park, Romania. These habitats are the home of Europe's largest predators, the brown bear, the grey wolf, and the lynx. Many trees are older than 350 years in Izvoarele Nerei and even 500 years in Uholka-Shyrokyi Luh.

== Ecology ==
=== Symbioses ===
The root system is shallow, even superficial, with large roots spreading out in all directions. European beech forms ectomycorrhizas with a range of fungi including many Russula species, as well as Laccaria amethystina, and with the species Ramaria flavosaponaria. Tomentella Pat. species and Cenococcum geophilum have been found in Danish and Spanish beech forests. These fungi are important in enhancing uptake of water and nutrients from the soil. The nuts are eaten by animals.

=== Diseases ===
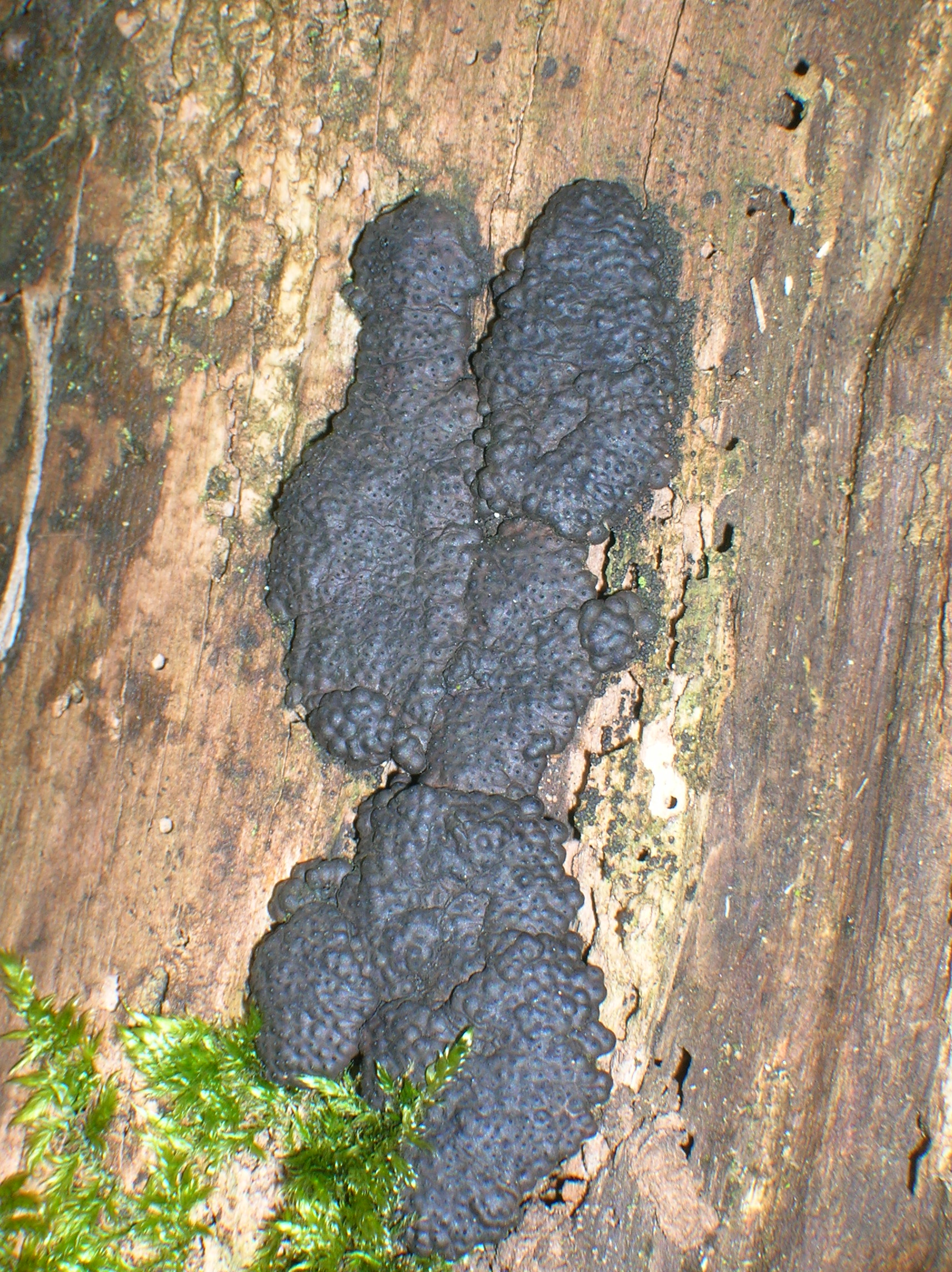
Beech tarcrust causes strip-canker and wood rot.

Fagus sylvatica and other beeches are prone to false heartwood ('red heart') a condition where drought, nutrient deficient soil, branch breakage, pathogen infestation or other stressor induces formation of protection wood. False heartwood often manifests in the areas of the trunk associated with symplastless branches. As branch symplast dies, the trunk wood becomes depleted of nitrogen-containing molecules essential for life; this increases risk of catastrophic trunk failure.

As the European beech exhibits deterministic leaf and shoot development and has a larger leaf area than other European hardwood trees, it is relatively more sensitive to drought and may respond to a dry summer with pre-senescent leafdrop.

Biscogniauxia nummularia (beech tarcrust) is an ascomycete primary pathogen of beech trees, causing strip-canker and wood rot. It can be found at all times of year and is not edible.

== Cultivation ==
European beech is a popular ornamental tree in parks and large gardens in temperate regions of the world. In North America, it is preferred for this purpose over the native Fagus grandifolia, which despite its tolerance of warmer climates, is slower growing, taking an average of 10 years longer to attain maturity. The town of Brookline, Massachusetts has one of the largest, if not the largest, grove of European beech trees in the United States. The 2.5-acre (1 ha) public park, called 'The Longwood Mall', was planted sometime before 1850, qualifying it as the oldest stand of European beeches in the U.S.

Since the early 19th century numerous cultivars of European beech have been made by horticultural selection, often repeatedly; they include:

- copper beech or purple beech (Fagus sylvatica purpurea) – a mutation of the European beech which was first noted in 1690 in the "Possenwald" forest near the town of Sondershausen in Thuringia, Germany. It is assumed that about 99% of all copper beeches in the world are descendants of this copper beech. Its leaves are purple, often turning deep spinach green by mid-summer. In the United States Charles Sprague Sargent noted the earliest appearance in a nurseryman's catalogue in 1820, but in 1859 "the finest copper beech in America... more than fifty feet high" was noted in the grounds of Thomas Ash, Esq., Throggs Neck, New York; it must have been more than forty years old at the time.
- fern-leaf beech (Fagus sylvatica Heterophylla Group) – leaves deeply serrated to thread-like
- dwarf beech (Fagus sylvatica Tortuosa Group) – distinctive twisted trunk and branches
- weeping beech (Fagus sylvatica Pendula Group) – branches pendulous
- Dawyck beech (Fagus sylvatica 'Dawyck') – fastigiate (columnar) growth – occurs in green, gold and purple forms; named after Dawyck Botanic Garden in the Scottish Borders
- golden beech (Fagus sylvatica 'Zlatia') – leaves golden in spring
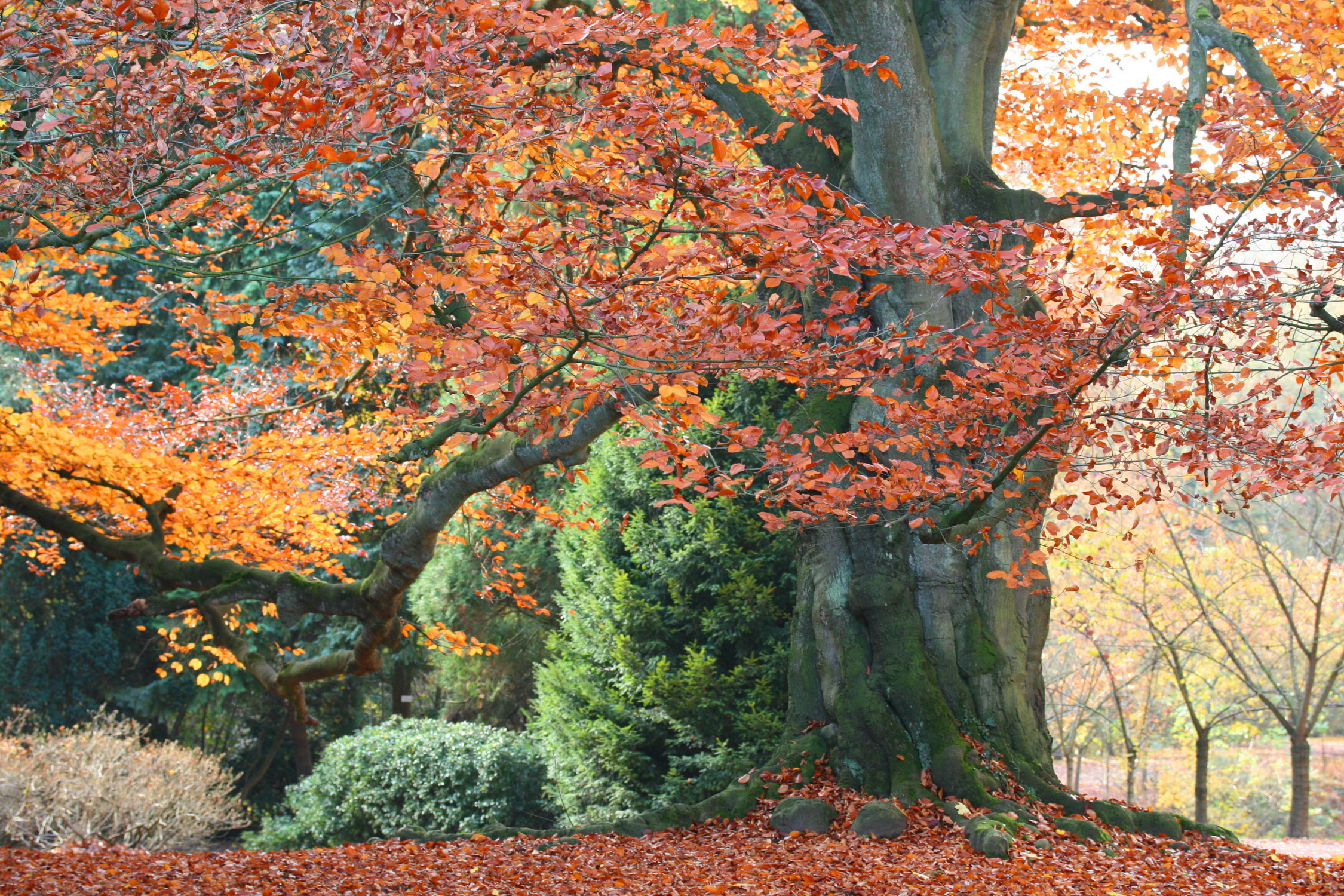
Copper beech, an ornamental cultivar, in autumn

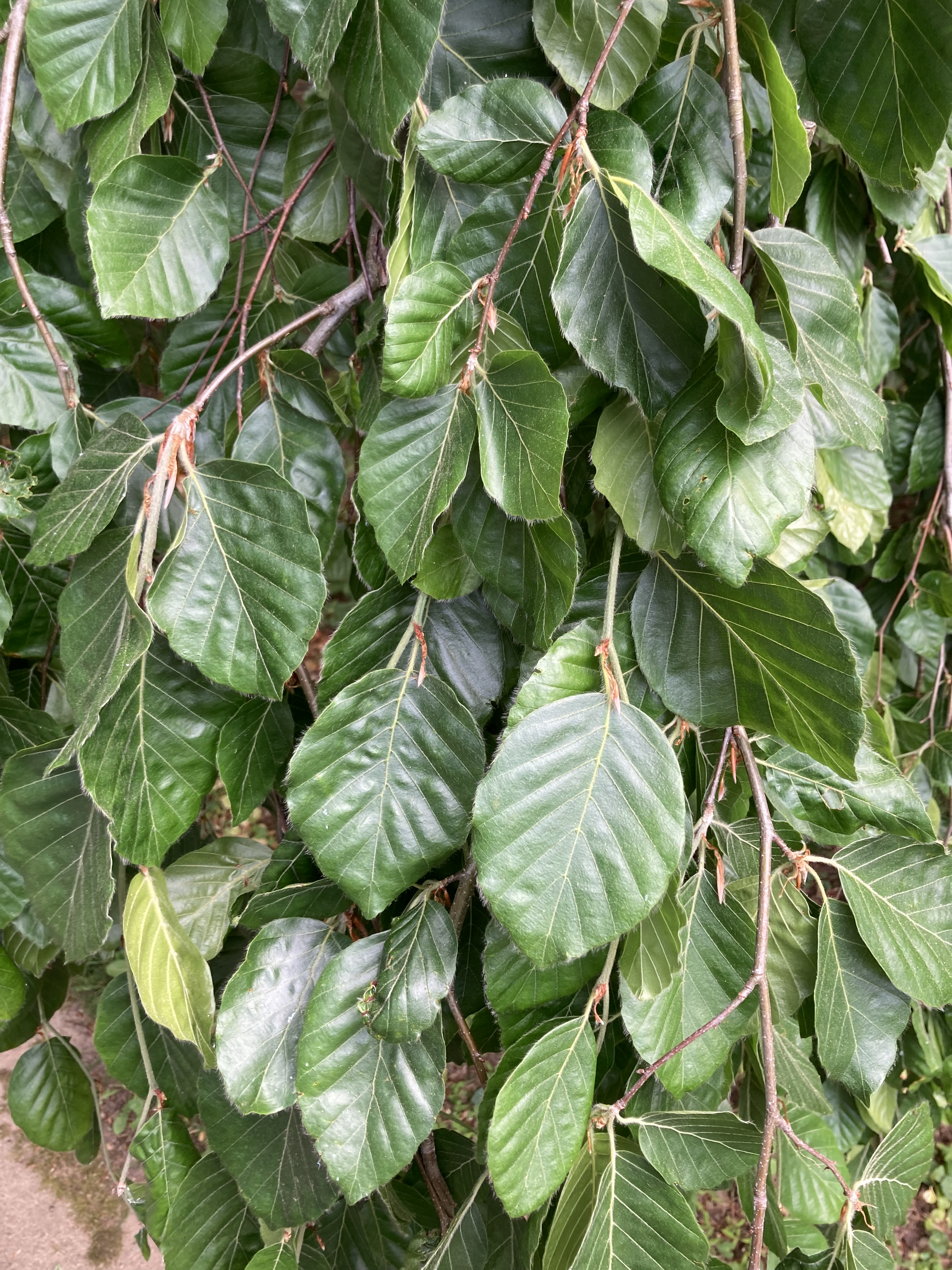
Leaves of a weeping cultivar of European beech

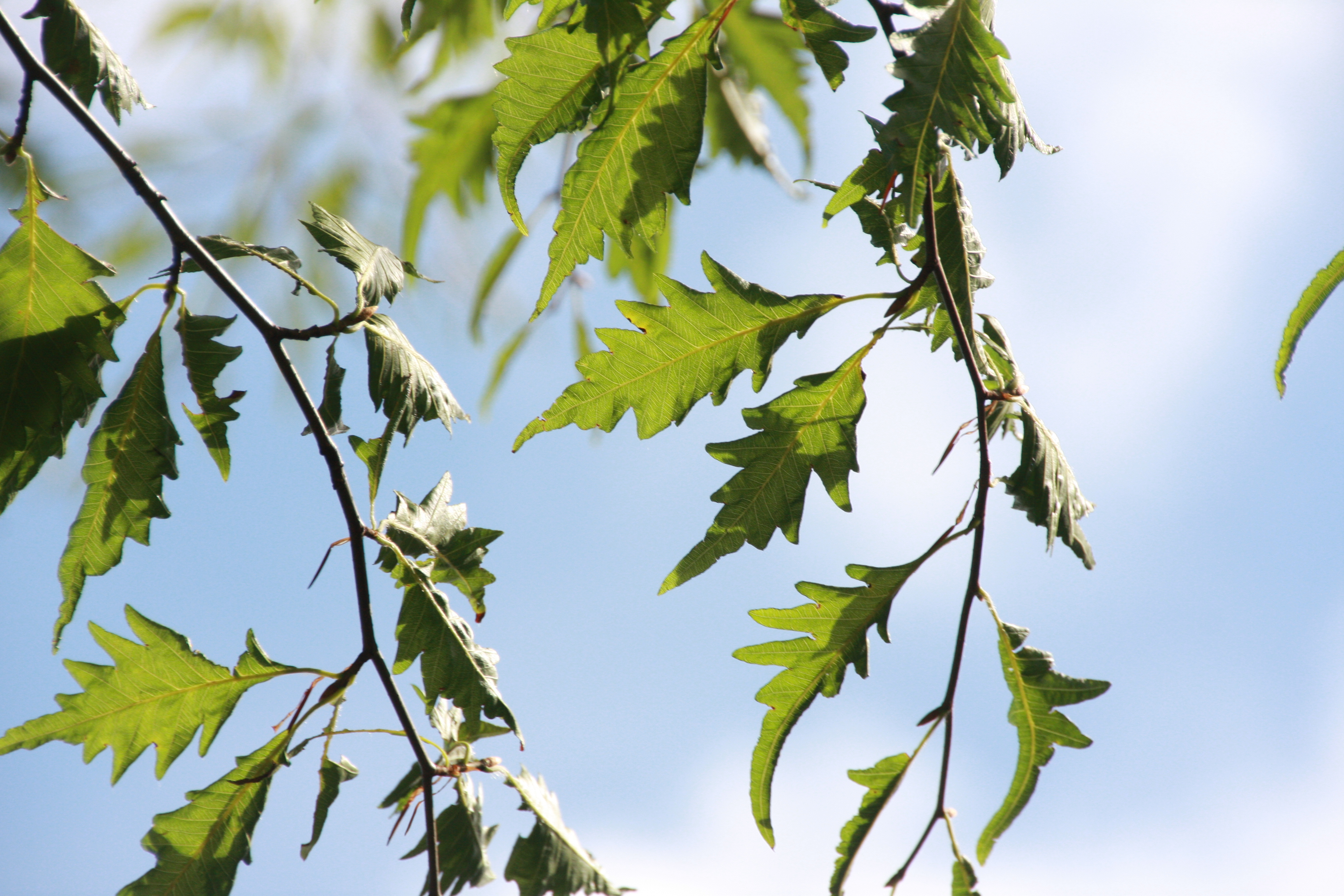
Leaves of var. heterophylla 'Aspleniifolia', Belfast Botanic Garden

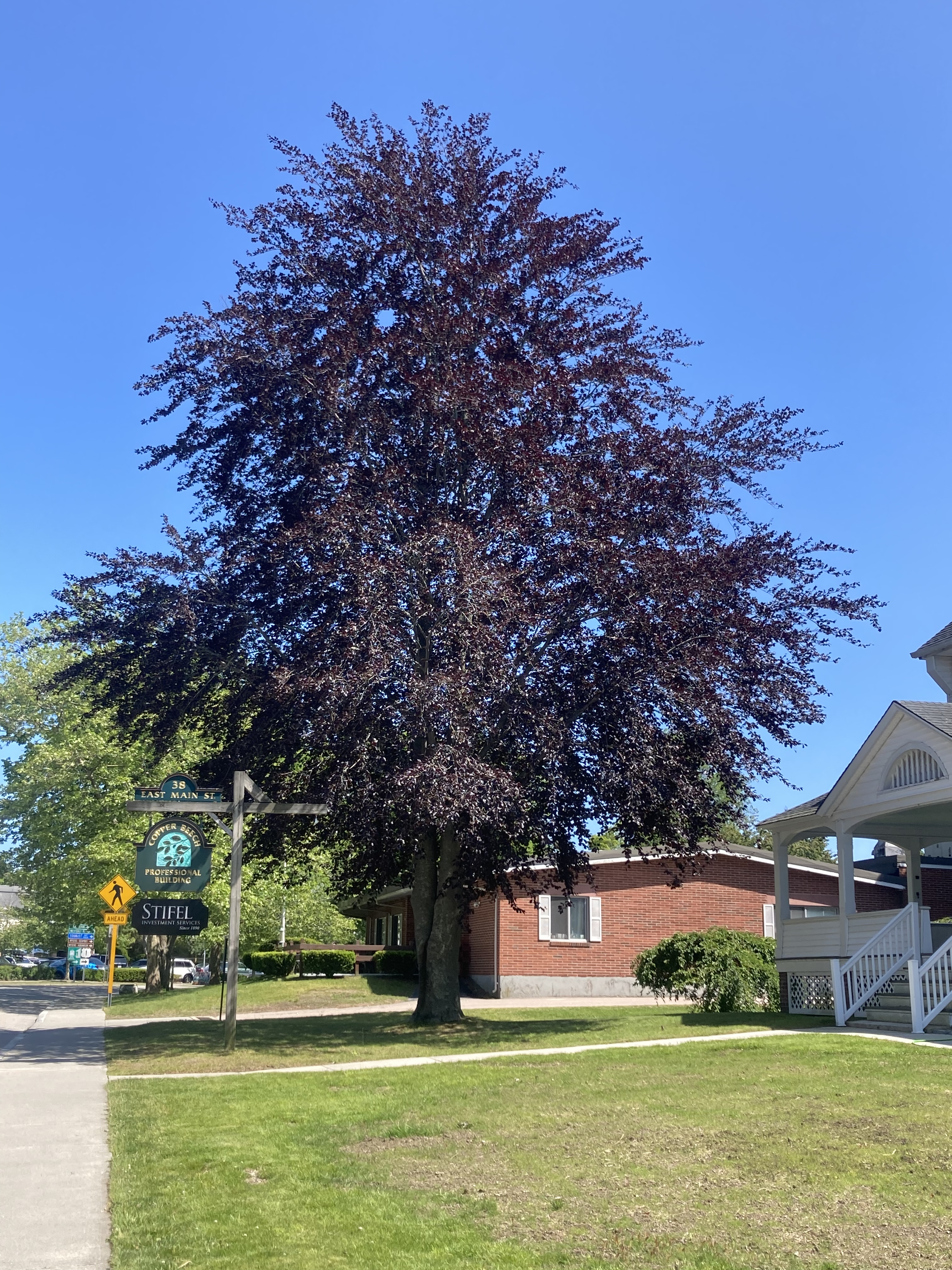
A dark purple copper beech in Mystic, Connecticut

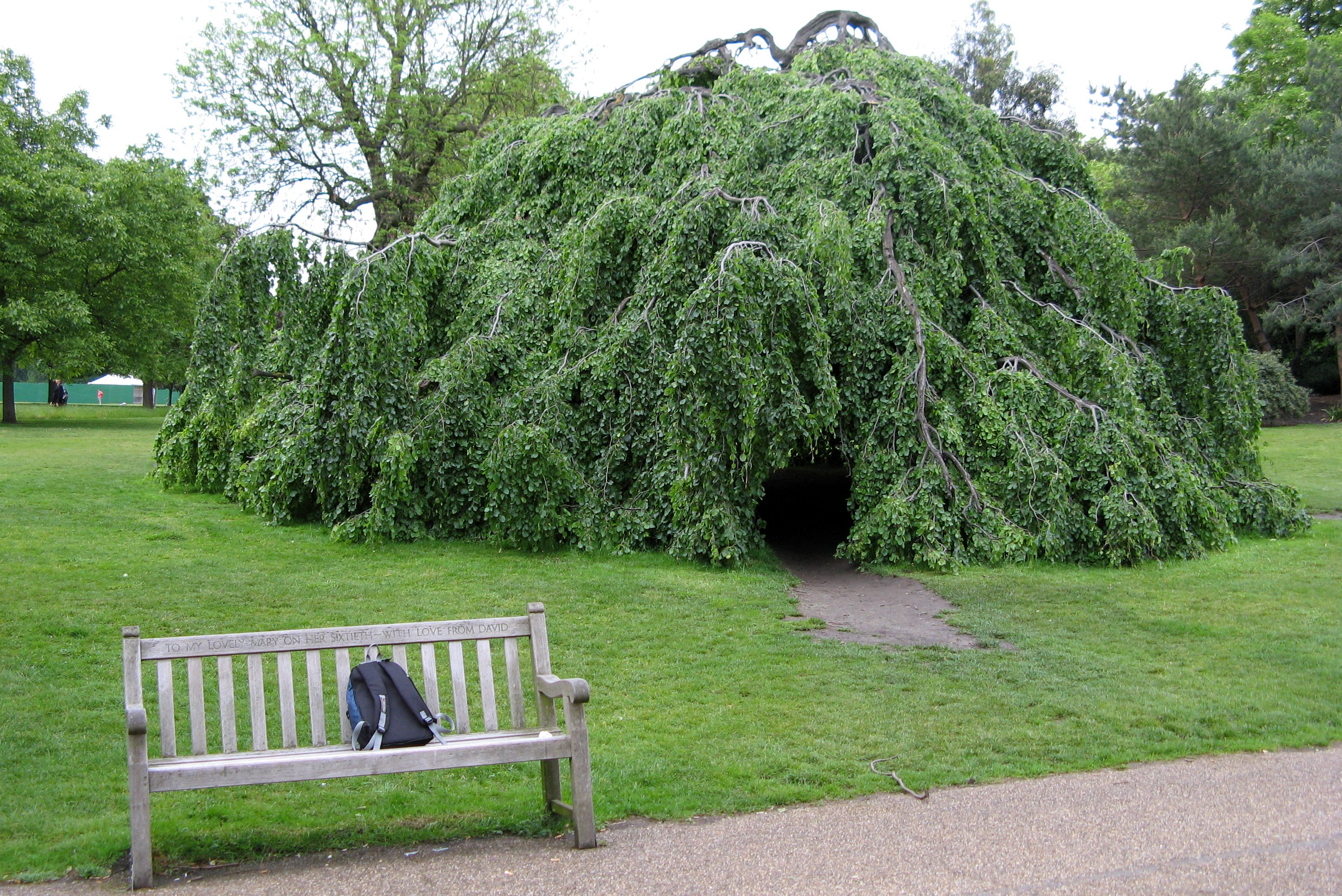
The famous Upside-down Tree, Hyde Park, London, an example of F. sylvatica 'pendula'

=== Cultivars ===
The following cultivars have gained the Royal Horticultural Society's Award of Garden Merit:

- F. sylvatica
- 'Dawyck'
- 'Dawyck Gold'
- 'Dawyck Purple'
- 'Pendula' (weeping beech)
- 'Riversii'
- F. sylvatica var. heterophylla 'Aspleniifolia'

== Toxicity ==
Some people are allergic to the nuts, which are slightly toxic if eaten in large quantities due to the tannins and alkaloids they contain.

== Uses ==
=== Foods and flavourings ===
In moderate quantity, the nuts are edible for most people, though the kernels are more difficult to remove the shells than those of American beech. The nuts can be ground into flour after being salted and dried or soaked to leach out the tannins. Roasted beech nuts have also been used as a coffee substitute in Europe. In 19th-century England, the nuts were pressed to obtain an oil that was used for cooking and in lamps.

The leaf buds and leaves can be eaten raw when young and tender. A smoke flavouring is produced from the wood. The sawdust was once combined with flour in Norway and Sweden to make bread.

=== Timber ===
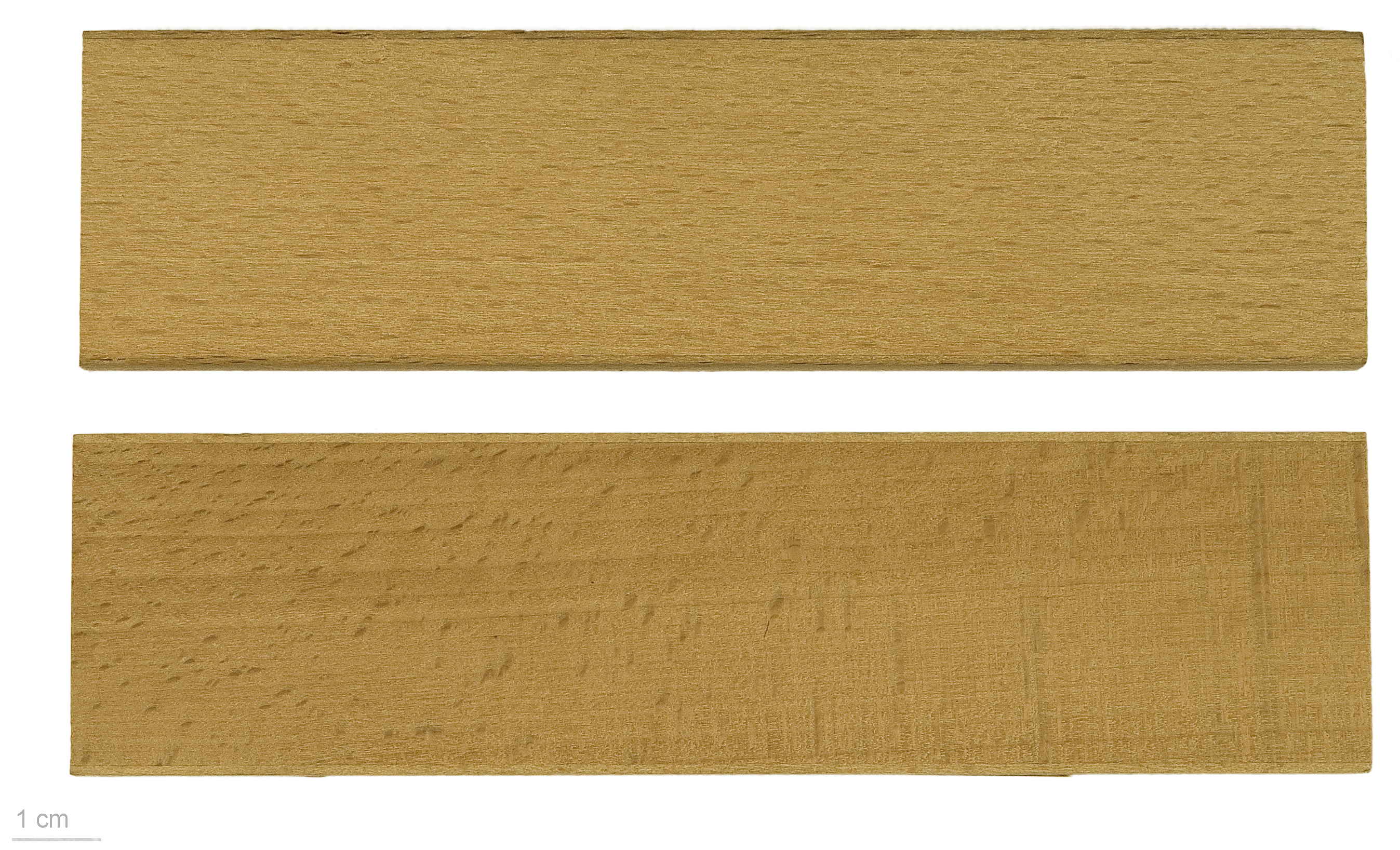
The wood

The timber of the European beech is used in the manufacture of numerous objects and implements. Its fine and short grain makes it an easy wood to work with, easy to soak, dye, varnish and glue. Steaming makes the wood even easier to machine. It has an excellent finish and is resistant to compression and splitting, and it is stiff when flexed. Milling is sometimes difficult due to cracking. The density of the wood is 720 kilograms (1,590 pounds) per cubic metre. It is particularly well suited for minor carpentry, particularly furniture. From chairs to parquetry (flooring) and staircases, the European beech can do almost anything other than heavy structural support, so long as it is not left outdoors. Its hardness make it ideal for making wooden mallets and workbench tops. The wood rots easily if it is not protected by a tar based on a distillate of its own bark (as used in railway sleepers). It is better for paper pulp than many other broadleaved trees though is only sometimes used for this, the high cellulose content can also be spun into modal, which is used as a textile akin to cotton. The code for its use in Europe is fasy (from FAgus SYlvatica). Common beech is also considered one of the best firewoods for fireplaces.

== In culture ==
In Gallo-Roman religion, Fagus (Latin for "beech") was a god known from four inscriptions found in the Hautes-Pyrénées.
