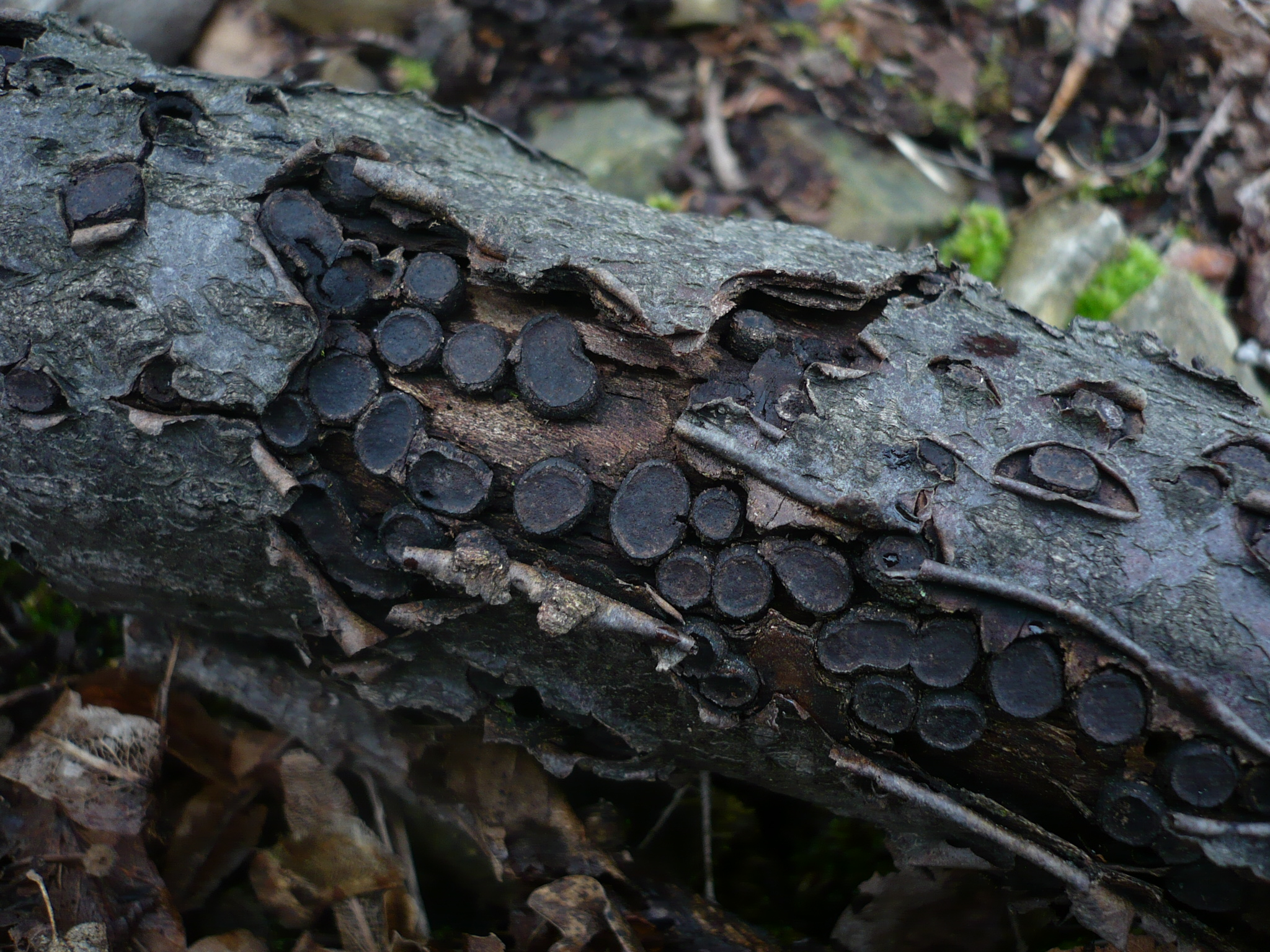

Scientific classification
- Kingdom: Fungi
- Division: Ascomycota
- Class: Sordariomycetes
- Order: Xylariales
- Family: Graphostromataceae
- Genus: Biscogniauxia
- Species: B. marginata

Binomial name
- Biscogniauxia marginata (Fr.) Pouzar (1979)

Synonyms
- Biscogniauxia discreta Diatrype discreta Hypoxylon discretum Hypoxylon marginatum Nummularia discreta Nummularia excavata Nummularia peziziformis Nummulariella marginata Numulariola discreta Sphaeria discreta Sphaeria excavata Sphaeria marginata

= Biscogniauxia marginata =

Species of fungus

Biscogniauxia marginata is a species of fungus in the family Graphostromataceae. A plant pathogen, it was given its current name by Czech mycologist Zdeněk Pouzar in 1979.
