= Camillea tinctor =

Scientific classification
- Kingdom: Fungi
- Division: Ascomycota
- Class: Sordariomycetes
- Order: Xylariales
- Family: Graphostromataceae
- Genus: Camillea
- Species: C. tinctor

Binomial name
- Camillea tinctor (Berk.) Læssøe, J.D.Rogers & Whalley (1989)

Synonyms
- Sphaeria tinctor Berk. (1845); Diatrype tinctor (Berk.) Sacc. (1882); Hypoxylon tinctor (Berk.) Cooke (1883); Nummularia tinctor (Berk.) Ellis & Everh. (1892); Valsa tinctor (Berk.) Kuntze (1898); Numulariola tinctor (Berk.) P.M.D.Martin (1969)

Species of fungus

Camillea tinctor is a species of fungus in the family Graphostromataceae. It is a plant pathogen and saprophyte of dying or weakened trees such as sycamore, oak, or elm. The fungus causes cankers on large branches or the tree trunk. Ascospores of this fungus are transported by wind or rain that can infect existing wounds in trees. It can be identified by orange staining that can be seen on cut wood, and it has protruding ostioles.

== Taxonomy ==
The fungus was originally described as Sphaeria tinctor by mycologist Miles Joseph Berkeley in 1845. Mordecai Cubitt Cooke moved it to genus Hypoxylon in 1883, and it was known as a member of this genus for a long time. The taxon was transferred to the genus Camillea in 1989.

== See also ==
- Hypoxylon canker of shade trees
