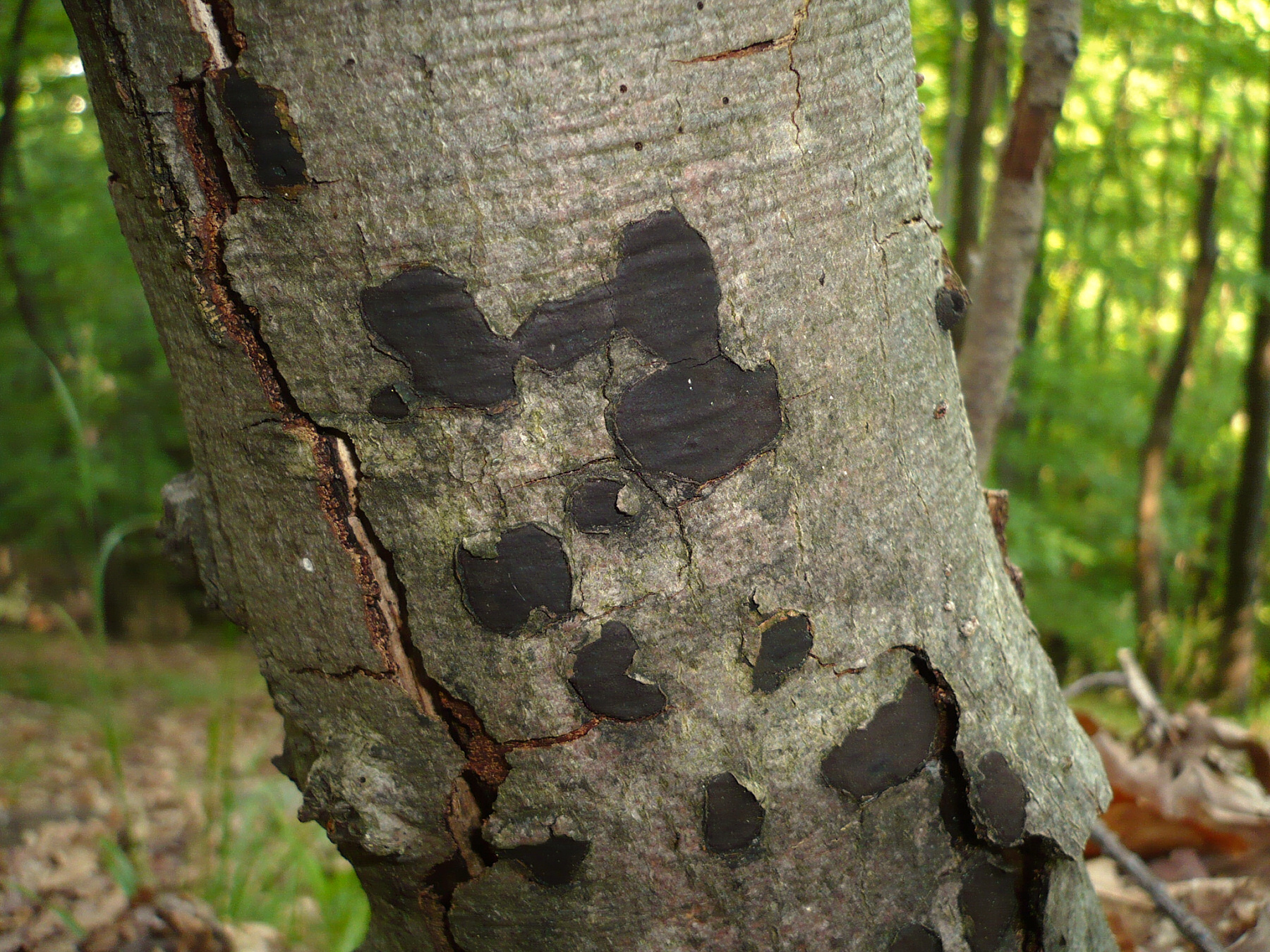
- Biscogniauxia nummularia

Scientific classification
- Kingdom: Fungi
- Division: Ascomycota
- Class: Sordariomycetes
- Order: Xylariales
- Family: Graphostromataceae
- Genus: Biscogniauxia; Kuntze (1891)

Type species
- Biscogniauxia nummularia (Bull.) Kuntze (1891)

Synonyms
- Kommamyce Nieuwl. (1916); Albocrustum McGinty (1925); Nummulariella Eckblad & Granmo 1978

= Biscogniauxia =

Genus of fungi

Biscogniauxia is a genus of fungi in the family Xylariaceae. Subtaxa include Biscogniauxia capnodes var. capnodes, Biscogniauxia marginata and Biscogniauxia nummularia, which are plant pathogens. The genus was circumscribed by Otto Kuntze in Revis. Gen. Pl. 2 on page 398 in 1891.

The genus name of Biscogniauxia is in honour of Célestin Alfred Cogniaux (1841 – 1916), a Belgian botanist.

== Species ==
- B. africana
- B. albosticta
- B. ambiens
- B. anceps
- B. arima
- B. atropunctata
- B. baileyi
- B. bartholomaei
- B. capnodes
- B. cinereolilacina
- B. citriformis
- B. communapertura
- B. cylindrispora
- B. dennisii
- B. divergens
- B. doidgeae
- B. formosana
- B. fuscella
- B. grenadensis
- B. kalchbrenneri
- B. kenyana
- B. latirima
- B. marginata
- B. mediterranea
- B. mucigera
- B. nawawii
- B. nothofagi
- B. nummularia
- B. pithodes
- B. plana
- B. plumbea
- B. querna
- B. repanda
- B. reticulospora
- B. schweinitzii
- B. simplicior
- B. sinuosa
- B. uniapiculata
- B. viscosicentra
- B. waitpela
- B. weldenii
- B. zelandica
