= Nummus =

Ancient Roman coin

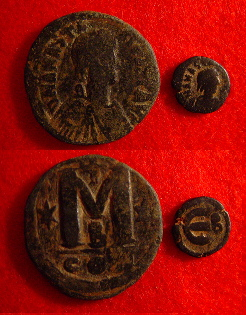
Nummi coins of the late reign of Anastasius I: on the left a 40-nummi coin (follis) and on the right a 5-nummi coin (pentanummium).

Nummus (pl. nummi) is a Latin word for various coins that was borrowed from Doric Greek noummos (νοῦμμος; Classical Greek: νόμος, nómos). Originally referring to a specific style of coin used in Greek-speaking Southern Italy, the term nummus came to be used by the Late Republic for all coins generally and particularly as a synonym for the sestertius, then the standard unit of Roman accounting, and then in Late Antiquity as the formal name of the follis. It was used in this general sense in Early Modern English but is most commonly employed by modern numismatists as a catchall term for various low-value copper coins issued by the Roman and Byzantine empires during Late Antiquity.

Forms of the term nummus also appear in various scientific names and in medical jargon for coin-shaped species, structures, and disorders.

== History ==
=== Southern Italian coin ===
This was a heavy silver nummus. These were generally used as the unit of local commerce. These were characterised by beautiful early 'incuse' designs.

=== Sestertius ===
Circa BC 211 the sestertius was introduced, a coin weighing around 1.125 grams with the value of a quarter of a denarius. Production stalled in around BC 44. Around BC 23 in the coinage reform of Augustus the sestertius became a large brass coin weighing around 27 grams and measuring about 33 mm in diameter.

=== Follis ===
Circa AD 294, during the Tetrarchy, a new large bronze coin of circa 10 grams weight and 30 mm diameter appeared. Its official name was apparently nummus, although it has until recently been known among numismatists as the follis.

=== Byzantine issues ===
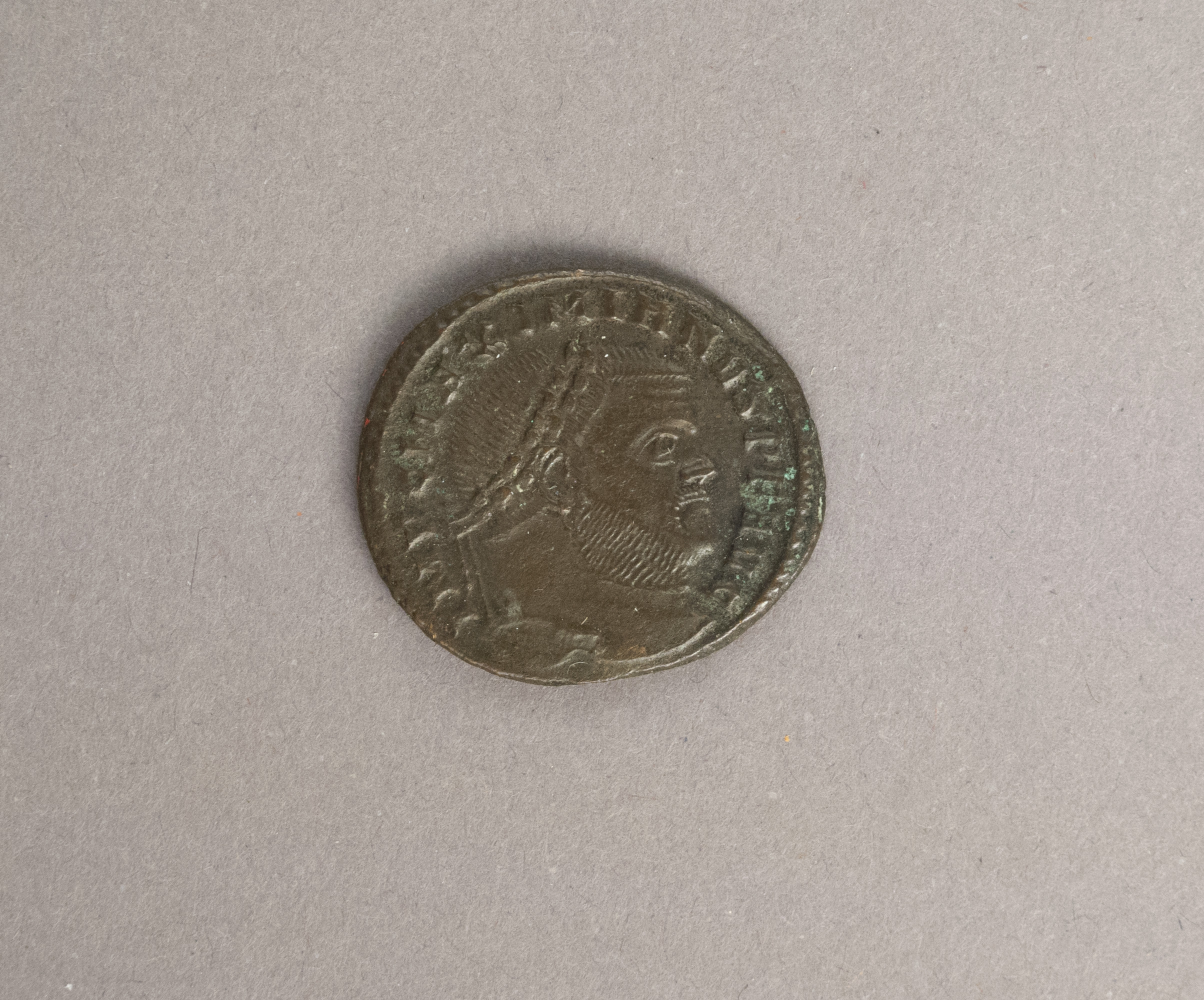
Nummus of AD 307–8

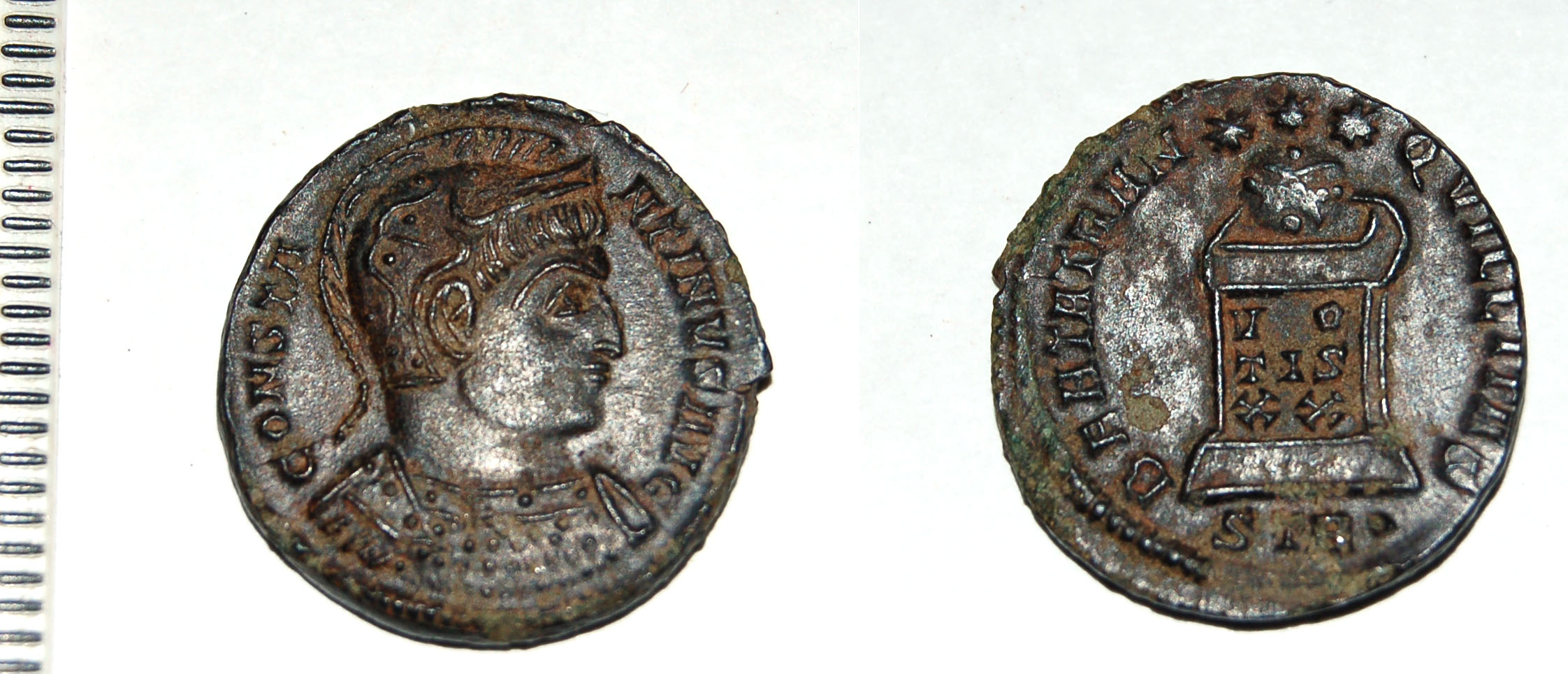
Nummus of AD 317–330

The term nummus is now usually applied solely to the 5th–7th century Byzantine issues. These were small, badly struck coins, weighing less than 1 gram, forming the lowest denomination of Byzantine coinage. They were valued officially at ^{1}/_{7,200} of the gold solidus but more usually rated to ^{1}/_{6,000} or ^{1}/_{12,000}. The nummus usually featured the profile of the reigning Byzantine emperor on the obverse and the Byzantine imperial monogram on the reverse, although some coins of Emperor Justinian I (r. 527–565) display its numerical value by the Greek numeral "A" instead.

In 498, Emperor Anastasius I (r. 491–518) reformed the coinage (carried out by the comes sacrarum largitionum John the Paphlagonian) by introducing multiples of the nummus, with denominations of 40 nummi, also known as a follis, 20 nummi (semifollis), 10 nummi (Greek: δεκανούμμιον, decanummium). These were also marked with Greek numerals representing their value: "M" for the follis, "K" for the semifollis and "I" for the decanummium. On the other hand, it appears that issue of the simple nummus was discontinued. In 513, the weights of these coins were doubled, the pentanummium (Greek: πεντανούμμιον, 5-nummi coin marked with "E") introduced, and the minting of single nummi resumed.

In 538–539, Emperor Justinian I introduced further changes to the 40-nummi follis, raising its weight to 25 grams. It was reduced again to 22.5 grams in 541/542, and further reductions followed until the century's end. At this time, a new 30-nummi coin (marked with "Λ" or "XXX") was introduced, but the single follis had ceased to be struck at Constantinople. It survived in the Exarchate of Carthage well into the 7th century however. During the 7th century, the successive military and financial crises led to further reduction in the weight and a marked deterioration of the quality of bronze coinage; by the time of Emperor Constans II (r. 641–668), a follis weighed only 3 grams. Consequently, the denominations lower than the semifollis were practically unmintable and abandoned. Thereafter, the term nummus remained in use as a notional unit for ^{1}/_{6,000} of the solidus, and in colloquial usage for "small change".

== Other uses ==
Forms of the term nummus also appear in medical jargon and various scientific names to describe coin-shaped species, structures, and disorders:

- Arctostaphylos nummularia
- Atriplex nummularia
- Biscogniauxia nummularia
- Bulbophyllum nummularioides
- Capparis spinosa subsp. nummularia
- Correa reflexa var. nummulariifolia
- Dorstenia nummularia
- Eriogonum nummulare
- Helianthemum nummularium
- Lysimachia nummularia
- Nummular dermatitis
- Nummulite
- Pilea nummulariifolia
- Ziziphus nummularia
