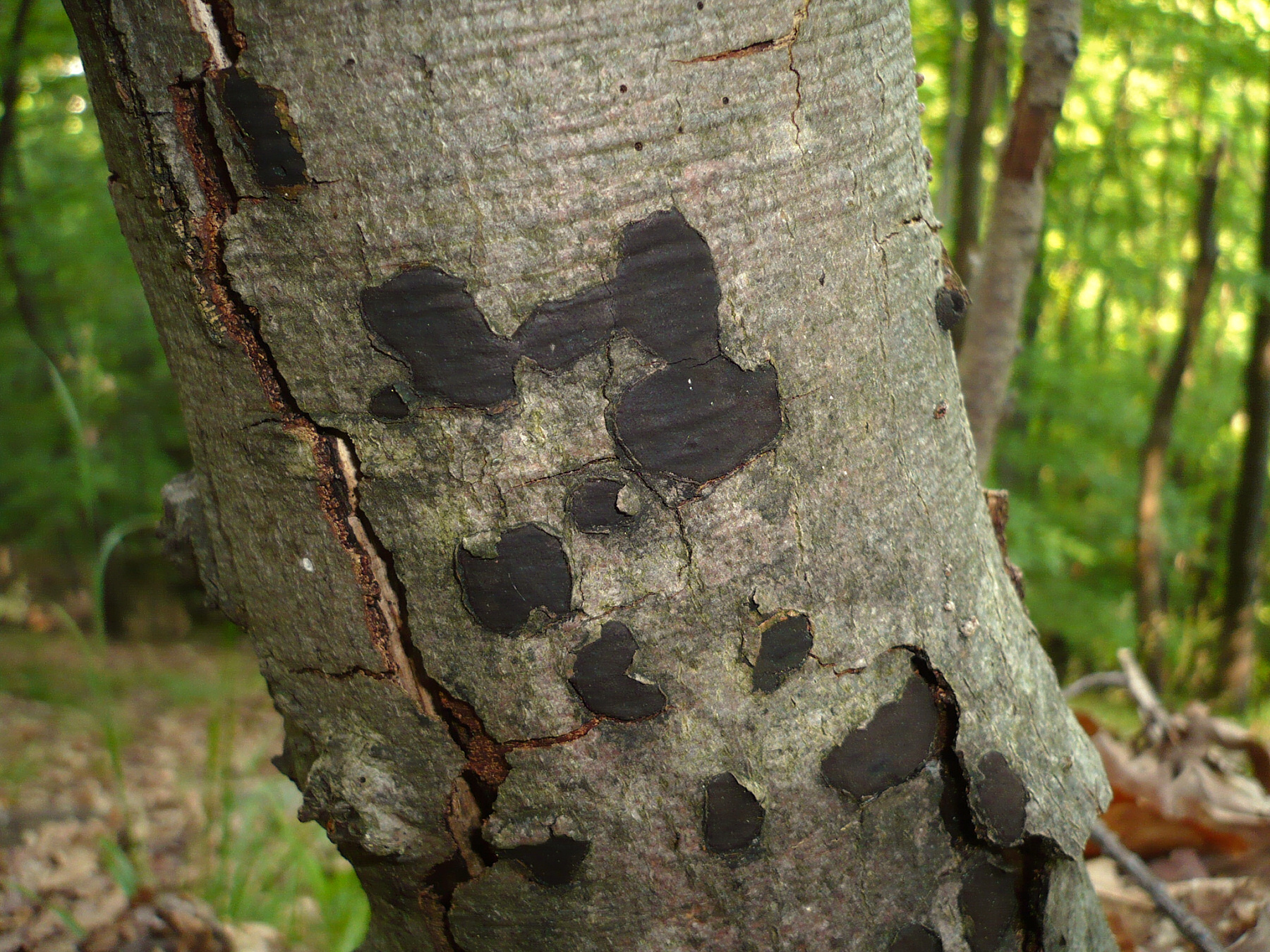

Scientific classification
- Kingdom: Fungi
- Division: Ascomycota
- Class: Sordariomycetes
- Order: Xylariales
- Family: Graphostromataceae
- Genus: Biscogniauxia
- Species: B. nummularia

Binomial name
- Biscogniauxia nummularia (Bull.) Kuntze (1891)

Synonyms
- Biscogniauxia bulliardii (Tul. & C.Tul.) Kuntze; Hypoxylon nummularium Bull. (1790); Hypoxylon nummularium var. nummularium Bull.; Kommamyce bulliardii (Tul. & C.Tul.) Nieuwl.; Nummularia anthracina (J.C.Schmidt) Traverso; Nummularia bulliardii Tul. & C.Tul.; Nummularia nummularia (Bull.) J.Schröt.; Numulariola nummularia (Bull.) House; Sphaeria anthracina J.C.Schmidt; Sphaeria nummularia DC.

= Biscogniauxia nummularia =

Species of fungus

Biscogniauxia nummularia is a plant pathogen in the family Graphostromataceae, known as the beech tarcrust. The specific epithet is derived from the Latin "nummus" meaning a coin, referring to the often rounded and coin-like encrustations.

== Description ==
The fruit body forms a thick and shiny black crust, on beech (Fagus) bark and is found at all times of the year. It is not edible. Young specimens are covered by a light brown outer layer. The spores are black to dark brown.

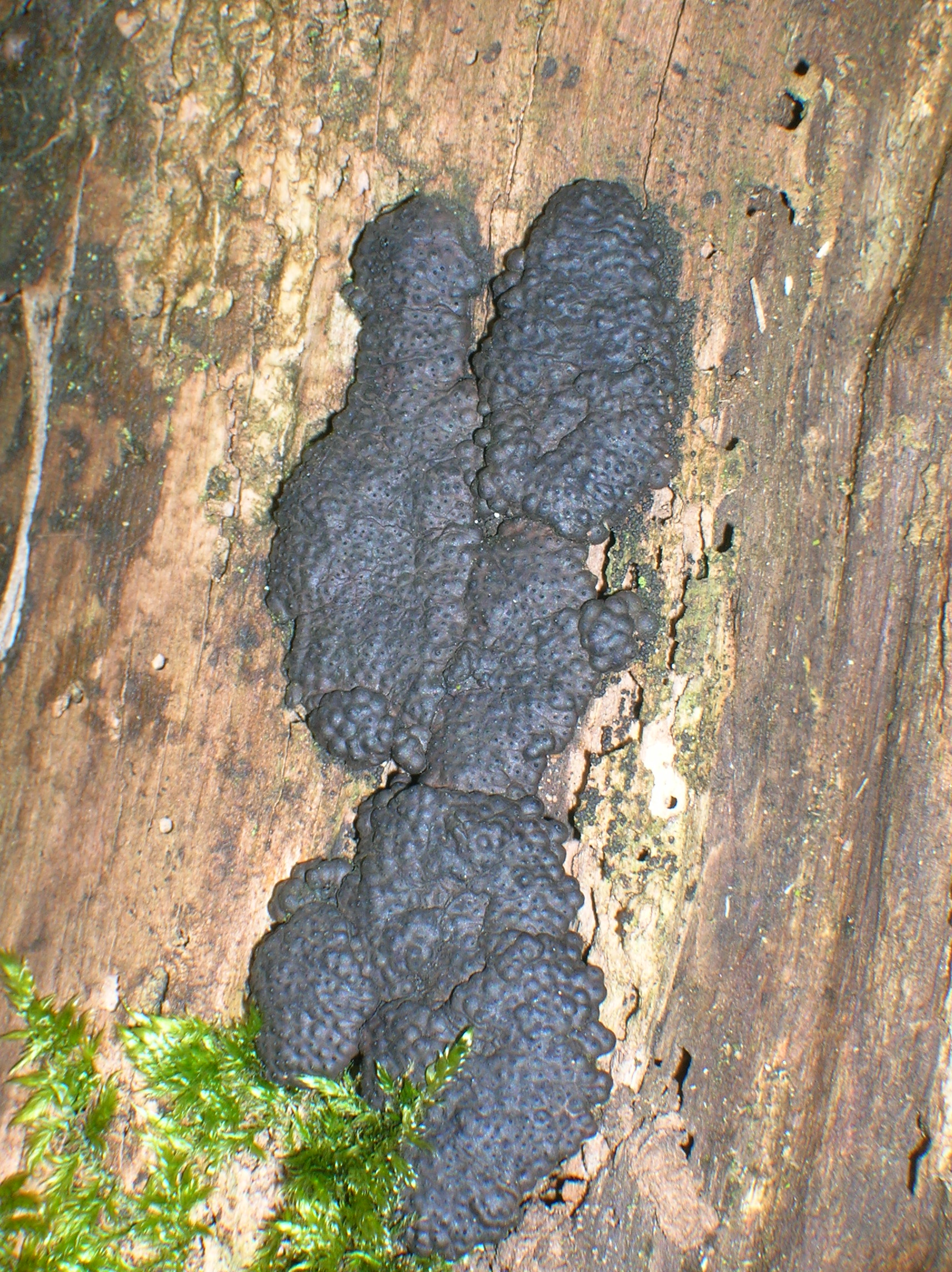
Detail of the tarcrust's structure

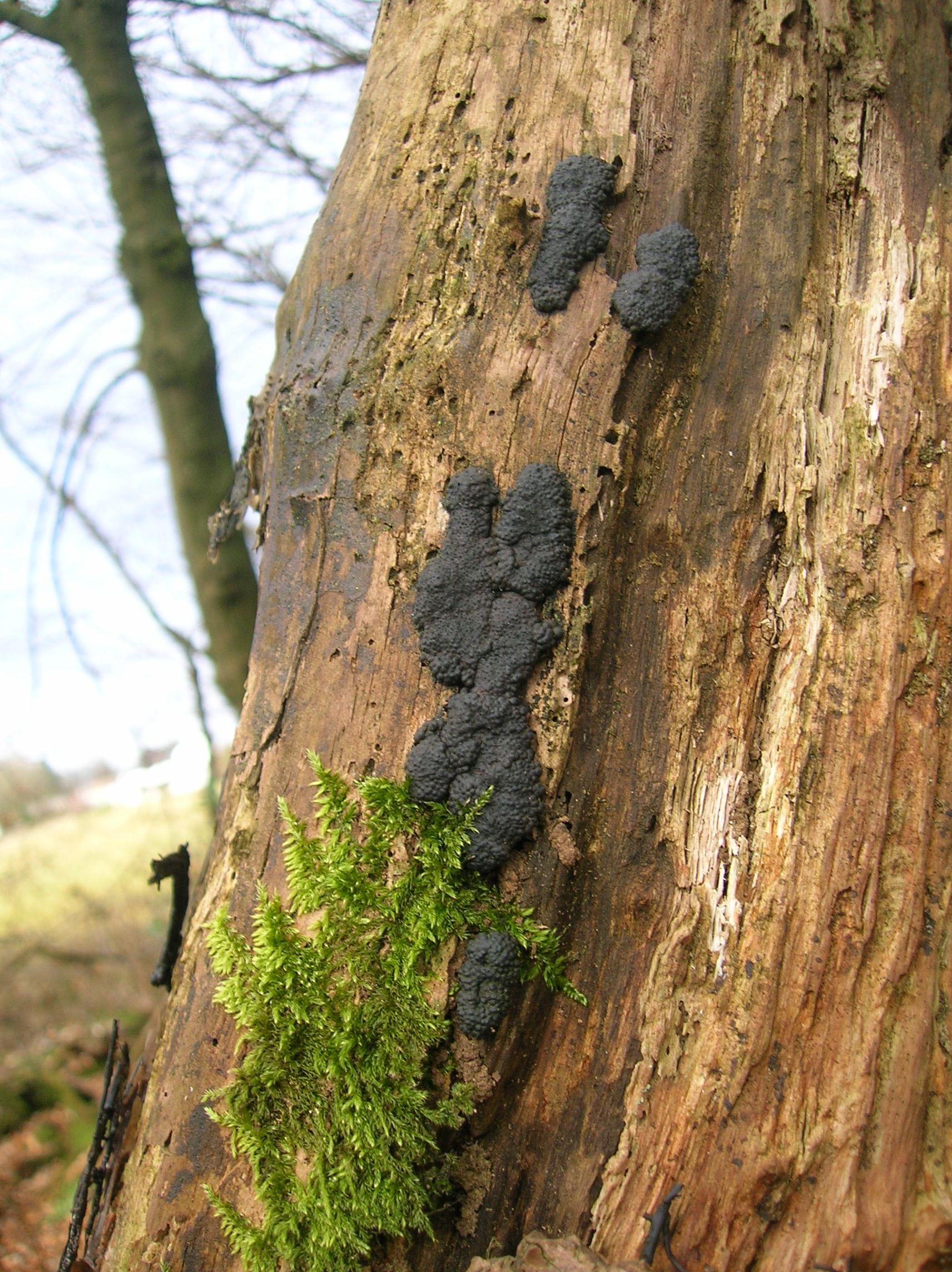
Beech tarcrust growth

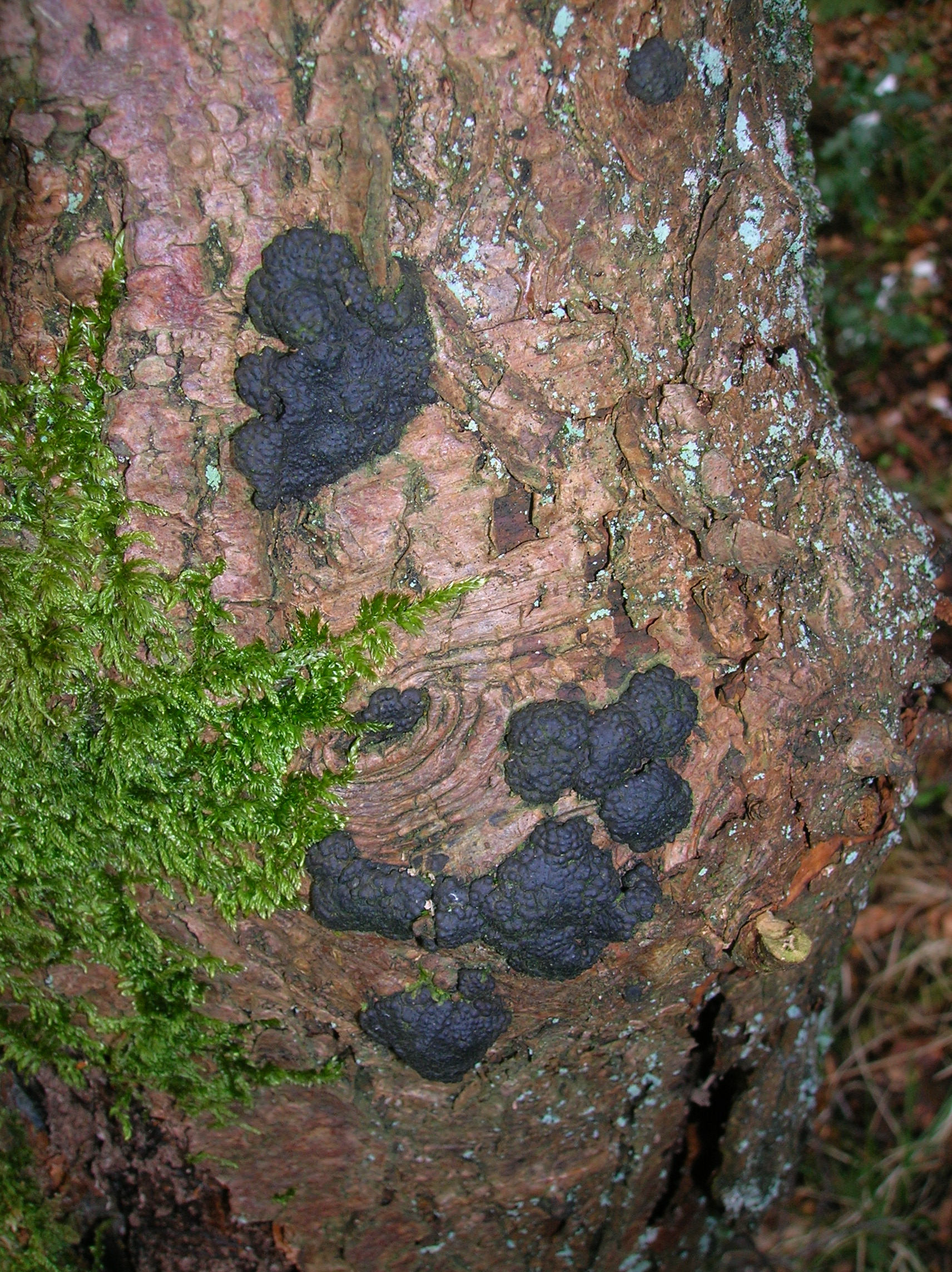
Encrustations on beech bark

== Distribution ==
Biscogniauxia nummularia is a common pathogen specific for Beech trees, and has been recorded throughout Europe and Russia.

== Environmental impact ==
The decline of European beech (Fagus sylvatica) in Sicily and Calabria (Italy) has been linked to B. nummularia and experiments have suggested that this ascomycete plays a primary pathogenic role under certain environmental conditions. It typically causes strip-cankering and general wood decay.
