= Theissenia =

Scientific classification
- Kingdom: Fungi
- Division: Ascomycota
- Class: Sordariomycetes
- Order: Xylariales
- Family: Graphostromataceae
- Genus: Theissenia; Maubl.

Type species
- Theissenia pyrenocrata (Theiss.) Maubl.

Genus of fungi

Theissenia is a genus of fungi in the family Graphostromataceae.

The genus was circumscribed by André Maublanc in Bull. Soc. Mycol. France vol.30 on page 51 in 1914.

The genus name of Theissenia is in honour of Ferdinand Theissen (1877–1919), who was a German-Austrian Jesuit priest and mycologist.

== Species ==
As accepted by Species Fungorum;

- Theissenia cinerea Y.M. Ju, J.D. Rogers & H.M. Hsieh (2003)
- Theissenia pyrenocrata (Theiss.) Maubl. (1914)

Former species;

- T. eurima Y.M. Ju, J.D. Rogers & H.M. Hsieh (2003) = Durotheca eurima, Xylariaceae family
- T. rogersii Y.M. Ju & H.M. Hsieh (2007) = Durotheca rogersii, Xylariaceae
