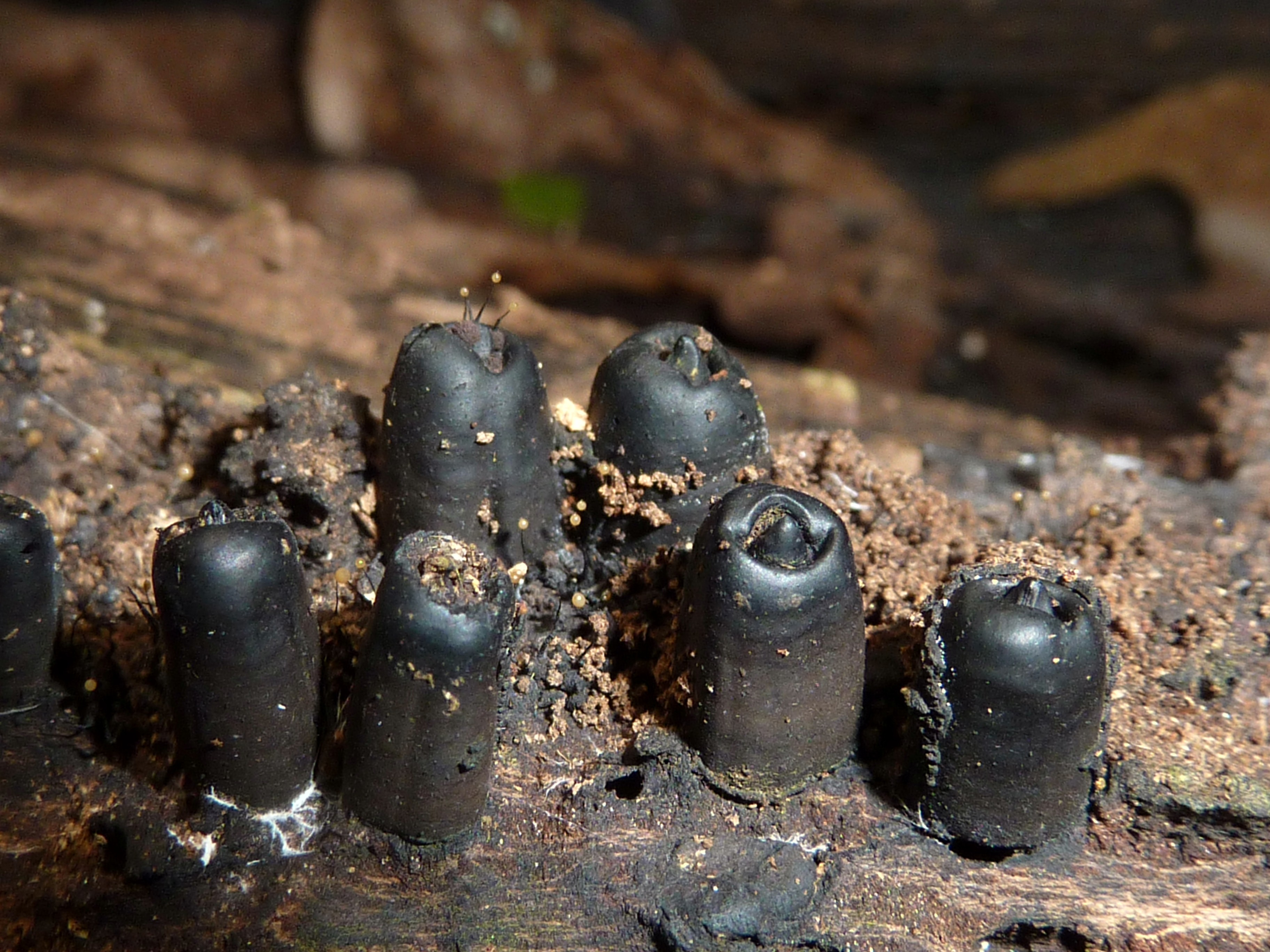
- Camillea mucronata

Scientific classification
- Domain: Eukaryota
- Kingdom: Fungi
- Division: Ascomycota
- Class: Sordariomycetes
- Order: Xylariales
- Family: Graphostromataceae
- Genus: Camillea; Fr. (1849)

Type species
- Camillea leprieurii Mont. (1849)

Synonyms
- Bacillaria Mont. (1840); Diatrype subgen. Nummularoidea Cooke & Massee (1892); Diatrypeopsis Speg. (1884); Jongiella M.Morelet (1971); Nummularioidea (Cooke & Massee) Lloyd (1924)

= Camillea =

Genus of fungi

Camillea is a genus of fungi in the family Graphostromataceae. Collectively, the 40+ species in the genus have a widespread distribution, but are especially prevalent in tropical areas. Fruit bodies of Camillea species tend to be cylindrical in shape. The genus was originally circumscribed by Swedish mycologist Elias Fries in his 1849 work Summa vegetabilium Scandinaviae.

== Species ==
As of June 2023, Species Fungorum (in the Catalogue of Life) accepts 45 species of Camillea.

- Camillea amazonica Læssøe, J.D.Rogers & Whalley (1989)
- Camillea bilabiata Speg. (1889)
- Camillea broomeana (Berk. & M.A.Curtis) Læssøe, J.D.Rogers & Whalley (1989)
- Camillea campinensis Viégas (1944)
- Camillea coroniformis J.D.Rogers, F.San Martín & Y.M.Ju (2002)
- Camillea cyclisca (Mont.) Læssøe, J.D.Rogers & Whalley (1989)
- Camillea deceptiva Læssøe, J.D.Rogers & Whalley (1989)
- Camillea flosculosa (Starbäck) Læssøe, J.D.Rogers & Whalley (1989)
- Camillea fossulata (Mont.) Læssøe, J.D.Rogers & Whalley (1989)
- Camillea fusiformis M.A.Whalley (1995)
- Camillea gigaspora (Massee) Læssøe, J.D.Rogers & Whalley (1989)
- Camillea guzmanii F.San Martín & J.D.Rogers (1993)
- Camillea hainesii (J.D.Rogers & Dumont) Læssøe, J.D.Rogers & Whalley (1989)
- Camillea heterostoma (Mont.) Læssøe, J.D.Rogers & Whalley (1989)
- Camillea hyalospora (Pat.) J.D.Rogers, Læssøe & Lodge (1991)
- Camillea labellum Mont. (1855)
- Camillea labiatirima J.D.Rogers, F. San Martín & Y.M. Ju (2002)
- Camillea leprieurii (Mont.) Mont. (1855)
- Camillea luzonensis Lloyd (1924)
- Camillea macromphala (Mont.) Cooke (1884)
- Camillea macrospora (J.H.Mill.) Hastrup & Læssøe (2009)
- Camillea magnifica F.San Martín & J.D.Rogers (1993)
- Camillea malaysiensis M.A.Whalley (1999)
- Camillea mexicana F.San Martín & J.D.Rogers (1993)
- Camillea mucronata Mont. (1855)
- Camillea obularia (Fr.) Læssøe, J.D.Rogers & Lodge (1991)
- Camillea oligoporus Læssøe, J.D.Rogers & Whalley (1989)
- Camillea ovalispora Hastrup & Læssøe (2009)
- Camillea patouillardii Læssøe, J.D.Rogers & Whalley (1989)
- Camillea pila Lloyd (1924)
- Camillea punctidisca (J.D.Rogers) Læssøe, J.D.Rogers & Whalley (1989)
- Camillea punctulata (Berk. & Ravenel) Læssøe, J.D.Rogers & Whalley (1989)
- Camillea sagrana (Mont.) Berk. & M.A.Curtis (1854)
- Camillea scriblita (Mont.) Læssøe, J.D.Rogers & Whalley (1989)
- Camillea selangorensis M.A.Whalley, Whalley & E.B.G.Jones (1996)
- Camillea signata (S.C.Jong & C.R.Benj.) Læssøe, J.D.Rogers & Whalley (1989)
- Camillea stellata Læssøe, J.D.Rogers & Whalley (1989)
- Camillea texensis J.D.Rogers & Lar.N.Vassiljeva (2008)
- Camillea tinctor (Berk.) Læssøe, J.D.Rogers & Whalley (1989)
- Camillea unistoma Hastrup & Læssøe (2009)
- Camillea venezuelensis (J.H.Mill.) Dennis (1970)
- Camillea verruculospora J.D.Rogers, Læssøe & Lodge (1991)
- Camillea williamsii Lloyd (1924)
