= Graphostromataceae =

Scientific classification
- Kingdom: Fungi
- Division: Ascomycota
- Class: Sordariomycetes
- Order: Xylariales
- Family: Graphostromataceae; M.E. Barr, J.D. Rogers & Y.M. Ju

Type genus
- Graphostroma Piroz

Type species
- Graphostroma platystoma Piroz

Family of fungi

The Graphostromataceae are a family of fungi in the order Xylariales. This was a monotypic family, containing the single genus Graphostroma, which in turn contains the single species Graphostroma platystoma.

Species Fungorum added genus Theissenia (with its 2 species) to the family.

In 2018, multi-gene phylogenetic analyses revealed that Graphostromataceae was close to the families of Barrmaeliaceae and Xylariaceae (Daranagama et al. 2018, Voglmayr et al. 2018, Wendt et al. 2018). Then based on phylogeny and morphology, Theissenia was excluded from the family and accepted in Hypoxylaceae (Wendt et al. 2018). Five accepted genera maybe contained in the Graphostromataceae family: Biscogniauxia (formerly of family Xylariaceae), Camillea (formerly of family Xylariaceae), Graphostroma, Obolarina (formerly of family Xylariaceae), and Vivantia (formerly of family Xylariaceae). Species Fungorum agrees on the above.
