= Aureille =

Commune in Provence-Alpes-Côte d'Azur, France

- Commune
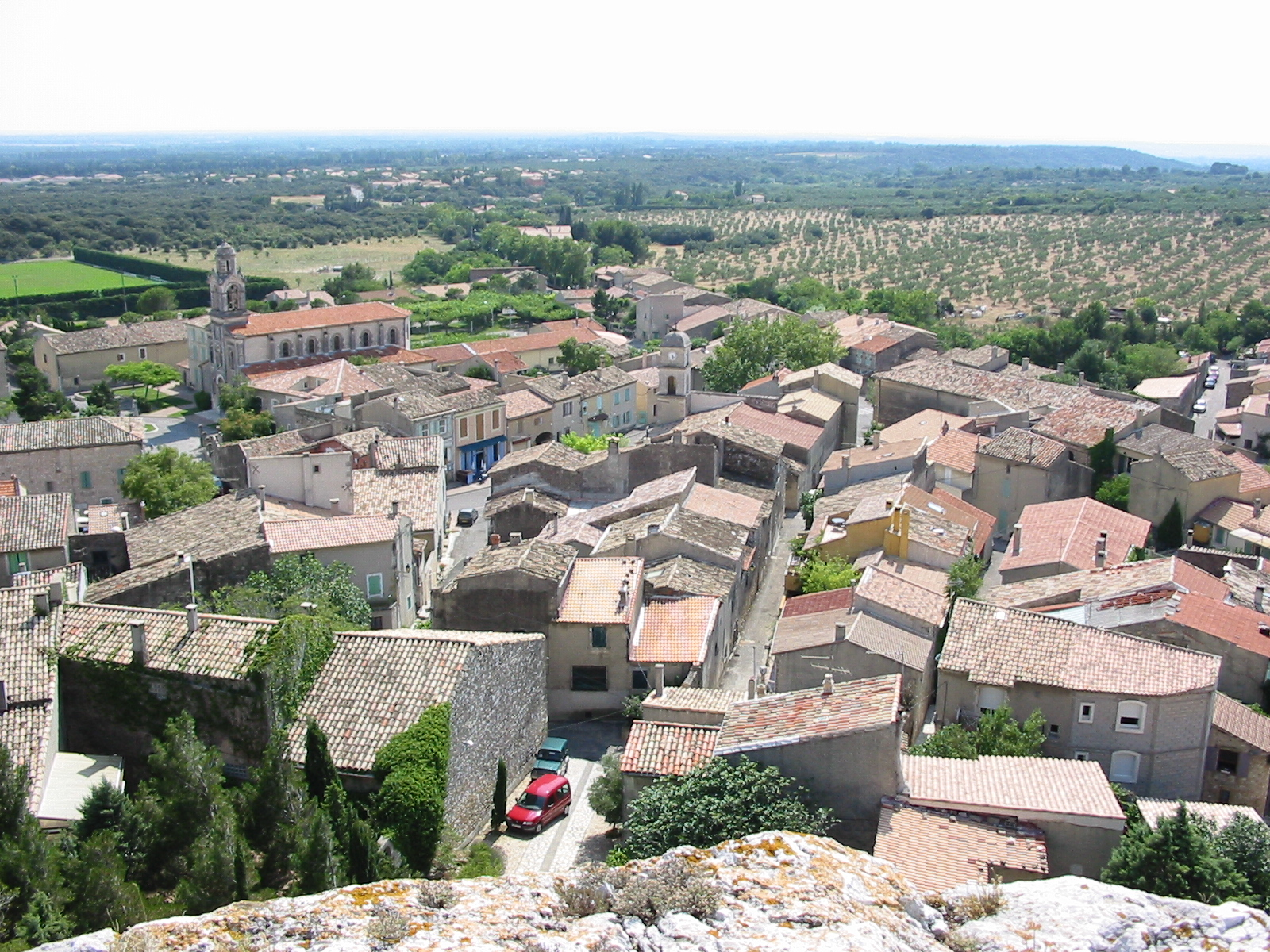
- Viewed from the castle

- Coat of arms
- Location of Aureille
- Location within France Location within Provence-Alpes-Côte d'Azur
- Coordinates: 43°42′29″N 4°56′46″E
- Country: France
- Region: Provence-Alpes-Côte d'Azur
- Department: Bouches-du-Rhône
- Arrondissement: Arles
- Canton: Salon-de-Provence-1
- Intercommunality: Vallée des Baux-Alpilles

Government
  - Mayor (2026–32): Lionel Escoffier
- Area^{1}: 21.74 km^{2} (8.39 sq mi)
- Highest elevation: 410 m (1,350 ft)
- Lowest elevation: 55 m (180 ft)
- Population (2023): 1,533
  - Density: 70.52/km^{2} (182.6/sq mi)
- Time zone: UTC+01:00 (CET)
  - Summer (DST): UTC+02:00 (CEST)
- INSEE/Postal code: 13006 /13930
- ^{1} French Land Register data, which excludes lakes, ponds, glaciers > 1 km^{2} (0.386 sq mi or 247 acres) and river estuaries.

Aureille (French pronunciation: [oʁɛj]; Occitan: Aurelha) is a commune in the Bouches-du-Rhône department in the Provence-Alpes-Côte d'Azur region of southern France.

The commune has been awarded one flower by the National Council of Towns and Villages in Bloom in the Competition of cities and villages in Bloom.

== Geography ==
=== Location ===
Aureille is located between the Alpilles mountain chain and the Crau plain some 8 km from Eyguières in the east and 8 km from Mouriès in the west. It is dominated by the Signal of Opiès, the highest point in the commune, in the north-east. It is a member of the communes of the Baux Valley but traditionally it is closer to the city of Arles.

=== Access ===
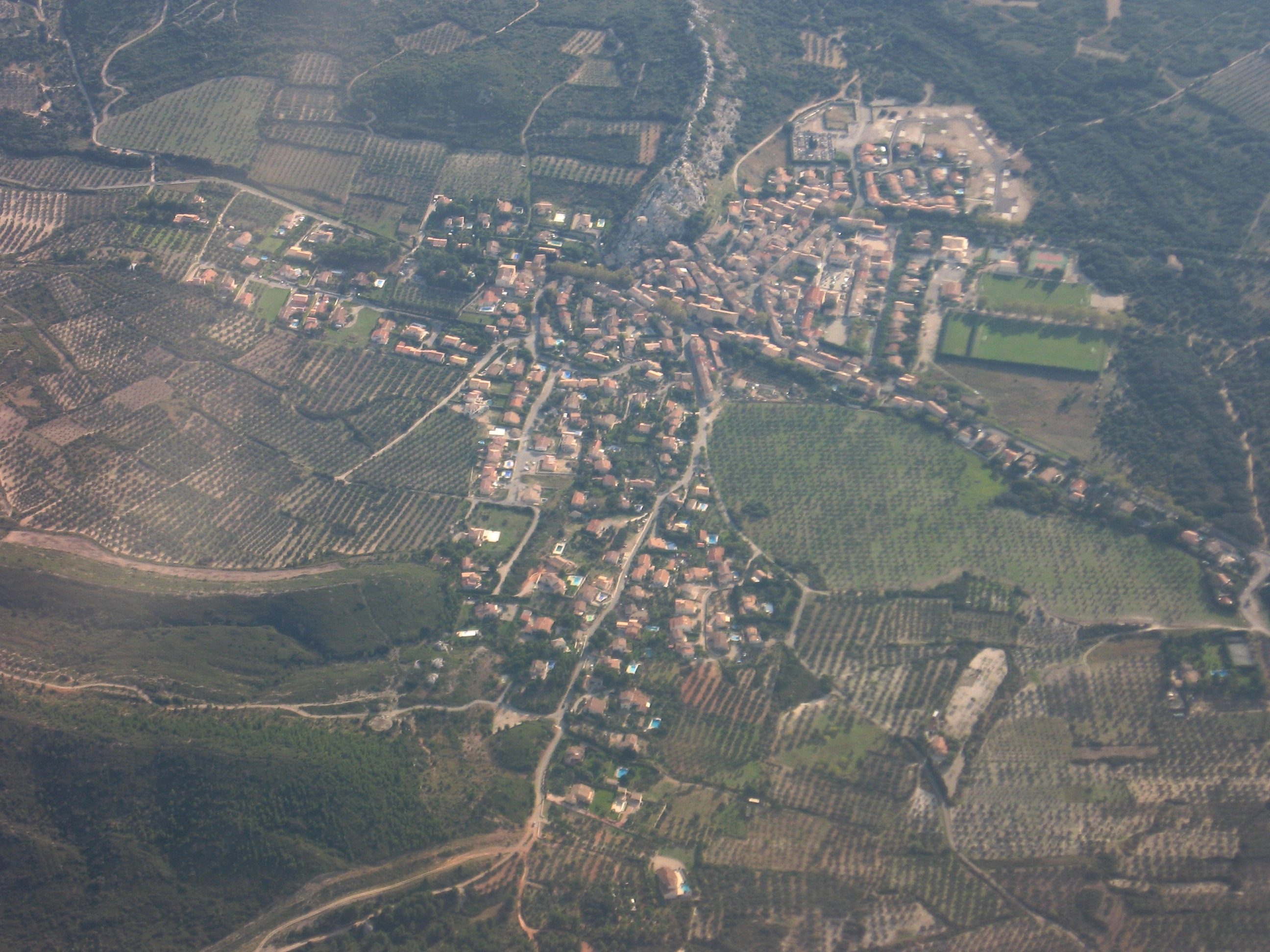
Aerial view of Aureille.

Road D17 passes through the commune south of the town from Eyguières in the east to Mouries in the west. Road D25A branches off this road in the commune and goes to the village then continues north to join the D25 just north of the commune.

The nearest motorway is the A54 autoroute (Nîmes - Salon-de-Provence) (E80) to the south with Exit 12 near Saint-Martin-de-Crau in the south-west or Exit 13 west of Salon-de-Provence in the south-east. There is also the A7 autoroute to the east which passes down the Rhone valley and connects Lyon to Marseille via Orange.

Marseille Provence Airport is the nearest international airport. There is also the Salon-de-Provence airbase just south of Salon-de-Provence town.

=== Geology ===
Geologically Aureille belongs to the Crau plain: its soil consists of Alluvium and pebbles. This type of soil is found throughout the Aureille plateau, to the point where it descends sharply at Mouriès. The soil composition is then modified, consisting of sloping deposits. The peaks north of Aureille, including the Tour des Opies, are very different from what is usually found in the Alpilles mountains. Although the soil at Opies is the same as the rest of the Alpilles, with a base of limestone Molasse, that of Opies dates to the Jurassic period while the Alpilles are more recent and date back to the Cretaceous (mainly Early Cretaceous).

=== Hydrography ===
Aureille is traversed by the Gaudre d'Aureille, a 12 km long stream, and also by the Gaudre de la Vallongue, which is 4.2 kilometres long. They both flow into the Étang de Berre.

The Gaudre de Romanin, a 9.4 km long sub-tributary of the Durance, also flows through the commune.

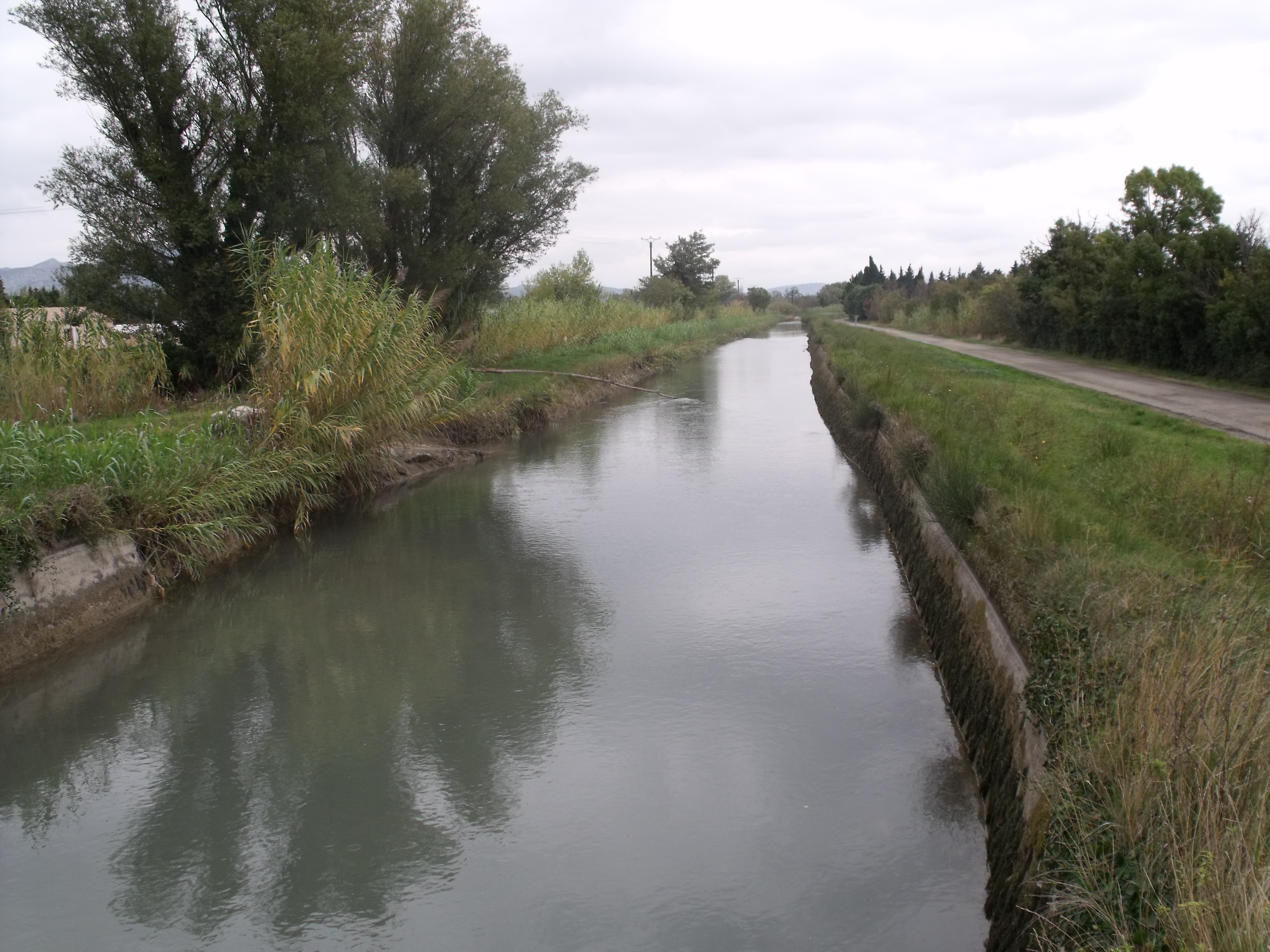
The Craponne Canal

The Arles branch of the Craponne Canal has irrigated the south of the commune since June 1582 which has allowed the commune to be a major producer of Crau hay.

The Baux Valley Canal crosses the commune to the north of the plain. This canal was built in 1914 following an intervention led by Paul Révoil, the Ambassador of France - who was from Mouriès, to cope with periods of drought which compelled more and more people from the Alpilles to move to Crau which was better irrigated.

=== Climate ===
The climate in Aureille, as in the Alpilles, is considered Mediterranean. The winters are mild and relatively wet while summers are hot and dry. The highest average temperatures occur in July and August (29 °C) while the lowest average temperatures occur in December and January (+3 °C). The month with the most rain is January with 7 days of rain on average against 2 days in July. The Alpilles region receives more rainfall than the coast of the Mediterranean: 500 mm/year in Camargue against 600 to 700 mm/year at Aureille.

Major frosts are rare although they were more frequent in the 19th century as evidenced by the many freezes of the Rhône which have been virtually unknown in the last century.

Comparison of local Meteorological data with other cities in France
Town	Sunshine (hours/yr)	Rain (mm/yr)	Snow (days/yr)	Storm (days/yr)	Fog (days/yr)
National average	1,973	770	14	22	40
Aureille	-	580	2	20	8
Paris	1,661	637	12	18	10
Nice	2,724	767	1	29	1
Strasbourg	1,693	665	29	29	56
Brest	1,605	1,211	7	12	75

=== The mistral ===
The mistral blows violently from the north or north-west especially in winter and spring. The Alpilles deflect the wind, but Aureille does not benefit from its position to the south of the foothills of the massif and the wind blows almost as strong as in the north of the mountains. The mistral blows strongly on average 100 days a year and less strongly on 83 days which leaves only 182 days per year without wind.

There are two types of mistral: the "white mistral" which clears the entire sky and accentuates the brightness; and the "black mistral", which is rarer, that is accompanied by rain.

=== Flora and fauna ===
==== Fauna ====
Many animal species nest in the Alpilles and may be observed in Aureille. The most famous is the Bonelli's eagle, a protected species, as well as the Egyptian vulture, the lesser kestrel, and the Eurasian eagle-owl.

Arid rocks are home to a species of lizard emblematic of the Alpilles: the ocellated lizard, which is also considered threatened and is protected.

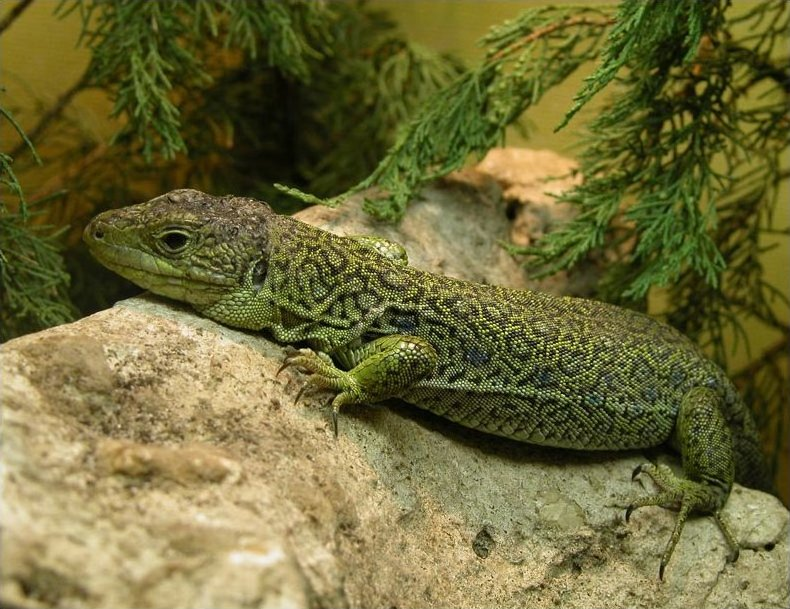
Ocellated lizard

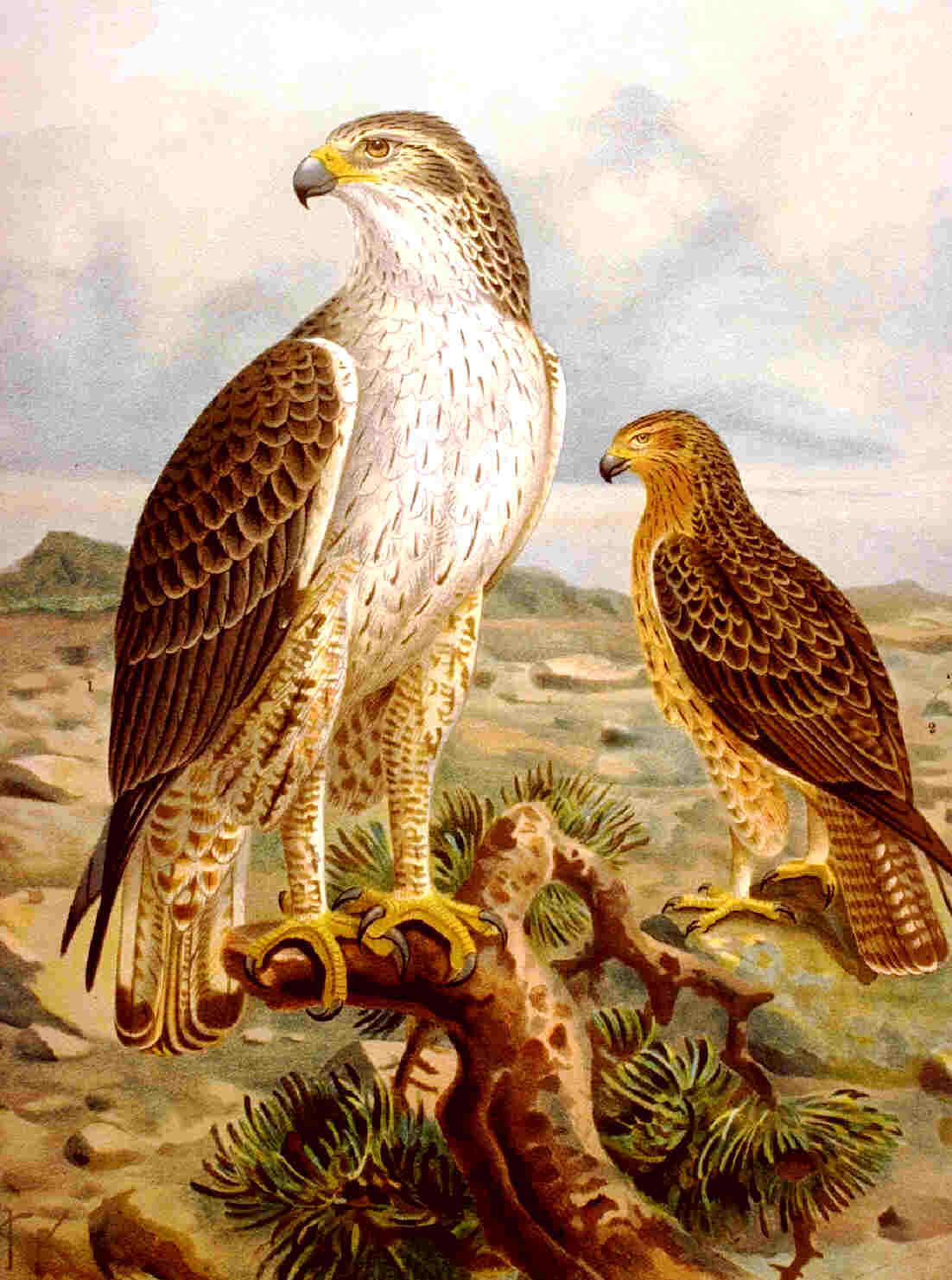
Bonelli's eagle

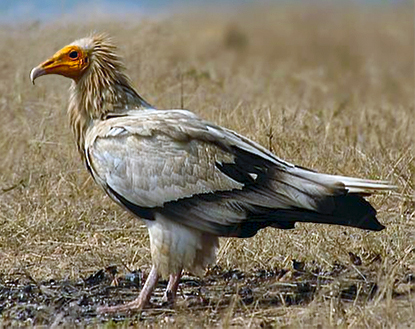
Egyptian vulture

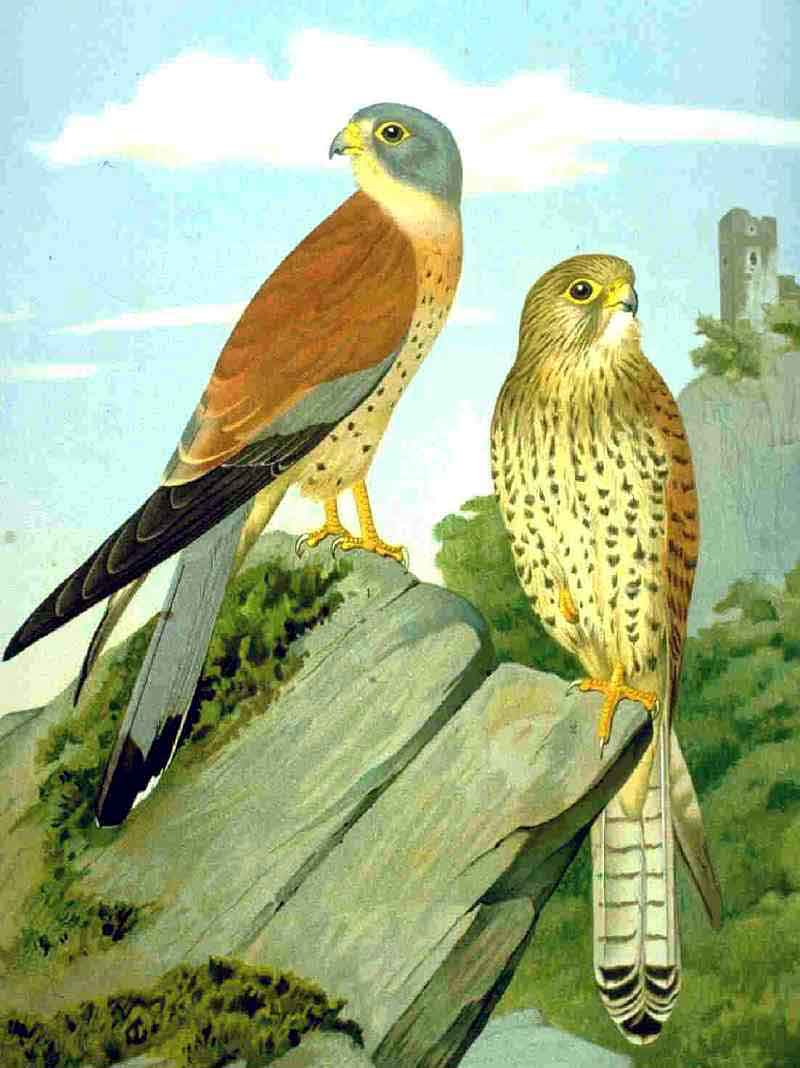
Lesser kestrel

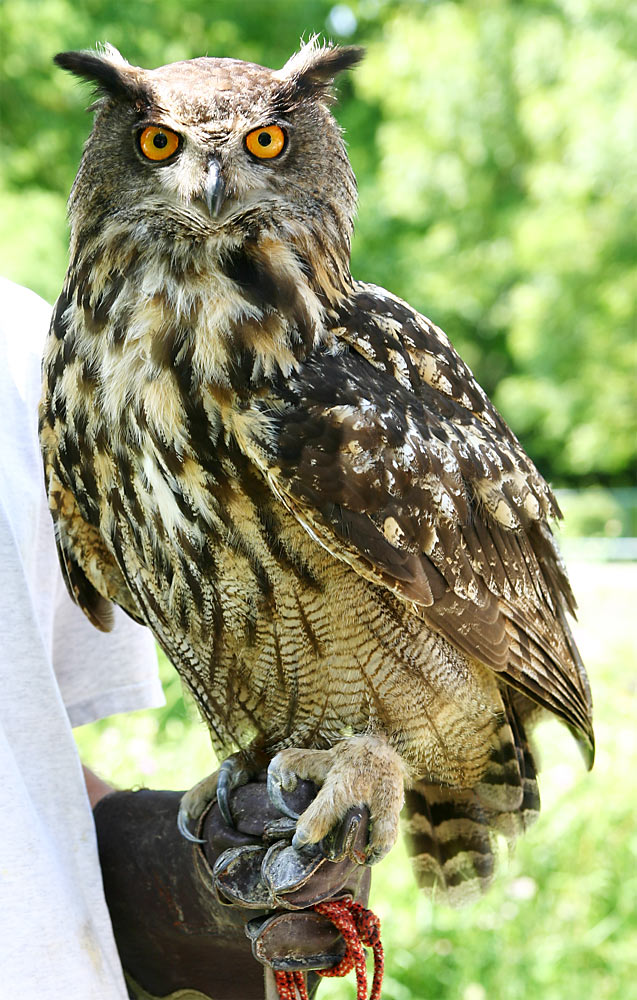
Eurasian eagle-owl

==== Hunted species ====
There are many mammals in Aureille, especially in the valleys. The wild boar is abundant and its population is growing. Conversely, the number of hares and rabbits has tended to decrease. The reason seems to be the epidemic of myxomatosis in 1953 which caused havoc in the population and, since the end of the 20th century, the VHD virus that caused the decrease in the species. The scarcity of rodents could be problematic in the long term for the survival of birds of prey that feed on them.

==== Other animal species ====
Other species that can be seen in Aureille include the fox, the badger, the weasel, and the vole. There are also bats.

=== Flora ===
The flora in Aureille is essentially Xerophytic and Mediterranean. The botanist Bernard Girerd counted 800 plant species in 1992. Apart from the olive, which is characteristic of Aureille, there are the Celtis, the kermes oak (Quercus coccifera), and the Amelanchier.

Protected plant species such as the summer snowflake (Leucojum aestivum) and rock rose (Helianthemum lavandulaefolium) can be found at the bottom of the valleys.

== Toponymy ==
The oldest forms of the name Aureille are found in the name of a priory in the 11th century: Sancta Maria Auricula and again in 1189 in the name Ugo de Aurella.

Etymologists are not all of one mind as to the meaning of the name Aureille. There are three theories:

- the name is linked to the Via Aurelian. This path, however, does not pass through the village but is much further south;
- the name is from a Provencal root auro meaning "wind" in Provençal;
- Charles Rostaing in his dictionary of toponymy saw Aureille as the name of a Roman landowner Aurelius. There is an old family from Arles with that name which would tend to confirm this hypothesis.

The Provencal spelling is Aurelha according to the classical norm and Aureio according to the Mistralian norm.

== History ==
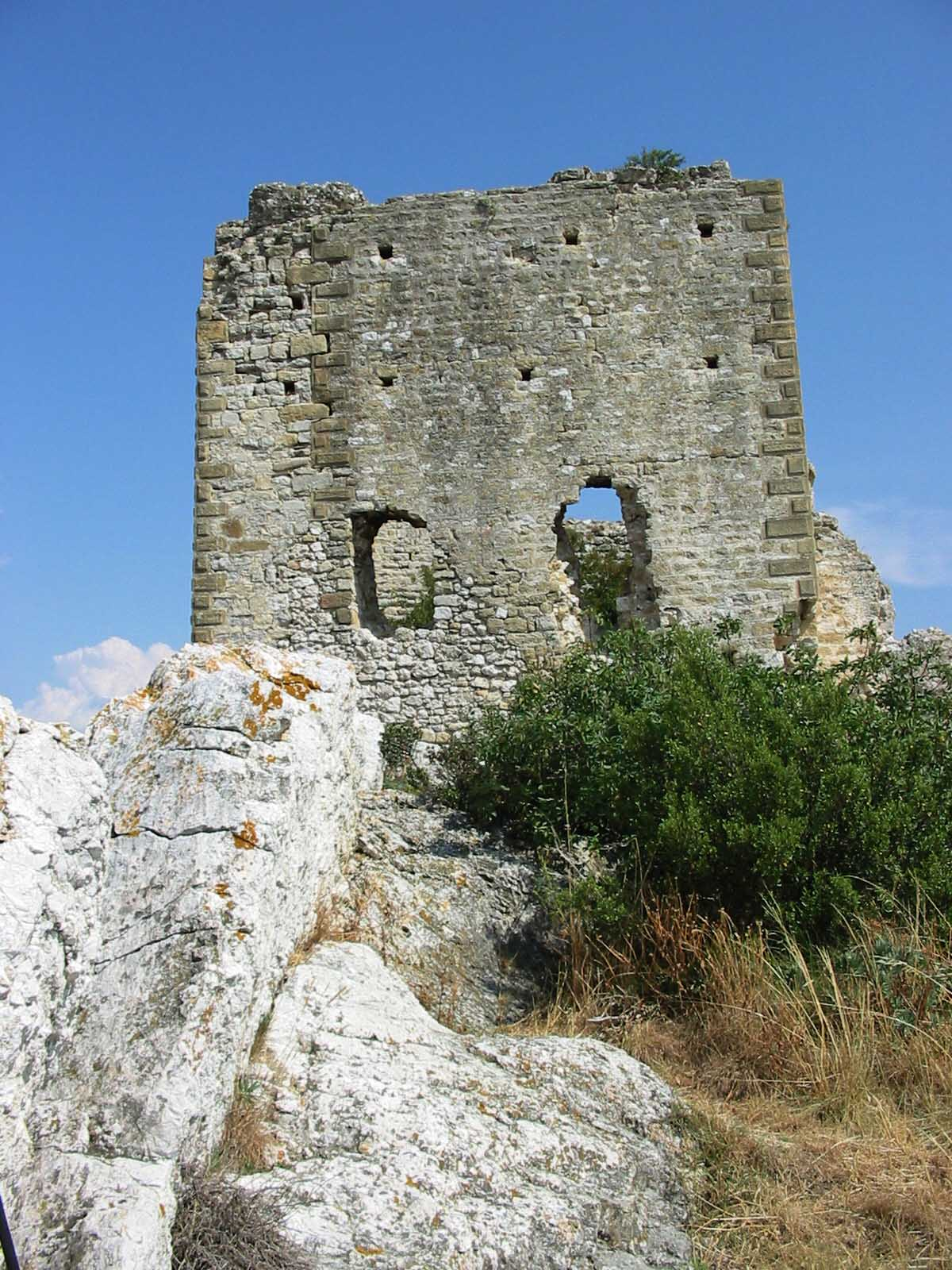
Part of the ruined wall of the Château d'Aureille.

=== Prehistory and antiquity ===
In the period of the Hallstatt culture (from the 8th to the 6th centuries BC) prehistoric habitats continued to be inhabited, particularly in the Tardières valley although they had a stone rampart.

In the centuries before the Romans arrived, the territory of Aureille as with all of the Alpilles, was populated by Ligures, Celts, and Celto-Ligurians. Aureille was then probably part of the territory of the Nearchi, for whom Ernaginum formed the northern border, but also perhaps populated by Anatilii who lived to the north of Crau and for whom the Alpilles was the natural border. Proto-historic paths then connected the many oppida in the Alpilles and allowed the crossing of the mountains in a transverse direction. In the second part of the Hallstatt culture (7th to 6th centuries BC) the population became sedentary and began to build durable buildings. The castrum was structured in the manner of a village with its streets and terraced houses. This permanent settlement process happened in parallel with the intensification of trade with Mediterranean merchants. In exchange for luxury goods, Alpilles people produced grain and passed to a state of Autarky with a real trade economy. Over the following centuries, the population of Alpilles decreased consistently: the Greek trading post at Arles attracted many people from all over the region.

Although the Aureille area was inhabited since antiquity, it is conceivable that one of the Aurelius people had a villa. Germanic invasions desertified the area from the 5th century.

=== Middle Ages ===
From the 12th century the population returned. The village church of Sancta Maria de Auricula belonged to the Diocese of Arles. In 1224 a citizen of Arles, Bertrand Ybilion - the owner of the castrum, ceded it to the Arles community. Arles however could not occupy a territory so far away. Aureille became deserted, especially since the village regularly underwent the passage of free companies in the 14th century.

=== Renaissance ===
It was not until 31 May 1604 that the village became populated again. Louise d'Ancézune, Lady of Saint-Chaumont, bought three quarters of the land of Aureille from the Consulate of Arles for the sum of 23,820 Écus. As the widow of Saint-Christophe de Chaumont, first Baron of Lyonnais, she possessed a considerable fortune. "Because the land had been left for over two hundred years and was uncultivated desert, the said Madame de Saint-Chaumont desires to build some houses there and make it fertile and well cultivated".

That is how the village came to be repopulated. Settlers came to live there encouraged by tax incentives that were offered. Between 1608 and 1620 twenty families became established in Aureille at whose head were Antoine Payan and Antoine Escarioly, inhabitants of Eyguières. These families lived at Eyguières but were from the Alps (Gap, Sisteron, Barcelonnette, the Dauphiné, or, closer, the region of Apt). Uncultivated land was cleared and the breeding of goats and sheep was practiced. The Lord maintained herds of horses and cattle.

=== Modern period ===
In 1792 when the Committee of Public Safety reproved the Aureille community for not having reported suspects to them and called into doubt the civic-mindedness of the inhabitants. The response from Aureille was: "Our community is a small population composed of people employed solely in working on the land. Always firm in republican principles we are ready to support you until the last breath. There has never been any suspect among us, so we do not therefore intend to send any tabulation on this subject".

The Aureille community endured several episodes of plague and cholera, especially during the 19th century.

=== Contemporary period ===
From 1970 the village has provided utilities which gave Aureille new impetus and a significant increase in the population. In October 1989 a major fire ravaged 1,500 hectares of the Alpilles most of which was in the commune.

=== Heraldry ===
Arms of Aureille	Blazon: Party per pale, first of Gules with a tower ported of Or embattled of 3 pieces and masonned of Sable, second of Or a lion sejant erect of Gules.

== Administration ==
List of Successive Mayors

Mayors from the French Revolution to 1942

From	To	Name	Party	Position
1790	1791	André Blanc		
1791	1792	Jean-Joseph Andre		
1792	1792	André Blanc		
1792	1796	Jean-Baptiste Gerard		
1796	1803	André Blanc		
1803	1806	Antoine Blache		
1806	1819	Jean-François Demonteau		
1820	1823	Louis Bonnet		
1823	1831	Jean-Pierre Second		
1831	1832	Joseph Viaud		
1832	1837	Joseph Franc		
1837	1840	André Garcin		
1840	1843	Claude Jean		
1843	1848	Joseph Trousset de Jacques		
1848	1852	Pierre Barbier		
1852	1852	Joseph Payan		
1852	1854	Etienne Imbert		
1854	1870	Théogène d'Assailly		
1870	1871	Pierre Barbier		
1871	1880	Théogène d'Assailly		
1880	1888	Joseph Terris		
1888	1892	Jean-Baptiste Codur		
1892	1897	Gustave Bertrand		
1897	1904	Louis Joubert		
1904	1913	Eugène Esperandieu		
1913	1920	Evariste Bertrand		
1920	1929	Marius Coulon		
1929	1931	Paulin Courlet		
1931	1942	Louis Perrot		

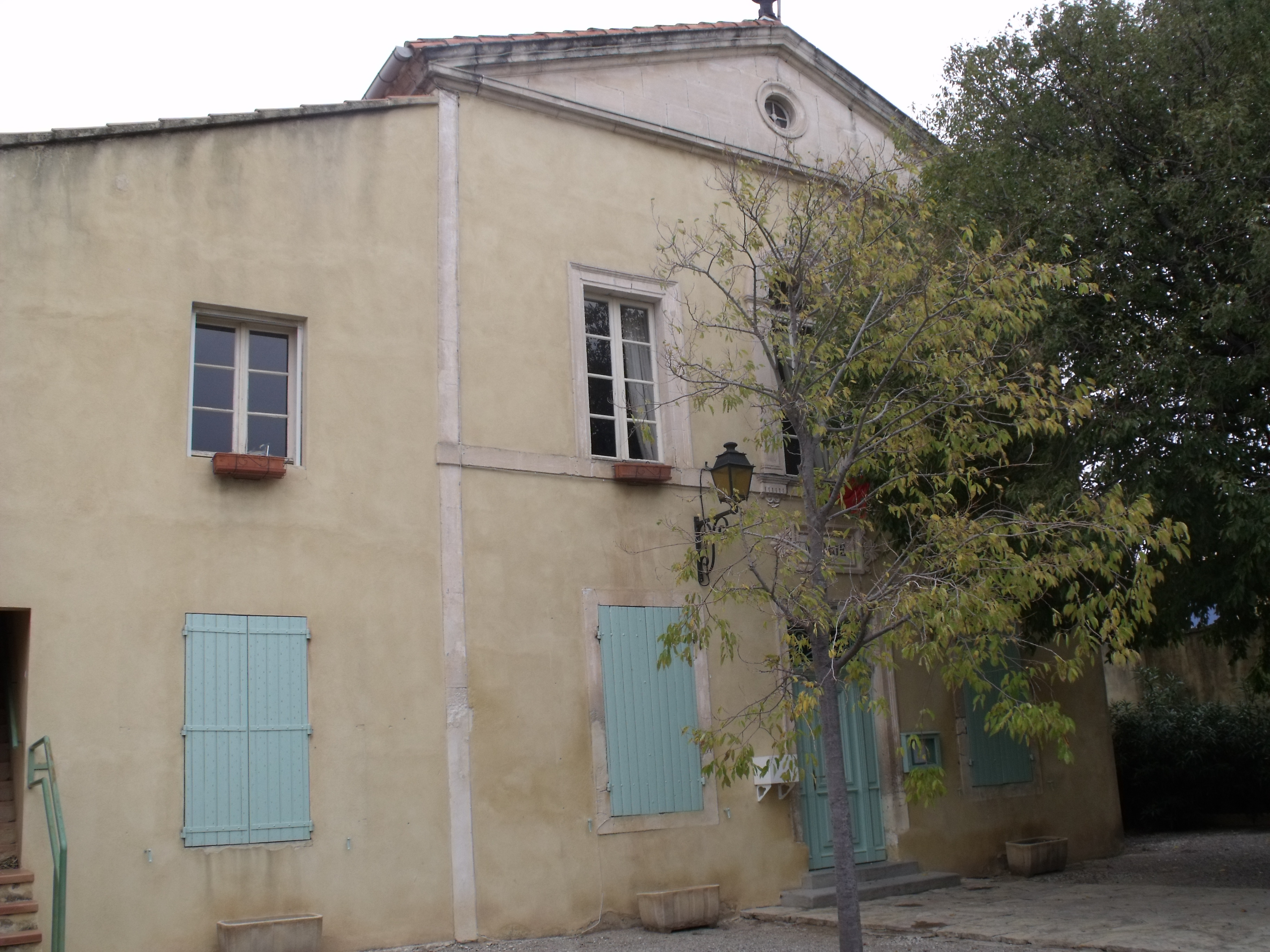
The Town Hall

Mayors from 1942

From	To	Name	Party
1942	1944	Eugène Aurran	
1944	1945	Louis Perrot	
1945	1947	Achille Guillaumier	
1977	1991	Aimé Guillaumier	
1991	2001	Marcel Guillaumier	
2001	2020	Régis Gatti	DVG
2020	2026	Lionel Escoffier	

=== Twinning ===
Aureille has twinning associations with:

- Carisio (Italy) since 1987.

== Population ==
The inhabitants of the commune are known as Aureillois or Aureilloises in French.

Historical population
Year	Pop.	±% p.a.
1968	518	—
1975	573	+1.45%
1982	835	+5.53%
1990	1,220	+4.85%
1999	1,357	+1.19%
2007	1,463	+0.94%
2012	1,544	+1.08%
2017	1,522	−0.29%
2023	1,533	+0.12%
Source: INSEE

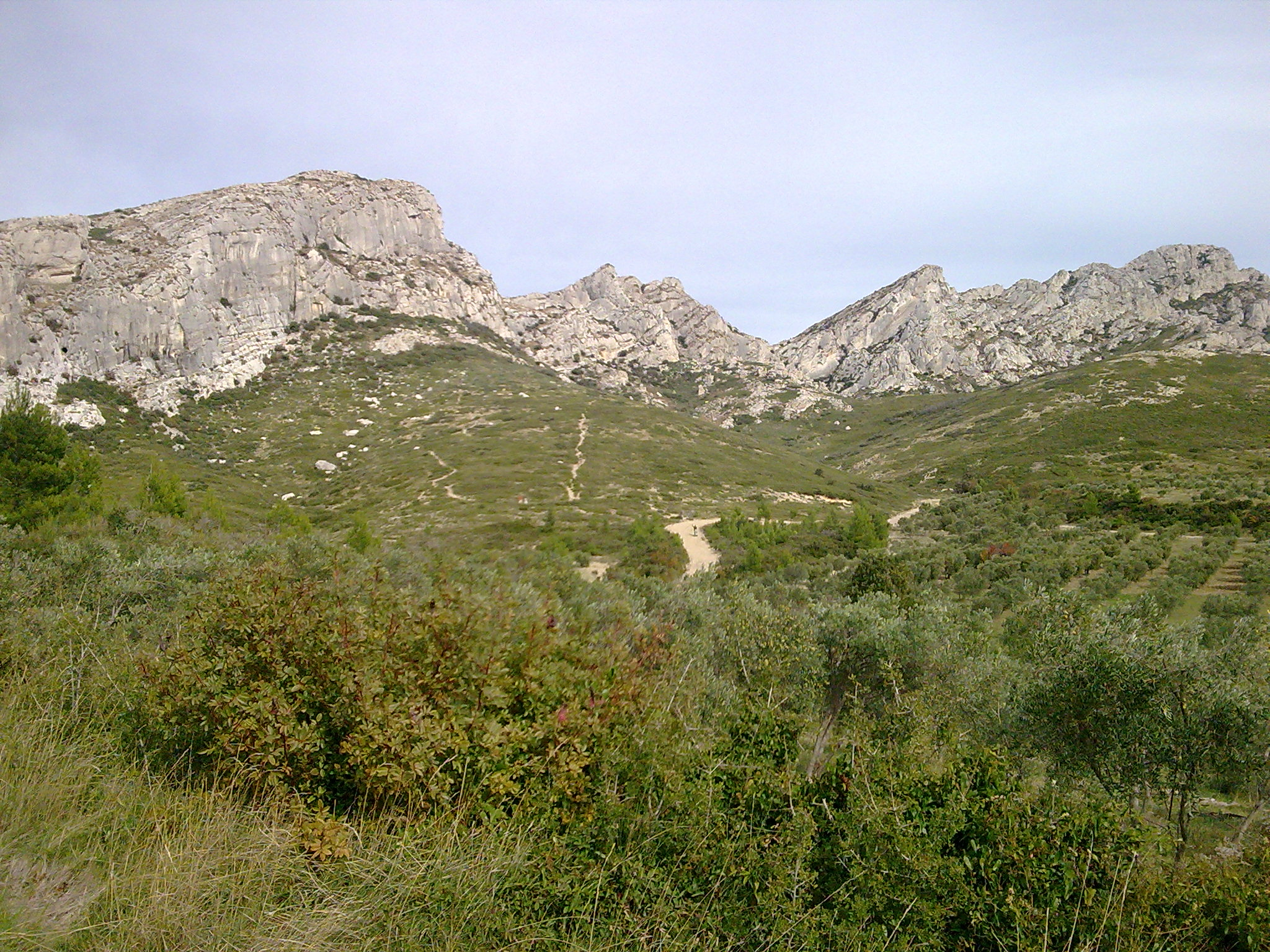
The Alpilles at Aureille

== Economy ==
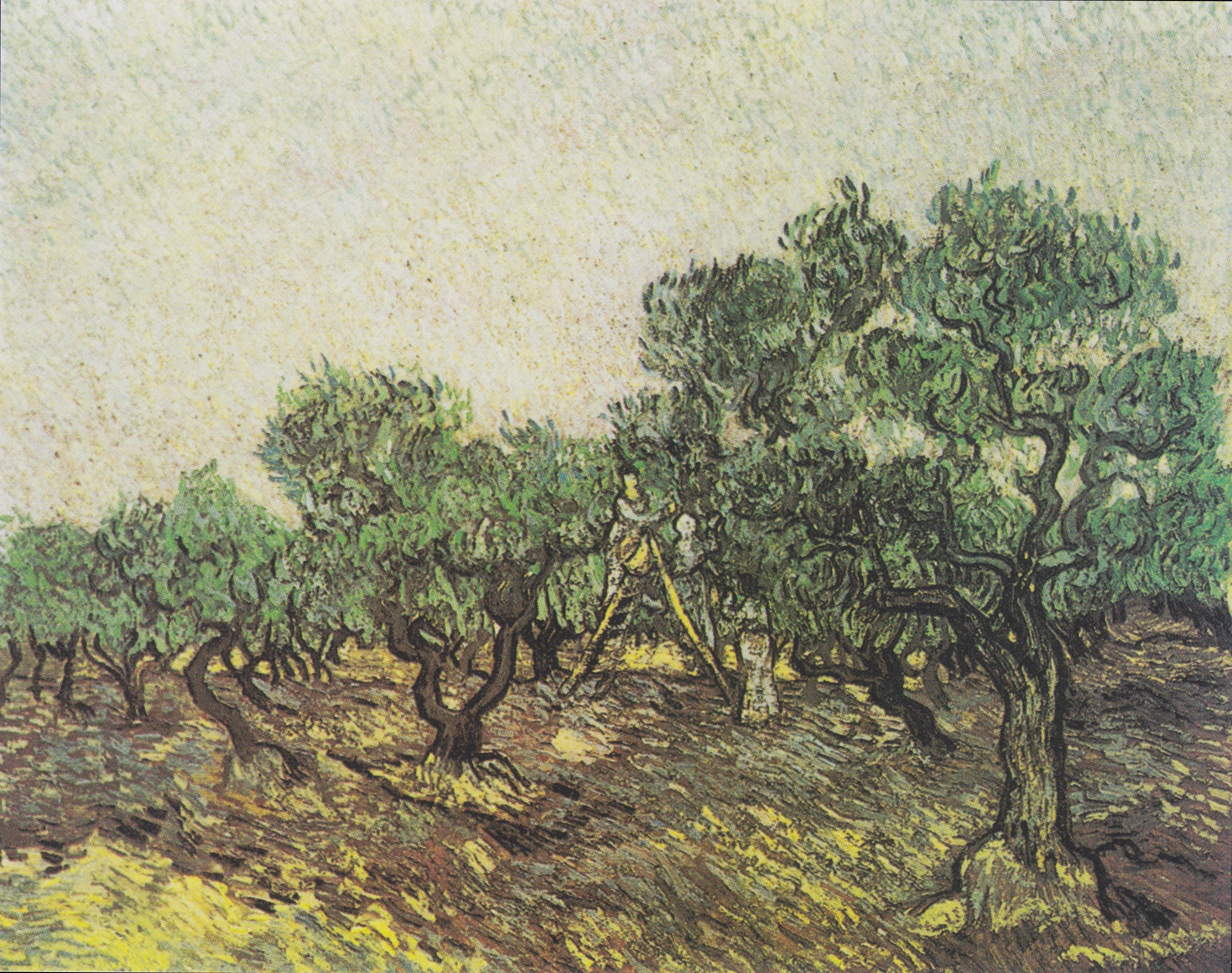
Picking olives Vincent van Gogh, December 1889

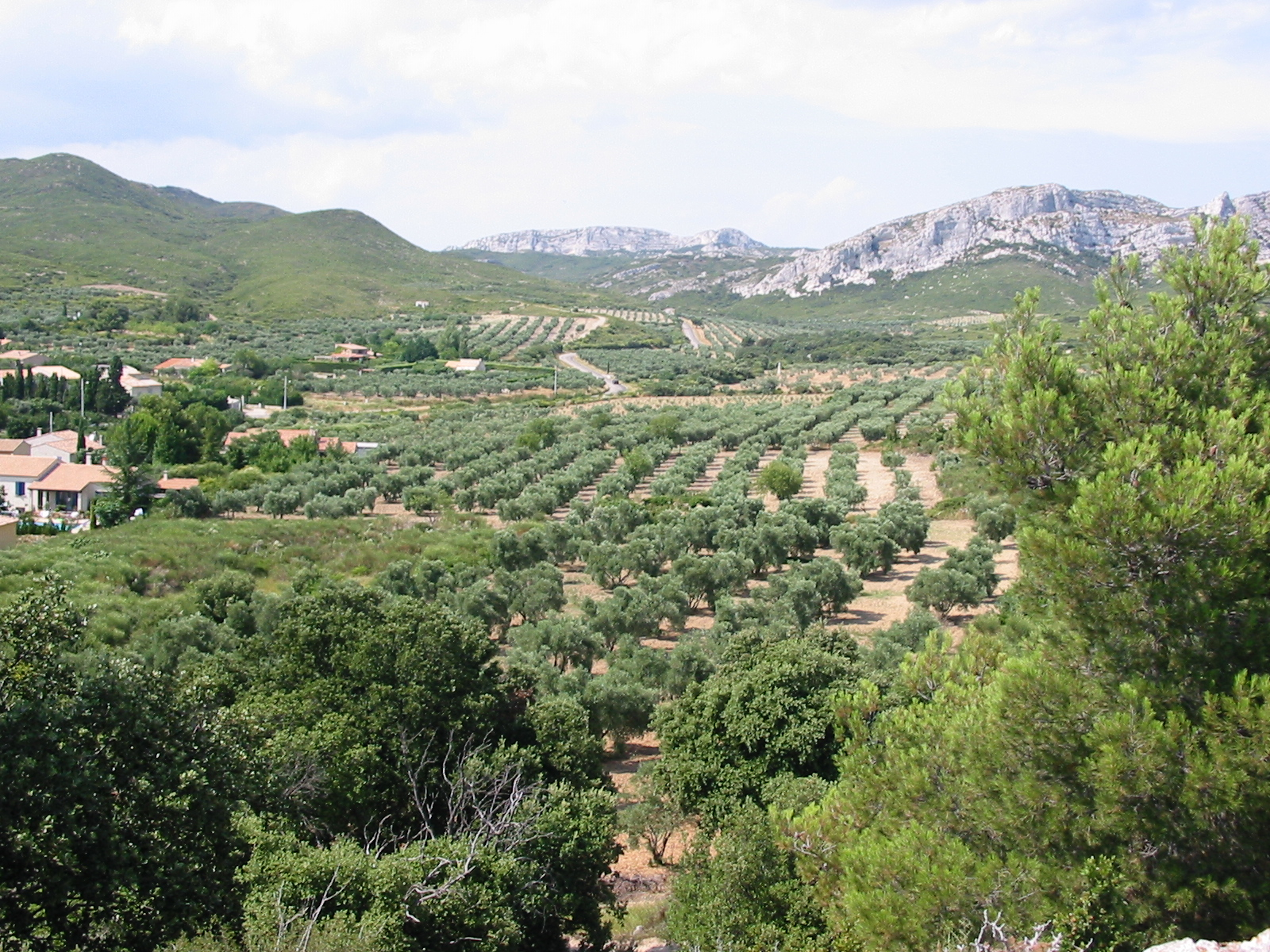
Olive fields in Aureille

=== Agriculture ===
Agriculture is very active in Aureille with the growing of fruit and vegetables and Crau hay which is animal feed protected by an AOC (31 May 1997).

Sheep farming is common in the commune as with many other communes in the Alpilles.

The commune produces Olive oil from the Valley of Baux-de-Provence which has been protected by an Appellation d'origine contrôlée (AOC) since 27 August 1997. The varieties of olives that fall within the AOC are Salonenque, beruguette, Grossane, and verdale des Bouches-du-Rhône. Crushed olives and black olives are also produced under the INAO order. The varieties of broken olives proposed for marketing are salonenque and Béruguette. For black olives the only variety that is accepted is Grossane.

=== Tourism ===
Apart from agriculture the main economic activity around the Alpilles is tourism. Even the wine and olive oil producers take into account the development of tourism and increasingly the farms offer tasting and in some cases courses in Oenology.

There are three main types of tourism in the Alpilles:

- historical and cultural tourism that relies on the rich heritage (Baux-de-Provence, Glanum, etc..) and festivals.
- relaxation tourism which has resulted in a significant expansion of B&Bs, hotels and seasonal rental accommodation through a high concentration of swimming pools and entertainment such as the Provencal markets.
- green tourism that has many hiking trails and protected areas in the mountains and their surroundings.

There are many tourist apartments and hotels in the commune.

== Main sights ==
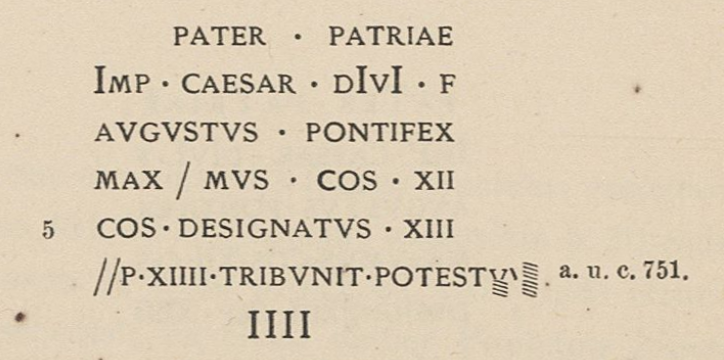
The Calanque milestone.

- The southern border of the commune with Saint-Martin-de-Crau probably corresponds to a section of the Via Aurelia in the ancient territory of Salon. TheCalanque milestone was found in several fragments a few hundred metres north-west of Archimbaud-en-Crau farmhouse and is still on the Roman road almost in situ. Its Latin inscription shows that it was dedicated to the Emperor Augustus in the year 3 BC and indicates the fourth (IIII) Roman mile from southern Mouriès which was the beginning of the ancient territory of Crau d'Arles.
- The Chateau of Aureille has architecture from the late 12th century to the beginning of the 13th century and overlooks the village offering a great view over the plain of La Crau. It is mentioned in the will of Pons de Lamanon (10 September 1359) and has been the possession of the Lamanon family since at least 1289. The chateau was besieged in 1592 to dislodge the troops of Captain Rondellet. Dismantling of the chateau began the following year resulting in much the form it has today. The building has two levels: a ground floor accessible from the southeast and a floor lit by an impressive bay. The front door has been restored.

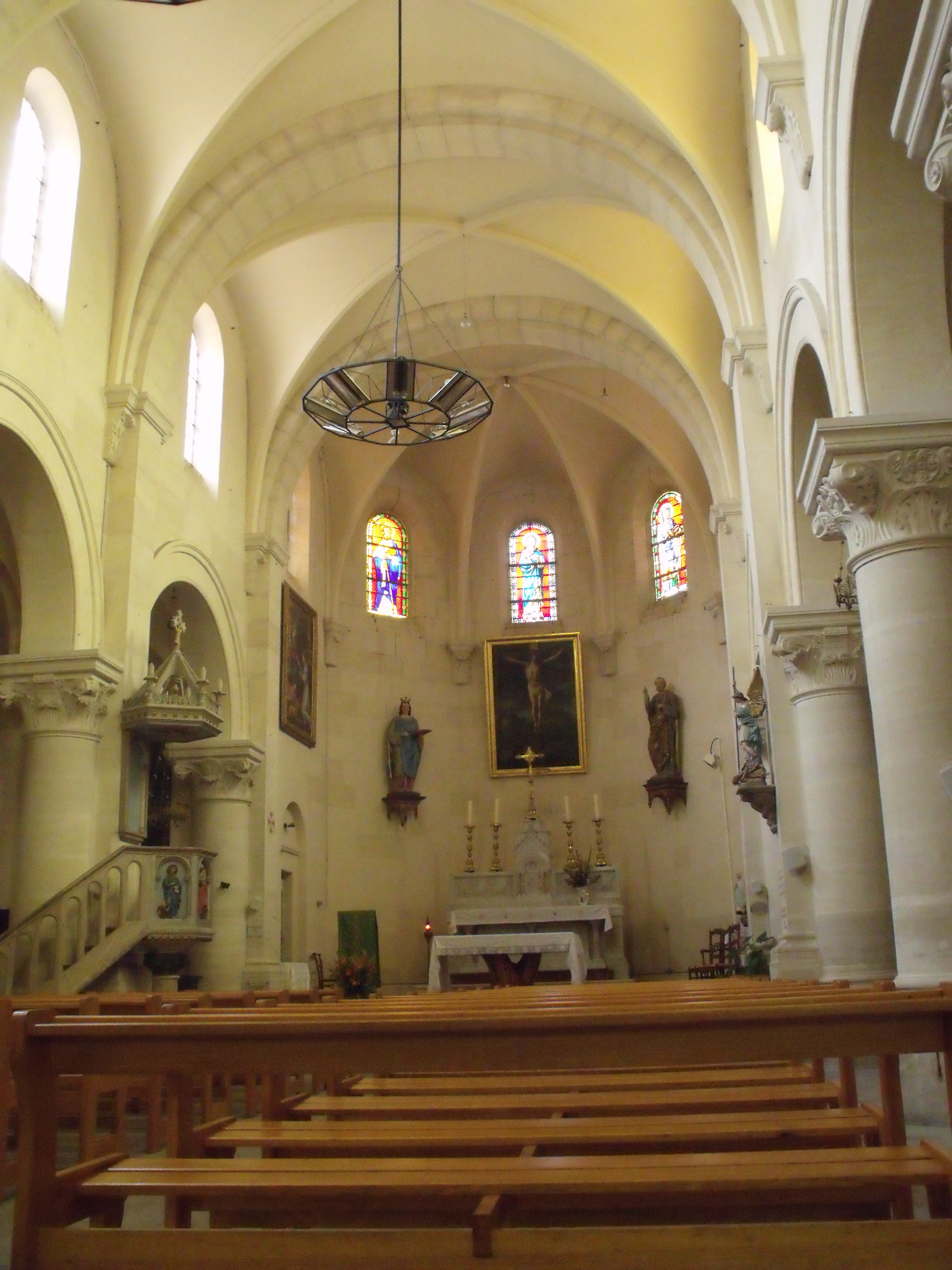
Aureille Church

The old Aureille Church was called Sancta Maria de Auricula ("St. Mary of Aureille") in the Middle Ages but it has disappeared and the exact location has not been found. In the 17th century a new church was built at the expense of the inhabitants. It was so small that the Archbishop of Arles reported in 1619 that it was characterized by its poverty and discomfort. The building was extended after the plague of 1720 and a chapel dedicated to St. Veran came to append it. Throughout the 18th century and the early 19th century it was constantly in poor condition (it was even closed several years during the Revolution). In the second part of the 19th century it was replaced by a new church located in the Church Square. Today the old church, known as the clock tower, is a municipal property.

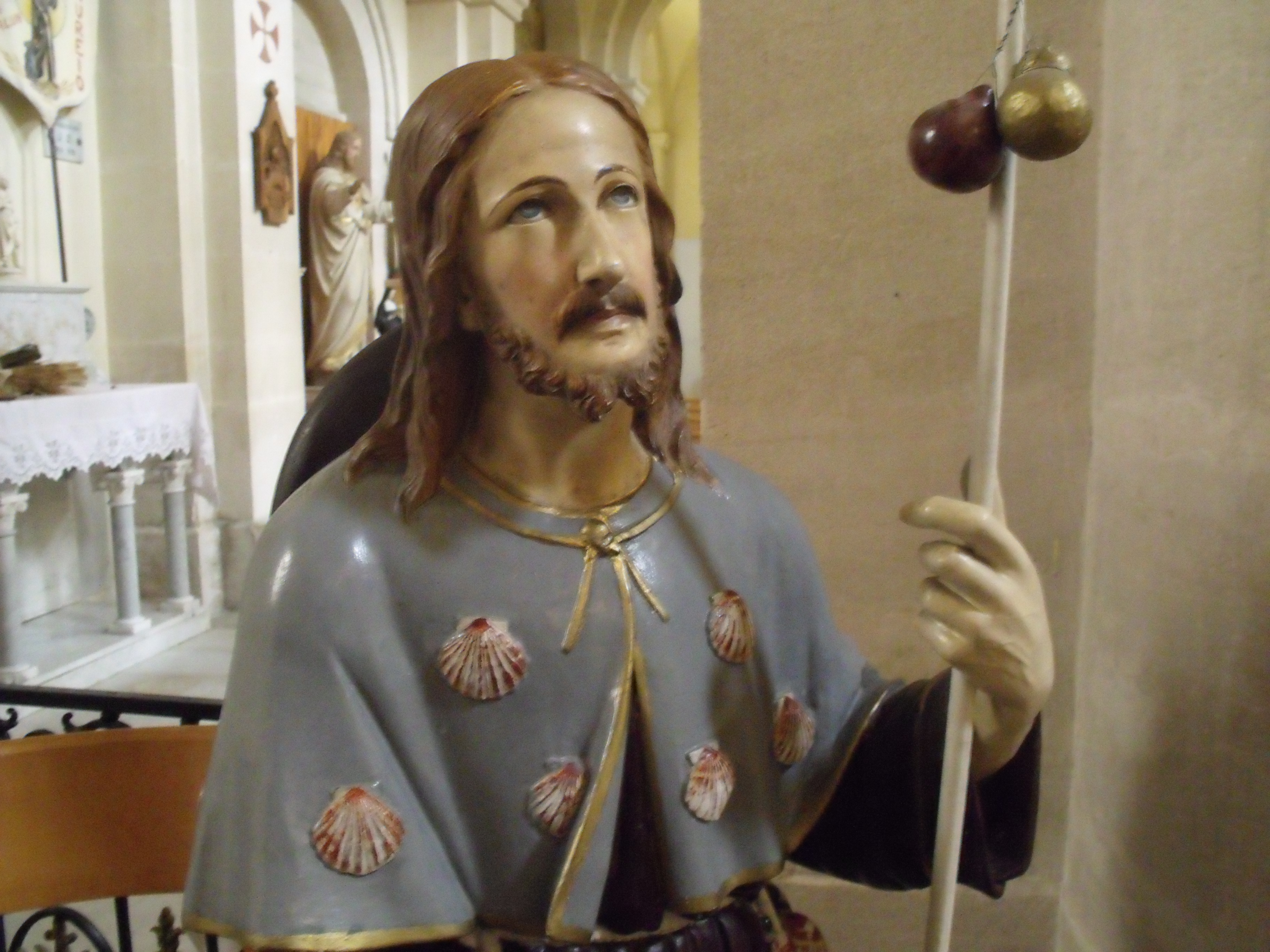
Statue of Saint Roch (Aureille Church).

- The construction of the New Church was initiated by a new priest, Father Pauleau, who arrived in Aureille in 1867. The first stone was laid by Georges Chalandon, the Archbishop of Aix, on 31 March 1867. His plans were the work of the Arles architect Auguste Veran.
- Aureille has several oratories including the Saint-Veran Oratory Saint Veran is venerated by shepherds, of which there are many in Aureille, due to the intense pastoral activity that has developed over the centuries. Other oratories are dedicated to saints venerated in Provence: Saint Joseph (ca. 1840), Saint Peter, Saint Anne, Saint Eloi, and Saint Roch.
- Because of the many droughts experienced in Aureille over the centuries, the village has many fountains and a Lavoir (Public laundry) which includes two outdoor fountains. On the Church Square stands a mossy fountain topped with a fig tree
- The Old Olive oil mill from the 17th century.
- The Arena (1963) is registered as a historical monument.

== Facilities ==
=== Education ===
The town has a public nursery school and a public elementary school.

=== Health ===
The town has a doctor, but no pharmacy. The nearest ones are about 6 kilometres away at Eygalières or Mouriès.

The nearest hospital is about 11 km away in Sénas commune.

=== Sports ===
There are two playing fields south of the town.

The GR 6 footpath passes through the commune and the village from east to west and several other paths are available for hiking.

=== Worship ===
There is Catholic worship in the parish church.

=== Environment ===
Treatment of waste from households and similar waste is managed by the Community of communes of the Baux Valley.

== People ==
- Théogène d'Assailly (Marseille 1809 - Aureille 5 May 1880), Mayor of Aureille, member of the General Council of Bouches-du-Rhône, buried in the cemetery at Aureille.
- André Solerb(Salon-de-Provence 1937 - 1998), specialist in Bullfighting, gave his name to the Arena and is the subject of the André-Soler memorial at Aureille.
- César Bernaudon, first mayor of the commune of Saint-Martin-De-Crau from which he rose to the creation by distraction of the commune of Arles in 1925.

== See also ==
- Alpilles
- Communes of the Bouches-du-Rhône department
