= Baphala eremiella =

Scientific classification
- Kingdom: Animalia
- Phylum: Arthropoda
- Class: Insecta
- Order: Lepidoptera
- Family: Pyralidae
- Genus: Baphala
- Species: B. eremiella

Binomial name
- Baphala eremiella (Dyar, 1910)

Synonyms
- Laetilia eremiella Dyar, 1910

Species of moth

Baphala eremiella is a species of snout moth in the genus Baphala. It was described by Harrison Gray Dyar Jr. in 1910, and is found in the US state of California.

The larvae feed on scale insects.

== Taxonomy ==
The species was formerly listed as a synonym of Baphala pallida.
