= Baphala homoeosomella =

Scientific classification
- Kingdom: Animalia
- Phylum: Arthropoda
- Clade: Pancrustacea
- Class: Insecta
- Order: Lepidoptera
- Family: Pyralidae
- Genus: Baphala
- Species: B. homoeosomella

Binomial name
- Baphala homoeosomella (Zeller, 1881)

Synonyms
- Euzophera homoeosomella Zeller, 1881; Vitula bodkini Dyar, 1913; Vitula rusto Dyar, 1914; Vitula taboga Dyar, 1914; Vitula saisseliae Dyar, 1929

Species of moth

Baphala homoeosomella is a species of snout moth in the genus Baphala. It was described by Philipp Christoph Zeller in 1881, and is found in Cuba, the Virgin Islands, Panama, Guyana, Colombia and Brazil.

The wingspan is 11–16 mm.

The larvae feed on scale insects of the Saissetia, Ceroplastes and Toumayella genera.
