= Baphala goyensis =

Scientific classification
- Domain: Eukaryota
- Kingdom: Animalia
- Phylum: Arthropoda
- Class: Insecta
- Order: Lepidoptera
- Family: Pyralidae
- Genus: Baphala
- Species: B. goyensis

Binomial name
- Baphala goyensis (Ragonot, 1901)

Synonyms
- Zophodia goyensis Ragonot, 1901; Baphala goyensis olivacea Heinrich, 1956

Species of moth

Baphala goyensis is a species of snout moth in the genus Baphala. It was described by Émile Louis Ragonot in 1901, and is found in south-eastern Brazil, Uruguay and Argentina.

The wingspan is 18–20 mm. The extreme base of the forewings is blackish fuscous. It is whitish beyond to the broad blackish fuscous antemedial band. The ground color of the wing between the lower margin of the cell and the costa and between the antemedial and subterminal transverse markings is whitish. The remainder of the wing shades to smoky fuscous with only a faint dusting of white at the apex.

The larvae feed on scale insects of the Ceroplastes and Saissetia genera.
