= Salonenque =

Olive cultivar

Olive (Olea europaea)
- Color of the ripe fruit: Green
- Also called: Plant de salon, Courniand, Suren, Varagen
- Origin: France
- Notable regions: Provence
- Hazards: Verticillium dahliae, Sooty moulds, Saissetia oleae
- Use: Oil and table
- Oil content: High
- Fertility: Partially self-fertile
- Growth form: Erect
- Leaf: Elliptic-lanceolate
- Weight: Medium/high
- Shape: Ovoid
- Symmetry: Slightly asymmetrical

The Salonenque, carrying the name of Salon-de-Provence, is a cultivar of olives grown primarily in Provence. Though it is used for producing oil, and gives a good yield, it is valued primarily as a table olive. It is produced as a so-called cracked olive, which means that the fruit is cracked to speed up the curing process.

== Extent ==
The Salonenque is particularly common in Provence, especially in the Bouches-du-Rhône. In the Vallée des Baux it makes up over 60% of planted trees (as of 2004). It is also grown in South Australia, primarily in the area around Adelaide.

== Synonyms ==
The cultivar is also known locally under several other names, including Courgeole, Plant de Salon, Salonen, Sauren, Sauzen, Selounen and Varagen.

== Characteristics ==
It is a cultivar of weak vigour, with an erect growth form. The leaves are short and narrow, with an elliptic-lanceolate form. The olives are of medium-high weight, and of an ovoid quite symmetrical shape. They are rounded both at the apex and the base. The stone has a rugose, or wrinkled surface, with a rounded apex, a pointed base, and a mucro.

For use as table olives, the fruit is harvested relatively early, around 10 September. For oil production the harvest is later, in early November. When fully mature, the colour of the fruit is bright green.

== Processing ==
The primary use of the Salonenque is as a table olive, more specifically as cracked olives (olives that are slit during the curing for the process to go faster). They cured olives are "fresh with a firm, meaty texture and a whiff of aromatic fennel". It is also used for production of oil, and gives a high yield (22–25%). The taste of the oil is sweet and delicate, and quite strong. The olive is freestone – the stone does not cling to the flesh. The Salonenque is used in several officially approved appellations: such as "AOC Vallée des Baux" and "AOC Pays d'Aix".

== Agronomy ==
Salonenque is considered a cultivar of high and constant production, but has a low rooting ability. The Salonenque is partially self-fertile, but it can take advantage of nearby pollinators, among which are the Grossane and the Berruguette.

It has a high level of resistance to the major pests, with the exception of grubs of the olive moth Prays oleae and of the olive fruit fly Bactrocera oleae. It has a good resistance also to cold, and can sustain temperatures down to −15 °C, but it is highly sensitive to wind.
