= Metaphycus helvolus =

Scientific classification
- Kingdom: Animalia
- Phylum: Arthropoda
- Class: Insecta
- Order: Hymenoptera
- Family: Encyrtidae
- Genus: Metaphycus
- Species: M. helvolus

Binomial name
- Metaphycus helvolus (Compere, 1926)

Species of wasp

Metaphycus helvolus is a species of parasitic wasp in the family Encyrtidae native to South Africa. It is a parasitoid of soft scale insects and has been used in their biological control in California and Australia.

== Description ==
Metaphycus helvolus is a tiny insect, the adult female being yellowish-orange and about 1 mm (3/64 in) long.

== Ecology ==
The adult female Metaphycus helvolus seeks out suitable scale hosts. Its most important host is Mediterranean black scale (Saissetia oleae), but it also parasitises brown soft scale (Coccus hesperidum), nigra scale (Parasaissetia nigra), hemispherical scale (Saissetia coffeae) and European fruit lecanium (Parthenolecanium corni). Choosing a first instar to early third instar nymph, it punctures the cuticle with its ovipositor and lays an egg inside. This process takes several minutes, and is more likely to be successfully completed where there are no ants tending the scale insects. The wasp larva develops inside the scale nymph, killing it in the process, and emerges through a round hole that it chews. The wasp has several generations per year in mild climates, which is a faster reproduction rate than that of black scale. Adult wasps also feed on scale insect nymphs, puncturing them and consuming the liquid that exudes from the pierced hole.

== Use in biological control ==
The black scale is a serious pest of citrus in the Mediterranean region, East Africa, California, Mexico, Chile and Australia; in 1926 it was estimated to be causing over two million dollars' worth of damage in California each year. When M. helvolus was introduced into the state in 1937, it reduced black scale dramatically so that within four years, less than 1% of the citrus plantations had economically damaging populations of the scale insect. Following this success, the wasp was introduced into South Australia in 1942 and was effective in reducing the scale on citrus in Australia to the status of a minor pest.
