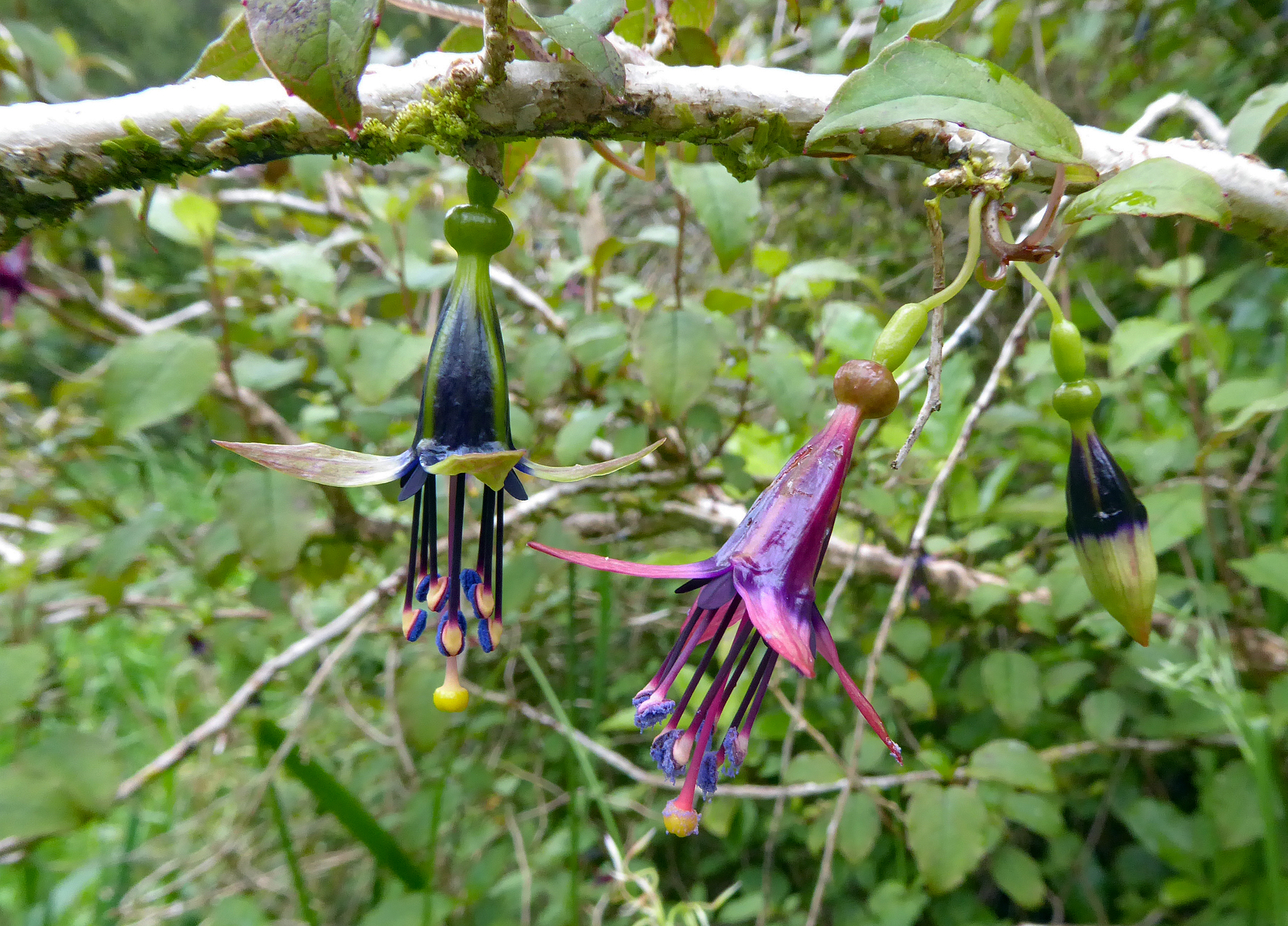

Scientific classification
- Kingdom: Plantae
- Clade: Embryophytes
- Clade: Tracheophytes
- Clade: Angiosperms
- Clade: Eudicots
- Clade: Rosids
- Order: Myrtales
- Family: Onagraceae
- Genus: Fuchsia
- Species: F. perscandens

Binomial name
- Fuchsia perscandens Cockayne & Allan

= Fuchsia perscandens =

Species of flowering plant

Fuchsia perscandens, commonly known as climbing fuchsia or scrambling fuchsia, is a species of plant endemic to New Zealand and belonging to the family Onagraceae. Fuchsia perscandens belongs to the South Pacific Skinnera section, which consists of three species and a hybrid.

The name of this species comes from the Latin scandere, which means 'climbing', referring to the growth of the plant.

== Description ==
Fuchsia perscandens is a semi-trailing, climbing shrub, also defined as a scrambling liane. According to Godley and Berry and Wilson, the plant’s appearance depends on the support it gets. The primary shoot starts growing up without support, then climbs bushes or crawls on the ground to find some support. Fuchsia perscandens can form a shrub in exposed situations or adopt a lianoid form.

The plant has thick main stems, with a diameter of up to 5 cm (2.0 in) and a length of about 5 m (16 ft). Fuchsia perscandens is sparingly branched, and its bark is pale brown, or pale orange-fawn on older stems. The bark tends to peel off in papery-thin flakes and strips, and the small branches are hairy at first.

=== Leaves ===
The leaves are suborbicular, measure about 3 cm (1.2 in) long and 2 cm (0.79 in) wide, and are carried on slender petioles, 10–20 mm (0.39–0.79 in) long. They are thin, green or dark green on the upper side, and glaucescent underneath (paler silvery bluish grey). They are toothed and glabrous, except on veins and margins. The base of the leaf blade is subcordate to truncate, and the apex is subacute.

Webb et al. describe the leaves as deciduous, but according to Godley and Berry, even if exposed plants lose their leaves at the beginning of winter, they might only lose their foliage for a few weeks if located in the shade, and specimens have been observed in full leaf in July on the North Island.

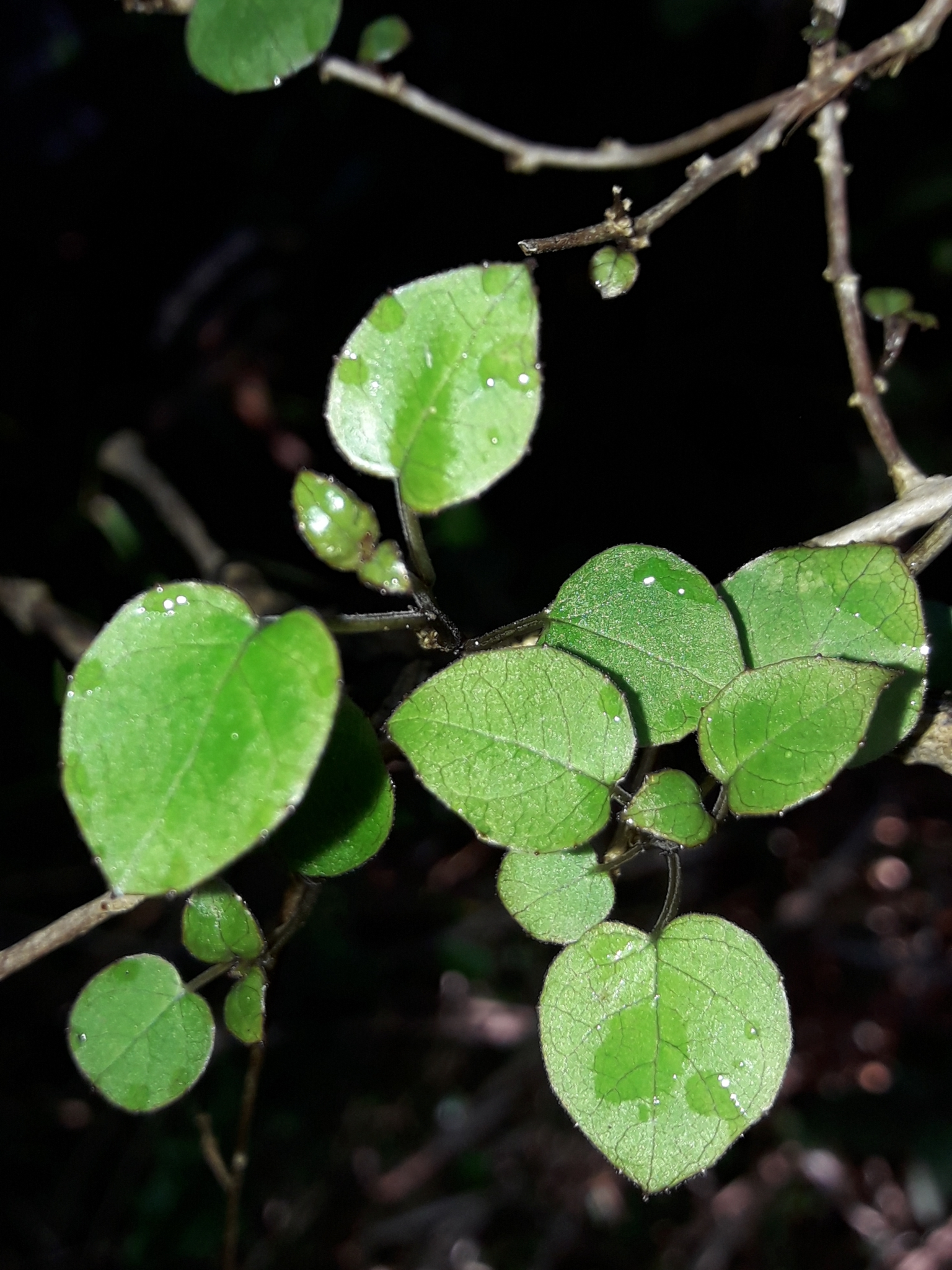
Its leaves

=== Flowers ===
Fuchsia perscandens is a gynodioecious species, which means that some plants bear female flowers and others hermaphrodite flowers (with both male and female parts). In this case, female flowers are smaller than hermaphrodites.

The flowers are pendant, or drooping, and measure 1–3 cm (0.39–1.18 in) long. They are often produced singly, but there can sometimes be a set of two or three flowers. They are supported by very slender pedicels. They can appear directly from the trunk, but also from the short stems holding the leaves.

The floral tube is 7–15 mm (0.28–0.59 in) long, 2–4 mm (0.079–0.157 in) wide, and green shading into a reddish brown. The sepals are 6–10 mm (0.24–0.39 in) long, in a narrow-ovate form. They are reddish brown as well, but shade out to green at the center and the tips, with red streaks. They can be patent to reflexed.

The petals on the corolla are 1–6 mm (0.039–0.236 in) long and narrow-oblong. They are initially green and dark purple, and red appears when the flowers age.

These flowers are very similar to those of Fuchsia excorticata, also called tree fuchsia, in a smaller version.

Hermaphroditic flowers are the only ones bearing stamens. Stamens are prominent, with filaments 10–15 mm (0.39–0.59 in) long and a purple color. According to Godley and Berry, female flowers still have shorter filaments, but their anthers are aborted. The flowers present a capitate stigma, meaning that its head is rounded. The stigma is yellow or green, 1–2 mm thick, held by a 20–30 mm long style which is pale cream to purple.

=== Berries ===
Fuchsia perscandens produces small berries. They are subcylindrical (imperfectly cylindrical) and measure 5–10 mm (0.20–0.39 in). They are red to purple and ripen to a very dark purple. These berries are not as prolific as those of Fuchsia excorticata.

The seeds are oblong-triangular, 0.8–0.9 mm (0.031–0.035 in) long, and 0.4–0.6 mm (0.016–0.024 in) wide.

== Geographic distribution ==
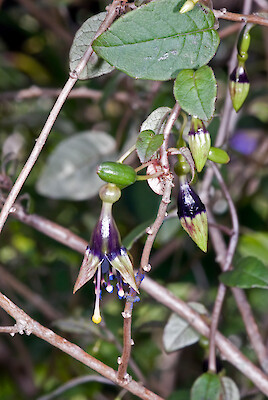
Fuchsia perscandens' flowers

Fuchsia perscandens is endemic to New Zealand. It is found on both main islands of New Zealand but is not common.

The species is not found in the warmer northern part of the North Island. Even if specimens were recorded north of Auckland during the 19th century, they probably disappeared with deforestation.

It is thought that Fuchsia perscandens was once common in the lower Waikato area, at the base of trees in the white pine (Dacrycarpus dacrydioides) forests. A few plants are left in that area, but the species has become rare. This is now believed to be the most northerly location of Fuchsia perscandens.

== Habitat preferences ==
Fuchsia perscandens is usually found in forests (especially in clearings or at forest edges), coastal shrub and shrubland. Sometimes, the species is found among rocks in the open, and the altitude at which it grows ranges from sea level to 750 m.

Fuchsia perscandens's preferred habitats are river terraces and remnants of white pine swamp forest, but the species has also been found in limestone, for example in the Wairarapa or in Marlborough.

== Ecology ==
=== Life cycle and phenology ===
Fuchsia perscandens flowers from July or August to December. Godley and Berry collected more flowering plants in October and November, with 14 and 7 specimens respectively in each month. Open flowers last about 11 days, during which they change color, passing from green with purple streaks to deep purple.

Fuchsia perscandens can multiply in two ways: by seed (sexual reproduction) and by division (asexual reproduction).

Sweetman explains that Fuchsia perscandens has a generally spreading habit: shoots layer themselves and give rise to new plants.

Sexual reproduction takes place after pollination, when fruits are formed. The seeds are dispersed by animals consuming the berries. This process is called endozoochory. The flesh of the berries attracts the animals and acts as a reward, encouraging them to come back.

Wilson states that there is not enough information available regarding the period during which Fuchsia perscandens produces fruit, although Eagle observed some berries on a Taumarunui reserve in December.

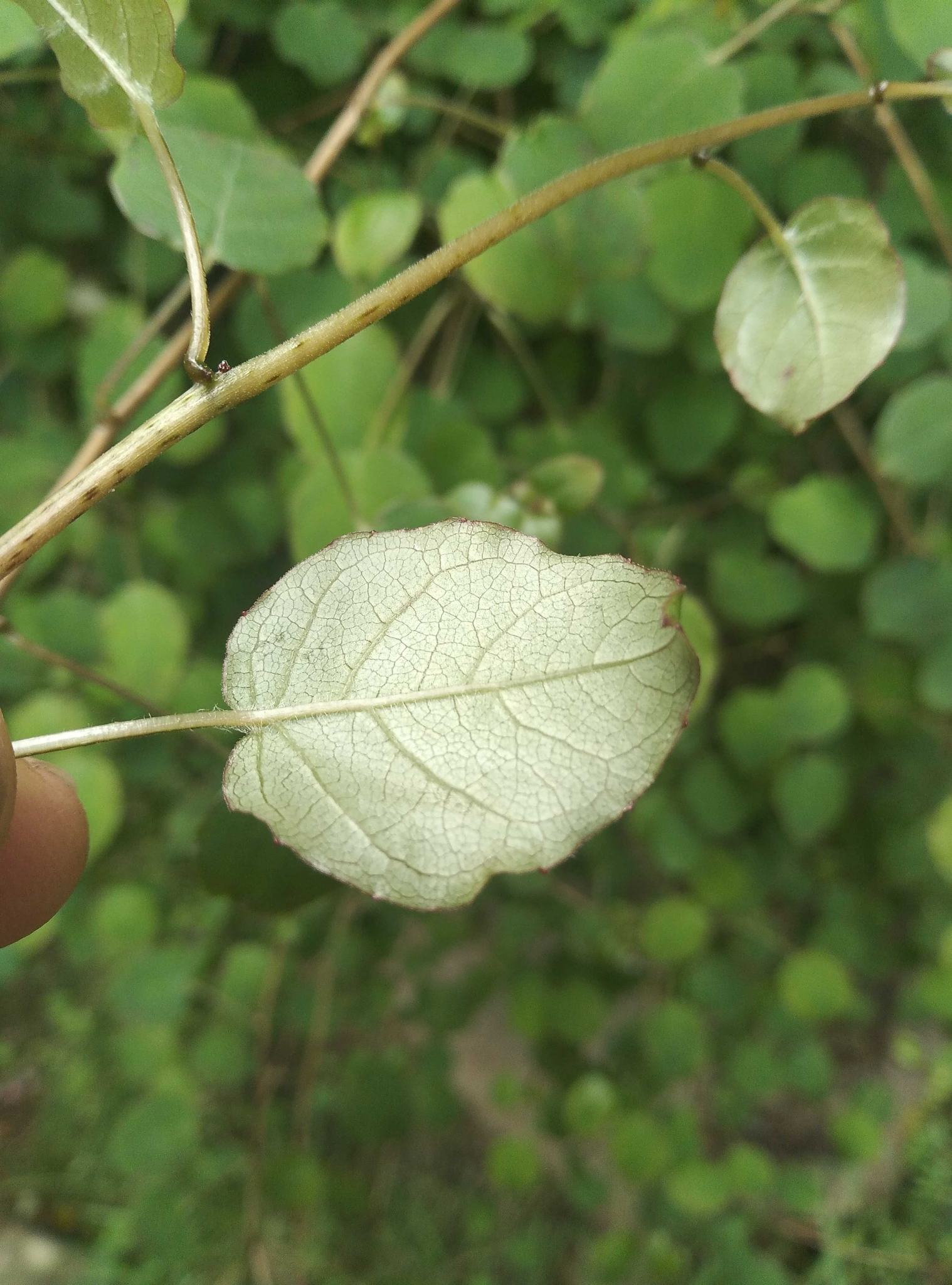
Abaxial surface

=== Parasites and diseases ===
Limited information is available on the parasites and diseases of Fuchsia perscandens.

It has been reported as being a host plant for two herbivore species on Plant-SyNZ: Cephalissa siria Meyrick, 1883, a moth species in the family Geometridae, endemic to New Zealand, whose caterpillars feed on the leaves of Fuchsia perscandens; and Saissetia oleae Olivier, 1791, a scale insect in the family Coccidae. This sucking bug lives on leaves and twigs, and a nymph scale has been found on a leaf of Fuchsia perscandens.

The plant’s berries are also likely to attract animals. In New Zealand, the predominant frugivores are birds and reptiles. Godley and Berry suggested that bellbirds, tuis, black birds and thrushes probably eat and disperse the berries of Fuchsia perscandens, since they already eat the very similar berries of Fuchsia excorticata.

== Other information ==
Fuchsia perscandens has been classified as a non-endangered species by the New Zealand Department of Conservation, which means that its population is stable.

Fuchsia perscandens can hybridise with Fuchsia excorticata (tree fuchsia), resulting in the hybrid Fuchsia × colensoi, called shrubby fuchsia. The latter can cross back with both of its parents, which creates a lot of variation. According to Wilson, shrubby fuchsia is a little more common than Fuchsia perscandens on Banks Peninsula but much less common than Fuchsia excorticata.
