= Baphala =

Scientific classification
- Kingdom: Animalia
- Phylum: Arthropoda
- Class: Insecta
- Order: Lepidoptera
- Family: Pyralidae
- Subfamily: Phycitinae
- Genus: Baphala; Heinrich, 1956

Genus of moths

Baphala is a genus of snout moths. It was described by Carl Heinrich in 1956.

== Species ==
- Baphala homoeosomella (Zeller, 1881)
- Baphala eremiella (Dyar, 1910)
- Baphala glabrella (Dyar, 1919)
- Baphala goyensis
- Baphala haywardi
- Baphala pallida (Comstock, 1880)
- Baphala phaeolella Neunzig, 1997
