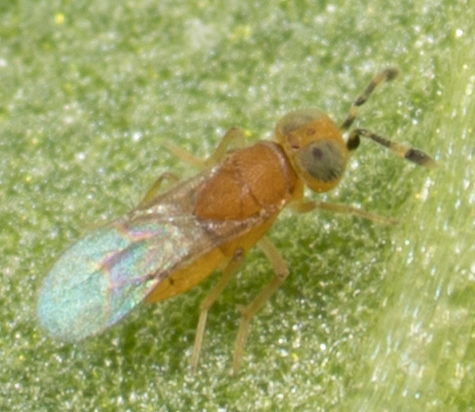
- Metaphycus sp., California

Scientific classification
- Kingdom: Animalia
- Phylum: Arthropoda
- Clade: Pancrustacea
- Class: Insecta
- Order: Hymenoptera
- Family: Encyrtidae
- Genus: Metaphycus; Mayr, 1917

= Metaphycus =

Genus of wasps

Metaphycus is a genus of wasps belonging to the family Encyrtidae.

The genus has cosmopolitan distribution.

== Species ==
Species:

- Metaphycus acanthococci Myartseva, 1984
- Metaphycus acanthococci Myartseva, 1987
- Metaphycus aegle Noyes, 2004
- Metaphycus alberti (Howard, 1898)
- Metaphycus dorsalis
- Metaphycus helvolus Compere, 1926
- Metaphycus nadius (Walker, 1838)
- Metaphycus xujiangi Özdikmen, 2011
