= Baphala haywardi =

Scientific classification
- Domain: Eukaryota
- Kingdom: Animalia
- Phylum: Arthropoda
- Class: Insecta
- Order: Lepidoptera
- Family: Pyralidae
- Genus: Baphala
- Species: B. haywardi

Binomial name
- Baphala haywardi Heinrich, 1956

Synonyms
- Zophodia haywardi

Species of moth

Baphala haywardi is a species of snout moth in the genus Baphala. It was described by Carl Heinrich in 1956 and is found in Argentina.

The wingspan is 15–16 mm.

The larvae feed on the scale insect Ceroplastes grandis.
