= Baphala glabrella =

Scientific classification
- Domain: Eukaryota
- Kingdom: Animalia
- Phylum: Arthropoda
- Class: Insecta
- Order: Lepidoptera
- Family: Pyralidae
- Genus: Baphala
- Species: B. glabrella

Binomial name
- Baphala glabrella (Dyar, 1919)

Synonyms
- Euzophera glabrella Dyar, 1919

Species of moth

Baphala glabrella is a species of snout moth in the genus Baphala. It was described by Harrison Gray Dyar Jr. in 1919, and is found in Guatemala.

The wingspan is 15–16 mm. Adults are suffused, grayish brown with obscure markings. The pale transverse antemedial and subterminal lines and the dark discal dots are faintly indicated.

The larvae probably feed on scale insects.
