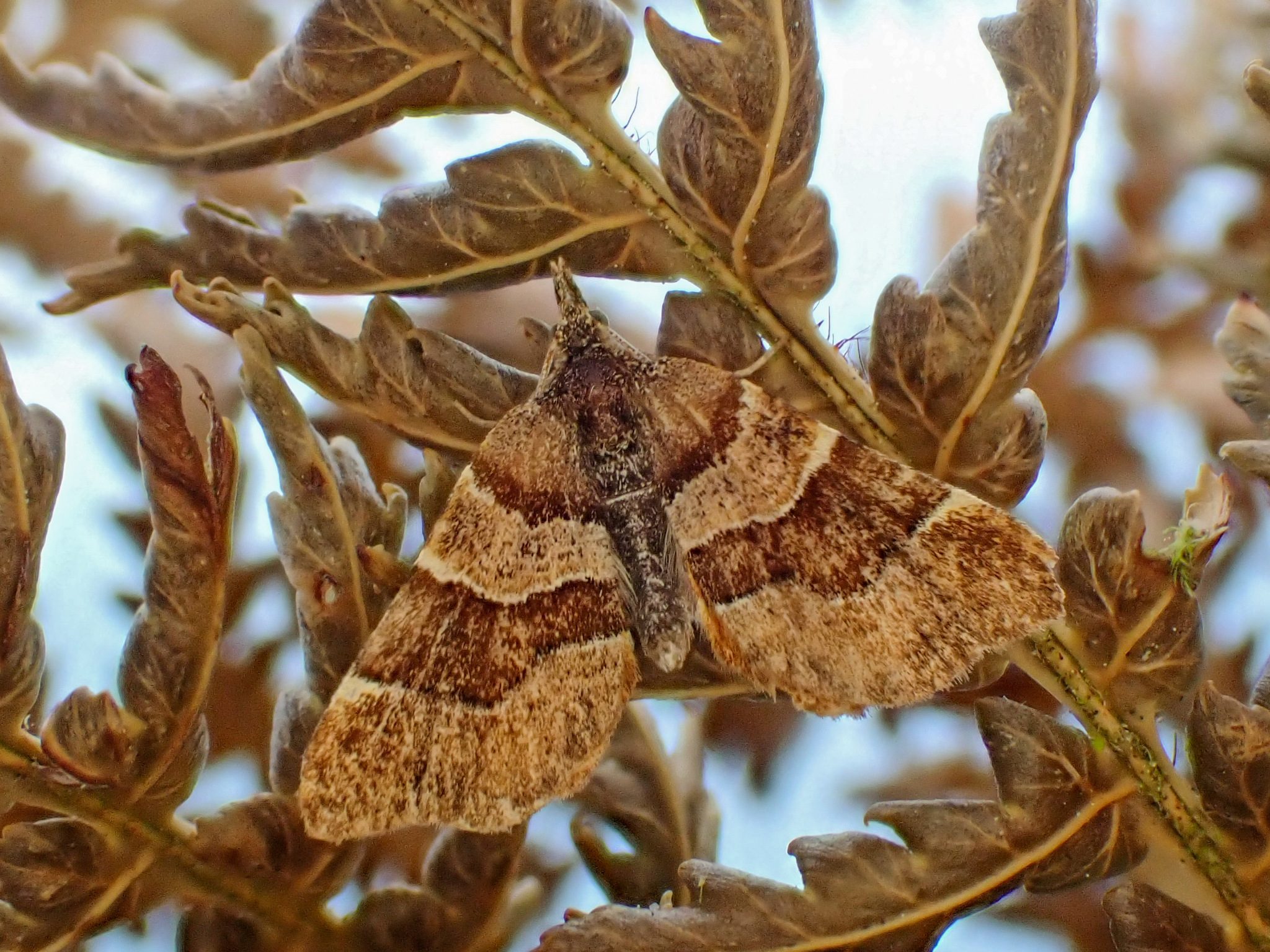
- A male Cephalissa siria found in the Otago Region

Conservation status
- Nationally Endangered (NZ TCS)

Scientific classification
- Kingdom: Animalia
- Phylum: Arthropoda
- Clade: Pancrustacea
- Class: Insecta
- Order: Lepidoptera
- Family: Geometridae
- Subfamily: Larentiinae
- Genus: Cephalissa; Meyrick, 1883
- Species: C. siria

Binomial name
- Cephalissa siria Meyrick, 1883

Synonyms
- Hydriomena siria (Meyrick, 1883)

= Cephalissa =

Genus of moths

Cephalissa is a monotypic moth genus in the family Geometridae. Its only species, Cephalissa siria, the orange triangle moth, is endemic to New Zealand. C. siria inhabits kahikatea forest amongst Carex species as well as short tussock grasslands and shrubland. The larval host plant is Fuchsia perscandens. Adult moths are on the wing in October and November.

In 2025 this species was classified as nationally endangered by the Department of Conservation as it is impacted by climate change, is data poor, has population fragmentation and is range restricted. C. siria is regarded as being in a worse state than in 2015 when it was classified as nationally vulnerable. It has suffered a contraction of its range, no longer being seen in Dunedin or Invercargill. It is currently found in the Mt Watkin Scenic Reserve, in eastern Otago, in the Rongahere Gorge and in the Dansey Ecological District.

== Taxonomy ==
This genus and species were first described by Edward Meyrick in 1883 using specimens collected by Frederick Hutton in Dunedin. In 1884 Meyrick described both the genus and the species in greater detail. In 1898 George Vernon Hudson described and illustrated the species under the name Hydriomena siria. Hudson also used the same synonym when he described and illustrated the species in his 1928 publication. John S. Dugdale also discussed the species in 1971 and placed this species in the genus Hydriomena was in doubt. In 1988 Dugdale confirmed this placement. The lectotype specimen, collected in Dunedin, is held at the Natural History Museum, London.

== Description ==
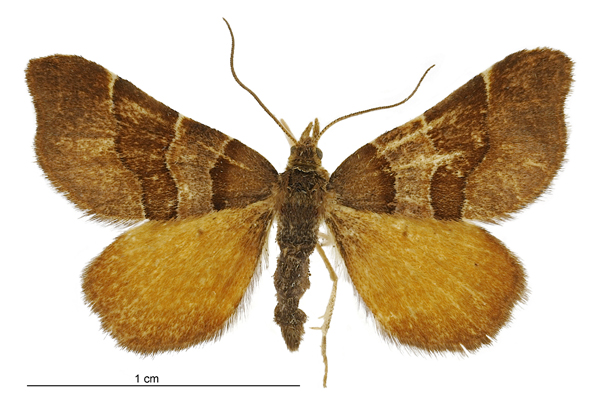
Male specimen from the New Zealand Arthropod Collection.

Meyrick described the species as follows:

16-18 mm. Forewings moderate, costa sinuate, hind-margin strongly sinuate; rather dark reddish-fuscous, markings darker; a narrow curved fascia towards base, posteriorly obscurely edged with yellowish-white; a median band, moderately broad on costa, much narrower towards inner margin, both margins obscurely edged with yellowish-white, only distinct on costa, anterior margin sinuate, posterior margin sinuate, somewhat projecting in middle; an indistinct suffusion towards apex. Hindwings moderate, hindmargin irregular, obtusely projecting in middle; bright deep orange, tinged with reddish-fuscous on hindmargin; cilia dark fuscous.

== Distribution ==
This species is endemic to New Zealand. Along with the type locality of Dunedin, Hudson noted that the species was also present at the Waihopai Scenic Reserve near Invercargill. In 1939 Hudson mentioned that the species was present in the Waianiwa and Takitimu mountains in Southland. However since that time C. siria has suffered a contraction of its range. It is no longer seen in Dunedin nor Invercargill, but is still present in eastern Otago and in the Rongahere Gorge on the Clutha River. It has been located in the Dansey Ecological District which is regarded to be the northern limit of its range. The species has also been located at the Mt Watkin Scenic Reserve, north of Dunedin.

== Habitat ==
Hudson stated that the species was seen in kahikatea forest amongst Carex species. C. siria is also known to inhabit the short tussock grasslands and shrubland in the Dansey Ecological District.

== Biology and life cycle ==
The adult moths are on the wing in October and November.

== Host species ==
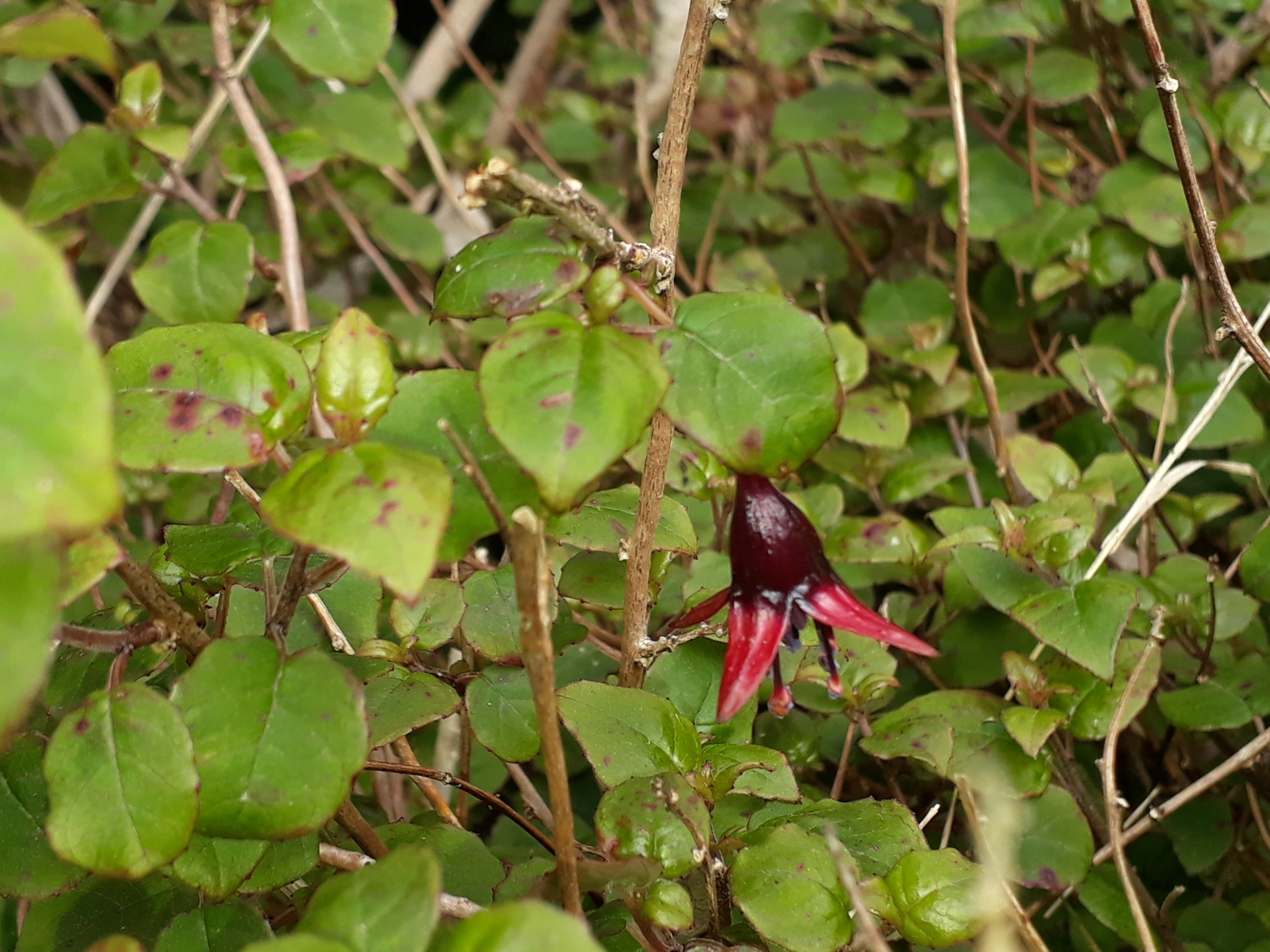
Larval host plant Fuchsia perscandens.

The host plant for the larvae of this species is Fuchsia perscandens.

== Conservation status ==
In 2025 this species was classified by the New Zealand Department of Conservation as nationally endangered under the New Zealand Threat Classification System. C. siria is considered to be in a worse conservation state than when it was classified as nationally vulnerable in 2015. This is despite the Department of Conservation included C. siria in 2017 in a list of 150 species to be prioritised for conservation.

According to the 2025 classification C. siria impacted by climate change, is in need of conservation research as the species has a lack of data on both the population size as well as how the population is changing over time, has population fragmentation and is range restricted.
