= Baphala phaeolella =

Scientific classification
- Domain: Eukaryota
- Kingdom: Animalia
- Phylum: Arthropoda
- Class: Insecta
- Order: Lepidoptera
- Family: Pyralidae
- Genus: Baphala
- Species: B. phaeolella

Binomial name
- Baphala phaeolella Neunzig, 1997

Species of moth

Baphala phaeolella is a species of snout moth in the genus Baphala. It was described by Herbert H. Neunzig in 1997 and is found in North America, including Maryland, Mississippi and West Virginia.

The larvae probably feed on scale insects.
