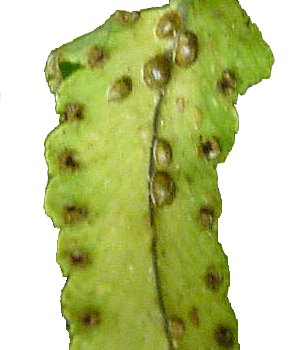

Scientific classification
- Domain: Eukaryota
- Kingdom: Animalia
- Phylum: Arthropoda
- Class: Insecta
- Order: Hemiptera
- Suborder: Sternorrhyncha
- Family: Coccidae
- Genus: Saissetia
- Species: S. coffeae

Binomial name
- Saissetia coffeae (Walker, 1852)

Synonyms
- Lecanium coffeae Walker, 1852

= Saissetia coffeae =

Species of true bug

Saissetia coffeae, known generally as hemispherical scale, is a species of soft scale insect in the family Coccidae. Other common names include the helmet scale and coffee brown scale.

== Description ==
The adult scale varies in diameter from about 2 mm (0.08 in) to 4.5 mm (0.18 in), largely depending on the identity of the host plant. It is smooth, shiny and brown and closely adpressed to a stem or leaf, resembling a miniature military helmet. Young scales often have a slightly ridged surface, sometimes in the form of a "H". Like other scale insects, the hemispherical scale has no limbs and is immobile, piercing the plant tissues with its mouthparts and feeding on sap.

== Distribution ==
Saissetia coffeae is present in West, Central and East Africa, Madagascar, tropical and subtropical Asia, North, Central and South America and the Caribbean region.

== Life cycle ==
All hemispherical scale insects are female, and breeding occurs by parthenogenesis. The eggs are pinkish-beige, oblong and about 0.7 mm (0.03 in) long. Up to a thousand eggs are laid, and they remain concealed under the scale husk, the parent dying soon after they are laid. The eggs hatch into first instars known as "crawlers", the only mobile phase in this species, which leave the shelter of the mother's scale to disperse. They have short antennae and limbs, a pair of red eyespots, and a pair of long setae (bristles) at the back. When they have reached a suitable spot, they plunge their mouthparts into the plant, shed their skin and develop into second instar nymphs. There is a further instar stage before the adult stage is reached, the whole development period taking forty days or more. There may be several generations each year.

== Ecology ==
The hemispherical scale attacks many different plants including crops such as coffee, tea, sugar apple and pumpkin, greenhouse plants and ornamental shrubs, being found on the stems, leaves and fruits. It produces copious amounts of honeydew which encourages the growth of sooty mould, and also causes leaf fall and the stunting of shoots on the host plant. It may be attended by ants which feed on the honeydew and protect the scales from their natural enemies. It is attacked by parasitoids, such as those that have been introduced in various parts of the world to control Saissetia oleae, a serious pest of olive trees.
