= Aglandau =

Olive cultivar

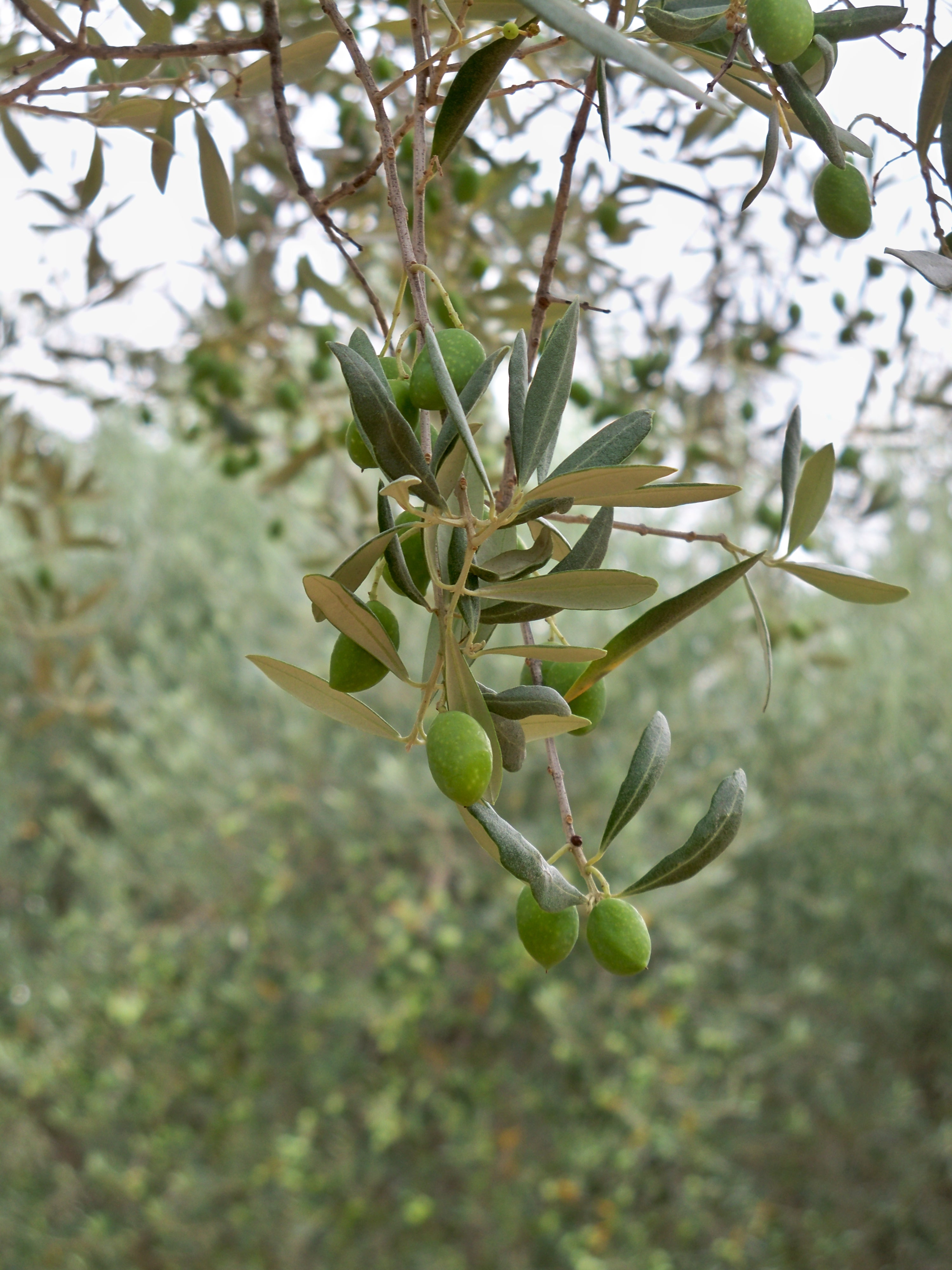

Olive (Olea europaea)
- Color of the ripe fruit: Green
- Also called: Beruguette, Blanquette, Plant d'Aix, Verdale de Carpentras
- Origin: France
- Notable regions: Provence
- Hazards: Saissetia oleae, sooty mold, Spilocaea oleaginea
- Use: Oil and table
- Oil content: High
- Fertility: Self-sterile
- Growth form: Spreading
- Leaf: Elliptic-lanceolate
- Weight: Medium
- Shape: Ovoid
- Symmetry: Slightly asymmetrical

The Aglandau is one of the more important of approximately a hundred cultivars of olives in France. It is grown primarily in Provence, but also as far away as Azerbaijan and Ukraine. The 'Aglandau' is primarily used for production of oil, but can also be eaten. When used as table olives, the fruit is normally called Beruguette. The oil is highly valued for its fruity taste.

== Extent ==
The 'Aglandau' is common in Provence, particularly in the counties of Aix-en-Provence and Salon-de-Provence. It can also be found in Australia, as well as in Azerbaijan and Ukraine.

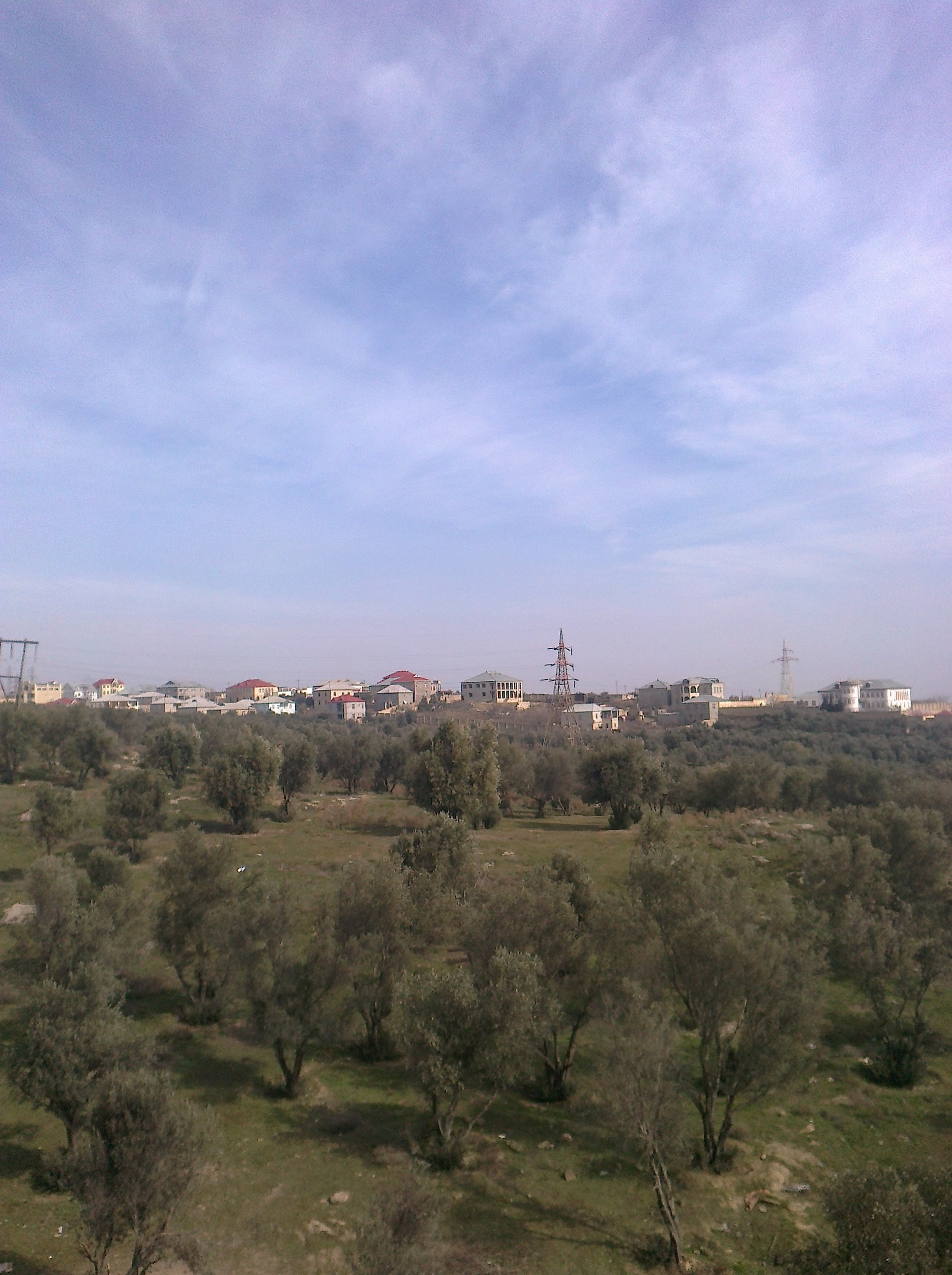
Olive Garden in Zig

== Synonyms ==
Locally, this cultivar is known under a number of different names, including Beruguette, Blanquette, Plant d'Aix, Verdale de Carpentras. In Azerbaijan and Ukraine it is known as Nichitskaia 7. Beruguette is the common name when the 'Aglandau' is served as a table olive.

== Characteristics ==
The 'Aglandau' is a cultivar of medium-to-weak vigour. Its growth form is spreading with a dense canopy, and the leaves are flat and elliptic-lanceolate, of medium length and width. The olives are of relatively low weight, with a rounded apex and a truncated base. They are slightly asymmetrical, and ovoid in shape. The stone has a rugose surface, with a rounded apex and a pointed base.

The cultivar is harvested in November and December, before the frost, which can harm the fruit. The trees are often maintained quite low, for ease of access at harvest. This is necessary because the olives are firmly attached to the branches. When fully mature, the colour of the fruit is green. The olive is clingstone – the stone clings to the flesh.

== Processing ==
A dual-use cultivar, the 'Aglandau' is primarily used for extraction of oil, and gives a good yield (19–23%). The taste of the oil is highly valued, and is considered to have a particularly fruity taste. The smell of the oil has alternately been described as "almond", "green apple", and "artichoke". The cultivar is used in several officially approved appellations: such as "AOC Haute Provence", "AOC Pays d'Aix" and "AOC Vallée de Baux".

== Agronomy ==
It is considered a cultivar of medium productivity, with good rooting ability. It has a tendency towards biennial bearing, i.e. that a good yield is followed by a weaker one the next year. This can to a large extent be controlled through pruning.

There is a certain disagreement over the fertility of the 'Aglandau' trees, but generally they are considered self-sterile, so it can take advantage of other local varieties as pollinators.

It is vulnerable to certain biological pests, such as the black scale insect of olives Saissetia oleae, sooty mold and the olive leaf-spot fungus Spilocaea oleaginea. Its resistance to the Verticillium dahliae and the Pseudomonas syringae, on the other hand, is good. It has a good tolerance to drought; less so to cold.
