= Grossane =

Olive cultivar

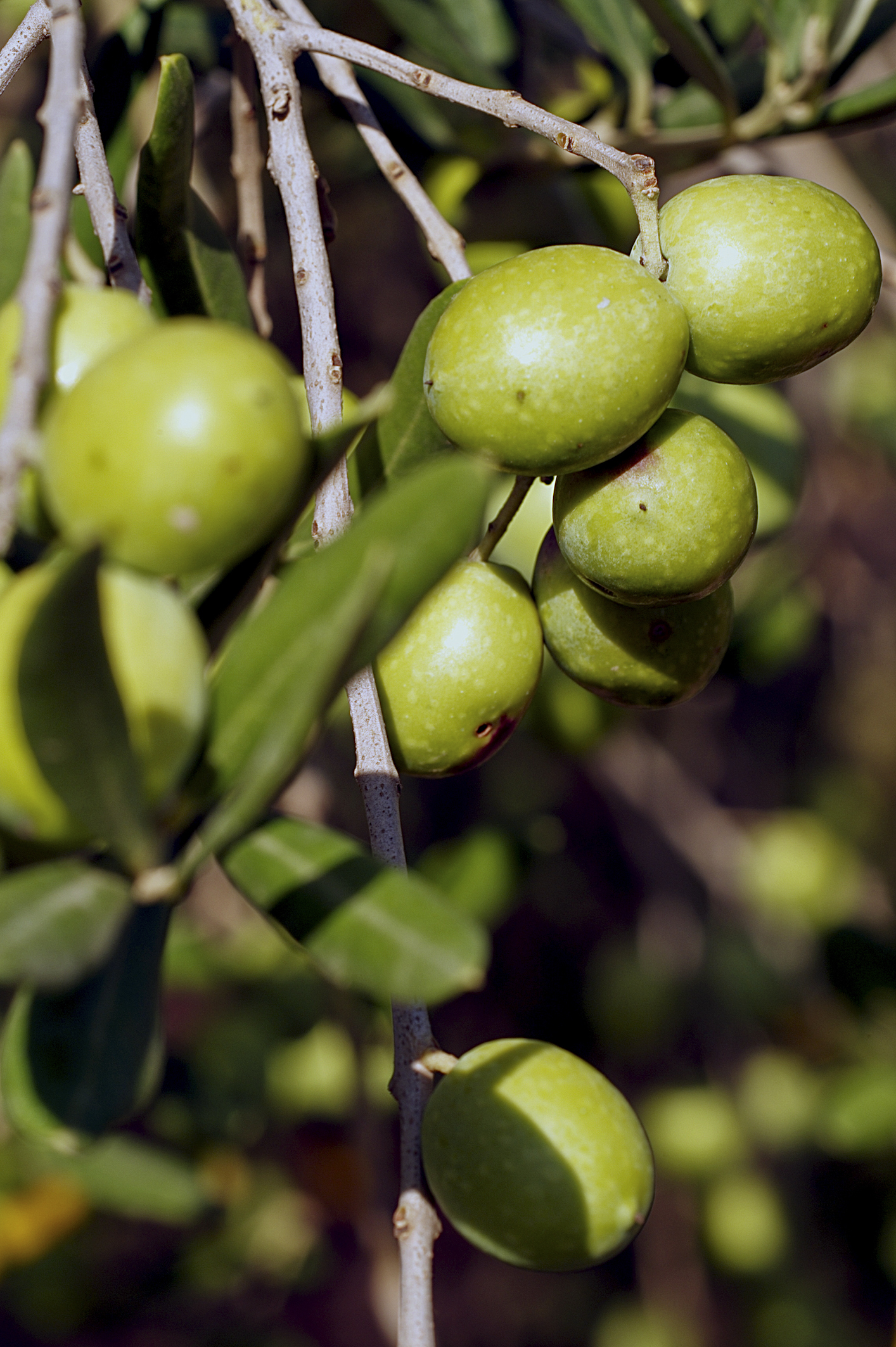
- Grossane from France

Olive (Olea europaea)
- Color of the ripe fruit: Black
- Also called: Groussan, Grossanne
- Origin: France
- Notable regions: Vallée des Baux, Bouches-du-Rhône
- Hazards: Olive fruit fly, Prays oleae, Sooty moulds
- Use: Oil and table
- Oil content: Low
- Fertility: Self-sterile
- Growth form: Spreading
- Leaf: Lanceolate
- Weight: High
- Shape: Spherical
- Symmetry: Slightly asymmetrical

The Grossane is a cultivar of olives grown primarily in the Vallée des Baux and Bouches-du-Rhône regions of southern France. Though it can be used to produce oil, it is primarily used as a black table olive. Vulnerable to certain biological pests, it is highly resistant to cold and drought.

== Extent ==
The Grossane is particularly common in the Vallée des Baux and Bouches-du-Rhône regions of southern France. It can also be found as far away as China.

== Synonyms ==
This cultivar is not known under any synonyms, though the spelling differs somewhat locally (Groussan, Grossanne).

== Characteristics ==
It is a cultivar of middle strength, with a spreading growth form and leaves of lanceolate shape and medium length and width. The olives are of high weight, ovoid shape and slightly asymmetrical. The stone has a rounded apex and a pointed base, with a rough surface and a mucro.

The Grossane an intermediate cultivar in terms of flowering and ripening. When fully mature, the colour of the fruit is black.

== Processing ==
Though a dual use cultivar, the Grossane is primarily used as a table olive. The black olives have a sweet taste, and the fruit is freestone—the stone does not cling to the flesh. It can also be used for the extraction of oil, but it gives a poor yield, and the oil has a short shelf-life. The oil is said to have a "delicate flavor with a citrus aroma and slight fruitiness", while others compare it to tomatoes.

== Agronomy ==
Its productivity is only intermediate, but this can be improved by the use of irrigation and fertilization. The Grossane has poor rooting ability, and is often grafted. It is self-sterile, and needs other pollinators. Cultivars used for pollination are the Boutellian and Aglandau.

It has low resistance to certain biological pests, such as the olive fruit fly, Bactrocera oleae and sooty moulds. On the other hand, it has high tolerance to cold and drought.
