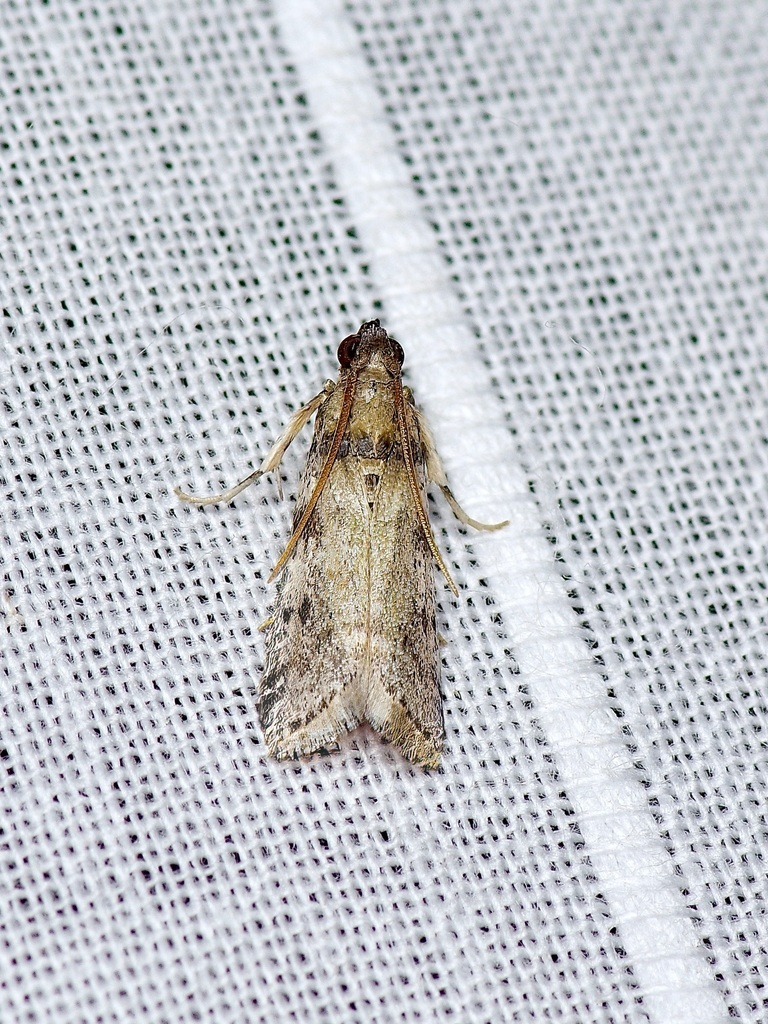

Scientific classification
- Domain: Eukaryota
- Kingdom: Animalia
- Phylum: Arthropoda
- Class: Insecta
- Order: Lepidoptera
- Family: Pyralidae
- Genus: Baphala
- Species: B. pallida

Binomial name
- Baphala pallida (Comstock, 1880)

Synonyms
- Dakrum pallida Comstock, 1880; Vitula basimaculatella Ragonot, 1887; Baphala basimaculatella; Baphala basimaculella Hulst, 1890

= Baphala pallida =

Species of moth

Baphala pallida is a species of snout moth in the genus Baphala. It was described by John Henry Comstock in 1880 and is found in the US states of Texas, Utah, Alabama, Arizona, California, Florida, Maryland, Oklahoma and South Carolina.

The wingspan is 15–19 mm. The forewings are pale whitish gray, but a little darker along the inner margin. The discal dots and transverse dark markings are blackish and strongly contrasted, especially toward the costa.

The larvae feed on scale insects.

== Taxonomy ==
The species was previously known as Baphala basimaculatella. The name pallida was listed as a synonym of Laetilia coccidivora.
