= Saissetia =

Scientific classification
- Domain: Eukaryota
- Kingdom: Animalia
- Phylum: Arthropoda
- Class: Insecta
- Order: Hemiptera
- Suborder: Sternorrhyncha
- Family: Coccidae
- Genus: Saissetia; Deplanche, 1858

Genus of true bugs

Saissetia is a genus of soft scale insects in the family Coccidae. There are at least four described species in Saissetia.

== Species ==
- Saissetia coffeae (Walker, 1852) (hemispherical scale)
- Saissetia miranda (Cockerell and Parrott, 1899)
- Saissetia neglecta De Lotto, 1969
- Saissetia oleae (Olivier, 1791)
