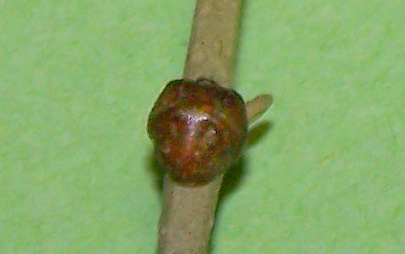

Scientific classification
- Kingdom: Animalia
- Phylum: Arthropoda
- Clade: Pancrustacea
- Class: Insecta
- Order: Hemiptera
- Suborder: Sternorrhyncha
- Family: Coccidae
- Genus: Saissetia
- Species: S. oleae

Binomial name
- Saissetia oleae (Olivier, 1791)

Synonyms
- Coccus oleae Olivier, 1791

= Saissetia oleae =

Species of true bug

Saissetia oleae (syn. Coccus oleae) is a scale insect in the family Coccidae. It is considered one of the three main phytophagous parasites of the olive tree (Olea europaea), together with the olive fruit fly (Bactrocera oleae) and the olive moth (Prays oleae). Although it is a common parasite which occurs most often in olive trees, it is a polyphagous species, also attacking (but less frequently) citrus trees as well as various ornamental shrubs such as oleanders, pittosporums, sago palm, and euonymus.

== History ==
One of the first scientists who studied the insect in a scientific and modern way was Italian naturalist Giuseppe Maria Giovene. He wrote a publication entitled Descrizione e storia della cocciniglia dell'ulivo (1807) in which he answered Giovanni Presta who had denied the existence of the insect in the Apulian provinces of Bari and Otranto. Giovene showed that the insect was common in the above regions as well, even though it occurred less often. Moreover, Giovene discovered the male of the insect, which at that time wasn't known in Europe. In the Dictionary of Natural History of Paris (1816) (French: Nouveau dictionnaire d'histoire naturelle, appliquée aux arts, à l'agriculture, à l'économie rurale et domestique, à la médecine, etc.) it was written that "the male is not known" (French: Le mâle n'est pas connu).

== Life cycle ==
The soft body of the adult female olive scale is concealed under a dark grey or brownish-black covering which grows and hardens over time. Male scales are not present in most regions and breeding is by parthenogenesis. The female is generally immobile and lays up to 2,500 eggs in batches. The eggs are retained under the scale and hatch into nymphs known as "crawlers". These are mobile, emerging from under the scale and dispersing to other parts of the plant. They moult twice before becoming adult, and all life stages of the insect feed by sucking the sap of the host plant.

== Distribution and hosts ==
Saissetia oleae may have originated in South Africa but has spread around the world and now has a global distribution. It has been recorded feeding on 113 species of plant in 49 families. As well as being a serious pest of olive, it is one of the most important pests of citrus especially in the Mediterranean area, California, Florida and South America. The parasitic wasp Metaphycus helvolus is native to South Africa and has been introduced to California where it has dramatically reduced incidence of this scale in citrus orchards.
