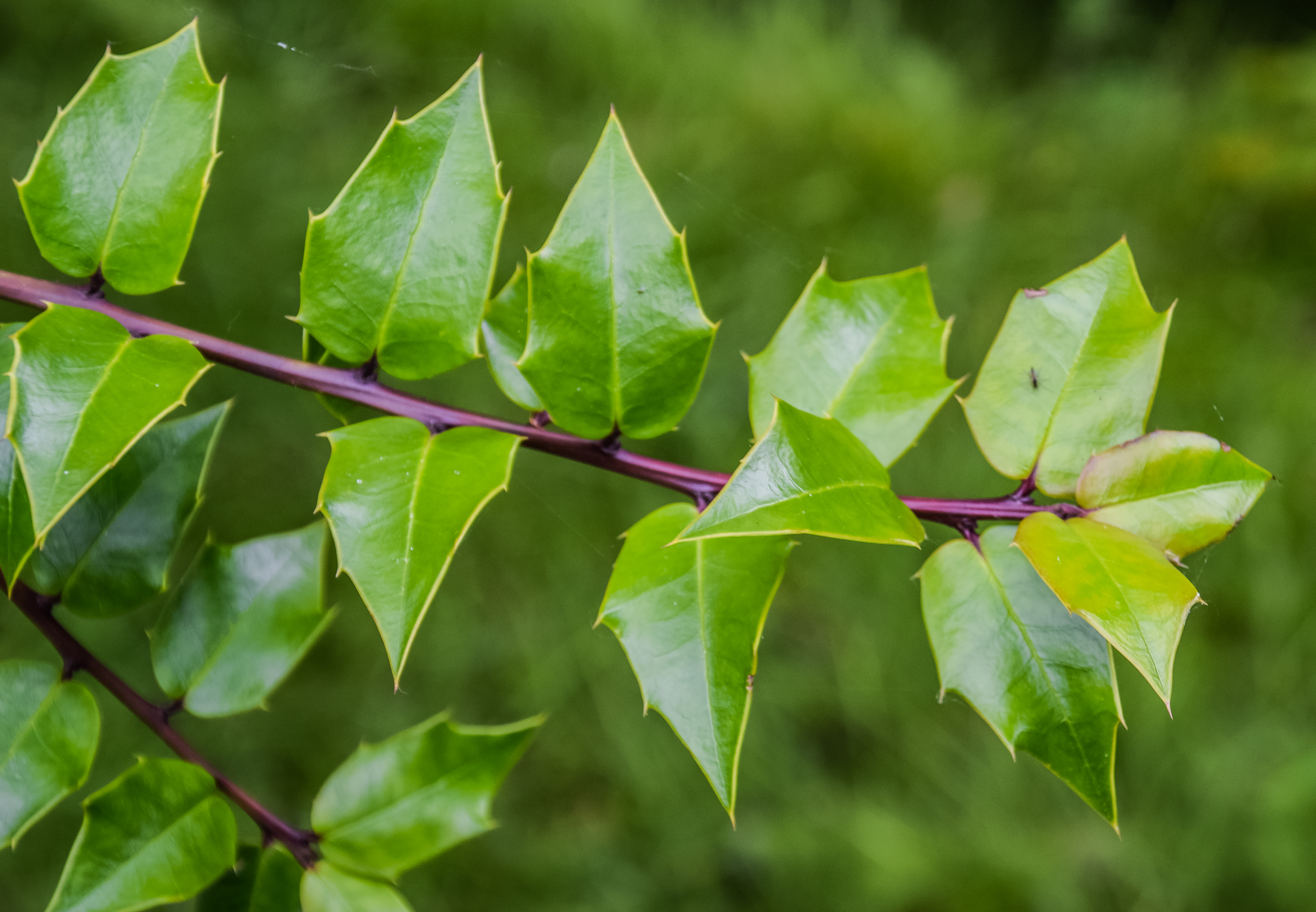
- Foliage

Scientific classification
- Kingdom: Plantae
- Clade: Tracheophytes
- Clade: Angiosperms
- Clade: Eudicots
- Clade: Asterids
- Order: Aquifoliales
- Family: Aquifoliaceae
- Genus: Ilex
- Species: I. bioritsensis

Binomial name
- Ilex bioritsensis Hayata

Synonyms
- Ilex ciliospinosa Loes.; Ilex diplosperma S.Y.Hu

= Ilex bioritsensis =

Species of plant in the holly family

Ilex bioritsensis is a species of holly (family Aquifoliaceae), native to warmer parts of China. Its leaves are fed upon by gray snub-nosed monkeys (Rhinopithecus brelichi).
