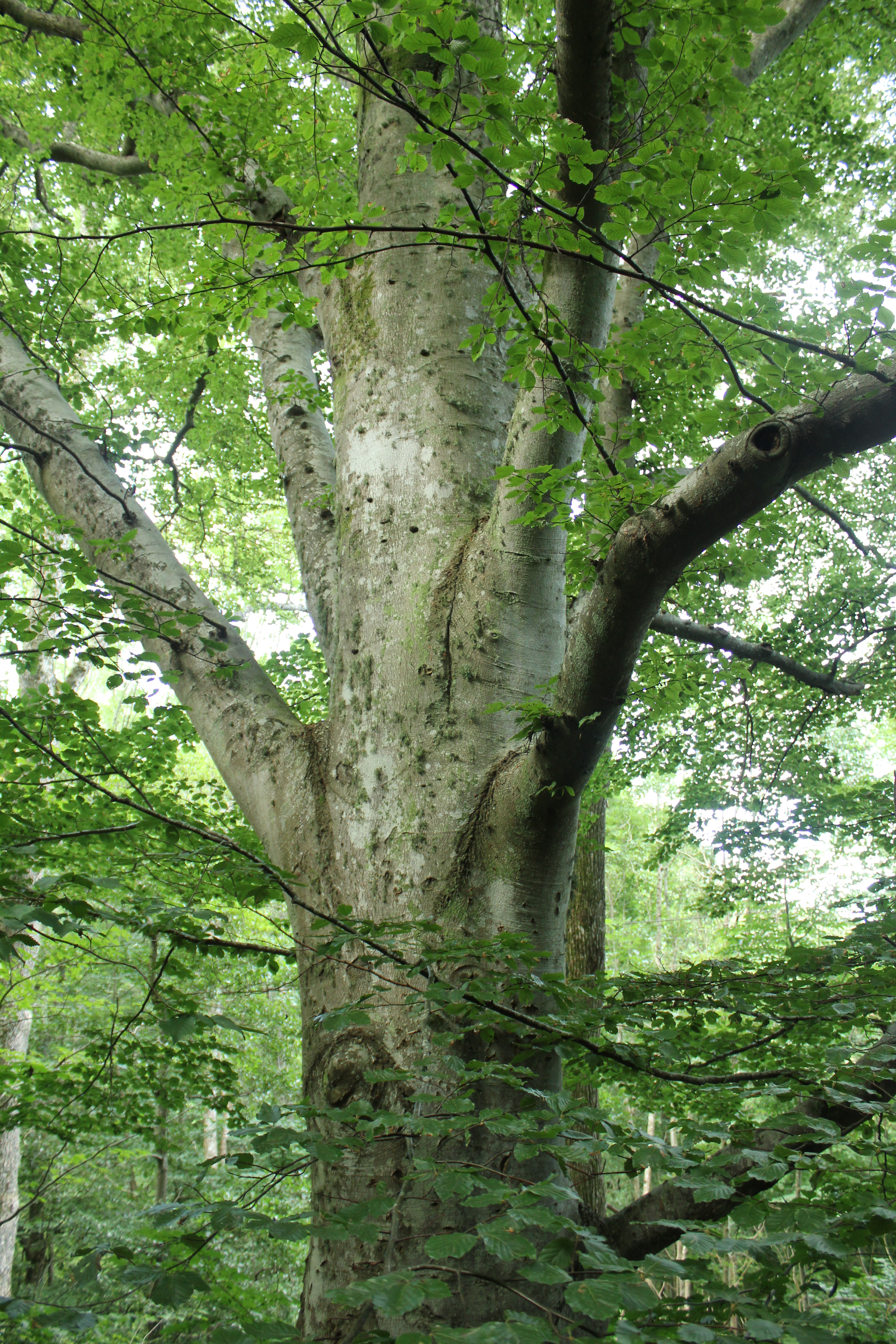
- European beech (Fagus sylvatica)

Scientific classification
- Kingdom: Plantae
- Clade: Tracheophytes
- Clade: Angiosperms
- Clade: Eudicots
- Clade: Rosids
- Order: Fagales
- Family: Fagaceae
- Subfamily: Fagoideae; K.Koch
- Genus: Fagus; L.

Type species
- Fagus sylvatica L.

Species
- See text

= Beech =

Beech Temporal range: 82–0 Ma

Genus of trees in the family Fagaceae

Beech (genus Fagus) is a genus of deciduous trees in the family Fagaceae, native to subtropical (accessory forest element) and temperate (as dominant element of mesophytic forests) Eurasia and North America. There are 14 accepted species in two distinct subgenera, Englerianae Denk & G.W.Grimm and Fagus. The subgenus Englerianae is found only in East Asia, distinctive for its low branches, often made up of several major trunks with yellowish bark. The better known species of subgenus Fagus are native to Europe, western and eastern Asia and eastern North America.

The European beech Fagus sylvatica is the most commonly cultivated species, with several ornamental varieties, and forest trees yielding a timber used for furniture, flooring and construction, plywood, and household items. The timber can be used to build homes. Beechwood makes excellent firewood. Slats of washed beech wood are spread around the bottom of fermentation tanks for some beers. Beech logs are burned to dry the malt used in some German smoked beers. Beech is also used to smoke Westphalian ham, andouille sausage, and some cheeses.

== Description ==
Beeches are monoecious, bearing both male and female flowers on the same plant. The small flowers are unisexual, the female flowers borne in pairs, the male flowers wind-pollinating catkins. The fruit is a three-angled nut, with two in a spiny dehiscent cupule. The bark is smooth. The leaves have a central vein with side-veins parallel to each other and ending in a tooth on the thin leaf-blade. The tree is deciduous, dropping its leaves in autumn.

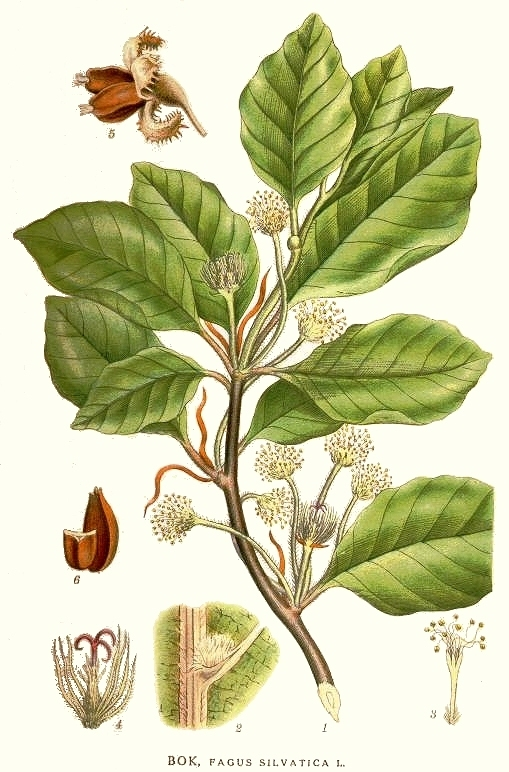
Botanical illustration

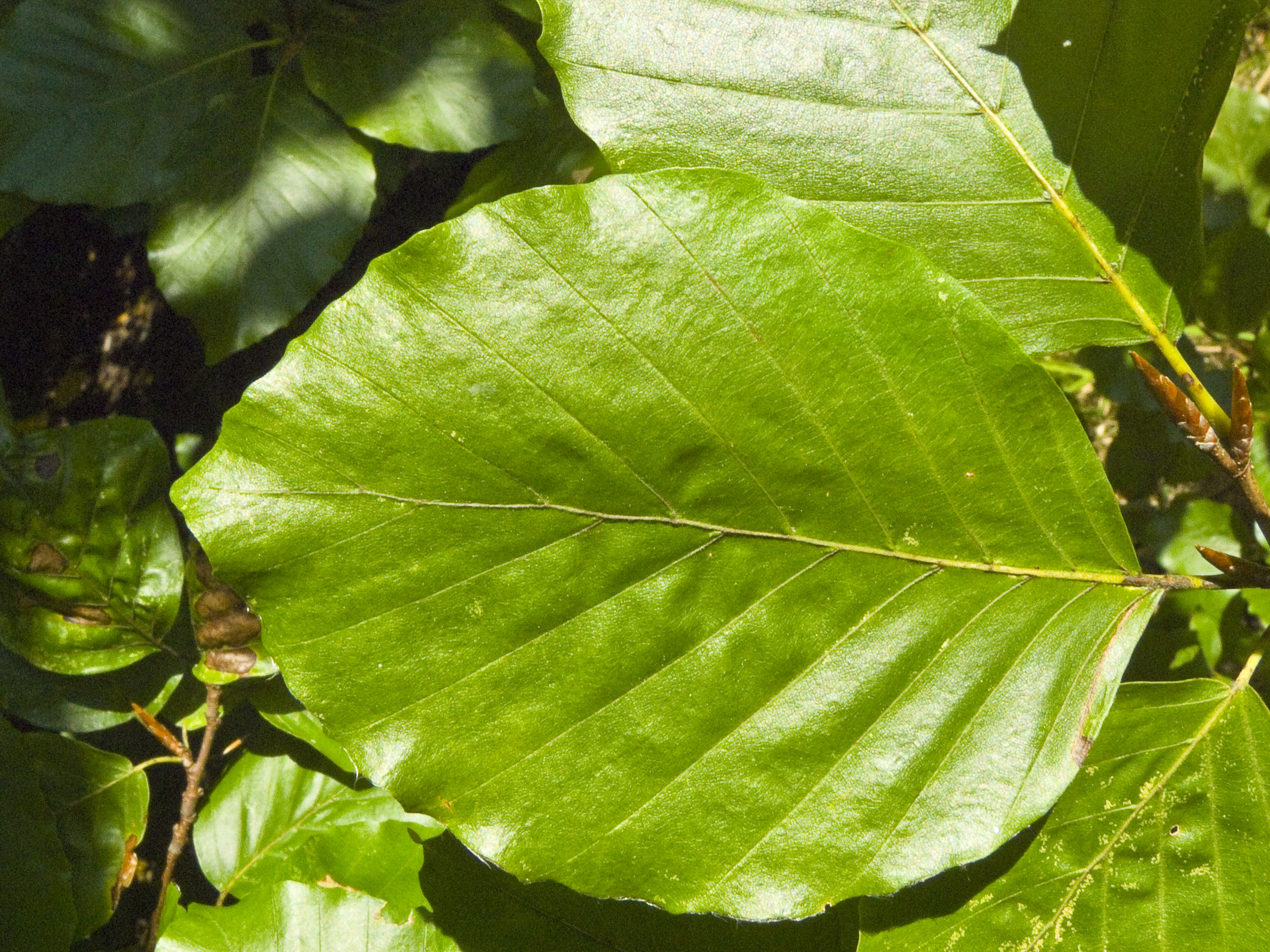
Leaf of Fagus sylvatica

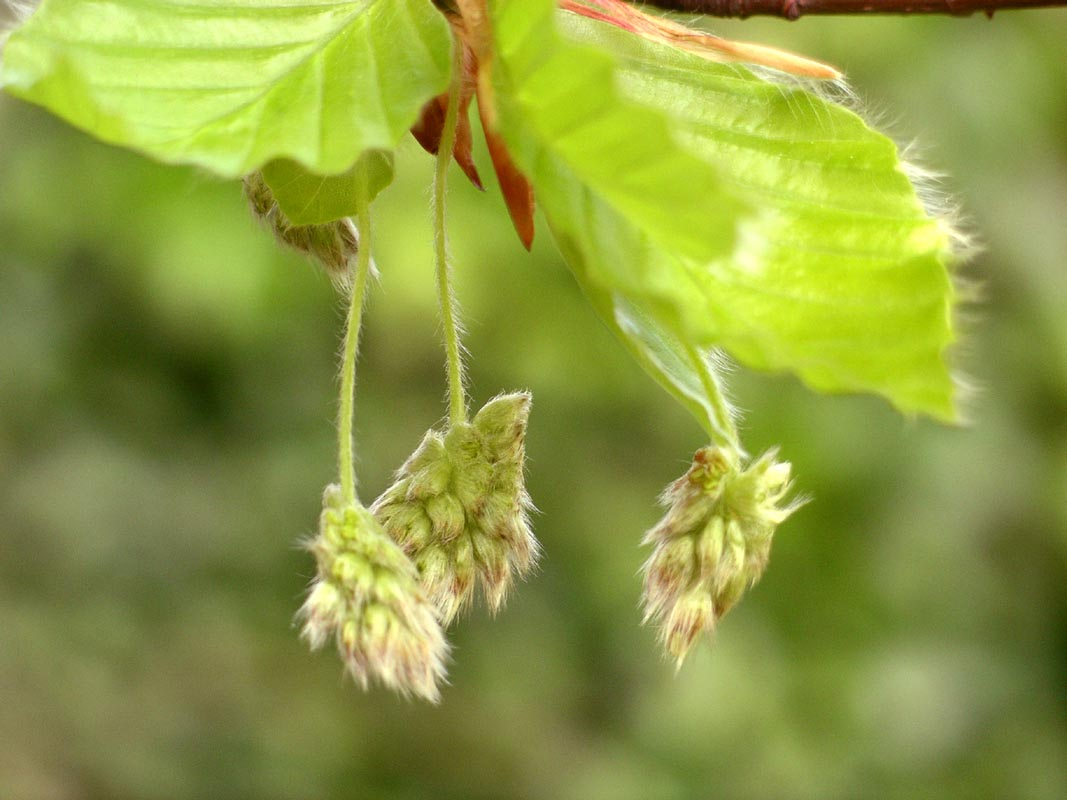
F. sylvatica flowers

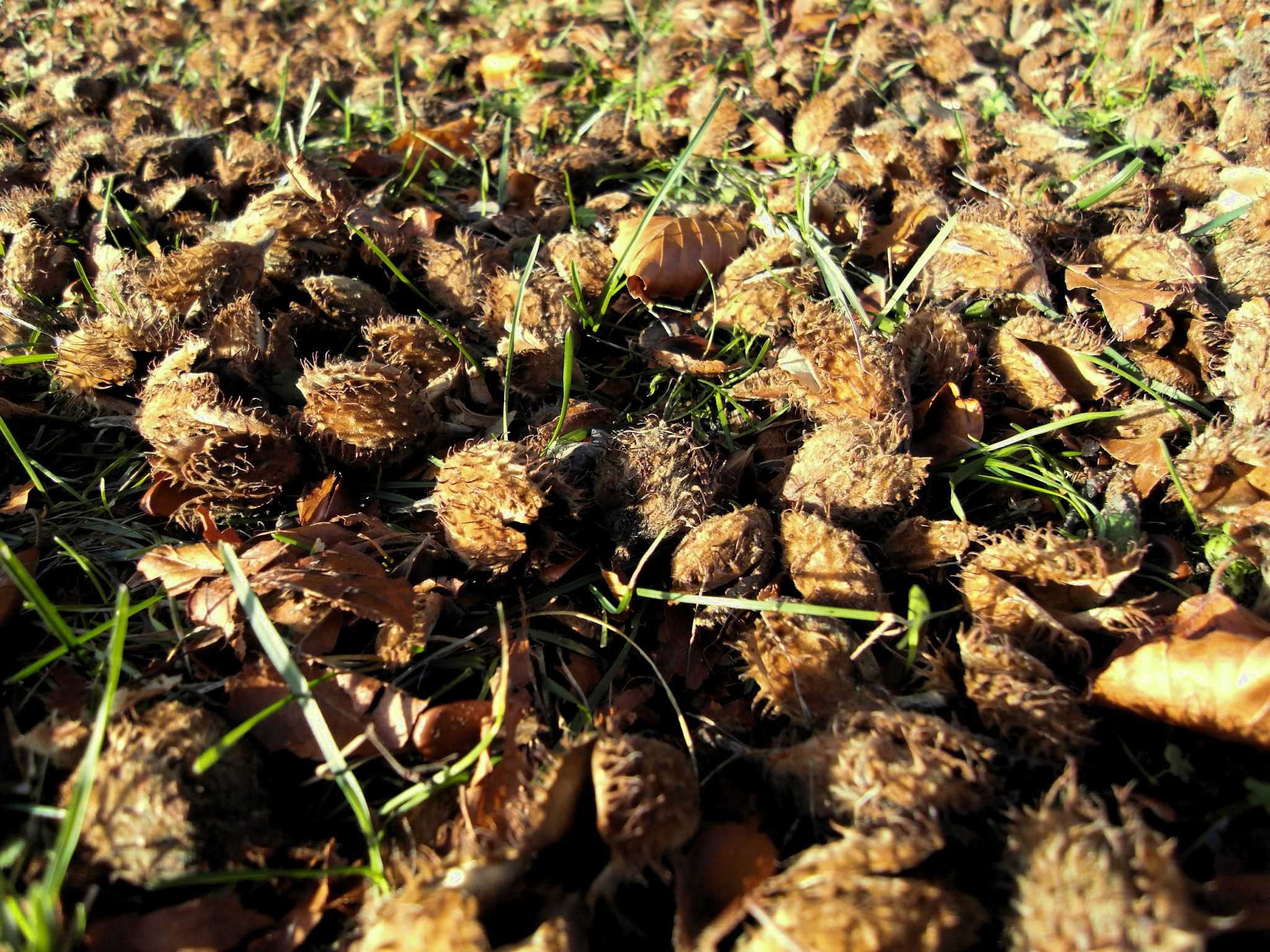
Beechnuts in autumn

== Evolution ==
=== Evolutionary history ===
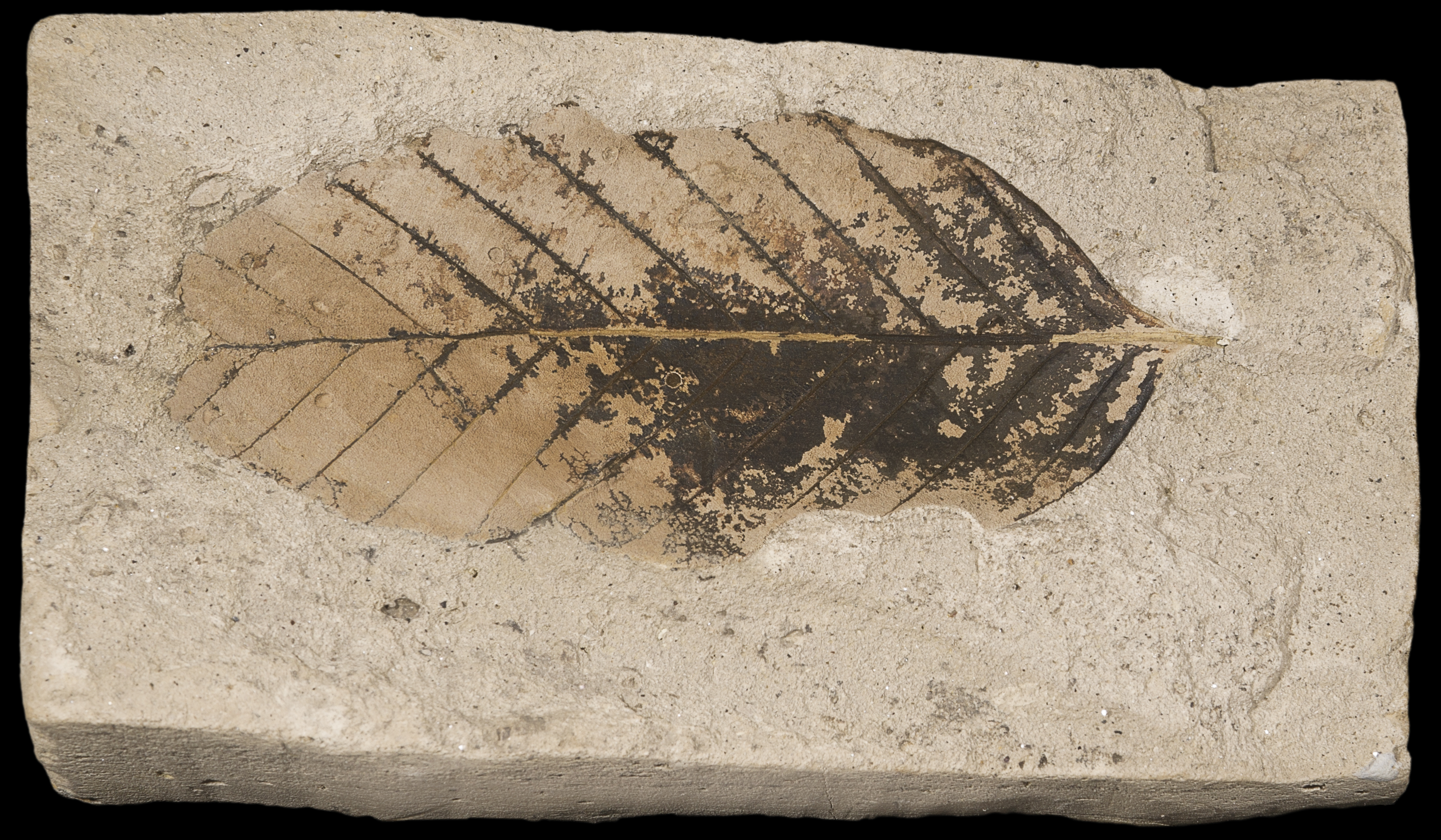
Fagus sylvatica pliocenica, Piacenzian, 3.6 to 2.6 mya

Numerous species have been named globally from the fossil record spanning from the Cretaceous to the Pleistocene. Some fossil species formerly placed in Fagus have been moved to other genera, namely Alnus, Castanea, Fagopsis, Fagoxylon, Fagus-pollenites, Juglans, Nothofagaphyllites, Nothofagus, and Trigonobalanus.

Fagus is the first diverging lineage in the evolution of the Fagaceae family, which includes oaks and chestnuts. The oldest fossils that can be assigned to the beech lineage are 81–82 million years old pollen from the Late Cretaceous of Wyoming, United States.

The first representatives of the modern-day genus were likely already present in the Paleocene of Arctic North America (western Greenland) and quickly radiated across the high latitudes of the Northern Hemisphere, with a first diversity peak in the Miocene of northeastern Asia. The contemporary species are the product of past, repeated reticulate evolutionary processes (outbreeding, introgression, hybridization). As far as studied, heterozygosity and intragenomic variation are common in beech species, and their chloroplast genomes are nonspecific with the exception of the Western Eurasian and North American species.

=== Phylogeny ===
A cladogram of 11 extant beech species is shown below. The subgenera Engleriana and Fagus diverged from each other in the Early Oligocene era, 32.1 to 33.4 million years ago.

- Fagus
  - subg. Engleriana Japan, Korea
    - F. multinervis
    - - F. engleriana
      - F. japonica
  - subg. Fagus
    - sect. Grandifolia Eastern US
      - F. grandifolia
      - F. mexicana
    - - sect. Fagus Europe
        - F. orientalis
        - F. sylvatica
      - sect. Lucida Southeast Asia
        - F. hayatae
        - - F. crenata
          - - F. longipetiolata
            - F. lucida

=== Taxonomy ===
The most recent classification system of the genus recognizes 14 species in two distinct subgenera, subgenus Englerianae and Fagus. Beech species can be diagnosed by phenotypical and/or genotypical traits. Species of subgenus Engleriana are found only in East Asia, and are notably distinct from species of subgenus Fagus in that these beeches are low-branching trees, often made up of several major trunks with yellowish bark and a substantially different nucleome (nuclear DNA), especially in noncoding, highly variable gene regions such as the spacers of the nuclear-encoded ribosomal RNA genes (ribosomal DNA). Further differentiating characteristics include the whitish bloom on the underside of the leaves, the visible tertiary leaf veins, and a long, smooth cupule-peduncle. Originally proposed but not formalized by botanist Chung-Fu Shen in 1992, this group comprised two Japanese species, F. japonica and F. okamotoi, and one Chinese species, F. engleriana. While the status of F. okamotoi remains uncertain, the most recent systematic treatment based on morphological and genetic data confirmed a third species, F. multinervis, endemic to Ulleungdo, a South Korean island in the Sea of Japan. The beeches of Ulleungdo have been traditionally treated as a subspecies of F. engleriana, to which they are phenotypically identical, or as a variety of F. japonica. The differ from their siblings by their unique nuclear and plastid genotypes.

The better known subgenus Fagus beeches are high-branching with tall, stout trunks and smooth silver-grey bark. This group includes five extant species in continental and insular East Asia (F. crenata, F. longipetiolata, F. lucida, and the cryptic sister species F. hayatae and F. pashanica), two pseudo-cryptic species in eastern North America (F. grandifolia, F. mexicana), and a species complex of at least four species (F. caspica, F. hohenackeriana, F. orientalis, F. sylvatica) in Western Eurasia. Their genetics are highly complex and include both species-unique alleles as well as alleles and ribosomal DNA spacers that are shared between two or more species. The western Eurasian species are characterised by morphological and genetical gradients.

=== Species ===
Species treated in Denk et al. (2024) and listed in Plants of the World Online (POWO):

Image	Name	Subgenus	Status, systematic affinity	Distribution	Accepted in POWO, Sept. 2025
	Fagus caspica Denk & G.W.Grimm – Caspian beech	Fagus	New species described in 2024; first-diverging lineage within the Western Eurasian group	Talysch and Elburz Mountains, southeastern Azerbaijan and northern Iran	No mention
	Fagus chienii W.C.Cheng	Fagus	Possibly conspecific with F. lucida	Probably extinct, described from a single location in China (Sichuan). Individuals collected there were morphologically and genetically indistinguishable from F. pashanica.	Yes
	Fagus crenata Blume – Siebold's beech or Japanese beech	Fagus	Widespread species; complex history connecting it to both the Western Eurasian group and the other East Asian species of subgenus Fagus	Japan; in the mountains of Kyushu, Shikoku and Honshu, down to sea-level in southern Hokkaido.	Yes
	Fagus engleriana Seemen ex Diels – Chinese beech	Englerianae	Widespread species; continental sister species of F. japonica	China; south of the Yellow River	Yes
	Fagus grandifolia Ehrh. – American beech	Fagus	Widespread species; sister species of F. mexicana	Eastern North America; from E. Texas and N. Florida, United States, to the St. Lawrence River, Canada at low to mid altitudes	Yes
	Fagus hayatae Palib. ex Hayata	Fagus	Narrow endemic species; forming a cryptic sister species pair with F. pashanica	Taiwan; restricted to the mountains of northern Taiwan	Yes
	Fagus hohenackeriana Palib. – Caucasian or Hohenacker's beech	Fagus	Dominant tree species of the Pontic and Caucasus Mountains; intermediate between F. caspica and F. orientalis. Its genetic heterogeneity may be indicative for ongoing speciation processes.	Northeastern Anatolia (Pontic Mountains, Kaçkar Mountains) and Caucasus region (Lesser and Greater Caucasus, Georgia, Armenia, Ciscaucasia; down to sea-level in southwestern Georgia)	Yes
	Fagus japonica Maxim.File:Fagus mexicana, Zacualtipán de Ángeles, Hidalgo, Mexico 5737290.jpg	Englerianae	Widespread species; insular sister species of F. engleriana	Japan; Kyushu, Shikoku and Honshu from sea-level up to c. 1,500 m (4,900 ft) a.s.l.	Yes
	Fagus longipetiolata Seemen	Fagus	Sym- to parapatric with F. lucida and F. pashanica, and sharing alleles with both species in addition to alleles indicating a sister relationship with the Japanese F. crenata.	China, south of the Yellow River, into N. Vietnam; in montane areas up to 2,400 m (7,900 ft) a.s.l.	Replaced by F. sinensis
	Fagus lucida Rehder & E.H.Wilson	Fagus	Rare species; closest relatives are F. crenata and F. longipetiolata	China; south of the Yellow River in montane areas between 800 and 2,000 m (2,600 and 6,600 ft) a.s.l.	Yes
	Fagus mexicana Martínez	Fagus	Narrow endemic sister species of F. grandifolia. F. mexicana differs from F. grandifolia by its slender leaves and less-evolved but more polymorphic set of alleles (higher level of heterozygosity)	Hidalgo, Mexico; at 1,400–2,000 m (4,600–6,600 ft) a.s.l. as an element of the subtropical montane mesophilic forest (bosque mesófilo de montaña) superimposing the tropical lowland rainforests.	Yes
	Fagus multinervis Nakai	Englerianae	Narrow endemic species, first diverging lineage within subgenus Englerianae	South Korea (Ulleungdo)	Yes
	Fagus orientalis Lipsky – Oriental beech (in a narrow sense)	Fagus	Sister species of F. sylvatica	Southeastern Europe (SE Bulgaria, NE Greece, East Thrace (European Turkey) and adjacent northwestern Asia (NW and N Anatolia)	Yes
	Fagus pashanica C.C.Yang	Fagus	Continental sister species of F. hayatae, with a set of alleles that puts it closer to F. longipetiolata and F. crenata than its insular sister.	China (Hubei, Hunan, Shaanxi, Sichuan, Zhejiang), at 1,300–2,300 m (4,300–7,500 ft) a.s.l. (eFlora of China, as F. hayatae)	Yes
	Fagus sinensis Oliv.	Fagus	Invalid; the original material included material from two much different species: F. engleriana and F. longipetiolata	China (Hubei), Vietnam	Yes, erroneously used as older synonym of F. longipetiolata
	Fagus sylvatica L. – European beech	Fagus	Sister species of and closely related to F. orientalis	Europe	Yes

=== Natural and potential hybrids ===
Name	Parentage	Status	Distribution
Fagus (×) moesiaca (K. Malý) Czeczott	F. sylvatica × F. orientalis	No evidence so far for hybrid origin. All individuals addressed as F. moesiaca included in genetic studies fell within the variation of F. sylvatica. They may represent a lowland ecotype of F. sylvatica.	Southeastern Balkans
Fagus × taurica Popl. – Crimean beech	F. sylvatica × F. orientalis s.l.	Hybrid status not yet tested by genetic data; according to isoenzyme profiles a less-evolved, relict population of F. sylvatica or intermediate between F. sylvatica and the species complex historically addressed as Oriental beech (F. orientalis in a broad sense)	Crimean peninsula

=== Etymology ===
The name of the tree in Latin, fagus (whence the generic epithet), is cognate with English "beech" and of Indo-European origin. It played a role in early debates on the geographical origins of the Indo-European people, the beech argument. Greek φηγός (figós) is from the same root, but the word was transferred to the oak tree (e.g. Iliad 16.767) as a result of the absence of beech trees in southern Greece.

The common name of "beech" is from the Anglo-Saxon boc, bece or beoce, the German buche, the Swedish box - all meaning "book" as well as beech and derived from the Sanskrit boko or letter and bokos or writings. This connection to "beech" seems to have derived from the fact that the old Runic tablets were of beech wood.

== Ecology ==
=== Habitat and distribution ===
Beech requires a deep soil with good drainage and a neutral or slightly acidic soil, pH 6 to 7.5. It is vulnerable to drought as its root system is relatively shallow. It does not live in waterlogged areas, but it can grow in windy places, shade from other trees, and cold. In northern Europe it is a lowland species, while further south it is montane, growing at an altitude of up to 1,800 metres (5,900 ft).

The English Lowlands beech forests is an ecoregion of high-canopy forest dominated by European beech in southeastern England, surviving as remnants such as the 150 square miles (390 km^{2}) New Forest. The species arrived in Britain after the last glaciation, and may have been restricted to basic soils in the south of England. It could have been introduced by Neolithic tribes who planted the trees for their edible nuts. In southeast Wales, the Cwm Clydach National Nature Reserve holds beech woodlands on the western edge of their natural range in a steep limestone gorge. The primeval beech forests of the Carpathians have been dominated since the last ice age by the beech. In North America, beech can form Beech-maple forest, seen by some ecologists as a climax community, by partnering with the sugar maple.

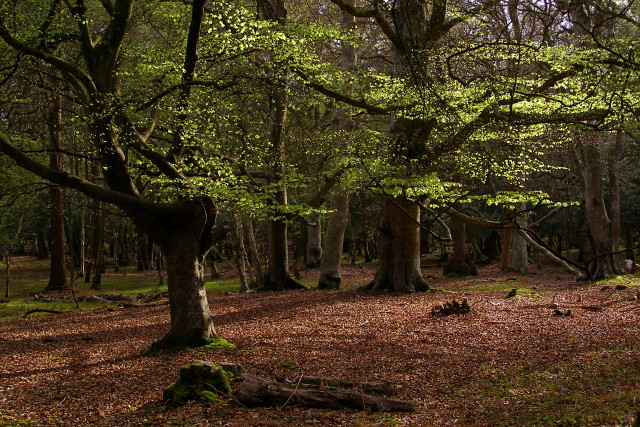
Lowland beech forest in the New Forest, England

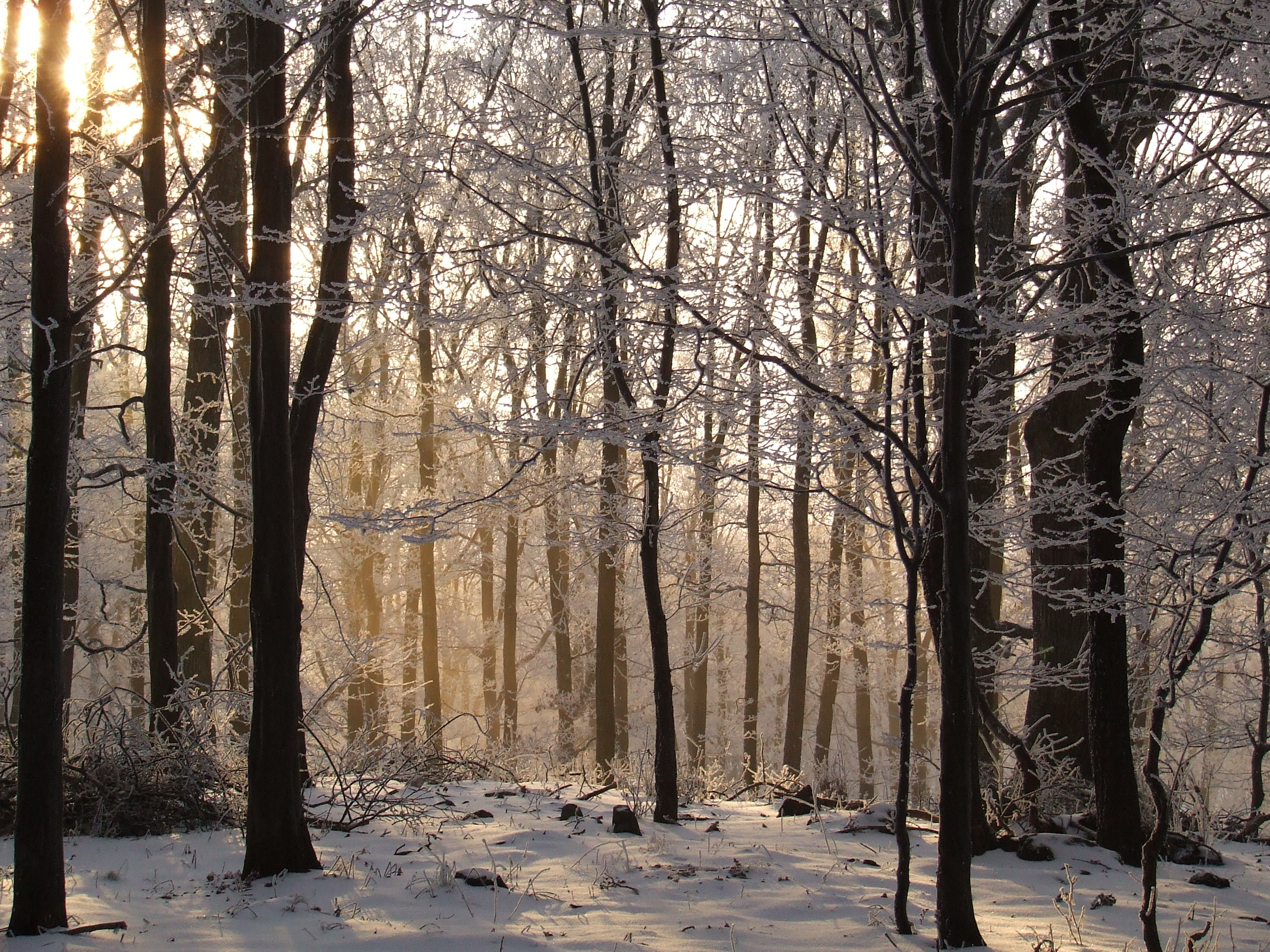
Montane beech forest in the Mátra mountains, Hungary

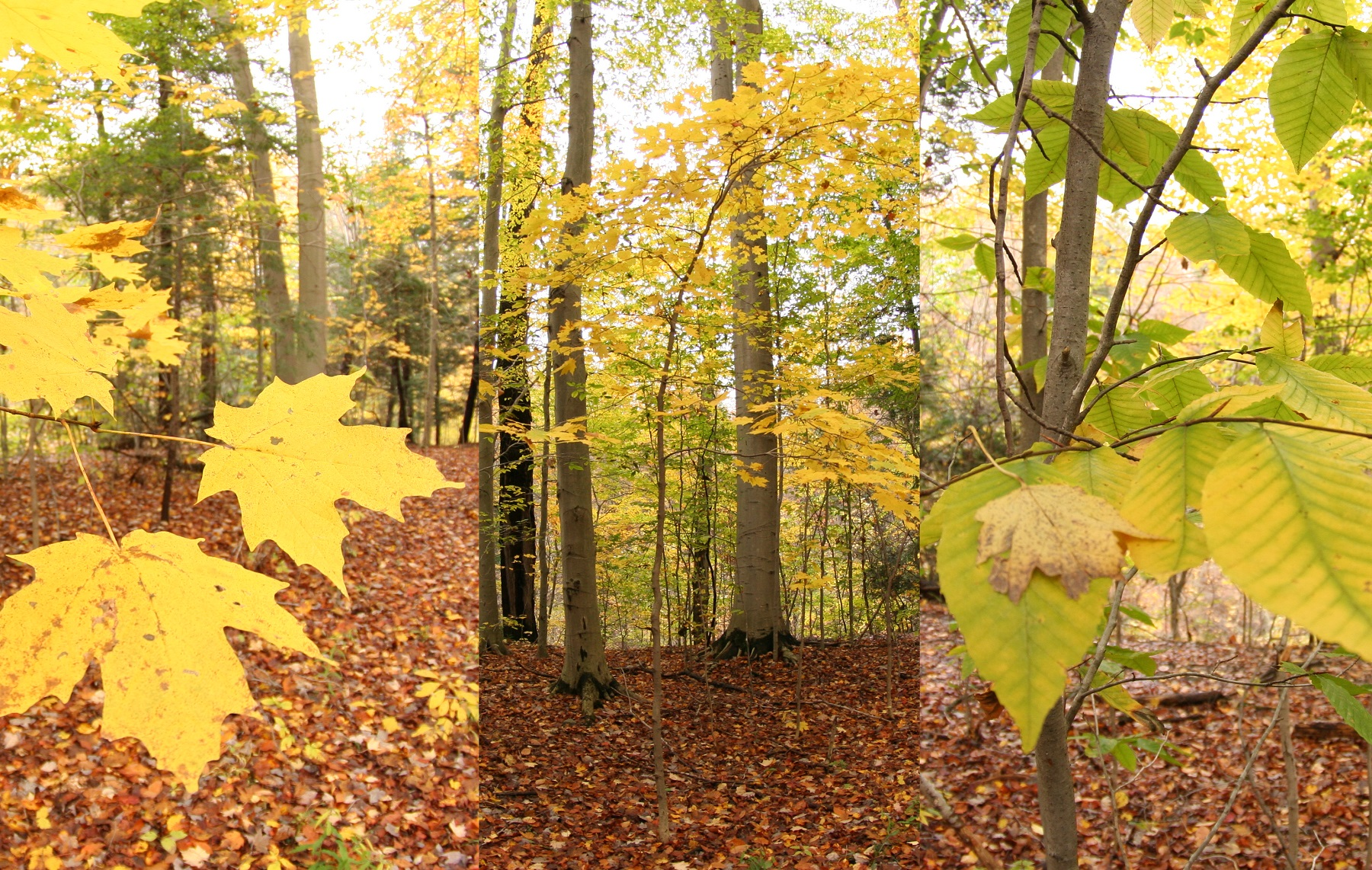
Beech–maple forest, Ohio, United States

=== Pests and diseases ===
The beech blight aphid, Grylloprociphilus imbricator, is a common pest of American beech trees.

Beech bark disease is a fungal infection of trees in the Eastern US, Canada, and Europe. Following damage caused by the scale insects Xylococculus betulae and Cryptococcus fagisuga, the fungi Neonectria faginata and Neonectria ditissima produce cankers each year; these may eventually girdle and kill the tree.

Beech leaf disease is a disease that affects beeches spread by the nematode Litylenchus crenatae mccannii. The disease was discovered in Ohio in 2012. It has spread through the Eastern United States and Canada.

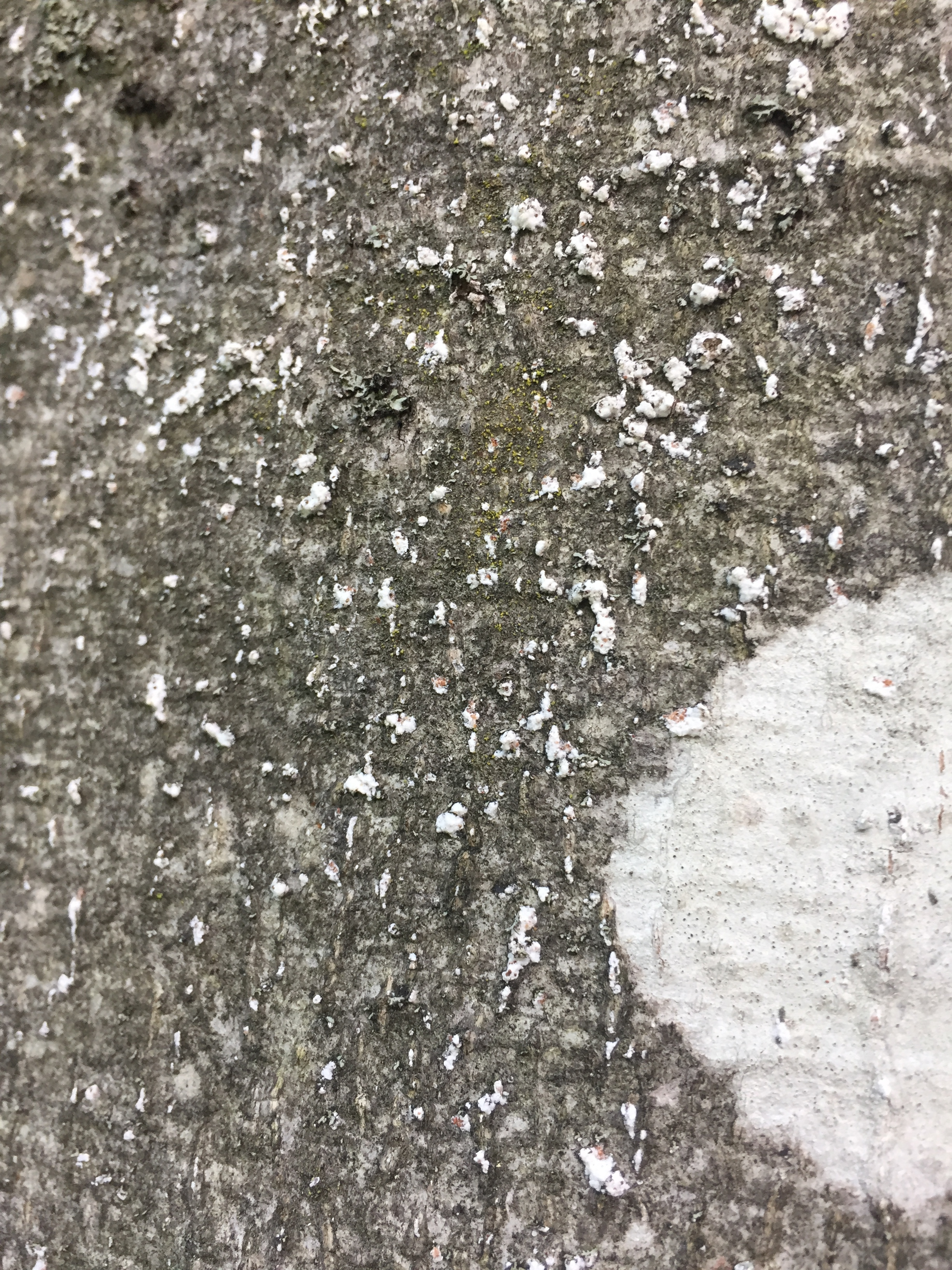
Beech bark disease indicated by white wax marks caused by scale insects

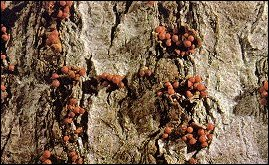
Fruiting bodies of Neonectria faginata, agent of beech bark disease

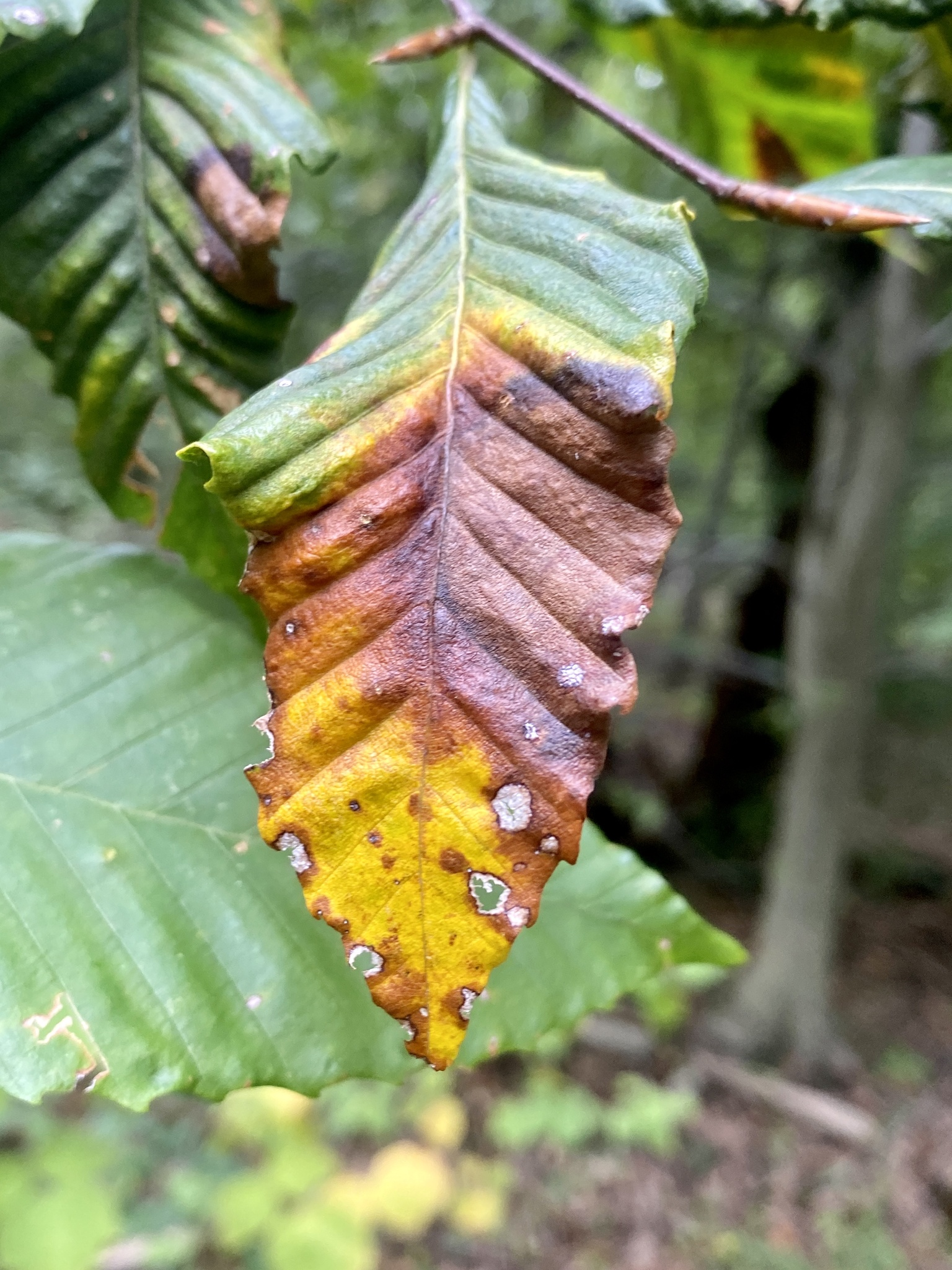
Beech leaf disease, leaf infected by Litylenchus crenatae mccannii

== Uses ==
=== Furniture and construction ===
The European beech Fagus sylvatica yields a tough timber. It weighs about 720 kg per cubic metre and is widely used for furniture construction, flooring, plywood, and household items. The timber can be used to build chalets, houses, and log cabins.

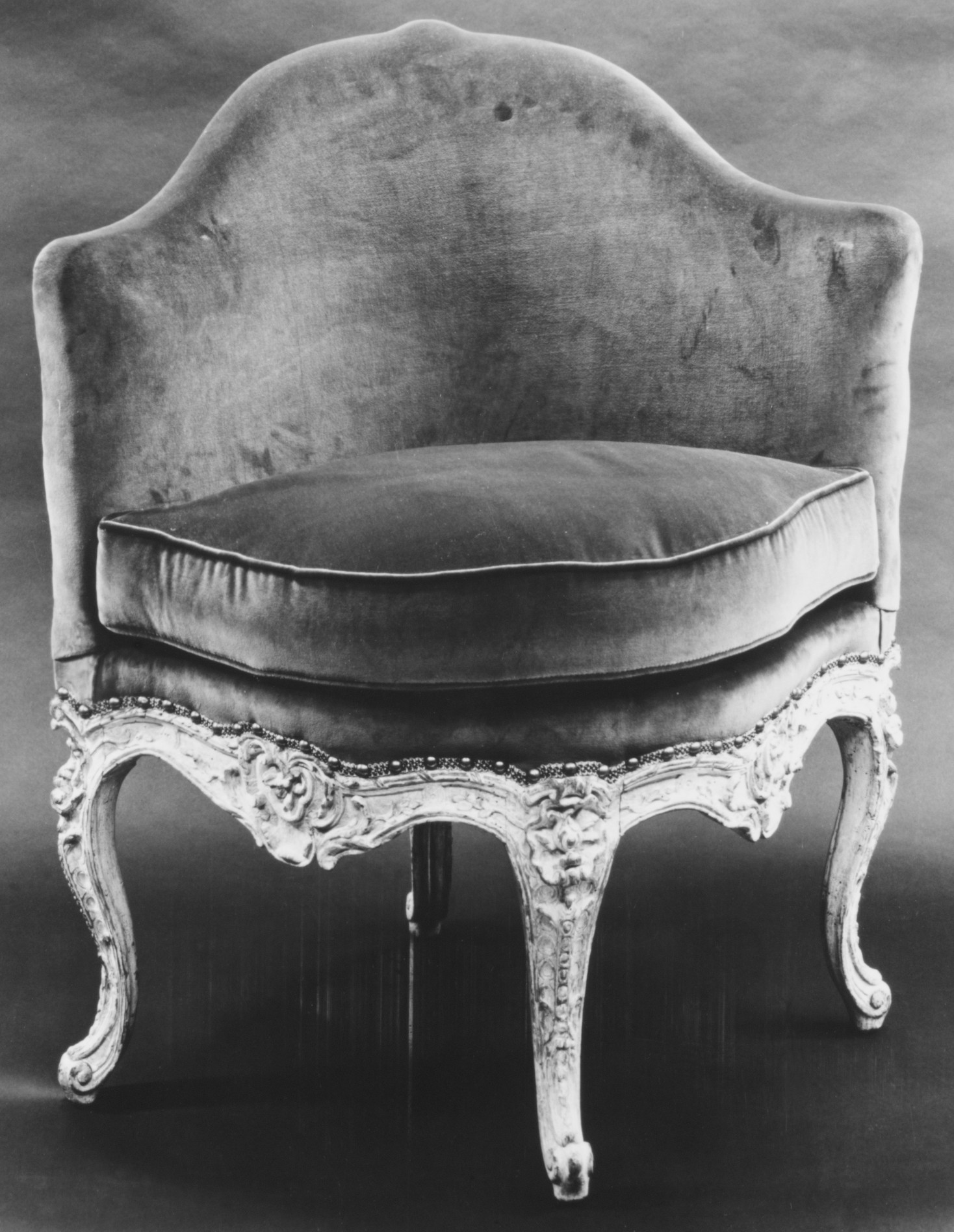
French desk chair, beechwood with leather upholstery, c. 1740 – c. 1750

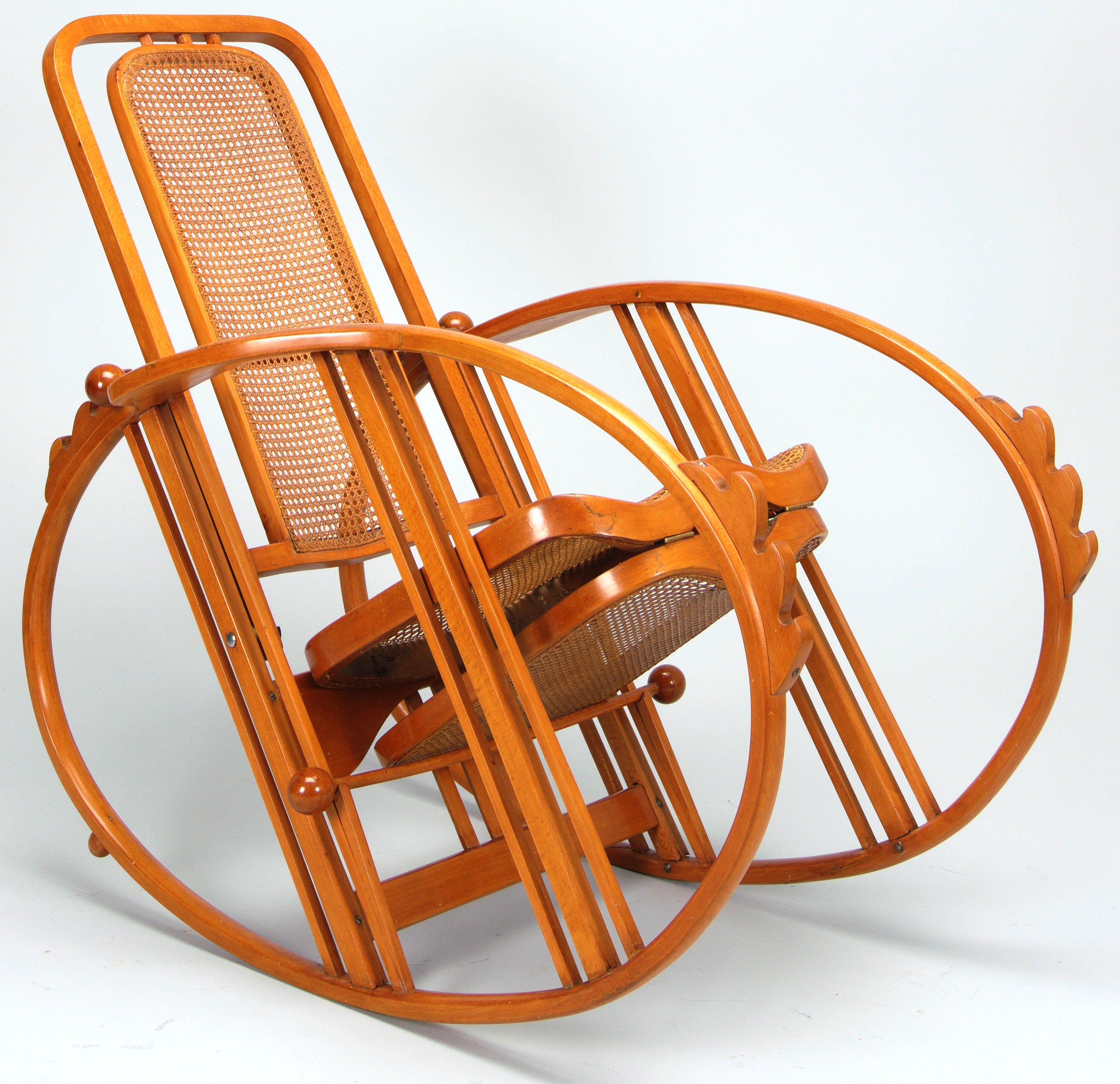
Italian bent beechwood rocking chair, Antonio Volpe S.A., c. 1905

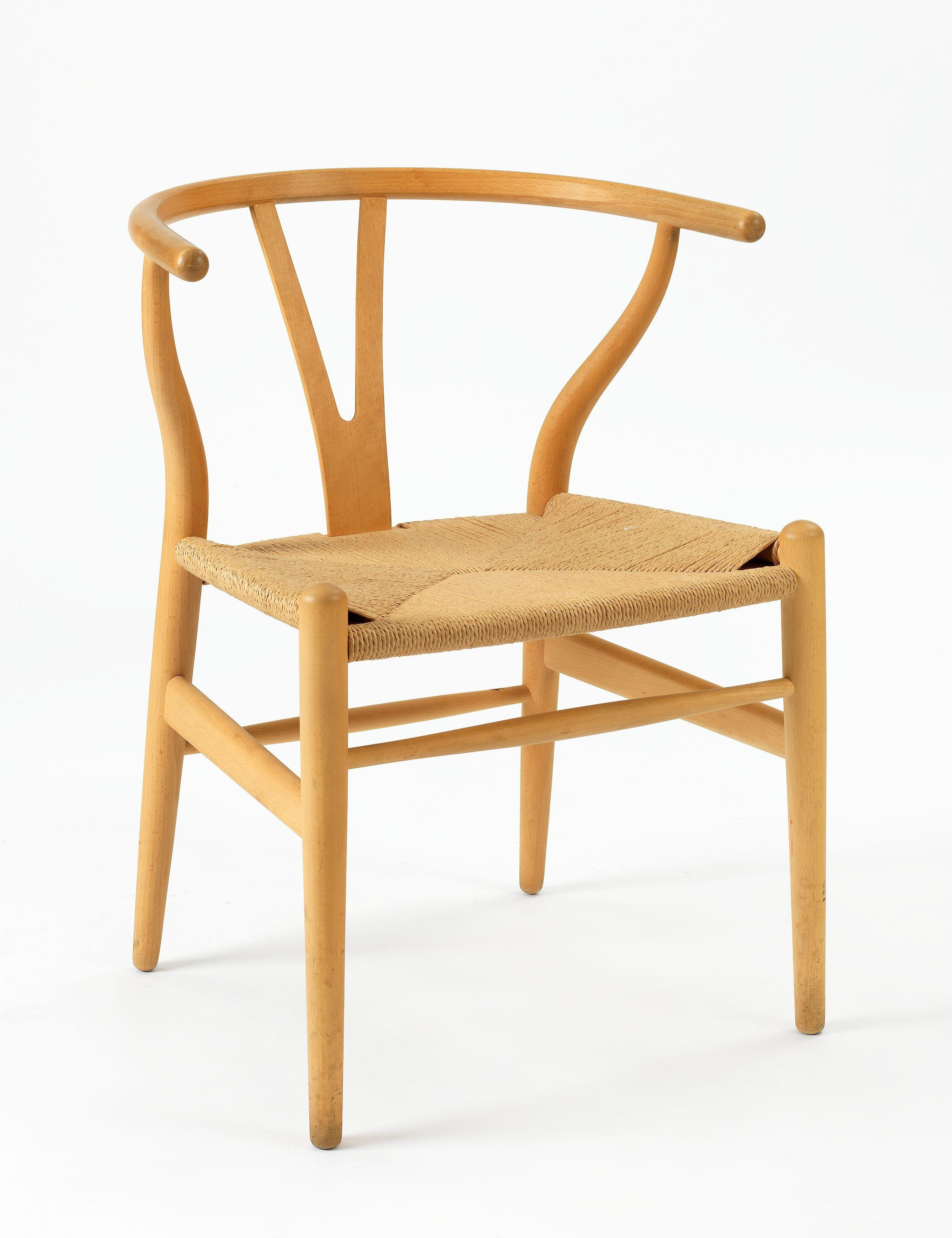
Hans J Wegner Wishbone Chair of turned and waxed beech, Denmark, 1949

=== Ornamental tree ===
The European beech, Fagus sylvatica, is widely cultivated in most regions that have a suitable climate, including North and South America, Europe, South Africa, Australia, and New Zealand. Many varieties are in cultivation, including the weeping beech F. sylvatica 'Pendula', several varieties of copper or purple beech, the fern-leaved beech F. sylvatica 'Asplenifolia', and the tricolour beech F. sylvatica 'Roseomarginata'. The columnar Dawyck beech (F. sylvatica 'Dawyck') is named after Dawyck Botanic Garden in the Scottish Borders.

The tallest beech hedge in the world, and the longest hedge in Britain, is the Meikleour Beech Hedge in Perth and Kinross, Scotland.

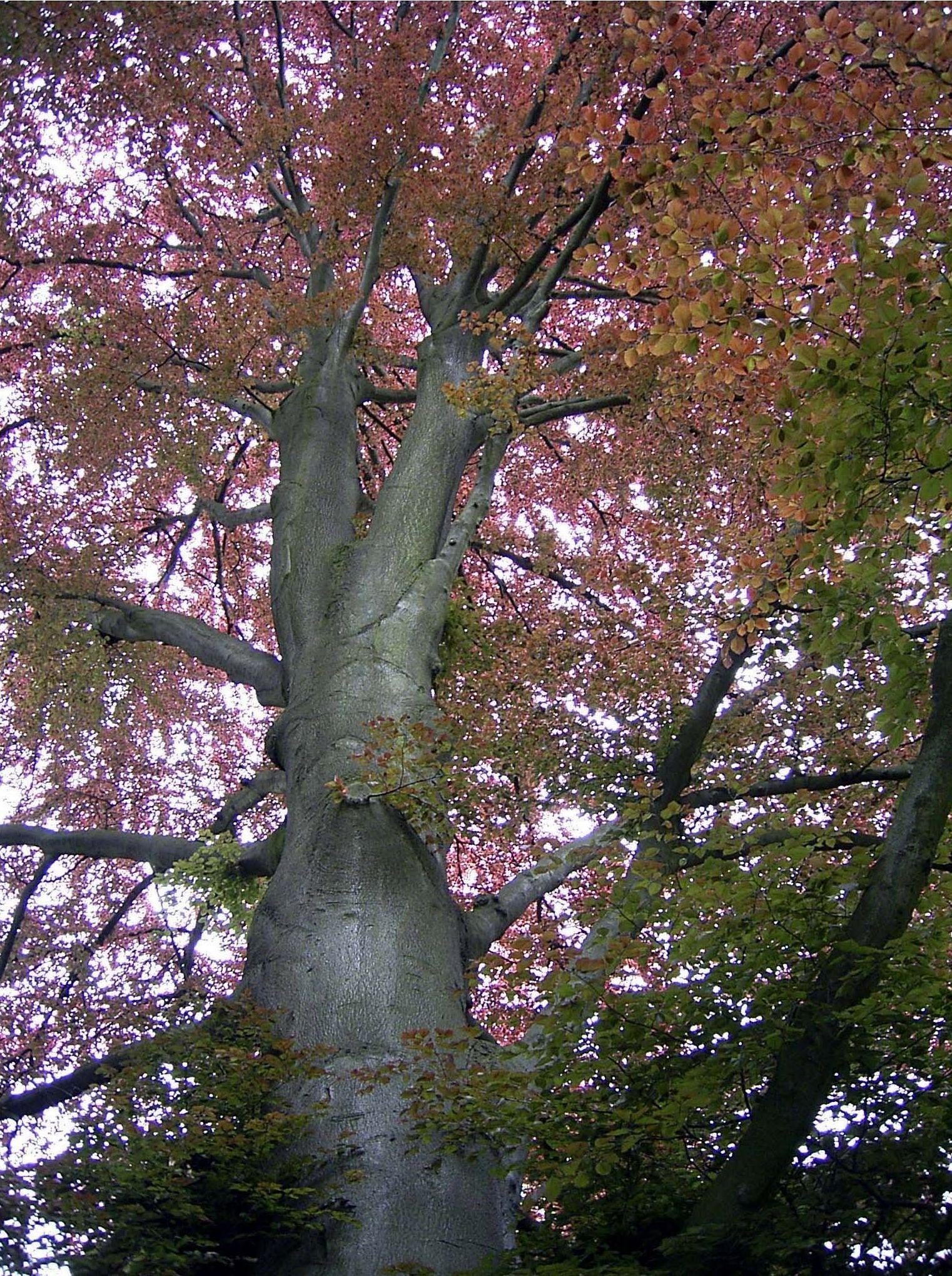
F. sylvatica var Purpurea

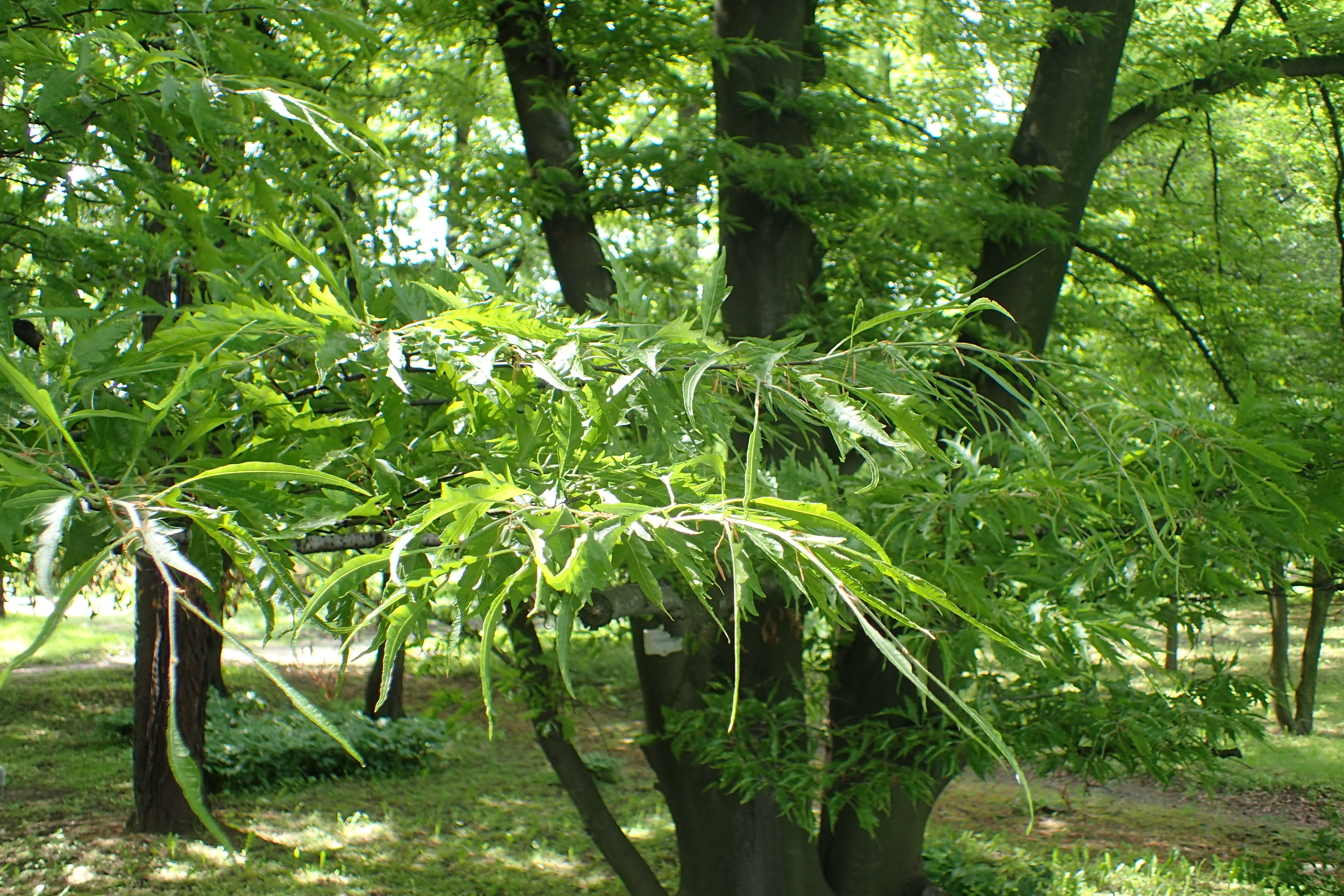
F. sylvatica var Asplenifolia

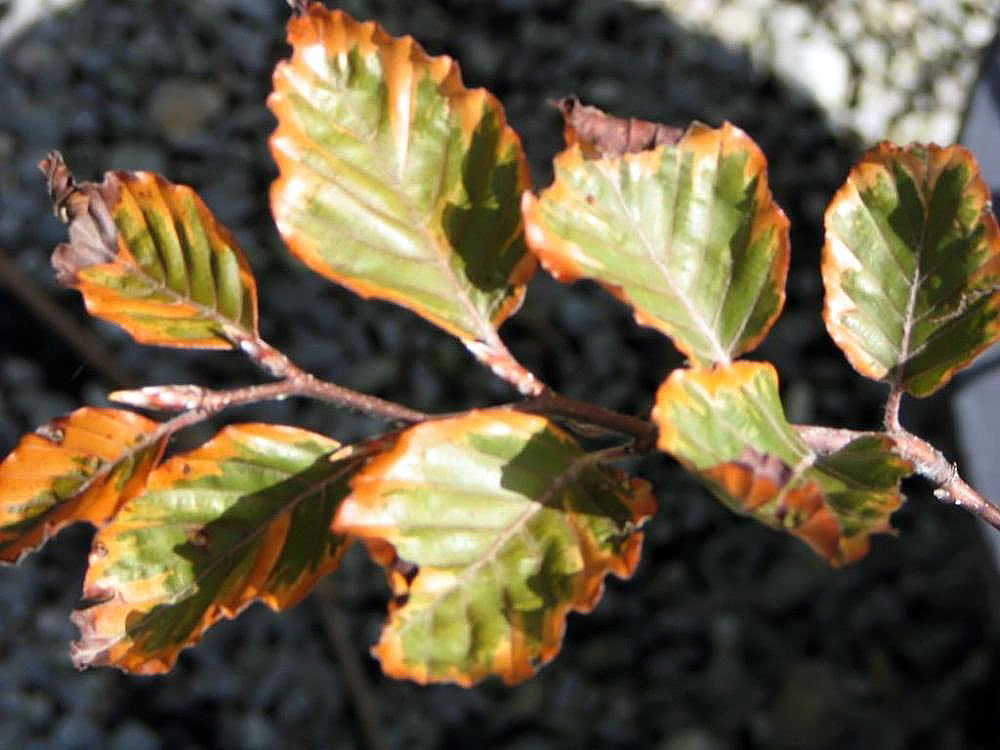
F. sylvatica var Roseomarginata

=== Food and food preparation ===
The fruit of the beech tree is an edible nut, known as beech mast. According to the Roman statesman Pliny the Elder in his Natural History, the fruit: "of the beech is the sweetest of all; so much so, that, according to Cornelius Alexander, the people of the city of Chios, when besieged, supported themselves wholly on mast". They can also be roasted and pulverized into a coffee substitute.

Spirals of beech wood, its flavour removed with baking soda, are spread inside fermentation tanks for beers such as Budweiser to increase the surface area of the yeast and prevent off-flavours. Beech logs are burned to dry the malt used in German smoked beers. Beech is also used to smoke Westphalian ham, traditional andouille (an offal sausage) from Normandy, and some smoked cheeses.

=== Other ===
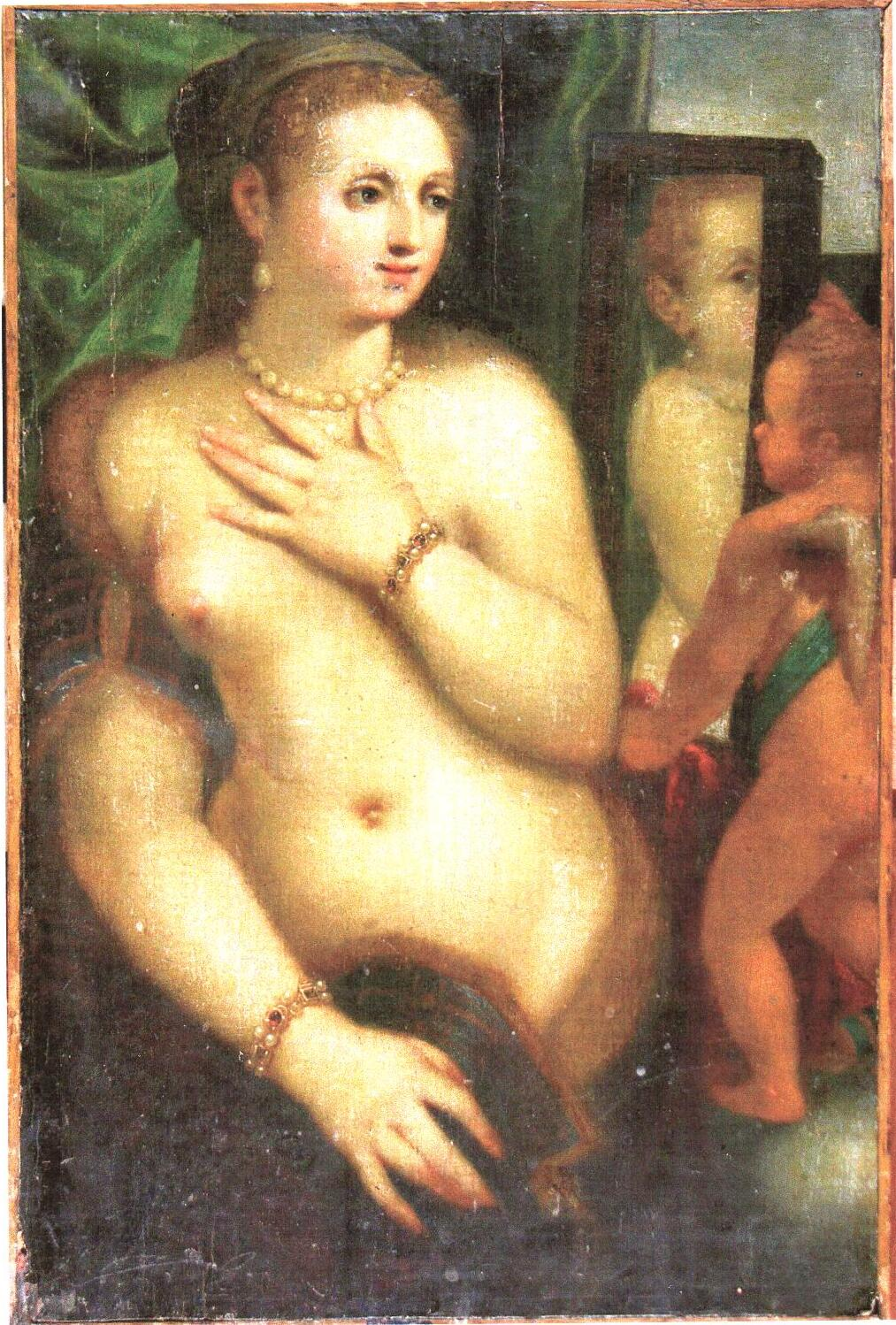
Painting Venus with a Mirror. Oil and plaster on beech wood. Titian, 1511

In antiquity, Indo-European people used beech bark as a writing material, especially in a religious context. Beech wood tablets were a common writing material in Germanic societies before the development of paper. The Old English bōc has the primary sense of "beech" with a secondary sense of "book".

The pigment bistre was made from beech wood soot. Beech litter raking was used as a replacement for straw in animal husbandry in Switzerland in the 17th century. Beech is one of the 38 plants whose flowers are used to prepare Bach flower remedies. Beech makes an excellent firewood. Some drum shells are made from beech. The textile modal is a kind of rayon often made wholly from cellulose extracted from pulped beech wood.

In Gallo-Roman religion, Fagus (Latin for "beech") was a god known from four inscriptions found in the Hautes-Pyrénées.

== See also ==
- Ancient and Primeval Beech Forests of the Carpathians and Other Regions of Europe
- English Lowlands beech forests
- Weeping Beech (Queens)
