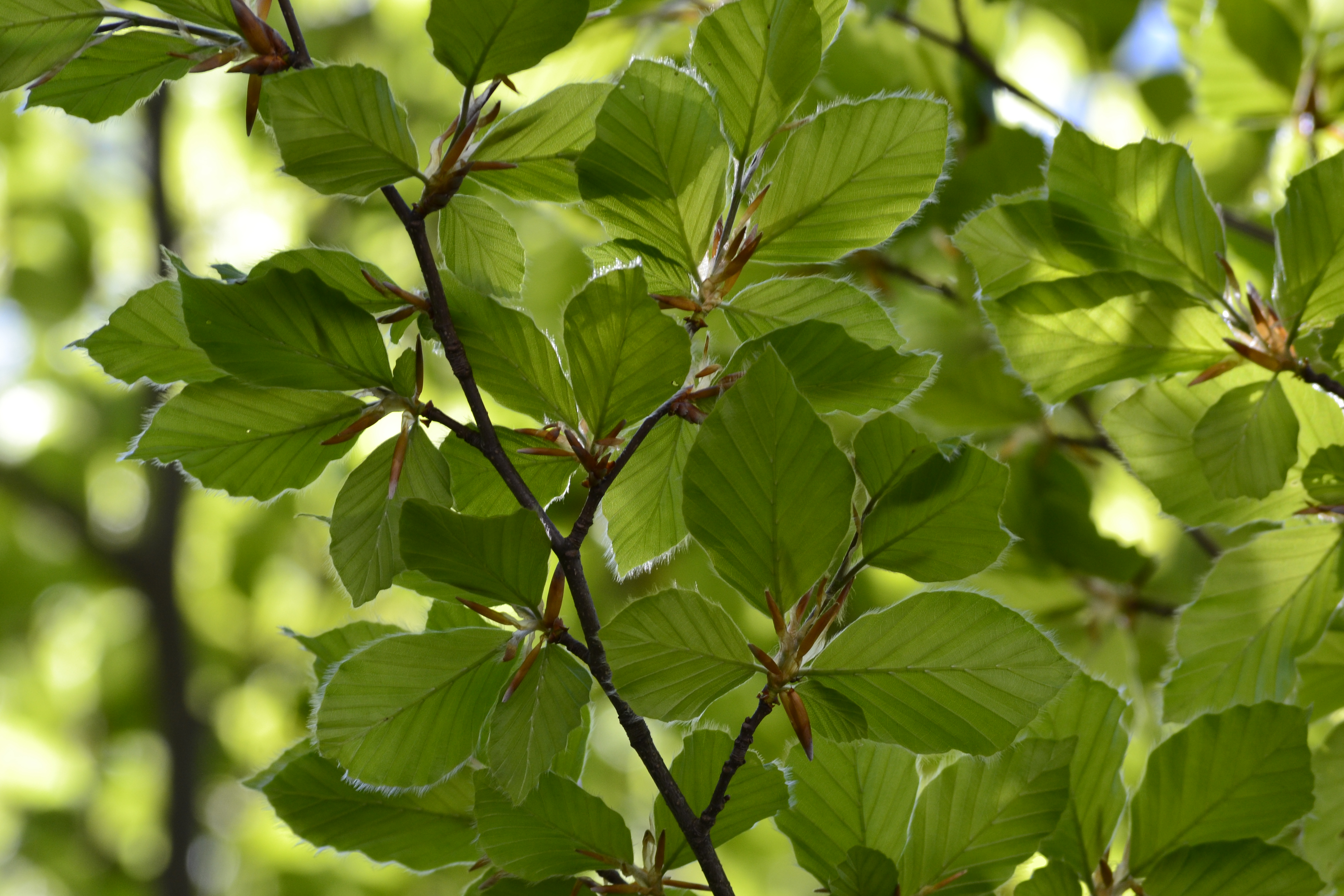

Scientific classification
- Kingdom: Plantae
- Clade: Tracheophytes
- Clade: Angiosperms
- Clade: Eudicots
- Clade: Rosids
- Order: Fagales
- Family: Fagaceae
- Genus: Fagus
- Species: F. × taurica

Binomial name
- Fagus × taurica Popl.

Synonyms
- F. moesiaca; F. × moesiaca (K.Malý) Czeczott; F. sylvatica subsp. moesiaca (K.Malý) Szafer; F. sylvatica f. moesiaca K.Malý; F. sylvatica var. moesiaca K. Malý

= Fagus × taurica =

Hybrid species of beech

Fagus × taurica, the Crimean beech, is a deciduous tree in the beech genus Fagus.

== Taxonomy ==
The Balkan beech or Moesian beech (Fagus moesiaca), is considered to be the same species. It has been thought to be a hybrid between F. orientalis and F. sylvatica, but the relationships between Eurasian beeches are still unclear, and it may show greater affinity with F. orientalis.
