= Fagus chienii =

Scientific classification
- Kingdom: Plantae
- Clade: Tracheophytes
- Clade: Angiosperms
- Clade: Eudicots
- Clade: Rosids
- Order: Fagales
- Family: Fagaceae
- Genus: Fagus
- Species: F. chienii

Binomial name
- Fagus chienii W.C.Cheng

Species of flowering plant

Fagus chienii is a species of beech tree native to northern Sichuan in China. It was first formally named by Chinese botanist Wan Chun Cheng in 1935.

Flora of China notes that the taxonomic status of Fagus chienii is uncertain, as it is only known from the place it was collected (type locality), and is similar to Fagus lucida. The two species are distinguished by the "longer, recurved cupule bracts" in F. chienii.
