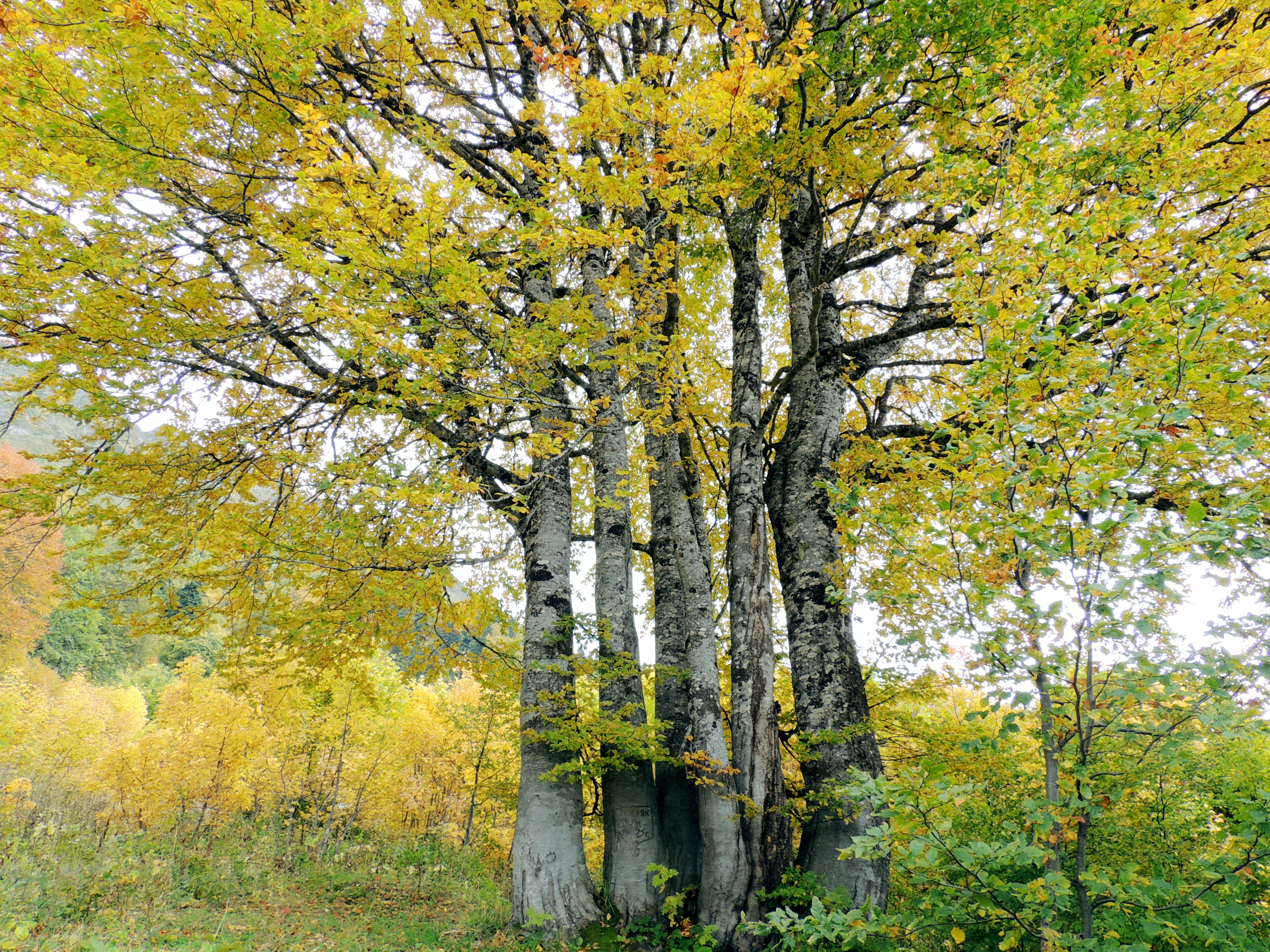
- Caucasian beech in Adlersky city district, Krasnodar Krai, Russia
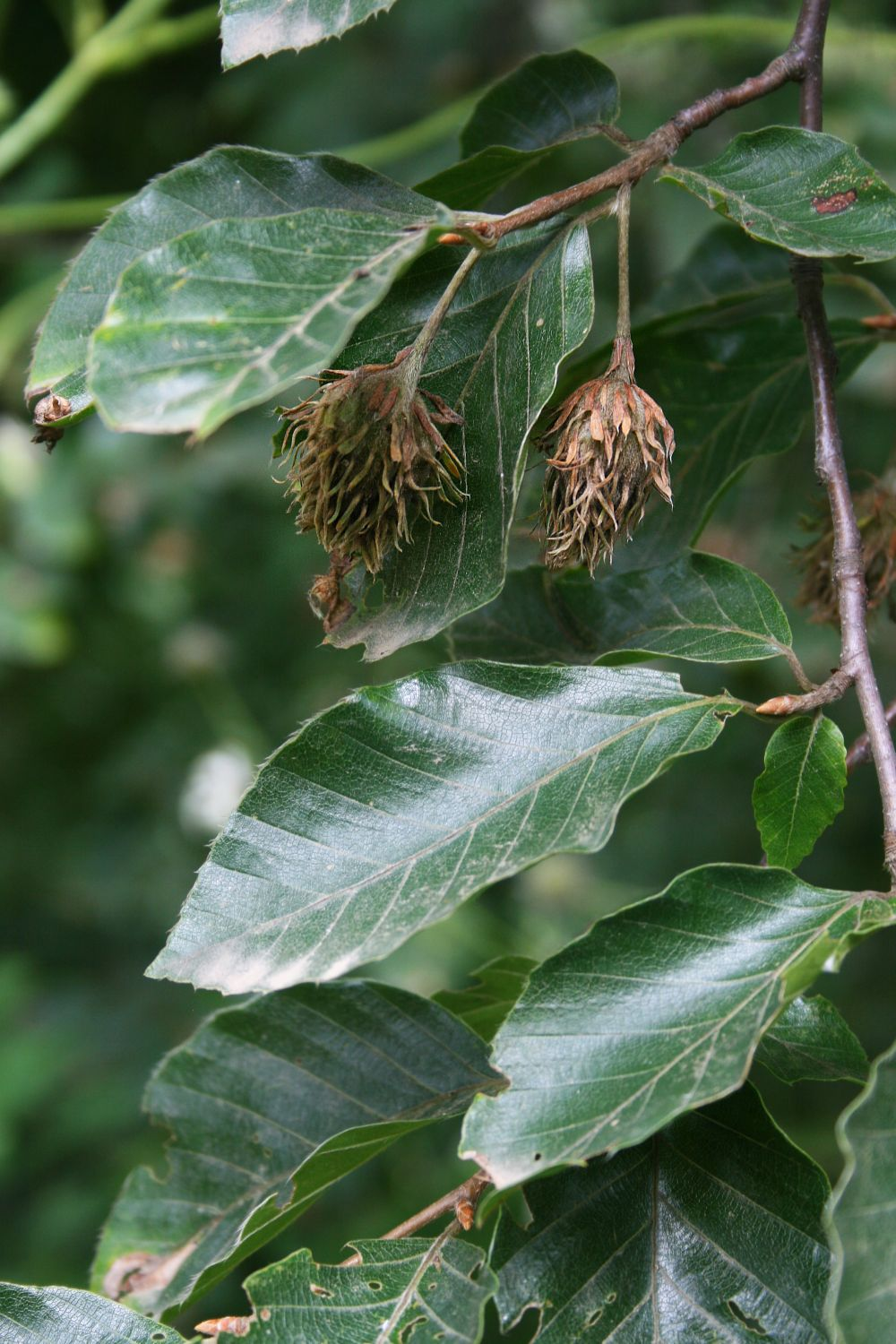
- foliage and fruit, Bakuriani, Georgia

Scientific classification
- Kingdom: Plantae
- Clade: Tracheophytes
- Clade: Angiosperms
- Clade: Eudicots
- Clade: Rosids
- Order: Fagales
- Family: Fagaceae
- Genus: Fagus
- Species: F. hohenackeriana

Binomial name
- Fagus hohenackeriana Palib.
- Distribution map

= Fagus hohenackeriana =

Species of beech

Fagus hohenackeriana, the Caucasian beech, is a deciduous tree in the family Fagaceae. It is native to the Caucasus region on the borders of the extreme southeast of Europe and western Asia, from northeastern Turkey east to Azerbaijan and north to southernmost European Russia. Although first noted as distinct and described in 1908 by the Russian botanist Ivan Palibin, it was until recently universally regarded as a synonym of Fagus orientalis (Oriental beech), until a major genetic study discovered it was distinct. Its treatment as a distinct species has been accepted by the Plants of the World Online database.

== Description ==
Fagus hohenackeriana is a large tree, capable of reaching heights of up to 46 metres (151 ft) tall, though more typically 25–35 m (80–110 ft) tall and up to 1.5 m (5 ft) trunk diameter. Like all beeches, it has smooth, grey bark.

The leaves are similar to those of alternate, simple, and entire or with a slightly crenate margin, 8–14 cm (3–6 in) long (rarely to 20 cm (8 in) long), with 7–12 veins on each side of the leaf (7–13 in F. orientalis; 6–7 veins in F. sylvatica).

The seeds are small triangular nuts 15–20 mm (0.6–0.8 in) long and 7–10 mm (0.3–0.4 in) wide at the base; there are two nuts in each cupule, maturing in the autumn 5–6 months after pollination. The cupule is similar to that of F. orientalis in differing from that of European beech (Fagus sylvatica) in having flattened, slightly leaf-like appendages at the base (which are slender, soft spines in European beech).

== Taxonomy ==
Fagus hohenackeriana is closely related to Fagus orientalis (Oriental beech) from further west in Turkey, and to Fagus caspica (Caspian beech) from the Alborz mountains to the east.

== Habitat ==
It occurs in moist mountain habitats, often mixed with Abies nordmanniana.

== See also ==
- Caucasus mixed forests ecoregion — key species in the ecoregion
