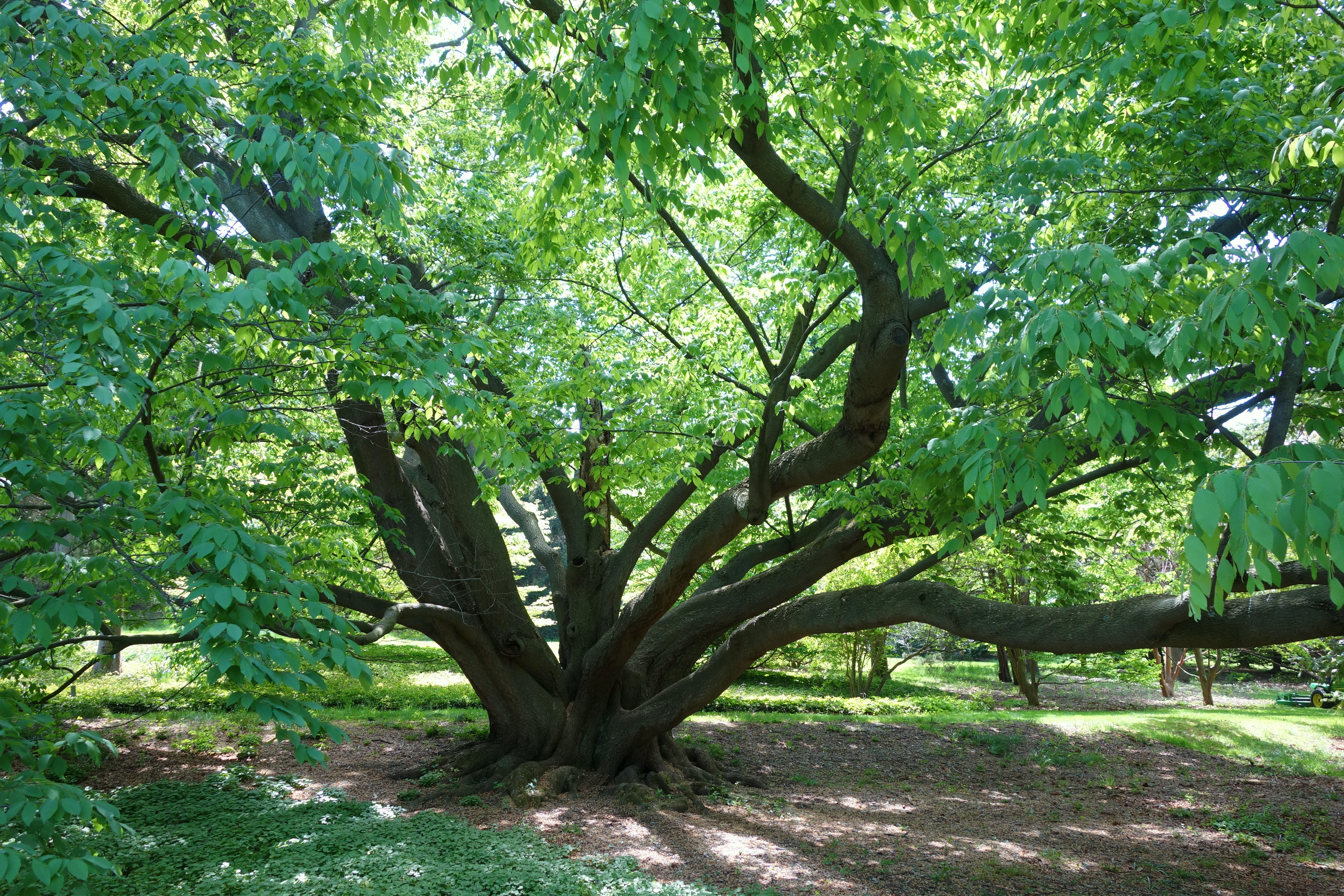

Conservation status
- Least Concern (IUCN 3.1)

Scientific classification
- Kingdom: Plantae
- Clade: Embryophytes
- Clade: Tracheophytes
- Clade: Spermatophytes
- Clade: Angiosperms
- Clade: Eudicots
- Clade: Rosids
- Order: Fagales
- Family: Fagaceae
- Genus: Fagus
- Species: F. engleriana

Binomial name
- Fagus engleriana Seemen ex Diels

= Fagus engleriana =

Engler's beech

Species of beech

Fagus engleriana, the Engler's beech, also known as Chinese beech, is a species of beech native to central and eastern China (Anhui, Guangxi, Guizhou, Henan, Hubei, Hunan, Shaanxi, Sichuan, Yunnan, and Zhejiang provinces) where it grows in broad-leaved and mixed forests. It can reach 25 m (82 ft) in height.

The shoots are dark brown and hairless. Leaves contain 10–14 vein-pairs and the margin is hairless, deckled and scarcely toothed.
