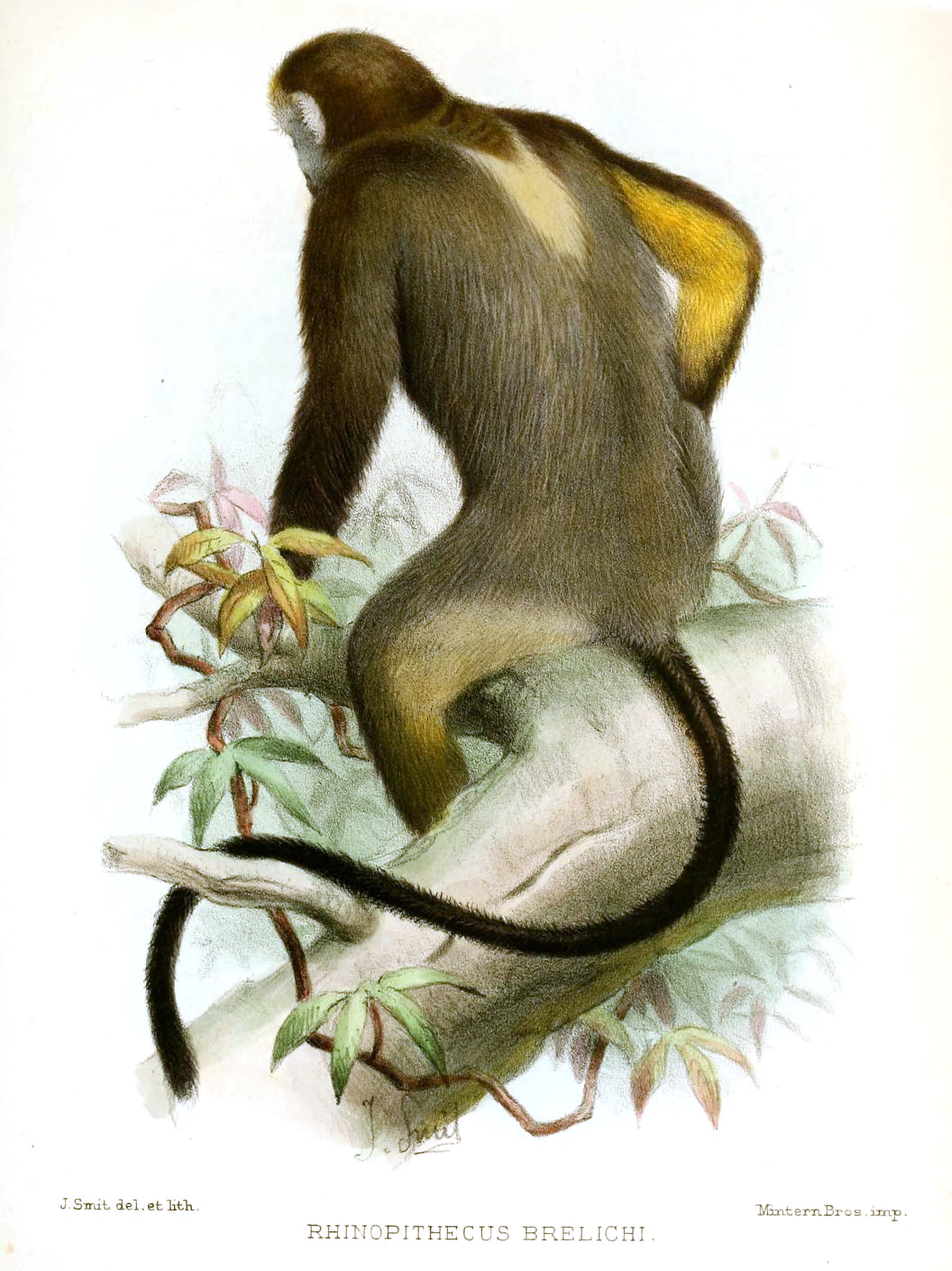

Conservation status
- Critically Endangered (IUCN 3.1)
- CITES Appendix I

Scientific classification
- Kingdom: Animalia
- Phylum: Chordata
- Class: Mammalia
- Order: Primates
- Family: Cercopithecidae
- Genus: Rhinopithecus
- Species: R. brelichi

Binomial name
- Rhinopithecus brelichi Thomas, 1903
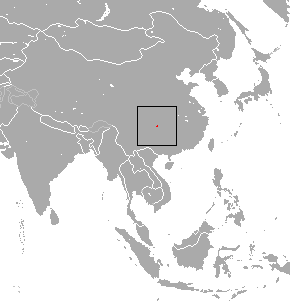
- Gray snub-nosed monkey range

Synonyms
- Pygathrix brelichi Thomas, 1903

= Gray snub-nosed monkey =

Species of Old World monkey

The gray snub-nosed monkey (Rhinopithecus brelichi), also known as Brelich's snub-nosed monkey, Guizhou snub-nosed monkey, and Guizhou golden monkey, is a species of primate in the family Cercopithecidae. It is endemic to China, where it is known as the Guizhou golden hair monkey (黔金丝猴) or gray golden hair monkey (灰金丝猴). It is threatened by habitat loss. Of the three species of snub-nosed monkeys in China, the gray snub-nosed monkey is the most threatened, with a total population thought to number fewer than 400 individuals.

== Description ==
Adults are covered with long, fine hair, generally grading from brown on its upper body to gray on its lower body, with a white patch between its shoulder blades. Its head, neck, and ends of its limbs are black, except for a golden brow. It has a golden chest, and chestnut fur on its inner knees and inner sides of its upper arms. Its face is bare bluish-white skin, pink around the eyes and mouth, and has a shelf-like brow and reduced nasal bones, giving it a snub-nosed appearance. Juveniles are shades of gray with patterns changing with age. Adult males are brighter colored than adult females, and have white skin on prominent nipples. Size data is limited, but two adult male specimens weighed 14.5 kg on average, and an adult female specimen weighed 8 kg, with adult length excluding tail ranging from 64–73 cm, and tail length ranging from 70–97 cm.

== Distribution ==
The confirmed distribution range of the gray snub-nosed monkey is limited to the Fanjingshan National Nature Reserve in the Wuling Mountains in Guizhou province, China. There is unpublished evidence that 20 individuals moved from the Nature Reserve to an adjacent community forest (Lijiadashan), and there are unconfirmed anecdotal reports of a population in Jinfoshan Nature Reserve.

== Habitat ==
Its habitat consists of mixed deciduous and evergreen broadleaf forests, including secondary forest, but not coniferous forest. The forests include mono-groves of Asian oak (Cyclobalanopsis spp.) and beech (Fagus longipetiolata), as well as mixed species forests that include cherry (Prunus spp.), maple (Acer spp.), Rhododendron spp, and birch (Betula spp.) trees. It lives at elevations of 1,400–2,300 m in summers down to 570 m at times of heavy snow cover. They are thought to utilize most of the available range of the nature reserve. The yearly rainfall in the area above 1,600 m elevation is above 2000 mm. Snow is common in the winter, with sub-freezing temperatures about five months of the year, though monthly mean temperatures are never below 0 °C.

== Behavior ==
The diurnal species is considered semi-terrestrial, primarily inhabits trees where available. Locomotion includes a mix of "quadrupedal walking, climbing, leaping, semi-brachiation (tree-swinging) and occasional full brachiation."

It feeds on a variety of young leaves, leaf and flower buds, bark, fruits, certain petioles (e.g. Fagus longipetiolata), seeds (e.g. Prunus spp. and Sorbus spp.), and insect larvae. Seasonality of the forest means the monkey's diet changes seasonally as well; it may be 7% leaves in the first three months of the year, and 93% in the next three. Fruits and seeds can constitute 35% of the diet in July to September.

Its social structure is based on small groups that band together into larger troops of up to 400 or more individuals, traveling, feeding and sleeping. The groups typically have 5–10 members, comprising one dominant male and several females and their young. There are also all-male bachelor groups of two to five adult or sub-adult males, which typically mill about the periphery of a troop. The groups split into large or smaller bands seasonally.

== Conservation status ==
Though legally protected, the gray snub-nosed monkey is threatened seriously due to habitat loss from forest clearing, illegal mining, non-targeted hunting, and occasional inadvertent snare trapping. A 2008 census located around 750 individuals, consistent with a 2005 census. The estimated number was reduced in 2020 when a study on the remaining habitat estimated there may be as few as 125 to 336 individuals. In 1978, the Fanjingshan National Nature Reserve was established, covering the entire range of the gray snub-nosed monkey, this area was subsequently designated a UNESCO Biosphere Reserve in 1986. In 2018, Fanjingshan was designated a World Heritage Site composed of Fanjingshan National Nature Reserve, Yinjiang Yangxi Provincial Nature Reserve, and a small area of National Non-Commercial Forest.

== See also ==
- List of endangered and protected species of China
