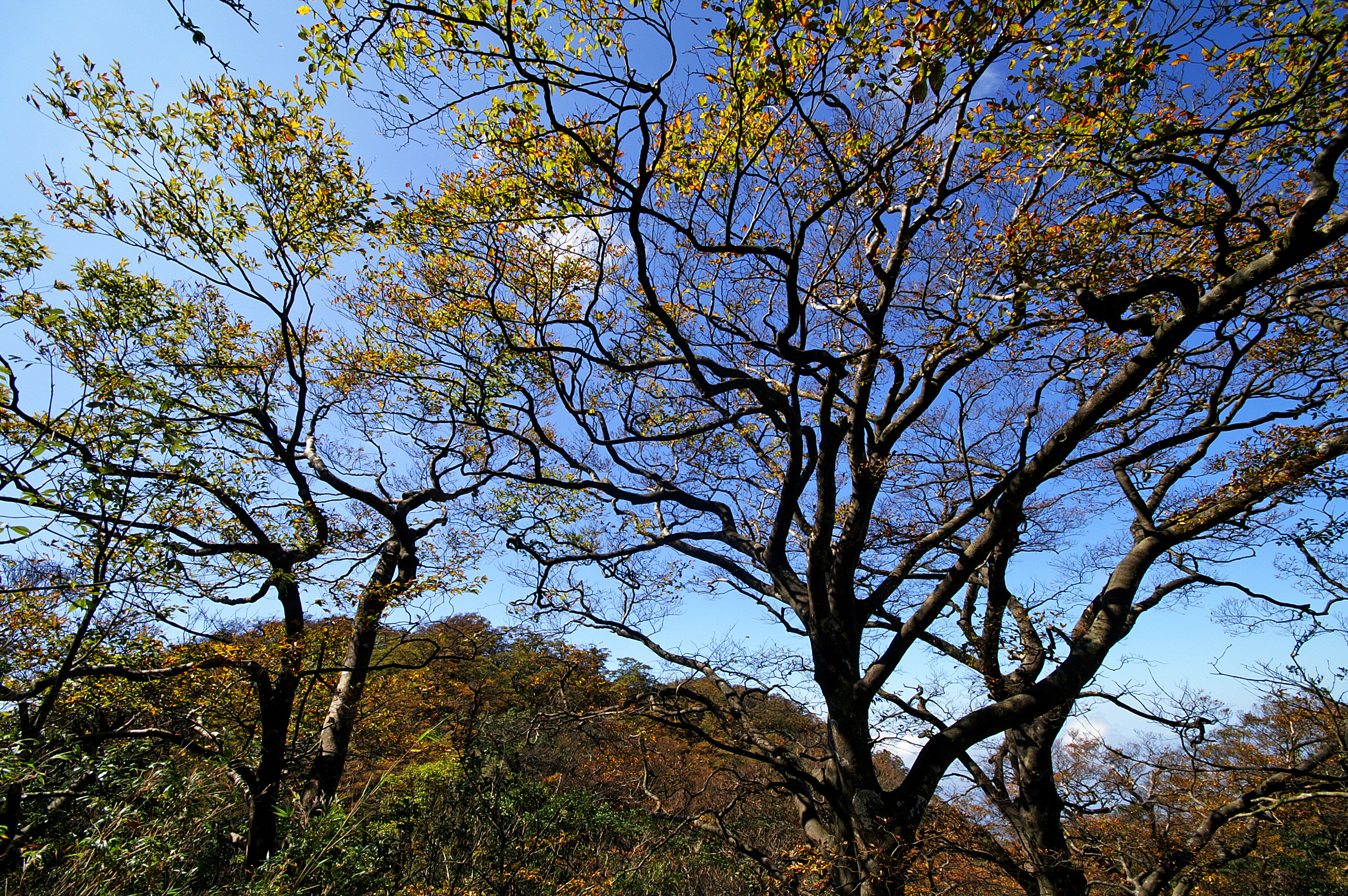

Conservation status
- Vulnerable (IUCN 2.3)

Scientific classification
- Kingdom: Plantae
- Clade: Embryophytes
- Clade: Tracheophytes
- Clade: Spermatophytes
- Clade: Angiosperms
- Clade: Eudicots
- Clade: Rosids
- Order: Fagales
- Family: Fagaceae
- Genus: Fagus
- Species: F. hayatae

Binomial name
- Fagus hayatae Palibin ex Hayata

= Fagus hayatae =

Species of beech

Fagus hayatae, also known as Taiwan beech, is a species of beech tree. It can grow 20 metres (66 ft) tall. It is the only beech species native to Taiwan, where it grows at higher elevations. While the International Union for Conservation of Nature reports it as endemic to Taiwan, Flora of China and Flora of Taiwan also report it from China; Flora of China reports a wide but discontinuous mainland distribution between Sichuan in the southwest to Zhejiang in the east. Large stands of the tree can be found in the Chatianshan Nature Reserve in mountains of Xinbei and Taoyuan, and on the Taiwan Beech Trail (台灣山毛櫸國家步道) near Cuifeng Lake in Yilan.
