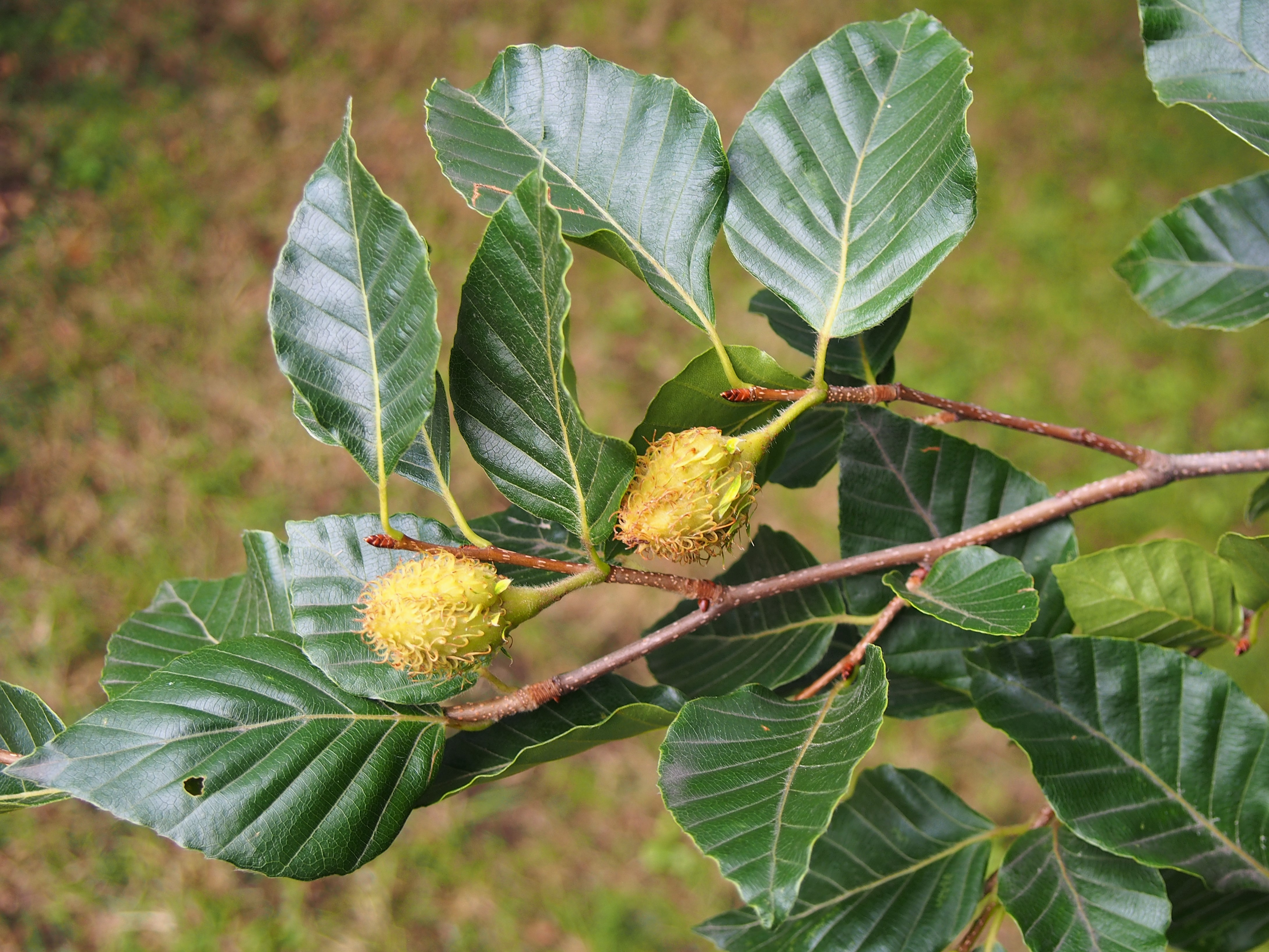

Scientific classification
- Kingdom: Plantae
- Clade: Tracheophytes
- Clade: Angiosperms
- Clade: Eudicots
- Clade: Rosids
- Order: Fagales
- Family: Fagaceae
- Genus: Fagus
- Species: F. lucida

Binomial name
- Fagus lucida Rehder & E. H. Wilson

= Fagus lucida =

Species of beech

Fagus lucida is a species of tree in the family Fagaceae. It is a tree up to 25 metres (82 ft) tall native to southern and eastern China. Seeds and young leaves are edible.
