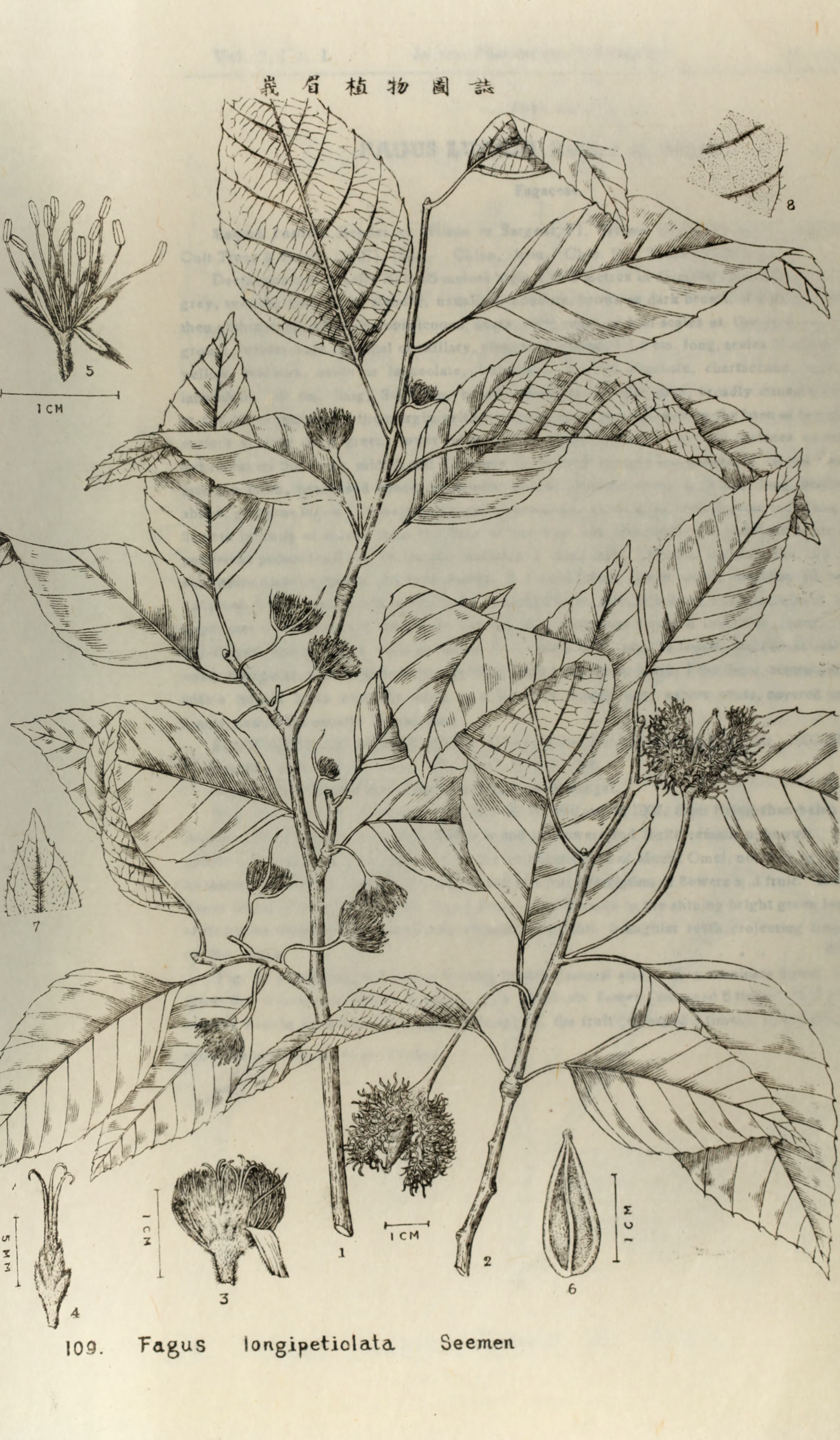
- Botanical illustration

Scientific classification
- Kingdom: Plantae
- Clade: Tracheophytes
- Clade: Angiosperms
- Clade: Eudicots
- Clade: Rosids
- Order: Fagales
- Family: Fagaceae
- Genus: Fagus
- Species: F. sinensis

Binomial name
- Fagus sinensis Oliv.

Synonyms
- List: Fagus bijiensis Y.T.Wei & Y.T.Chang; Fagus brevipetiolata Hu; Fagus clavata Y.T.Chang; Fagus longipetiolata Seemen; Fagus longipetiolata f. clavata (Y.T.Chang) Y.T.Chang; Fagus longipetiolata f. yunnanica Y.T.Chang; Fagus sylvatica var. longipes Oliv.; Fagus tientaiensis Liou

= Fagus sinensis =

Species of plant

Fagus sinensis, the long-petiole beech, is a species of flowering plant in the family Fagaceae. It is native to central and southern China and northern Vietnam. A slow-growing tree reaching 25 m (82 ft) and spreading to half as wide, the Royal Horticultural Society recommends it for its yellow fall foliage, but only for "architectural" applications in large gardens. Cold-hardy, it is available from commercial nurseries.
