= Xylococculus betulae =

Scientific classification
- Kingdom: Animalia
- Phylum: Arthropoda
- Class: Insecta
- Order: Hemiptera
- Suborder: Sternorrhyncha
- Family: Xylococcidae
- Genus: Xylococculus
- Species: X. betulae

Binomial name
- Xylococculus betulae (Pergande, 1898)

Species of insect

Xylococculus betulae is a species of scale insect.
