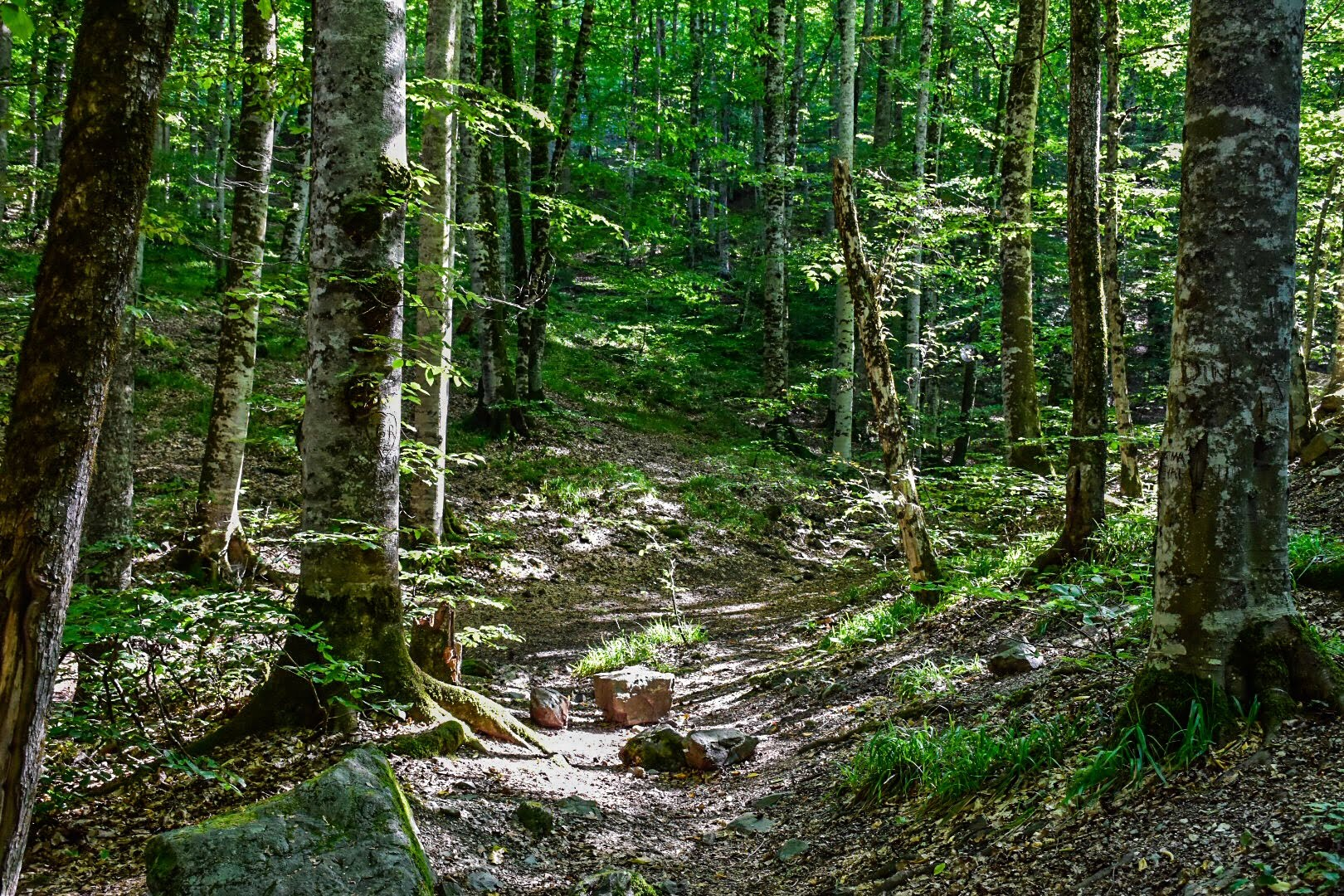
- Oriental beech in Yedigöller National Park, northwestern Turkey
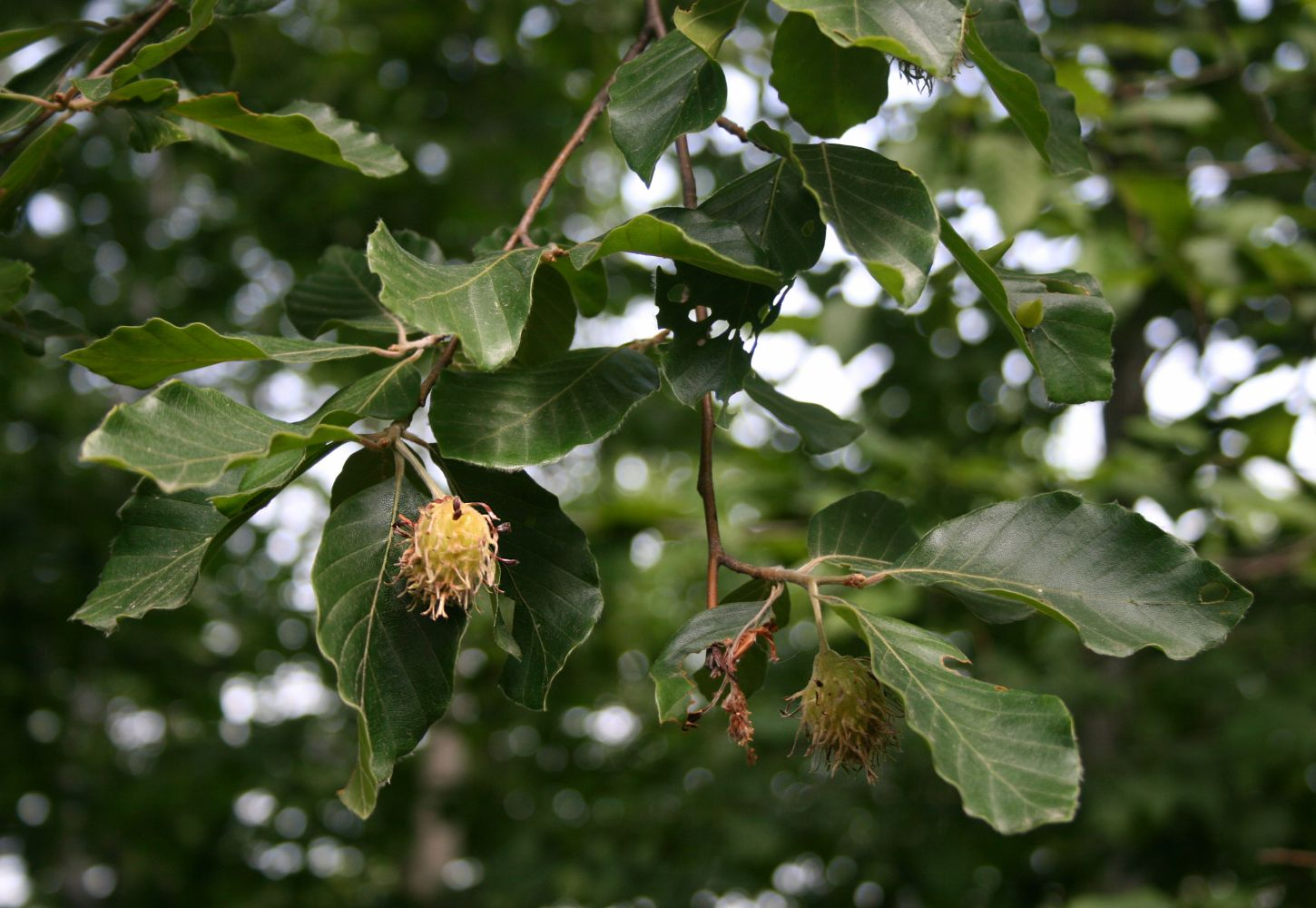
- foliage and fruit, Karacasu, Bolu, northwestern Turkey

Conservation status
- Least Concern (IUCN 3.1)

Scientific classification
- Kingdom: Plantae
- Clade: Embryophytes
- Clade: Tracheophytes
- Clade: Angiosperms
- Clade: Eudicots
- Clade: Rosids
- Order: Fagales
- Family: Fagaceae
- Genus: Fagus
- Species: F. orientalis

Binomial name
- Fagus orientalis Lipsky
- Distribution map

Synonyms
- Fagus macrophylla (Hohen. ex A.DC.) Koidz. (1916), non Unger (1854), fossil name.; Fagus orientalis var. dentata V.V.Byalt & Firsov; Fagus pyramidalis Litv.; Fagus sieboldii var. asiatica (A.DC.) Koehne; Fagus sieboldii var. macrophylla (Hohen. ex A.DC.) Koehne; Fagus sylvatica var. asiatica A.DC.; Fagus sylvatica var. macrophylla Hohen. ex A.DC.; Fagus sylvatica subsp. orientalis (Lipsky) Greuter & Burdet

= Fagus orientalis =

Species of beech

Fagus orientalis, the Oriental beech, is a deciduous tree in the family Fagaceae. It is native to Thrace in the southeastern Balkans in Europe, and Turkey in Western Asia.

== Description ==
Fagus orientalis is a large tree, capable of reaching heights of up to 45 m (148 ft) tall and 3 m (9.8 ft) trunk diameter, though more typically 25–35 m (82–115 ft) tall and up to 1.5 m (4 ft 11 in) trunk diameter. Like all beeches, it has smooth, grey bark.

The leaves are alternate, simple, and entire or with a slightly crenate margin, 7–15 cm (2.8–5.9 in) long and 5–9 cm (2.0–3.5 in) broad, with 7–13 veins on each side of the leaf (6–7 veins in F. sylvatica). The buds are long and slender, 15–30 millimetres (0.59–1.18 in) long and 2–3 mm (0.079–0.118 in) thick, but thicker, till 4–5 mm (0.16–0.20 in), where the buds include flower buds.

The flowers are small catkins which appear shortly after the leaves in spring.

The seeds are small triangular nuts 15–20 mm (0.59–0.79 in) long and 7–10 mm (0.28–0.39 in) wide at the base; there are two nuts in each cupule, maturing in the autumn 5–6 months after pollination. The cupule differs from that of European beech (Fagus sylvatica) in having flattened, slightly leaf-like appendages at the base (which are slender, soft spines in European beech).

== Taxonomy ==
Fagus orientalis is closely related to Fagus sylvatica (European beech), and hybridises with it in the Balkans. Populations in the far northeast of Turkey and the Caucasus region have recently been split off as a separate species, Fagus hohenackeriana (Caucasian beech), and those from the Alborz mountains as Fagus caspica (Caspian beech).

== Distribution and habitat ==
The tree's natural range extends from southeastern Bulgaria's Strandja mountain range and northeastern Greece to northwest and northern Turkey, and locally in southern Turkey. It occurs in moist mountain habitats, often mixed with Abies nordmanniana.

== Use ==
The wood of Fagus orientalis is heavy, hard, strong and highly resistant to shock. These features makes it suitable for steam bending. The wood is also a source to fuelwood and can be used for constructions particleboard, furniture, flooring veneer, mining poles, railway tiles and paper.

== See also ==
- Caucasus mixed forests ecoregion — key species in the ecoregion
