= List of olive cultivars =

Olives grown for use by humans

There are hundreds of cultivars of the olive (Olea europaea). As one of the oldest and more important domesticated crops raised by humans, the olive tree has diverged naturally and with the assistance of humans into many varieties. Olive cultivars are first and foremost divided into their location of origin; most names for cultivars come from place names. Secondarily, olives may be preferred for olive oil production or for eating as table olives, though many cultivars are dual-purpose.

== Table of olives ==
Name	Image	Origin	Description
Aglandau (Blanquette, Plant d'Aix, Verdale de Carpentras)		France, Australia, Azerbaijan and Ukraine	Known as Beruguette as a table olive. Known as Nichitskaia in Azerbaijan and Ukraine.
Aloreña		Spain	The area is primarily in the Valle del Guadalhorce, in the southeast Province of Málaga, in and around 19 towns that include Alhaurin de la Torre, Alhaurín el Grande, Almogia, Álora, Alozaina, Ardales, El Burgo, Carratraca, Cartama, Casarabonela, Coin, Guaro, Málaga, Monda, Pizarra, Ronda, Tolox, Valle de Abdalajís, and Yunquera. The tree produces an egg-shaped table olive similar to an apple in shape and color; it is sometimes referred to as the "mini apple". Synonyms: Aloreña, Azufairada, Manzanilla, Manzanilla de Alora, Manzanilla de Los Ranchos, Aloreña de Artafè, Aloreña de Artafè (Aloreña), Aloreña de Artafè (Arola), Aloreña de Iznalloz, Aloreña de Iznalloz (Aloreña). See; Manzanilla.
Amfissa		Greece	Also called the Amphissis. This is a common Greek table olive grown in Amfissa in Central Greece near the oracle of Delphi. Amfissa olives enjoy protected designation of origin (PDO) status, and are equally good for olive oil extraction. The olive grove of Amfissa, which consists of 1,200,000 olive trees, is a part of a protected natural landscape.
Arbequina		Spain	A small, brown olive native to Arbeca, grown in Aragon and Catalonia, Spain, good for eating and for oil.
Arbosana		Spain	A Spanish variety commonly grown for oil production alongside Arbequina and others, including in the United States.
Ascolano	Ripening Ascolano olives in Corning, California.	Italy	A cold-hardy table variety from the Le Marche region of Italy enjoyed as a table olive. It is also grown in California for olive oil. When harvested and milled when very ripe, the resulting olive oil can exhibit an exceedingly fruity character, described by professional tasters as redolent of tropical fruit and peaches.
Ayvalık		Turkey	Also known as Edremit, it is a popular olive type which is produced mostly for oil. The name comes from the Turkish cities in North Aegean, Ayvalık – Edremit See: Ayvalık#Olive cultivation. Local names for the Ayvalık variety include Edremit, Yağık, Şakran, Midilli, Ada Zeytini, and Adremittion.
Azeradj		Algeria	Early November harvesting produces Azeradj extra‐virgin olive oil with excellent chemical characteristics.
Barnea	Barnea at veraison	Israel	A modern dual-purpose cultivar bred originally from Kadesh Barnea in southern Israel by Professor Shimon Lavee to be disease-resistant and to produce a generous crop. The oil has a strong flavour with a hint of green leaf. Barnea is widely grown in Israel and in the southern hemisphere, particularly in Argentina, Australia, India and New Zealand. It has also been introduced to Northern California. Best pollinizer is the Picual. Also known as K-18 in Al-Jouf, Saudi Arabia, Jordan and Israel.
Beldi		Morocco	Oil cured (soaked in oil), dark brown to black, and wrinkled after curing.
Biancolilla		Southern Italy, primarily Sicily	The Biancolilla cultivar is one of the most common and one of the oldest produced in Sicily and is used mostly for oils. Its name refers to its change from a light green to a deep wine color at maturity. It does not require cross-pollination from other cultivars of olives, but is often used by growers of Nocellara del Belice for cross-pollination of those trees, which are sterile without pollination from other cultivars.
Bidni		Malta	Malta's indigenous, disease resistant, cultivar. The fruit is famously known for its superior oil and its beautiful dark violet colour at maturity.
Bosana		Italy	The most common olive grown on Sardinia. It is used mostly for oils.
Bouteillan		France	A cultivar grown in France for olive oil.
Cailletier (Taggiasca)		France, Italy	Grown primarily in the Alpes-Maritimes region near Nice and in nearby Liguria in Italy, where it is known as Taggiasca. When processed for salads it is known as Niçoise.
Calabria	Calabrian olive tree plantations	Southern Italy	Grown in the Calabria region, some of these trees can reach 16 feet (5 metres) in circumference.
Canino		Italy	
Carolea		Italy	An olive oil variety grown primarily in Basilicata and Calabria.
Casaliva		Italy	
Castelvetrano			See: Nocellara del Belice
Cayon		France	An olive oil variety grown in Southern France.
Cellina di Nardo		Italy	
Cerasuola		Southern Italy, primarily Sicily	The cerasuola cultivar is common in Sicily, especially in the Province of Trapani in Western Sicily. It is used for oils and has a high yield, often above 20%. They are drought resistant, an important feature in Sicily where there is often little or no rain from late May until the end of September. It is self-sterile, so needs cross-pollination from other cultivars in order to produce. Other common western Sicilian olives are used for this, primarily the Biancolilla and Nocellara del Belice cultivars
Cerignola		Italy	Originates from the south-eastern Italian province of Apulia, are very large, mild in flavor, and may be served either green or cured red or black.
Chemlali		Tunisia	
Chetoui		Tunisia	
Cobrançosa		Portugal	A variety cultivated in Portugal.
Conservolea		Greece	A table olive cultivar, a mainstay of the Greek olive industry, like Amphisis.
Coratina (Coratina Dolce Agogio)	,	Italy, Croatia	One of the most important Italian varieties, especially favoured in the area of Puglia, the largest olive growing area of Italy and also available in Argentina, Australia, and Northern California. This olive has a naturally high level of polyphenols, which yield a robust tasting olive oil. "Synonyms": A Racemi, Belmonte, Cima di Corato, Coratese, Grappola, Grappolina, La Valente, Olivo A Grappoli, Olivo A Raciuoppe, Racemo, Racioppa, Racioppa di Corato, Racioppo,
Cornicabra		Spain	Originating in Toledo, Spain, Cornicabra olives comprise about 12% of Spain's production. It is mainly used for oil. It is also the main variety of olive used to make olive oil in Algeria.
Domat		Turkey	A common Turkish green olive, a table olive and grown for oil
Dritta		Italy	A variety of olive tree typical of the DOP area known as Aprutino Pescarese in the province of Pescara (Abruzzo). Its olives yield an extra virgin olive oil featuring extraordinary chemical and organoleptic qualities.
Empeltre		Spain	A medium-sized black olive grown in Spain, especially along the Ebro Valley and the Balearic Islands. It is dual-purpose, though mainly used for oil.
Frantoio		Italy	Along with Leccino, Frantoio olives are a principal raw material for Italian olive oils from Tuscany. Frantoio is fruity with a stronger aftertaste than Leccino.
Galega		Portugal	Also known as Galega Vulgar, is a variety cultivated in Portugal.
Gemlik		Turkey	A variety from the Gemlik area of northern Turkey, they are small to medium-sized black olives with a high oil content. This type of olive is very common in Turkey and is sold as a breakfast olive in the cured formats of either Yagli Sele, Salamura or Duble, though there are other less common curings. The sign of a traditionally cured Gemlik olive is that the flesh comes away from the pit easily.
Gentile di Chieti (Nostrana)		Italy	Italian variety typical of the Abruzzo region.
Germaine		Corsica, Italy	Also: Ghjermana (Ghjermana de Balagne), Ghermana or Germana. Dual purpose, resistance to cold weather, 30% high yield, and black when ripe.
Gordal (Queen olive)		Seville and Andalusia, Spain	Table olive. The name means "the fat one" because of the large size.
Grossane		France	
Halkidiki		Greece	Very large table olives from the Halkidiki region of Greece; also called gaidouria, donkey olives.
Hojiblanca		Spain	Native to Lucena in the province of Córdoba, Spain; its oil is widely appreciated for its slightly bitter flavour.
Hondroelia		Greece	('Hondro=thick' olive, due to its size). A rare olive from Astros, blond, traditionally cured in salt.
İzmir Sofralık		Turkey	A Turkish olive mostly grown for olive oil.
Kalamata		Greece	A large, black olive with a smooth and meatlike taste, is named after the city of Kalamata, Greece, and is used as a table olive. These olives are usually preserved in wine, vinegar or olive oil. Kalamata olives enjoy PDO status, and olives of this same cultivar grown outside the Kalamata region are marketed in the EU as Kalamon olives.
Koroneiki		Greece and other areas	Originated from the southern Peloponnese area of Greece, around Kalamata and Mani. This small olive, though difficult to cultivate, has a high yield of olive oil of exceptional quality. Also known as Koroni, Kritikia, Ladolia, Lianolia, Psilolia, and Vaciki.
Kothreiki		Greece	A dual-purpose cultivar for oil and table olives.
Lechín de Sevilla (also Ecijana or Zorzaleña)		Spain	Ranked fourth in terms of land coverage with 190,000 hectares (470,000 acres). This is an important variety in Andalusia, predominantly in the province of Seville. It is also cultivated in the bordering provinces of Córdoba, Cadiz, and the Málaga. The oil has a fruitiness with the presence of green, bitter, light almond, and pungent attributes that is slightly astringent and smooth on the palate.
Leccino		Italy	Along with Frantoio cultivars, Leccino olives are the principal raw material for Italian olive oils from Tuscany. Leccino has a mild sweet flavour.
Lugano		Italy	
Lucques		France	Found in the south of France (Aude département). They are green, large, and elongated. The stone has an arcuated (bow) shape. Their flavour is mild and nutty.
Maalot		Israel	A disease-resistant Eastern Mediterranean cultivar derived from the Tunisian Chemlali cultivar. The olive is medium-sized, round, has a fruity flavour and is used almost exclusively for oil production.
Manzanilla		Spain	A large, rounded-oval fruit, with purple-green skin, originated in Dos Hermanas, Seville, in southern Spain. "Manzanillas" means little apples in Spanish. Known for a rich taste and thick pulp, it is a prolific bearer, grown around the world. Cross breeding: Hybridization of the Picholine and Manzanillo (Bellini et al. 2002b) resulted in the newer cultivars Arno, Tevere, and Basento.
Mastoidis		Greece	A Greek table olive cultivar similar to Tsounati.
Megaritiki		Greece	A dual-purpose cultivar for both oil and table olives.
Memecik		Turkey	Main cultivar of the Aydin Province in the Aegean Region; also grown in the Mugla Province (Milas) and some districts of İzmir Province. Synonyms: Tas, Arası, Aşıyeli, "Gülümbe", "Şehir", and "Yağlık".
Memeli		Turkey	A Turkish olive used for split green olives, green olives in brine, black olives and olive oil. Clingstone.
Meslalla		Morocco	A Moroccan green olive used for olive oil production, pickled in garlic and hot peppers. It is also used in tagines.
Mission		United States	Originated on the California Missions and now grown throughout the state. They are black and generally used for table consumption.
Morrut (Morruda and Regués)		Spain	Grown in the region of Montsià-Baix Ebre, in the province of Tarragona, and the northern part of Castellón, the fruit exhibits spiciness and a slight bitterness with almond and green apple flavours. This variety, along with Sevillenca and Farga are under the Oil of Baix Ebre-Montsía Designation of Origin. Morrut is not as hearty as other varieties, being sensitive to cold and drought. There has not been much expansion with only about 30,000 hectares (74,000 acres).
Nabali		Israel	Originating in Israel, and known locally as Baladi, it is also used widely in Jordan and in the Hauran region of Syria.
Nafplion		Greece	A small green olive grown only in the Argos valley in Greece. Nafplion olives are traditionally cracked and cured in brine.
Nevadillo Blanco			See: Hojiblanca
Niçoise (See: Cailletier)		France	Grown around Nice and French Riviera
Nocellara del Belice		Italy	A large green olive cultivar primarily grown in Sicily. Also known as Castelvetrano olives in the United States, they have a mild, buttery flavor that makes them popular table olives, though they are also used to produce olive oil.
Nocellara Etnea (also Augghialora, Paturnisa, and Tortorella)		Apulia and central and eastern parts of Sicily	16% oil yield with 0.6% acidity, leaves are medium-sized lanceolate and slightly tapered. Taste is fruity with organoleptic properties of green tomato, leaf of grass, almond, thistle, or artichoke.
Nyons		South of France	The first olive cultivar in France to receive the Appellation d’Origine Contôlée (AOC) accreditation in 1994. To be designated Nyons Olives, the olive must be of the Tanche variety, and grown within the specified AOC (Now AOP) zone.
Oliana		Spain	
Olivière		France	
Patrinia		Greece	A Greek variety of olive tree grown primarily in Aigialeia, Greece, and the Farres region of West Achaia.
Picholine		France	Grown in the south of France. It is green, medium size, and elongated. The flavour is mild and nutty.
Picual		Spain	From southern Spain (province of Jaén), the Picual is the most widely cultivated olive in Spain, comprising about 50% of Spain's olive production and around 20% of world olive production. It has a strong but sweet flavour, and is widely used in Spain as a table olive. With the global cultivation of the tree there are many subvarieties and synonyms.
Ravece, also known as Rotondela		Italy	DOP designation
Sabine olive		France	
Salkini		Syria, Lebanon, Jordania	
Salonenque		France	
Sevillano		Spain, California	Synonyms: Callosina (Callolina, Cornicabra, Cornicabra Blanco, Cornicabra Parda, Cornicabra Parda de Villena, Picúa, Yeclana) Campanil (Campanillo, Campanita, Campanita de Ecija, Manzanilla, Manzanilla Real, Manzanilla Cordobés, and Sevillano), Caspolina (Gordal Sevillana, Basta, and Sevillana de Caspe), Gordal Sevillana (Branquita, Forna, Manzanera, Manzanet, Manzaneta, Manzanilla de la Rivera, Mochonenca, Vall de Gallinera, Vall de Gallinera, and Vall de Gallinera), Villalonga Manzanilla Prieta (Bolondo, Manzanilla Basta, Manzanilla Negra, Manzanilla Serrana, Manzanilla Cordobí, Manzanilla Fino, Morisca, Perillo, Perito, Picudo, Varetuda), Pico Limón (Pico Limón de Grazalema, Morisca, Manzanilla del Piquito, Pico Cuervo and Nevadillo de Madridejos), Picual, Sevillano de Jumilla, and Villalonga,
Sevillenca (Serrana)		Spain	Synonyms: Falguera in Castellón and Valencia, Mas de Bot or Morrudel in Tarragona, also in Valencia referred to as Serrana de la Sierra, or Serraneta in Valencia, Sevillenc or Solivenc in Tarragona, and Serrana, or Serrana de Espadán in Castellón, Tarragona, Teruel, and Valencia where it has been awarded Protected Designation of Origin (PDO) status especially in the Serra d'Espadà and Sierra Calderona areas, and exported to the UK, Italy, Germany, France, Austria, Luxembourg, Belgium, the Netherlands, Denmark, Poland, Czech Republic, Hungary, Switzerland, Ireland, Slovakia, Slovenia, Romania, Lithuania, Latvia, Estonia, Finland, Bulgaria, Greece, Sweden, Croatia, Norway, and Serbia.
Chiquitta		Spain	
Souri		Lebanon, Israel	Named after the town of Sur (Tyre) and mainly cultivated in Southern Lebanon. It is also relatively widespread in the rest Levant, has a high oil yield and exceptionally aromatic flavour.
'Swan Hill’		Australia	Often grown as an ornamental for producing virtually no allergenic pollen or dropped fruit; A fruitless olive cultivar originally patented as PP4,578; 'Swan Hill' is the only cultivar name ever publicly disclosed, and the plant is now in the public domain.
Tanche		France	Dual-use black olive with a yield of 22–25%.
Thassos		Greece	The only cultivar that can be eaten straight from the tree when ripe.
Throumbolia		Greece	A dual-purpose cultivar for both oil and table use.
Tsounati		Greece	See Mastoidis
Verdale-de-l'Hérault		France	
Verdial		Spain	

== See also ==
- Lists of cultivars
