= Manzanilla olive =

Olive cultivar

Manzanilla
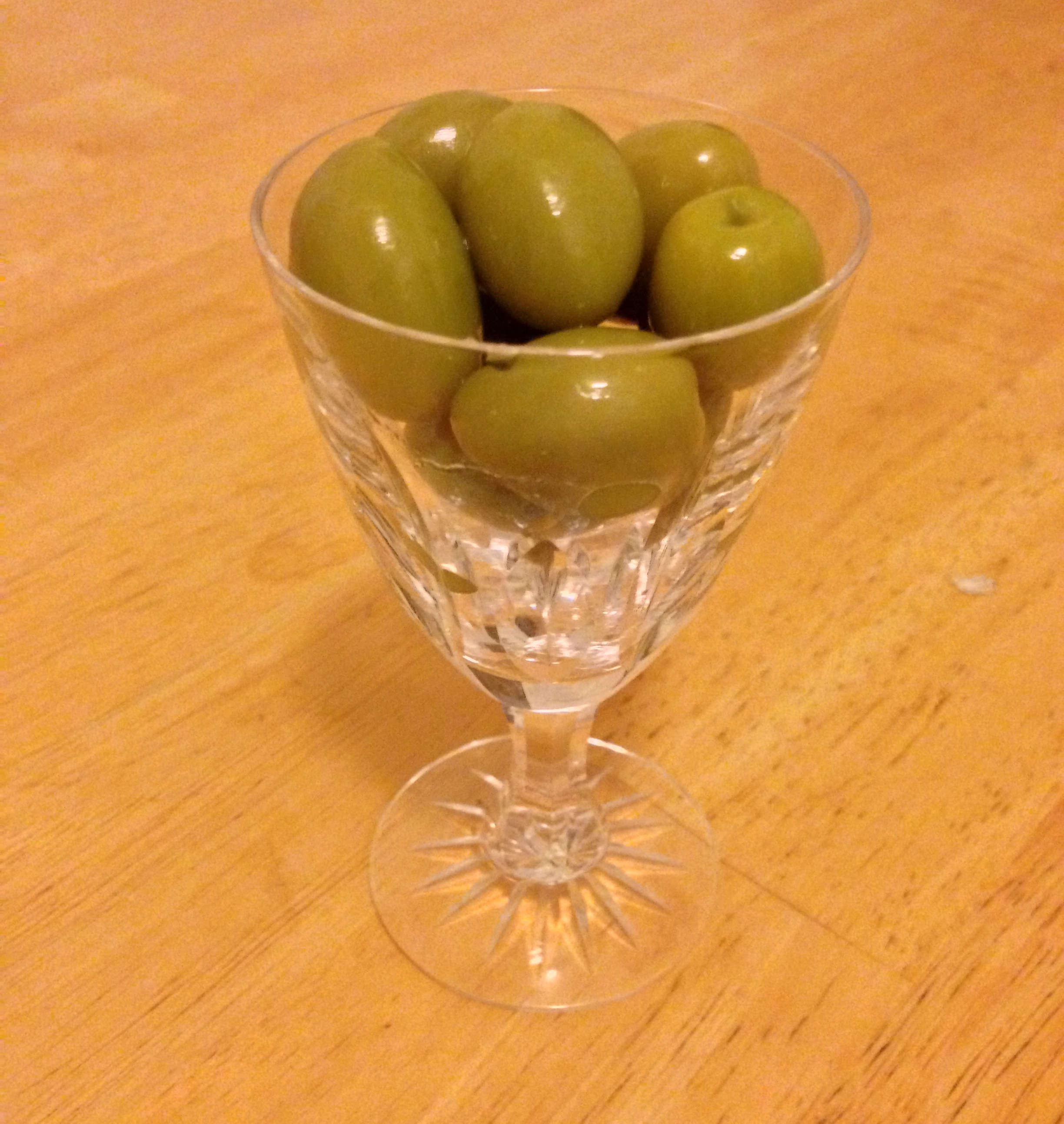

Olive (Olea europaea)
- Origin: Spain, California
- Notable regions: Seville
- Use: Table and oil
- Oil content: Low
- Growth form: Spreading
- Leaf: Elliptic
- Weight: Medium to large
- Shape: Ovoid
- Symmetry: Asymmetrical

Manzanilla olives ("man-zah-nee-ya") or Manzanillo, also Manzanilla de Sevilla (in Spain), originally from the area of Seville, Spain, are sometimes referred to as Spanish olives but along with Arbosana, Arbequina, Cacereña, Hojiblanca, Empeltre, and Gordal there are over two hundred varieties grown in Spain as well as other areas.

Manzanillo olives are versatile, they can be used as table olives and for making olive oil. Manzanillo olive cultivars are grown in many geographic areas around the world. Canned Manzanillo olives are either green in colour or the popular black coloured variety that is manufactured using the "California black-ripe" curing method.

== Synonyms ==
There are over two hundred olive varieties grown in Spain. Synonyms include Early Manzanillo, Romerillo, Redondil, Manzanillo Fino, Chorrúo de Espiga, Manzanilla olive, Manzanilla Rabuda, Common chamomile, Chamomile Basta, Chamomile of Carmona, Long, olive White Chamomile, Camomile of Two Sisters, and Varetuda.

=== Closely related varieties ===
"Manzanilla Cacereña" along with "Manzanilla de Sevilla" (a vecera variety) are found in high-density orchards. Askal is a hybrid of Barnea and Manzanillo. Arno, Tevere, and Basento are hybrids of Picholine and Manzanillo. Manzanillo Cacereño i-69 is a potential for superintensive olive trees in hedges.

== Characteristics ==
Manzanilla olives are dual-purpose medium to large drupe or stone fruit of the Olea europaea tree, used as table olives and for olive oil production. Table olives can be whole with the pit in, pitted and stuffed with pimentos, garlic, peppers, or almonds, or sliced.

== Curing ==
Curing is a process to remove bitter phenolic compounds that include oleuropein and ligstroside found in the flesh and skin.

== California black olives ==
Manzanillas have been a popular variety in California since the 1960s. The "California black-ripe" curing method, developed circa 1905–1910, has led to the Manzanilla variety mainly being used for canned black olives. These are labeled as "ripe" green olives that have been cured. The process involves lye-curing in an oxygenated solution, that takes approximately 24 hours instead of six to eight weeks, and treatment with ferrous gluconate that fixes the black color. The olives are then placed in cans in mild brine, then pressured and heat processed.

== Other areas of cultivation ==
The Mediterranean area soil and phenological events has proven to be ideal for Manzanilla, but other areas also cultivate the variety. The winter chilling must be enough to allow flowering after dormancy, known as vernalization. Warmer weather allows "bud burst" and flowers that set fruit. The chilling weather should not go below 2.2 °F (−16.6 °C) or the plant may be damaged.

=== New olive cultivars ===
With advancement of health benefits of the Mediterranean diet there has been a sharp rise in the consumption and use of olives and olive oil. The traditional cultivation systems have a steady but lower yield than is commercially viable, so newer alternative cultivars are sought that can be adapted to different geographical areas and mechanized harvesting. With more than two thousand recorded cultivars, clones or sub-clones, the use of various forms of grafting, free, cross- and self-pollination of trees creating hybrids, research is continually ongoing to find genetically dominant cultivars. Backcrossing or recurrent hybridization is also used.

==== Australia ====
With over eleven million trees in Australia covering 35,000 hectares (86,000 acres) the Manzanilla has shown to adapt to the climate.

==== Florida ====
Manzanilla trees are pest and disease resistant, self-pollinating, and can survive temperatures as low as 12 °F. The University of Florida North Florida Research and Education Center planted five different types of olive cultivars to research if olives could be established in Florida. The climate does not get cold enough for the trees to become dormant, but growers have put liquid CO_{2} into the ground as a means to create dormancy.

==== Louisiana ====
Louisiana State University Agricultural Center has been performing field evaluations on fifteen varieties near Hammond and the Manzanilla has shown as one variety that could be cultivated south of the I-10/I-12 corridor for small crops or as ornamental trees.

==== Latin America ====
Mexico, Peru, Chile, Argentina, and Uruguay produce olives and olive oil.

==== Texas ====
Olive trees are considered an exotic crop in Texas. The Arbequina, Arbosana, Frantoio, Manzanilla, Mission, Pendolino, and Picual are grown but the Pendolino is a poor performer and planted to pollinate the Manzanilla. A severe freeze can kill olive trees, so the best area is north of Laredo and southwest of San Antonio, in the region known as the Winter Garden.

== See also ==
- List of olive cultivars
