= Agriculture in Texas =

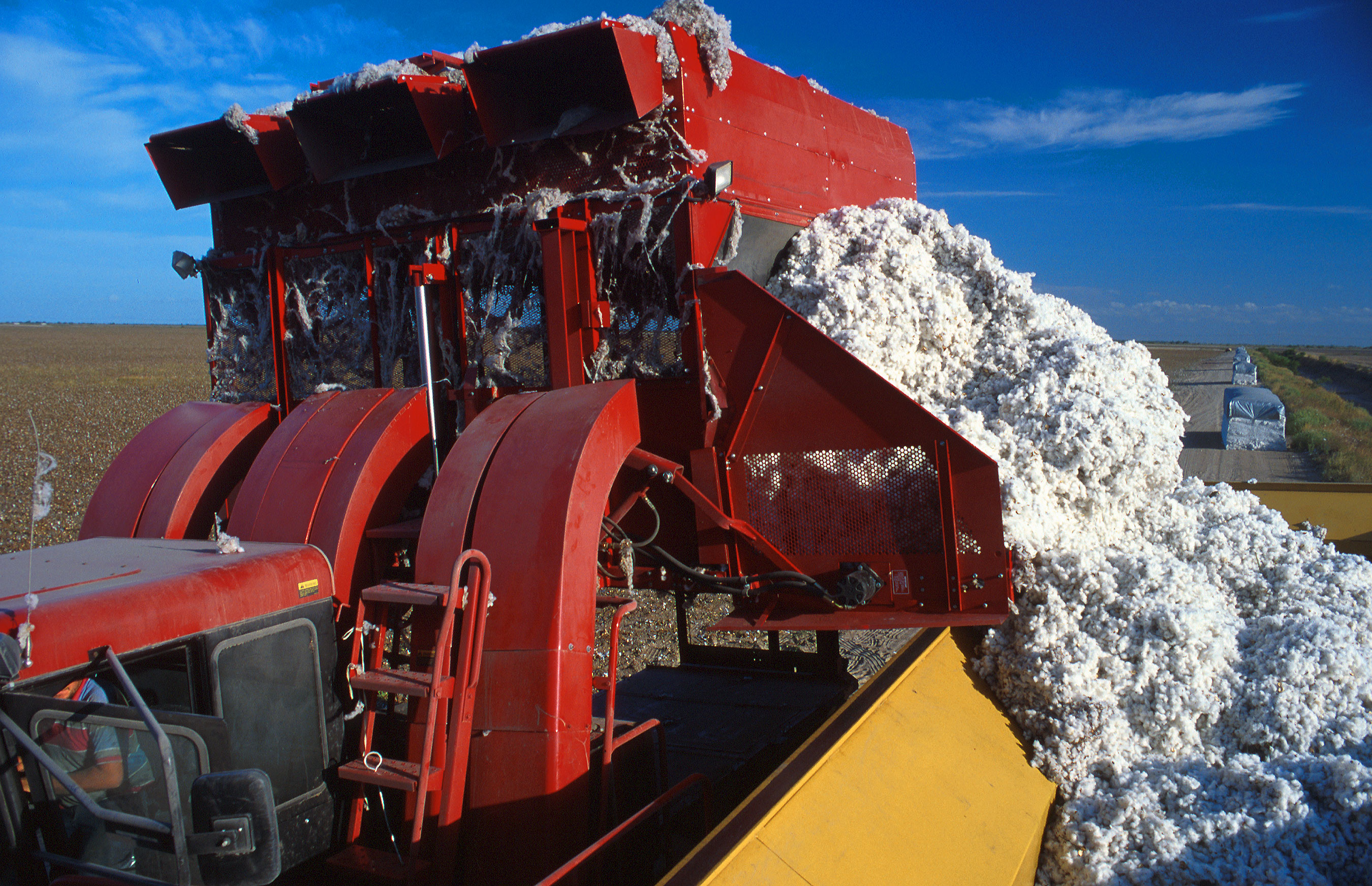
Offloading freshly harvested cotton into a module builder. Previously built modules can be seen in the background.

Texas has the most farms of all United States both in terms of number and size. Agriculture is a major contributor to the economy of Texas and is the primary land use in the state. It is the country's leading producer of livestock. Wine production in Texas is significant, although small by global standards. The state is a major producer of rice as well as the top producer of cotton in the US.

== History ==
Maize agriculture began on the Great Plains by AD 900, initiating the Southern Plains villagers period of western Oklahoma and Texas. It probably came about as an extension westward and northward of the Caddoan cultures of eastern Texas. The Plains Village culture consisted of hamlets and semi-permanent villages along major rivers such as the Red, Washita, and Canadian. Subsistence was a combination of agriculture and hunting. A drying climatic trend beginning AD 1000 or 1100 may have tipped the subsistence scale more toward hunting and less toward a dependence upon agriculture. The Antelope Creek Phase of Plains villagers, dated from AD 1200 to 1450 in the Texas panhandle was influenced by the Southwestern Pueblo people of the Rio Grande valley in New Mexico. The historic descendants of the Southern Plains villagers are possibly the Wichita and Pawnee Indians.

Staples of indigenous Texan agriculture which remain important in the 21st century are corn, beans, squash, pecans, and prickly pear.

Ranching was introduced to Texas by Spanish settlers with the first cattle being in the Rio Grande valley, it had become established by 1680. Early vaqueros, the predecessors to the cowboys, served as independent contractors to the powerful landowners. In 1778 the Spanish crown imposed a controversial Fondo de Mestenos, Mustang Tax, on all cattle and horses which was not revoked until 1795. Cattle drives out of Texas to market destinations became prominent around this time.

The Mexican War of Independence caused the collapse of much of the organized agriculture in Texas. American settlers began moving into Texas and setting up farms and ranches. This increased after the Texas Revolution and Mexican-American War.

Cultivation of mung bean here began during World War II when a Chinese native by the name of Henry Huie – who worked as a U.S. Army cook – planted the staple crop in the clay plains near Vernon.

=== History of Texas A&M University ===
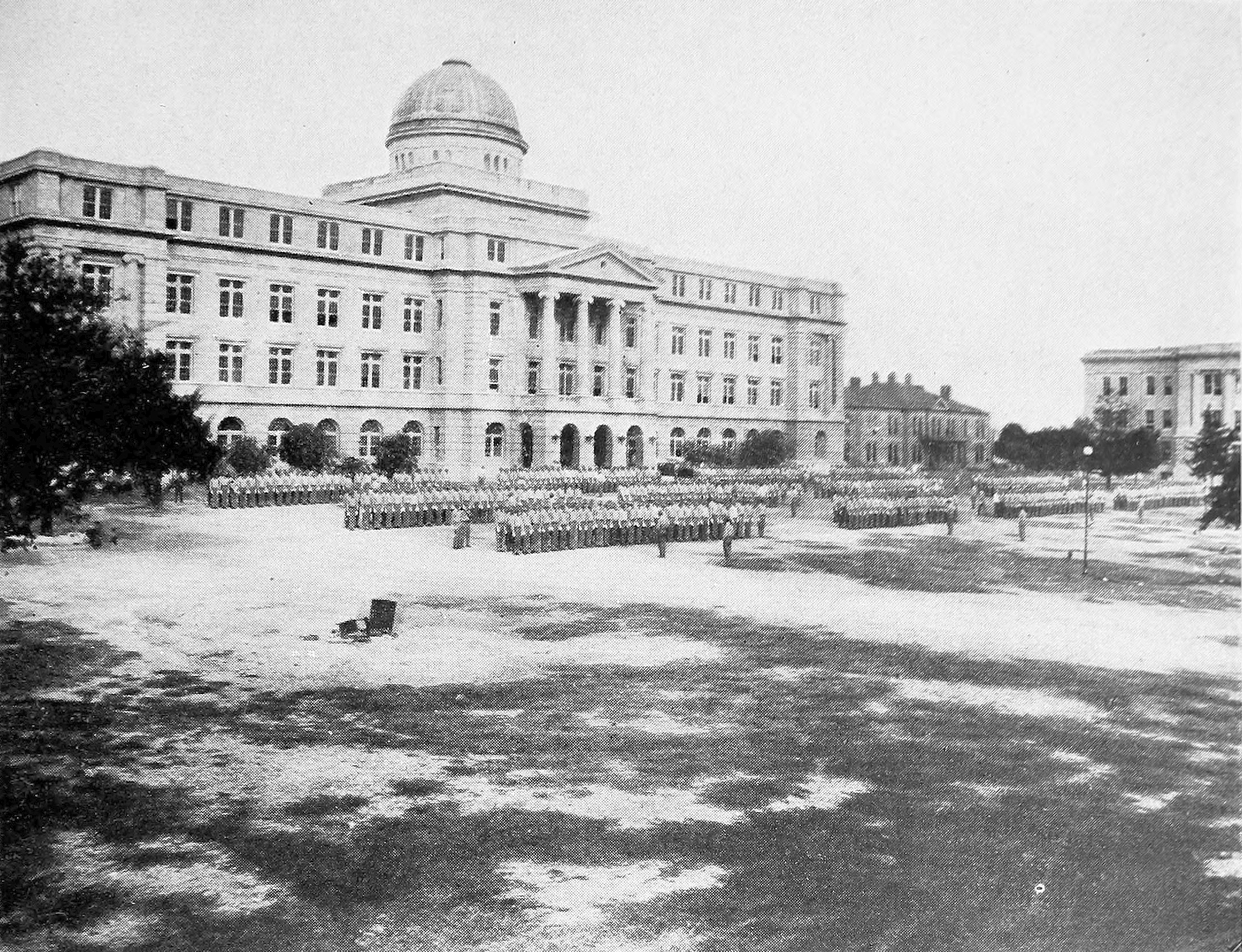
Main building and Cadet Corps of Agricultural and Mechanical College, 1916

The history of Texas A&M University, the first public institution of higher education in Texas, began in 1871, when the Agricultural and Mechanical College of Texas was established as a land-grant college by the Reconstruction-era Texas Legislature. Classes began on October 4, 1876. Although Texas A&M was originally scheduled to be established under the Texas Constitution as a branch of the yet-to-be-created University of Texas, subsequent acts of the Texas Legislature never gave the university any authority over Texas A&M. In 1875, the Legislature separated the administrations of A&M and the University of Texas, which still existed only on paper.

For much of its first century, enrollment at Texas A&M was restricted to men who were willing to participate in the Corps of Cadets and receive military training. During this time, a limited number of women were allowed to attend classes but forbidden from gaining a degree. During World War I, 49% of A&M graduates were in military service, and in 1918, the senior class was mustered into military service to fight in France. During World War II, Texas A&M produced over 20,000 combat troops, contributing more officers than both the United States Military Academy and United States Naval Academy combined.

Shortly after World War II, the Texas Legislature redefined Texas A&M as a university and the flagship school of the Texas A&M University System, making official the school's status as a clear and separate institution from the University of Texas. In the 1960s, the state legislature renamed the school Texas A&M University, with the "A&M" becoming purely symbolic. Under the leadership of James Earl Rudder, the school became racially integrated and coeducational. Membership in the Corps of Cadets became voluntary.

In the second half of the 20th century, the university was recognized for its research with the designations sea-grant university and space-grant university. The school was further honored in 1997 with the establishment of the George Bush Presidential Library on the western edge of the campus.

== Livestock ==
Texas leads the nation in number of cattle, usually exceeding 16 million head. The sprawling 320,000 deeded acres (130,000 ha) La Escalera Ranch, located 20 miles (32 km) south of Fort Stockton, is one of the largest cattle ranches in the Southwestern United States.

Texas leads nationally in production of sheep and goat products. Mills County bills itself as the "Meat Goat Capital of America." Goat production has increased both as a result of more demand for goat meat and because of decreasing average property sizes. Angora goats are also raised for fiber.

== Cereal ==
Texas is a leader in cereal crop production. Three counties in the state—Colorado, Wharton, and Matagorda—take advantage of water from the Lower Colorado River Authority to grow rice and are responsible for about 5% of annual U.S. rice production. The water supply from the Colorado River has been limited cut off during severe drought.

=== Rice ===
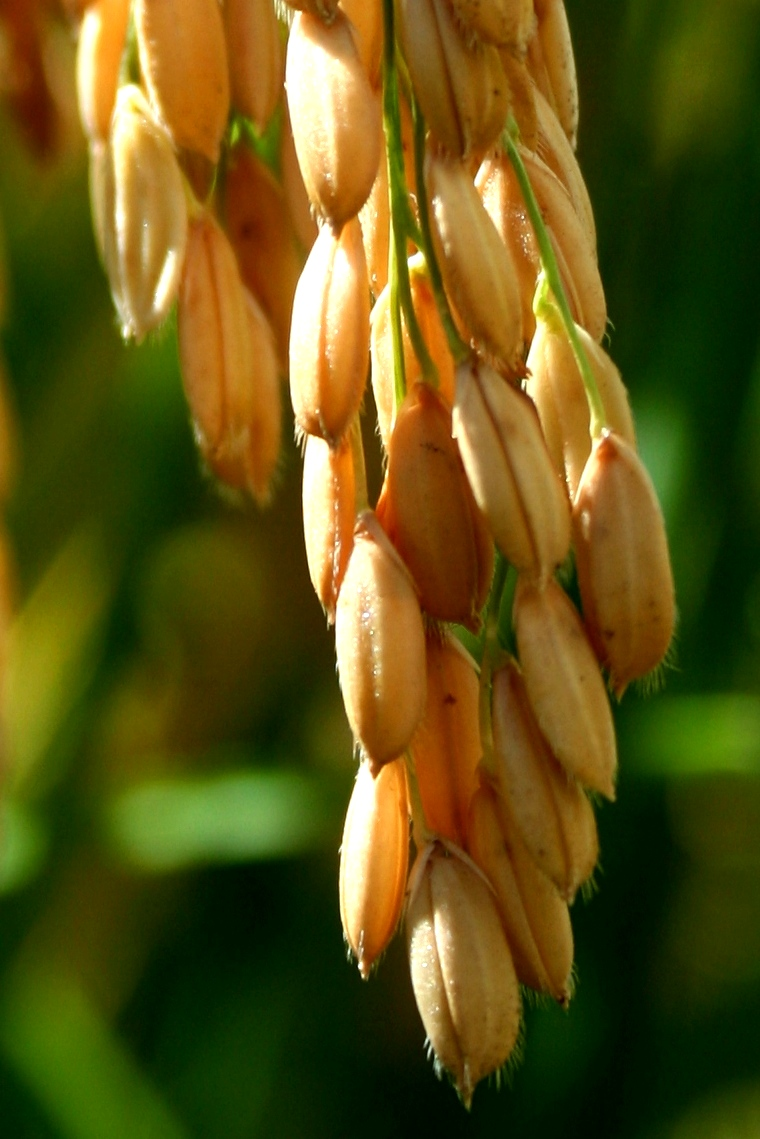
Grains of rice

Rice production in Texas began in 1853 in southeast Texas. By 1903, the acres of cultivated rice in Texas was second only to Louisiana and together accounted for 99 percent of rice production in United States. While other states have surpassed Texas in rice production, it remains a significant Texas crop into the foreseeable future.

== Fruit ==
The Rio Grande valley is one of the best areas for the cultivation of grapefruit. Early varieties like the Duncan had many seeds and pale flesh, but in the 1880s citrus growers in Texas and Florida discovered pink-fleshed seedless grapefruit mutations like the Ruby Red, which along with red-fleshed varieties like the Rio Red and Star Ruby are preferred varieties for modern commercial production. Phomopsis stem-end rot is a common problem in grapefruit here. Burger and Davis found in 1982 that etaconazole and imazalil are effective against the post-harvest effects if Phomopsis has already occurred pre-harvest in Texas groves. Texas also produces a significant crop of Oranges. Orange production during the 2022–2023 season was 1.7 million 40-pound boxes. The Rio Grande valley's citrus industry is celebrated at the annual Citrus Fiesta.

Grapes are a common crop in some parts of Texas. Pierce's Disease (PD) is a common problem in the East and South. From 1970 to 1996, PD was unknown outside of the southern part of the state. Though thought to be impossible, in 1996 suddenly many vineyards were heavily hit in north central Texas and some were wiped out completely. PD resistance is important here due to PD's prevalence. Some areas suffer from Cotton root rot of many crops, including grape. It is so associated with this state that it is also called Texas root rot.

In the 1990s strawberry acres greatly increased especially around Poteet, however by 2004 imported strawberries had competed almost all strawberry production out of the state.

Texas is also a large producer of cantaloupes.

Olive trees are considered an exotic crop in Texas. The Arbequina, Arbosana, Frantoio, Manzanilla, Mission, Pendolino, and Picual are grown but the Pendolino is a poor performer and planted to pollinate the Manzanilla. A severe freeze can kill olive trees, so the best area is north of Laredo, Texas and southwest of San Antonio, in an area known as the Winter Garden Region.

=== Wine ===
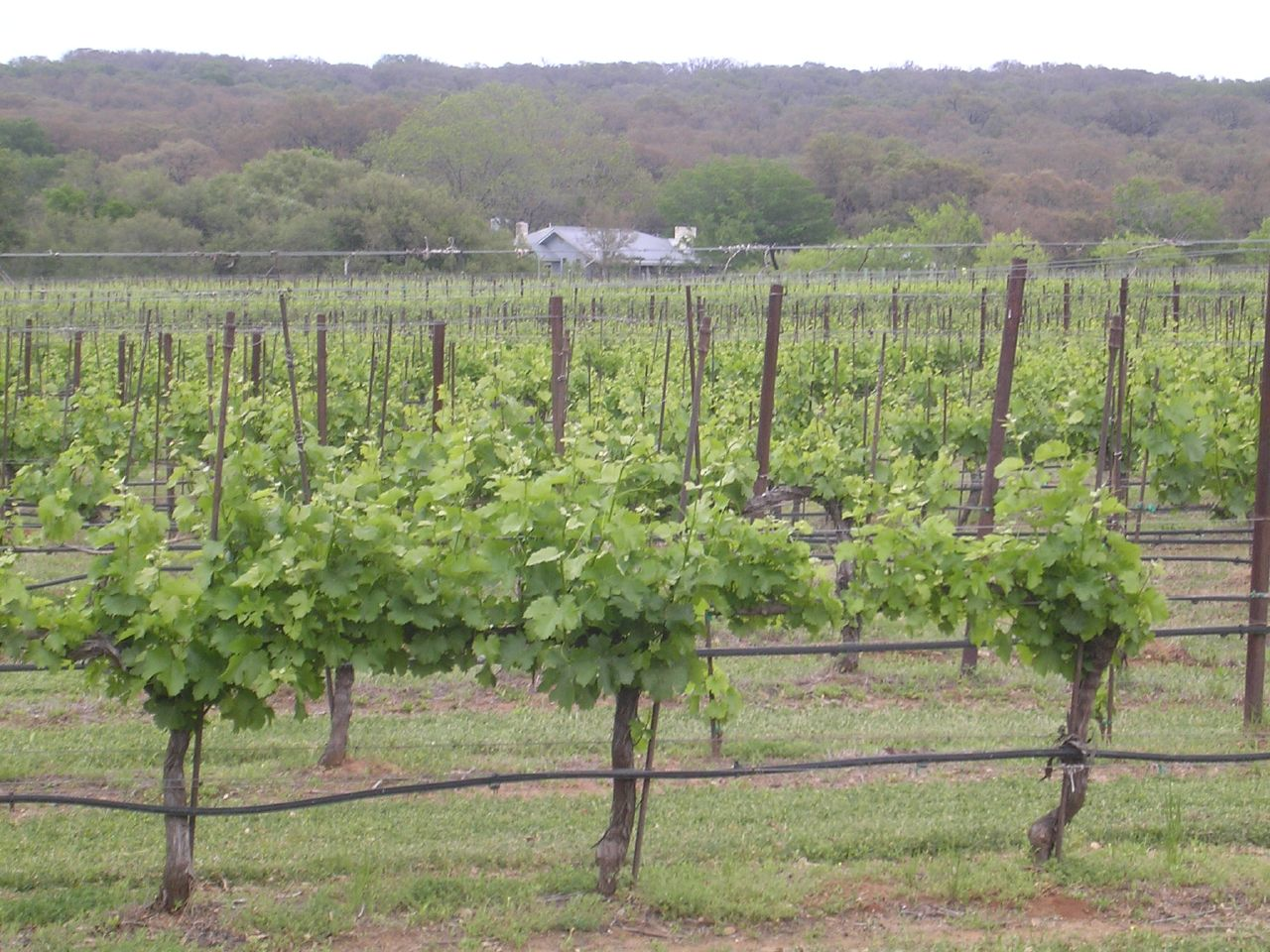
A vineyard in the Texas Hill Country AVA near Johnson City

Texas has a long history of wine production. The sunny and dry climate of the major winemaking regions in the state have drawn comparison to Portuguese wines, in addition to other regions in Europe like Spain, France, and Italy. Some of the earliest recorded Texas wines were produced by Spanish missionaries in the 1650s near El Paso. Texas ranked as the fifth largest wine producing state in 2024.

The state is home to over 42 members of the Vitis grape vine family with fifteen being native to the state, more than any other region on earth. As of 2024, the state had over 9,300 acres (3,800 ha) planted with Vitis vinifera. Despite being the largest of conterminous states, this relatively small amount of planted land is dwarfed by the production of even the smallest French AOCs like Sancerre. The Texan wine industry is continuing its steady pace of expansion and has gained a reputation as an established wine growing region in the United States.

== Vegetables ==
Texas and Arkansas are among the higher producers of spinach in North America and form the eastern limit of large scale commercial production. Major spinach pests here include Myzus persicae (Sulzer), Pegomya spp., and Circulifer tenellus (Baker).

Texas is the westernmost limit of commercial okra production. Pests include the red imported fire ant (Solenopsis invicta (Buren)), the southern green stink bug (Nezara viridula (Linnaeus)), and leaffooted bugs (various Leptoglossus spp.).

Texas is one of the largest producers of onions. Production here suffers from onion thrips (Thrips tabaci (Lindeman)) and onion maggots (Delia antiqua (Meigen)).

Texas is one of the major growers of watermelons. Whiteflies and aphids commonly vector Cucurbit viruses here. Texas A&M AgriLife Extension provides commercial production guides for both seeded and seedless. For seeded varieties they recommend Allsweet, Black Diamond, Bush Sugar Baby, Calhoun Grey, Charleston Gray, Crimson Sweet, Crimson Tide, Dixielee, Golden Crown, Jubilee, Mickylee, Minilee, Mirage, OrangeGlo, Prince Charles, Royal Jubilee, Tendersweet, and Yellow Doll; while for seedless varieties, Gem Dandy, Matrix, Summersweet 5244, Tiffany, and Tri-X 313. In both, common diseases are Alternaria, Downy Mildew, Fusarium Wilt, Gummy Stem Blight, nematodes, Powdery Mildew, and various viruses. Common insect pests are aphids, armyworm (beet armyworm and fall armyworm), Cabbage Looper, cutworm, various leafminers, various mites, thrips, webworm, and various whiteflies. AgriLife also makes recommendations for fungicide, insecticide, and herbicide control of all these in this crop, and for common weeds.

AgriLife provides many other commercial grower guides: asparagus, green/snap bean, pinto bean, table beet, broccoli, cabbage, cantaloupe/muskmelon, carrot, cauliflower, celery, Chinese cabbage, cilantro, collards/kale, pickling cucumber, slicing cucumber, eggplant, garlic, honeydew, melon, kohlrabi, leeks, lettuce, mustard greens, okra, onion, parsley, bell pepper, jalapeño, potato, pumpkin, radish, Southern pea/cowpea, spinach, squash, sweet corn, sweet potato, Swiss chard, tomato, and turnip.

== Fiber ==
Texas is 'king of cotton,' leading the nation in cotton production, its leading crop and second-most-valuable farm product.

Flax was introduced to Texas as a commercial crop in the late 1930s and production peaked in 1949 at 330,000 acres, its production never recovered after being heavily impacted by drought in the 1950s.

== Pests ==
Fire ants (Solenopsis invicta) are an invasive agricultural pest here.

Although the Asian cockroach (Blattella asahinai (Mizukubo)) is a widespread invasive species here it inflicts only minor damage on horticulturals. It also serves as an egg predator of more pestiferous insects, including corn earworm (Helicoverpa zea (Boddie)) and beet armyworm (Spodoptera exigua (Hübner)). In southern counties the roach is one of the most numerous egg predators, in row crops at ~50 roaches per metre (15/ft). The Surinam cockroach (Pycnoscelus surinamensis) is not proven to be a major pest but data is lacking. It should not be confused with the Indian cockroach (P. indica) which does not occur here.

Flea beetles, specifically the redheaded (Systena frontalis (Fabricius)) and Smartweed (S. hudsonias) are common in the east but rarely found to the west of there. They are voracious, polyphagous herbivores of both crops and weeds. Due to their affinity for weeds as well, crop protection must include weed management. The Southern tobacco flea beetle (Epitrix fasciata (Blatchley)) is found along the Gulf Coast.

== Regulation ==
=== Texas Department of Agriculture ===
The Texas Department of Agriculture (TDA) is a state agency within the state of Texas, which is responsible for matters pertaining to agriculture, rural community affairs, and related matters. It is currently headed by Agriculture Commissioner Sid Miller, a Republican, who was reelected to a 3rd term in 2022. There are multiple divisions in the Texas Department of Agriculture.

== Education ==
=== Texas A&M ===
Texas A&M University (Texas A&M, A&M, TA&M, or TAMU) is a public land-grant research university in College Station, Texas, United States. It was founded in 1876 and became the flagship institution of the Texas A&M University System in 1948. Since 2021, Texas A&M has enrolled the largest student body in the United States. It is classified among "R1: Doctoral Universities – Very high research activity" and since 2001 has been a member of the Association of American Universities.

The university was the first public higher education institution in Texas; it opened for classes on October 4, 1876, as the Agricultural and Mechanical College of Texas (A.M.C.) under the provisions of the 1862 Morrill Land-Grant Act. In the following decades, the college grew in size and scope, expanding to its largest enrollment during WWII before its first significant stagnation in enrollment post-war. Enrollment grew again in the 1960s under the leadership of President James Earl Rudder, during whose tenure the college desegregated, became coeducational, and ended the requirement for participation in the Corps of Cadets. In 1963, to reflect the institution's expanded roles and academic offerings, the Texas Legislature renamed the college Texas A&M University; the letters "A&M" were retained as a tribute to the university's former designation.

The university's main campus spans over 5,500 acres (22 km^{2}) and includes the George H. W. Bush Presidential Library and Museum. The university offers degrees in more than 130 courses of study through 18 colleges and houses 21 research institutes. As a senior military college, Texas A&M is one of six American universities classed as such and has a full-time, volunteer Cadet Corps whose members study alongside civilian undergraduate students. About one-fifth of the student body lives on campus. Texas A&M has more than 1,000 officially recognized student organizations. The university's students, alumni, and sports teams are known as Aggies. Its athletes compete in eighteen varsity sports as a member of the Southeastern Conference.

== See also ==
- Agriculture in California
- Agriculture in Florida
- Texan cuisine
- Prehistoric agriculture on the Great Plains
- Cattle drives in the United States
- King Ranch
- 1934–35 North American drought
- Texas Farm Bureau
- Farm-to-market road
