= Olive production in India =

Olive production in India is concentrated in the state of Rajasthan. Olives are not native to India. Olive production in the country began in 2007 when olive saplings were imported from Israel and planted in the Thar Desert. The first olive yield in India occurred in 2012, and commercial olive oil production began in September 2013. The first Indian-made olive oil brand called Raj Oil was launched on 9 November 2016. India produced 150 tonnes of olives in 2020.

== History ==
An Indian delegation led by Agriculture Minister Sharad Pawar visited Israel in May 2006 to attend the 16th International Agriculture Exhibition. Rajasthan Chief Minister Vasundhara Raje was also part of the delegation. During a visit to Nitzanei Sinai, Raje observed olives being grown in the Negev desert and felt that they could potentially be grown in Rajasthan's Thar Desert. After returning to Rajasthan, she met with the Indian Council for Agricultural Research but they rejected her proposal citing a previous failed attempt to grow olives in Himachal Pradesh in 1985. Despite the setback, the Government of Rajasthan decided to proceed with the project on its own. It incorporated Rajasthan Olive Cultivation Ltd (ROCL) on 19 April 2007, in which the Rajasthan State Agriculture Marketing Board (RSAMB), Pune-based horticulture company Plastro Plasson Industries (India) Limited (now Finolex Plasson Industries (India) Limited) and Israeli company Indolive Limited held equal stakes, to implement a pilot project to grow olives in Rajasthan. The Rajasthan government provided land and $3 million funding for the project, Finolex Plasson Industries supplied micro-irrigation solutions and equipment, while Indolive provided the expertise required for the project. The RSAMB and Finolex also invested ₹1.5 crore (US$170,000) each in the project.

Subsequently, 112,339 saplings from 7 olive varieties - Barnea, Arbequina, Cortina, Koroneiki, Picual, Frantoio and Picholine - were imported from Israel and planted across 182 hectares of land provided by the State Government. Eight olive farms were established in the districts of Jaipur, Jhunjhunu, Bikaner, Sri Ganganagar, Nagaur, Jalore and Alwar for the project. A nursery was established in Durgapura, near Jaipur to harden the rooted cuttings of the saplings before transplanting them in the farms. The saplings began flowering in 2011 and started yielding fruit by 2012. However, only 3 of the 7 varieties bore fruit resulting in a total production of just 10 tonnes. ROCL Chief Operations Officer Yogesh Verma described the pilot project as a success stating that lab tests had shown that the olives had an oil content ranging from 9-14% compared with an oil content of 12-16% in other olive producing countries, and that they would now focus on boosting yields. Gideon Peleg, Indolive's lead for the project, noted that conditions in Rajasthan were not similar to Israel as the former had extremely high temperatures, long monsoons and chilly winters. He also felt that previous attempts to grow the plant in Himachal Pradesh and in Jammu and Kashmir had failed due to a lack of expertise.

The Rajasthan government subsequently established a nursery at Bassi, Jaipur with a capacity to produce 1 million plants annually, and announced significant subsidies on olive saplings, fertilisers and drip irrigation systems to promote olive cultivation among farmers in the state.

Commercial olive oil production began in Rajasthan in September 2013. Over 144,000 olive trees had been planted on almost 260 hectares (640 acres) of public and private land in the state by 2013. Rajasthan produced 100-110 tonnes of olives in 2014. In the same year, an oil extracting machine was procured from Italy and an olive oil refinery was established in Bikaner. In August 2015, the Rajasthan announced plans to scale up olive production to cover 5,200 hectares in the state. The Government of Rajasthan launched India's first olive oil brand called Raj Oil at the Global Rajasthan Agri-tech Meet (GRAM) in Jaipur on 9 November 2016.

Rajasthan produced 150 tonnes of olives in 2020.
