= Sikitita =

Olive cultivar

Olive (Olea europaea)
- Origin: Spain
- Notable regions: Catalonia
- Use: Oil

The Sikitita or Chiquitita is an olive cultivar from Spain. It is a hybrid of Picual (female) and Arbequina (male) olives.
