= Masia el altet =

Masía el Altet is a family-owned estate that dates back to the 18th century. The building is catalogued by the Valencian Community as "Cultural Patrimony-Building".

The owner of the rustic farm, The Economist and Auditor Jorge Petit, developed an olive oil business, with a product carrying the same name, from his passion for the agriculture, the grove respects the tradition of farming from the existing centenary olive trees at the farm.

Originally, the olive oil was sold to Italy and given the exceptional quality obtained, he decided to bottle the so far acclaimed extra virgin olive oil. The acceptance was so great that Jorge Petit started to present his new product in many extra virgin olive oil competitions, becoming the most awarded EVOO in the world.

Chefs such as Soenil Bahadour, Marco Poldervaart, and Francois Geurts use Masía el Altet and internationally renowned Chef Joël Robuchon both uses the olive oil and is an ambassador for Masía el Altet brand.

Masía el Altet at night

== The farm ==
The farm is 30 km, as the crow flies, from the Mediterranean Sea. The microclimate brings cold winters and mild summers, and the extreme continental climate is tempered by the gentle weather patterns of the Mediterranean.

The olive-growing area of the rustic property Masía el Altet has approximately 70 hectares (170 acres), using drip irrigation systems. As regards to the soil management, no tillage is used in bare ground. The cultivation frame is 7×7 metres, with a total of 14,500 olive trees.

In the rustic property Masía el Altet the crop cultivation and maintenance are maximised in such a way that, through foliar analysis carried out on a regular basis, they try to achieve the optimal nutrients in the olives (both macro-and micro elements).

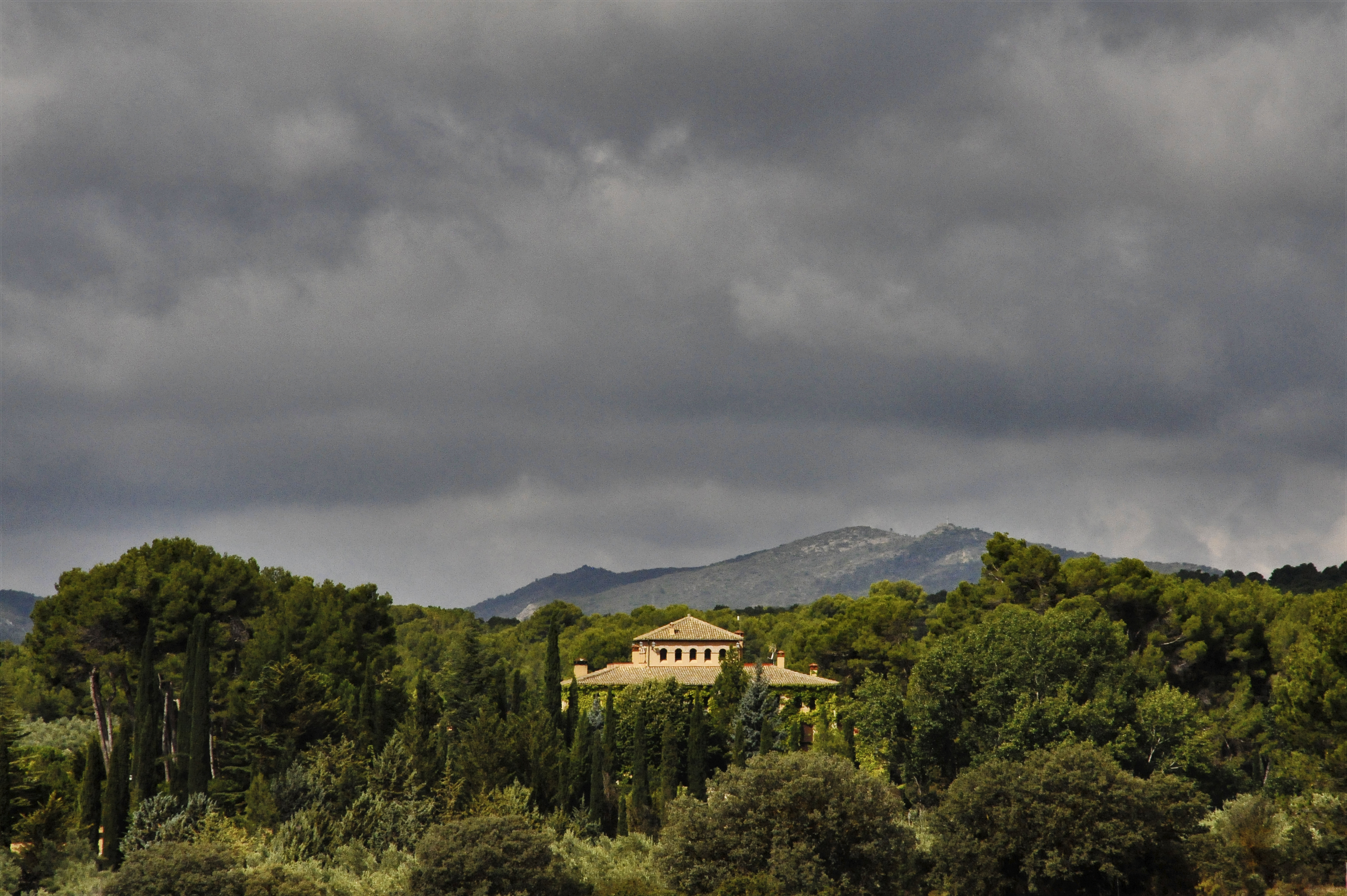
Masía el Altet and Sierra de Mariola Natural Reserve at background

== The olive grove ==
The varieties of olives are: Picual, Arbequina, Changlot Real, Genovesa, Blanqueta and Alfafarenca (the latter four varieties, native species).

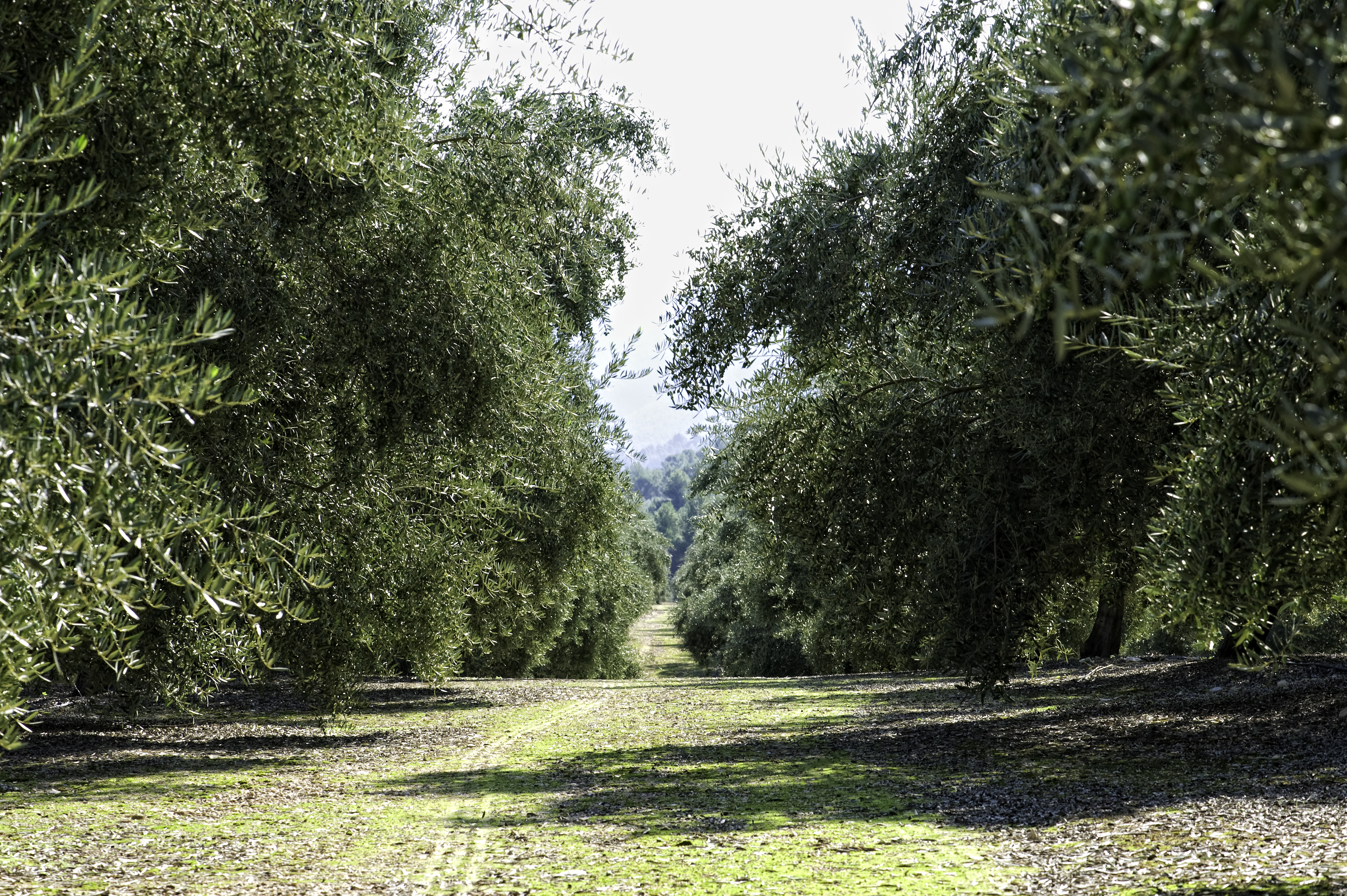
Olive grove "Picual"

== Surrounding ==
Half of the farm belongs to this natural reserve; Parque Natural del Carrascal de la Fuente Roja it is the best example of Mediterranean forest in Spain, it is easily found; Pine, Home oak, Kermes oak, Savin, Juniper, Ash, Maple, Gall oak, among others.

The other half belongs to Parque Natural de la Sierra de Mariola in the opinion of many well-known botanists, it is the mountain ridge with the most aromatic and medicinal plants in the world. More than 1200 species of higher plants have been catalogued, including many plants endemic to East Spain and the Alicante area.

The particular personality of the Masía el Altet Extra Virgin Olive Oil is largely determined by the fact so many of these aromatic and medicinal plants grow in and around the olive groves, giving the fruit its special, unique organoleptic properties.

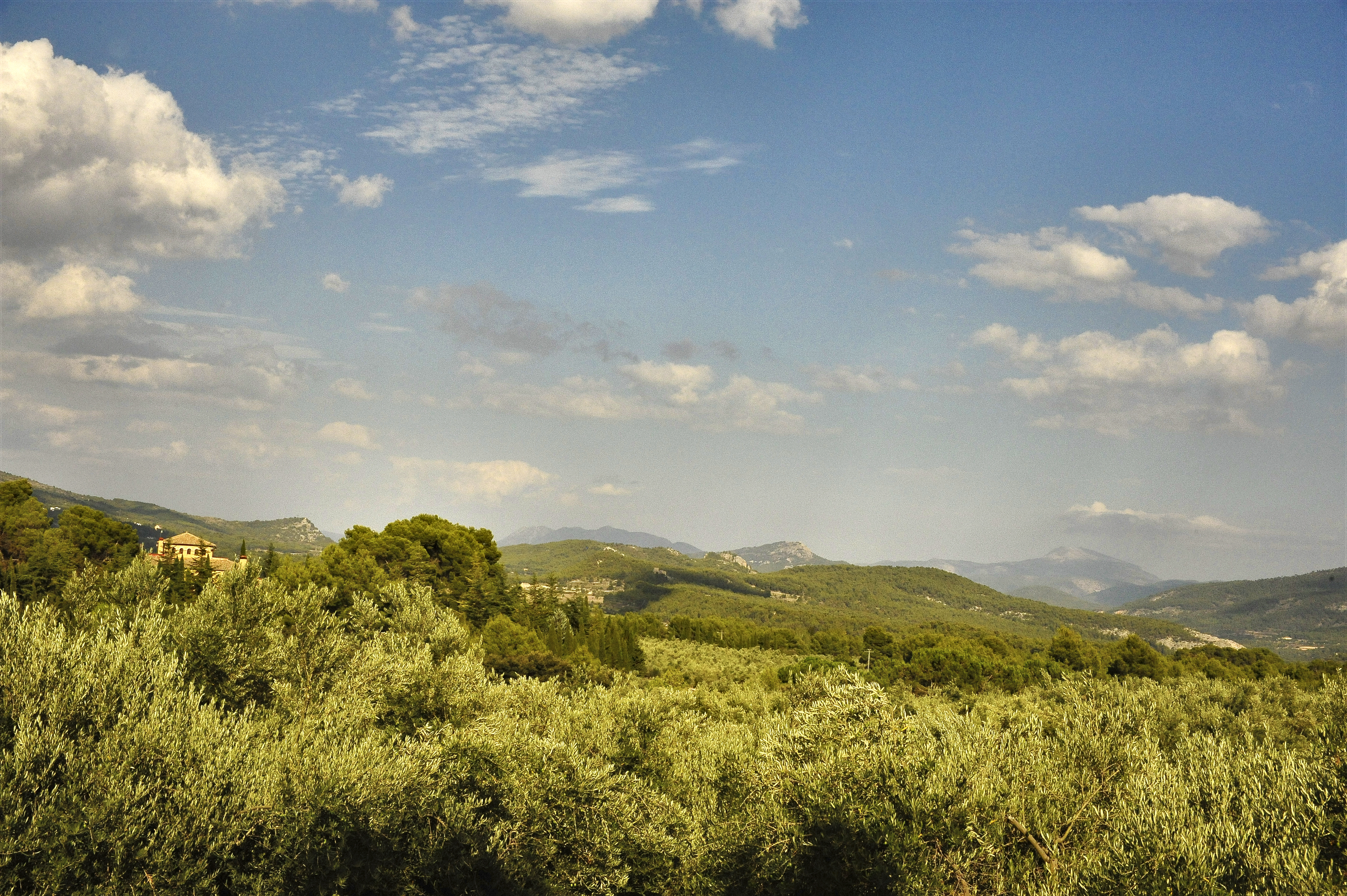
Masía el Altet, Sierra de Aitana. Sierra de Mariola y Font Roja

== The Harvest ==
The olive is harvested when it is at the “Pre-Veraison” level of ripeness (the moment when the olive is at its best in terms of aroma and taste) using machines that shake the trunk, with the olives falling into inverted “umbrellas”.

The harvest is carried out over a short period of time to obtain a product of uniform quality. This is followed by immediate and consecutive milling, as the harvest is taken in. The harvest is monitored at all times so that the fruit is in impeccable condition.

Fundamentally, the way to obtain an oil of “Extreme Quality” is to monitor the product throughout all the stages of the process, with constant attention.

== Masía el Altet's range ==
- Masía el Altet "High Quality" Coupage or blend: 60% Picual, 20% Arbequina, with the final 20% a mixture of Genovesa, Alfafarenca, and Blanqueta. The last three are local varieties.
- Masía el Altet "Premium" Coupage or blend: 30% Picual, 30% Changlot Real, with the final 40% a mixture of Genovesa, Alfafarenca, and Blanqueta. Changlot Real is also a local variety.
- Masía el Altet "Special Selection" 100% Changlot Real.
- Masía el Altet "High End" 100% Picual.

== Awards ==
From its creation Masía el Altet has won more than 300 Extra Virgin Olive Oil Competitions. Most important;

- 2007: Gold Trophy, EXPOLIVA. Jaén.
- 2008: First prize, (IOC) International Oil Council.
- 2009: Gold medal Los Angeles International Competition
- 2010: First prize, International Olive Oil Agency. Armonia Alma. Italy
- 2011: Best foodstuff Valencian Community.
- 2012: Best Mill in the World.
- 2013: The best of Class in the New York International Olive Oil Competition.
- 2014: Best producer and product "MASIA EL ALTET HIGH END" WORLD RANKING EXTRA VIRGIN OLIVE OILS.
- 2014: First prize, Olio Capitale. Italy
- 2014: First prize, Aipo D´argento. Italy
- 2014: First prize, Mastri Oleari ( Leone D´oro) Italy
- 2014: First prize, L´orciolo D´oro. Italy
- 2015: Gourmet D´or. AVPA. Paris France
