= Chania Kritis PGI =

Chania Kritis PGI is a Protected Geographical Indication extra virgin olive oil from Western Crete, Greece. It is defined by its specific regional origin, quality, and traditional production methods. Produced from Koroneiki and Tsounati olives, this extra virgin olive oil is characterized by its bright green-yellow color, fruity aroma, and balanced, bittersweet taste. The PGI applies to Chania prefecture, Crete (Kydonia, Kissamos, Selino, Sfakia, Apokoronas).
