= Oliana olive =

Olive cultivar

The Oliana olive is an olive cultivar from Spain. It originated from a hybridization between Arbequina and Arbosana obt. 1998 by Agromillora Group.

Overall evaluation

- A variety with less vigour for the Super High Density system.
- Natural benefit: ease of pruning renovation.
- High yield and exceptionally early production.
- Late ripening, between that of Arbequina and Arbosana.
- Tolerant to leaf spot disease and more suitable for low temperatures than Arbequina.

Overall oil profile Corresponds to a sweet type of virgin oil, well balanced and with good harmony at the aromatic level. Presents a medium to high level of fruitiness, light in bitterness and somewhat more intense in spiciness, making it highly suitable for the mass consumer market.
