= Galilee Green =

Israeli extra-virgin olive oil brand

Galilee Green is a brand of extra-virgin olive oil exported from Israel, made in the Lower Galilee region. The company is based in Yavne'el, and its olive groves are in Kibbutz Degania Alef. Their olive oil is made by cold pressing a blend of the Barnea, Coratina, and Koroneiki varieties of olive.
