= Oliete =

- municipality
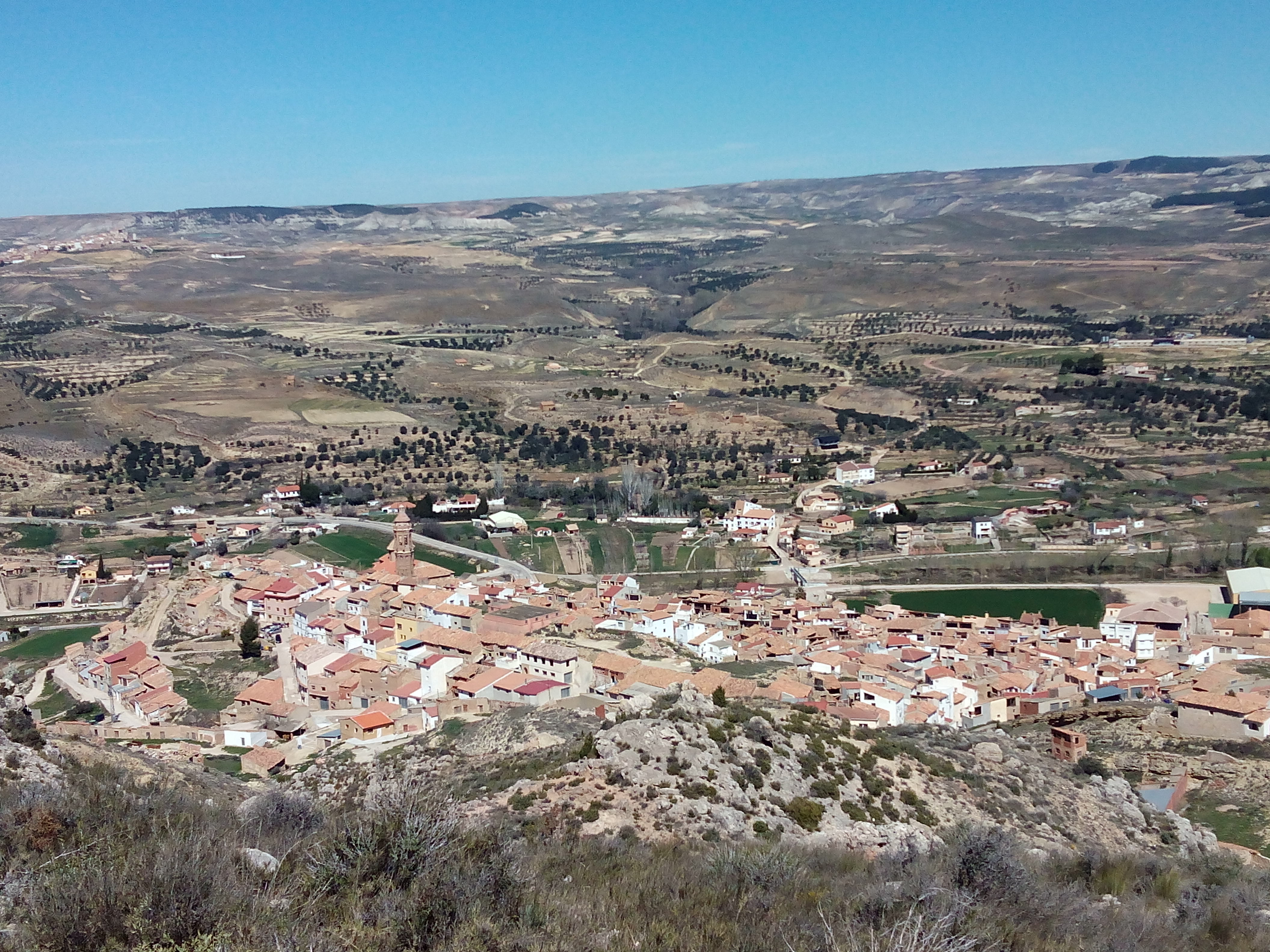

- Flag Coat of arms

- Location within Spain
- Coordinates: 40°59′N 0°40′W
- Country: Spain
- Autonomous community: Aragon
- Province: Teruel
- Municipality: Oliete

Government
  - Mayor: Rogelio Villanueva Lazaro (PAR)

Area
  - Total: 85 km^{2} (33 sq mi)

Population (2025-01-01)
  - Total: 351
  - Density: 4.1/km^{2} (11/sq mi)
- Time zone: UTC+1 (CET)
  - Summer (DST): UTC+2 (CEST)

Oliete is a municipality located in the province of Teruel, Aragon, Spain. According to the 2017 census (INE), the municipality has a population of 357 inhabitants.

== Attractions ==
The municipality boasts many attractions. These can be divided into:

Within the village:

- The Church of Ntra. Sra. De la Asunción (18th century): which highlights its Mudejar belfry.
- Donjuana house (17th century): This is a stately Renaissance building located on the church square.
- Hermitage of San Bartolomé: Located in the square of the same name, is the only chapel located within the town, and that honors its patron saint, Bartholomew the Apostol.
- The Arch of the Holy Martyrs: Located at the start of the Mayor street.
- The Arch of Santa Barbara: Located at the end of the homonymous street.
- The Arch of Pilar: Located at the end of the Baja street. Importantly, these three arches dating from the Middle Ages and were the three fortified entrances of the town.

Within the municipality:

- Reservoirs:
  - Cueva Foradada Swamp: This reservoir collects water from the River Martin. His dam, which was built between 1903 and 1927, has a capacity of 22 hm^{3}. On the banks of the swamp you can be found abundant wildlife like vultures, eagles and mountain goats.
  - Congosto Swamp: Collect the waters of the River Escuriza. It was built in the late nineteenth century.
- Hermitages:
  - Hermitage of the Virgin of the Cantal: The shrine was built around the year 1660, in honor of a statue of the Virgin holding the infant Jesus in her arms, which appeared in the place hidden in a hole under a cantal —in Aragonese, "rock"— that protected it, what its name.
  - Calvary Hermitage: Construction of a single nave, dates from 1680.
  - Hermitage of San Pedro de los Griegos.
- Prehistoric heritage:
  - El Frontón de la Tía Chula (paintings): This is a small set of schematic paintings, dated between times 'Copper Age' and 'Medium Bronze' (2500-1600 BC.). Furthermore, on the rock in which these paintings are located, there is a hole through which passes sunlight in spring and fall equinoxes, constituting the world's oldest sun shrine, about 4500 years old.
- Iberian villages:
  - El Palomar: The settlement, rectangular, is an exceptional and illustrative set of life forms of the Iberian populations in this region during the period between the centuries III BC. (when its construction date) and I BC. (destruction dates back to the year 79-72 BC. during sertorian wars).
  - El Cabezo de San Pedro de los Griegos: Noted for its two original towers, which are considered the oldest in Aragon.
- Natural heritage:
  - Sima de San Pedro de los Griegos: This cave, about 100 meters in diameter and 108 meters deep, is a unique chasm in Europe, both for its huge dimensions and biodiversity which houses background, with a lake approximately 25 meters deep.
  - Huerta (orchard): While years ago was characterized by its large size and productivity, is currently in recession and some neglect, promoted by the defendant suffered rural exodus during the second half of 20th century.
  - Olivar (olive grove): The municipality is abundant and variety Empeltre The village owes its name to this crop, as derived from the Latin olivetum ("olive grove"). Currently, 70% of the olive grove is abandoned. Oliete is part of the Designation of Origin Oil Aragon. The Apadrinaunolivo.org project tries to recover the 100,000 abandoned olive trees.
  - Chopera: Planted in the middle of the twentieth century, it occupies about a quarter of the garden of the town.

== See also ==
- List of municipalities in Teruel
