= Nocellara del Belice =

Olive cultivar

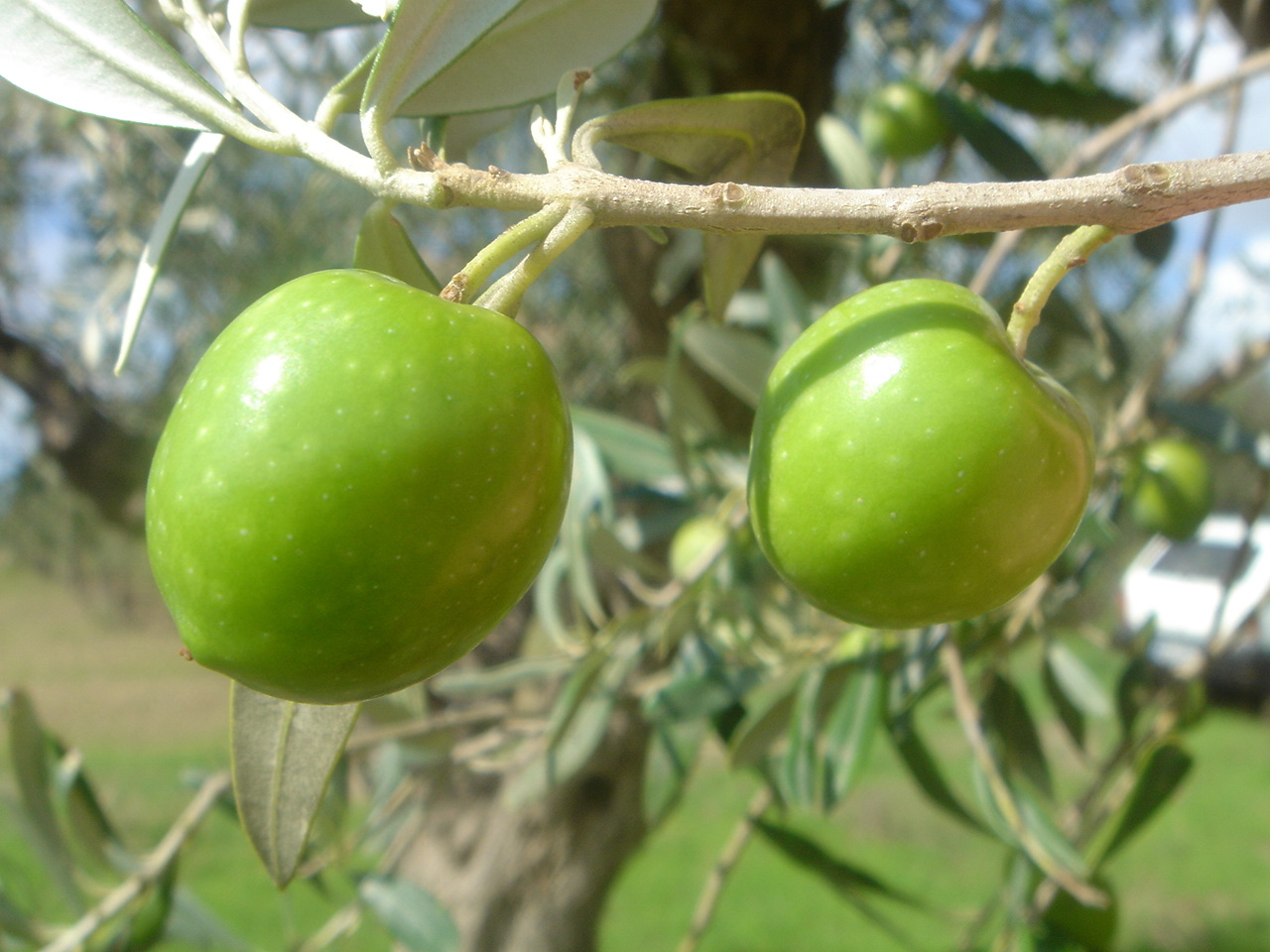

Olive (Olea europaea)
- Color of the ripe fruit: green
- Also called: Oliva Nocellara del Belice; Castelvetrano
- Origin: Italy
- Notable regions: Sicily
- Use: Oil and table

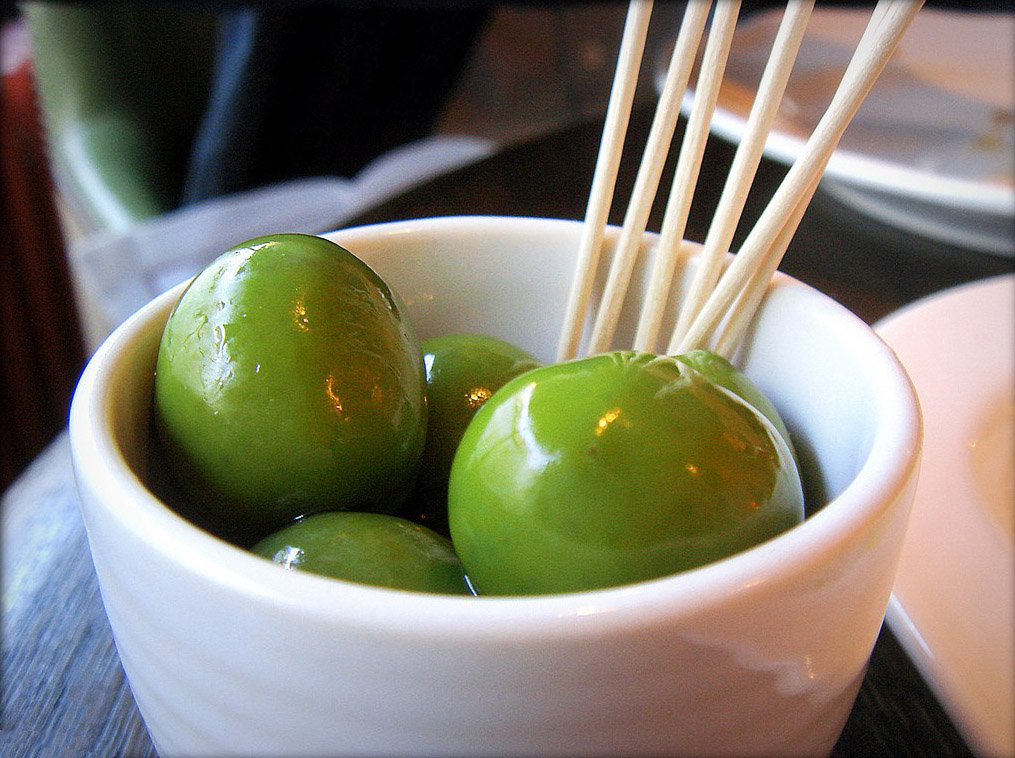
Nocellara del Belice table olives

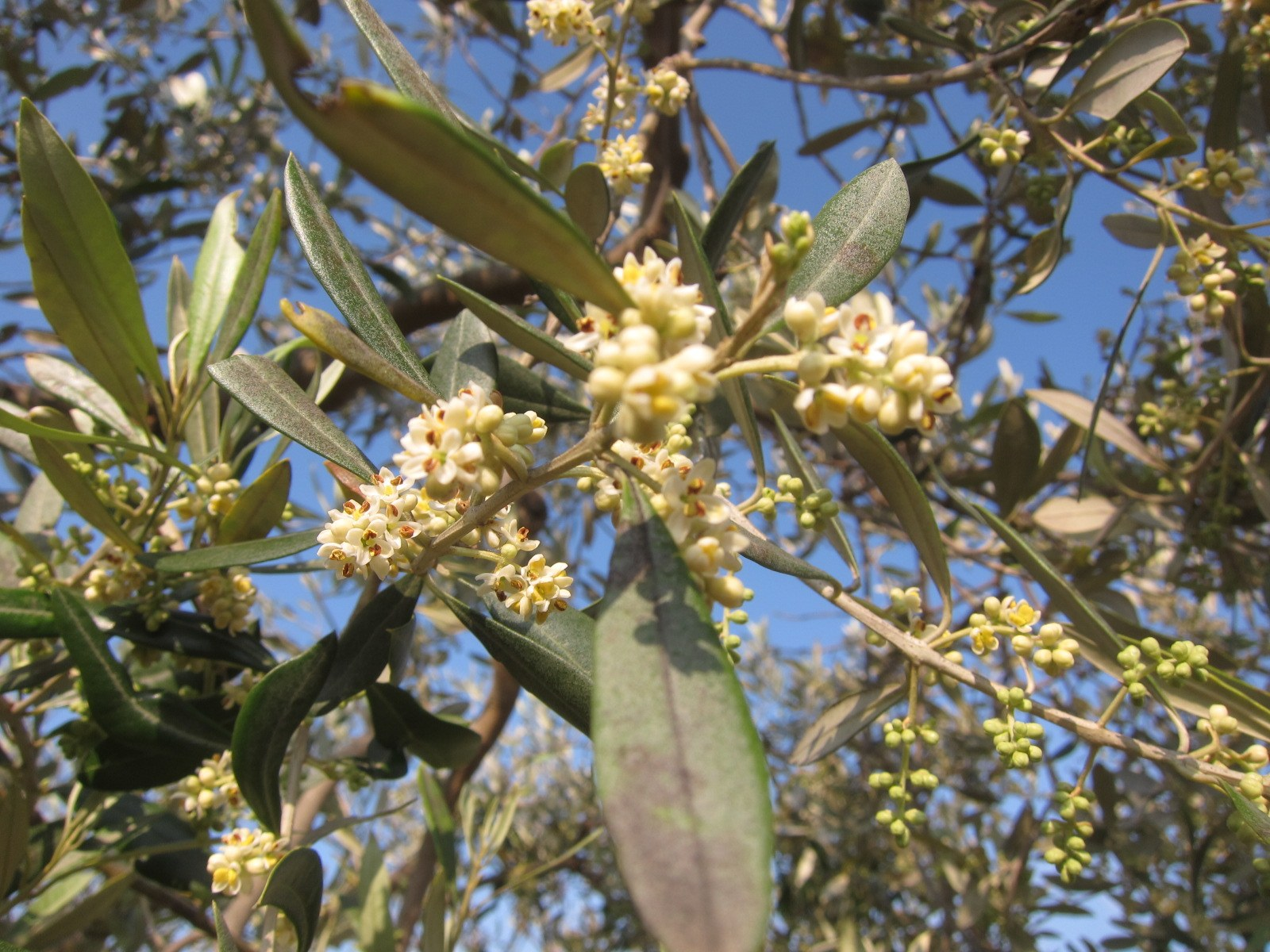
Nocellara del Belice olive in flower

Nocellara del Belice is an olive cultivar from the Valle del Belice area of south-western Sicily. It is a dual-purpose olive, grown both for oil and for the table. It is used to make "Valle del Belìce" extra-virgin olive oil, which is pressed from a minimum of 70% Nocellara del Belice olives. As a table olive it may be treated by various methods, one of which is named for the comune of Castelvetrano in the Valle del Belice; these may be marketed as Castelvetrano olives in the United States and elsewhere, and are large, green olives with a mild, buttery flavor.

The Nocellara del Belice olive has two DOP protections: both Valle del Belìce DOP olive oil and Nocellara del Belice DOP table olives have protected status in the European Union.

Nocellara del Belice olives are grown primarily in Sicily, but also in India, Pakistan and South Africa.
