= Germaine olive =

Olive cultivar

Germaine

Olive (Olea europaea)
- Color of the ripe fruit: Black
- Also called: Romana
- Origin: France
- Notable regions: Corsica
- Use: Oil and table
- Oil content: Low
- Growth form: Spreading
- Leaf: Elliptic
- Weight: Medium
- Shape: Ovoid
- Symmetry: Symmetrical

The Germaine, also Ghjermana (Corsican pronunciation: [ˈdjɛrˈmana]; Ghjermana di Balagna), Ghermana, Germana, and sometimes as Romana, is a cultivar of olives grown primarily in Corsica, but also in parts of northern Italy. Genetically it is close to the cultivar Frantoio, that is grown in the Italian region of Tuscany. The Germaine has a good yield of oil, and the plant is resistant to cold weather.

== Synonyms ==
The name of the olive is spelt in a number of different ways, including Ghjermana (or Ghjermana de Balagne), Ghermana and Germana. In some parts of Corsica and in Perugia, it is also referred to as Romana.

== Characteristics ==
It is a cultivar of middle strength, with a spreading growth form and elliptic leaves that are short and of medium width. The olives are of medium weight, their shape is ovoid and they are symmetrical. The stone has a rounded apex and base, with a smooth surface and the presence of a mucro. When fully mature, the colour of the fruit is black.

== Processing and agronomy ==
The Germaine is a dual use cultivar, that can be used both for extraction of oil, and as a table olive. Its yield of oil can be very high; more than 30%. It is considered a cultivar of good and constant production. The smell of the oil has been compared to pumpkin peel, while the taste is described as creamy, yet intense. The Germaine is valued for its good resistance to cold weather.
