= Leccino =

Olive cultivar

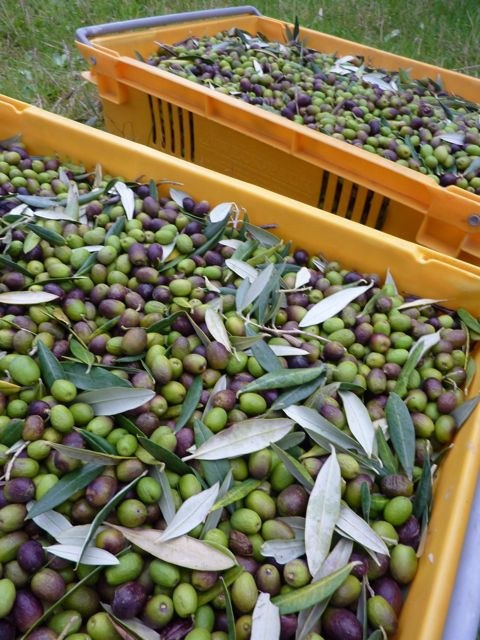
- Leccino olives just harvested

Olive (Olea europaea)
- Origin: Italy
- Use: Oil and table

The Leccino olive is one of the primary olive cultivars used in the production of Italian olive oil. Across Italy, it is one of the primary olive cultivars found in olive groves. It is believed to have originated in Tuscany, and it is now grown all over the world. Due to its delicate flavor, the olive oil it produces is commonly blended with Frantoio, Coratina, Moraiolo and Pendolino in order to create more flavor.

== About the tree ==
The Leccino tree grows well in cooler climates, but is not as tolerant to heat as Spanish olive cultivars. The tree grows quickly and has a dense canopy. It tends to be highly productive in the right conditions and has a tendency to grow more like a tree than a bush, which is different from most olive trees. Average oil yield is 18-21% of the fruit. It is not self-pollinating and requires the presence of another cultivar, commonly Pendolino, in order to fruit.

== Synonyms ==
Allorino (Leccino Pendulo), Allorino (Leccino Piangente), Grappuda, Prevoce Leccino, Colombina, Leccino LD (Leccino compact), Leccino LD (Leccino dwarf), Leccino 04, Leccino 13, Canneto Leccino (Leccino CLONE ISTEA 30), Leccino Collececco 22, Leccino di Belmonte, Leccino Ecotipo 2, Leccino Moricone, Leccino Pesciatino, Leccio, Lechino, Lucca, Toscano, and Verolana.

== History ==
While it is unclear when the cultivar first appeared, written references can be found near the end of the Middle Ages, and the Leccino is generally one of the older cultivars from Italy. Leccino has made its appearance in other countries over the past 50 years with the growing popularity of olive oil. It is commonly grown in California, Chile and Australia among other olive oil growing regions.
