= Verdale-de-l'Hérault (olive) =

Olive cultivar

Olive (Olea europaea)
- Color of the ripe fruit: Black
- Also called: Pourridale
- Origin: France
- Notable regions: Occitanie
- Hazards: Verticillium dahliae and Spilocaea oleaginea (peacock or Pan Eye Disease)
- Use: Oil and table
- Growth form: Spreading
- Leaf: Elliptic
- Weight: Medium
- Shape: Ovoid
- Symmetry: Asymmetrical

Verdale-de-l'Hérault is an olive cultivar developed in the department of Hérault, in the southern French region of Occitanie. The fruit produces a sweet oil with a light and fruity aroma of greenery, nuts, and apple, and exhibits no bitterness.

== Type ==
France recognizes cultivars of olive, as opposed to sixteen in other areas, excluding any variety or local names, and the Verdale-de-l'Hérault is included among the Verdale, Verdaou, and Pourridale.

== Characteristics ==
The Verdale-de-l'Hérault is slow growing with good frost resistance. The fruit is large and ovoid. The cultivar typically has a low yield of 10 kilograms (22 lb) of olives for 1 liter (0.22 imp gal; 0.26 U.S. gal) of oil.

The leaves of the Verdale-de-l'Hérault are short and narrow with a lanceolate shape. The fruit shape is slightly-asymmetric, spherical, rounded at the apex, and with a truncated base. The fruit produces a sweet oil with no bitterness with aromas of greenery, hazelnuts and apple.

== Concerns ==
Olive quick decline syndrome (OQDS) has been associated with the bacteria Xylella fastidiosa, was first reported in 2013, and has been observed in Italy as well as other countries. The bacteria subspecies multiplex was found in Corsica in July 2015. X. fastidiosa subsp. pauca has been detected in the Menton area.

Verdale-de-l'Hérault cultivar is susceptible to Verticillium dahliae and Spilocaea oleaginea (peacock or Pan Eye) disease

== Other uses ==
Verdale-de-l'Hérault is used as a pollinator for the Picholine.
