= Hojiblanca =

Olive cultivar

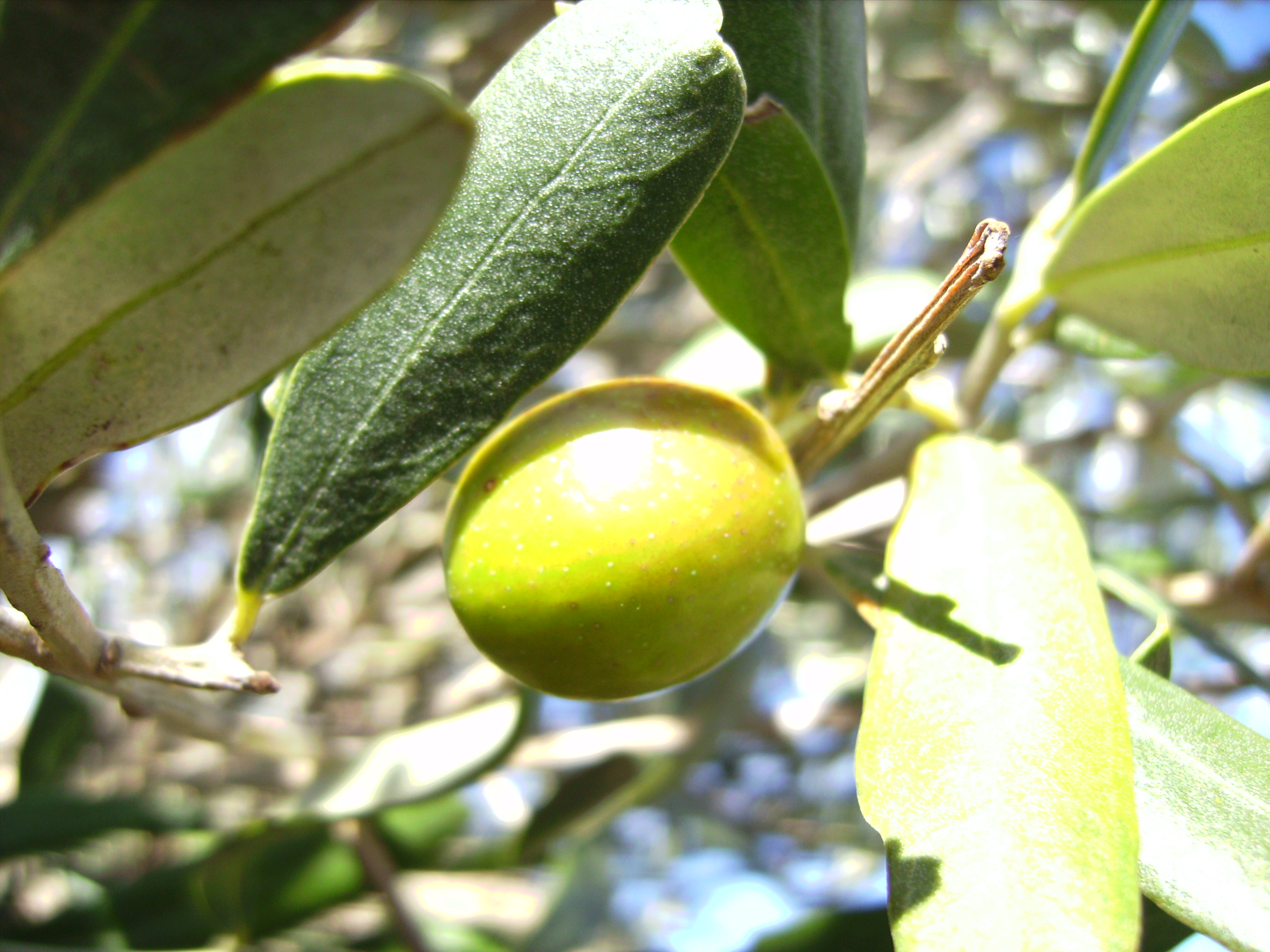
- Olive Hojiblanca, Castelltallat, Spain

Olive (Olea europaea)
- Origin: Spain
- Use: Table and oil

Hojiblanca (literally translated, "white leaf" in Spanish) is an olive cultivar from Lucena (Spain).

== Synonyms ==
Azufaijada, Barquillero, Casta de Cabra, Casta de Lucena, Foglia Bianca, Hojiblanca de Fruto Grueso, Hojiblanca de Lucena, Lucentino, Nevadillo Blanco de Osuna, Ojiblanca, Picudo, Zorzariega, Hojiblanca de Aracena.

== Description ==
Hojiblanca, one of 262 Spanish varieties, is a large fruit, up to 4.8 grams (0.17 oz), spherical in shape, a flesh to stone is 8:1, and an oil yield of 17-19%. The cultivar is endemic to Priego de Córdoba. Flavors attributed to the variety: Slightly sweet to start with a bitter taste of unripe fruits and an almond aftertaste.

== Production ==
It represents 16% of the olive production in Andalucia and is grown mainly in the Spanish provinces of eastern Seville, southern Cordoba and northern Málaga. In Andalucia it is collected in late autumn (November–December) as green or black ripe olives for eating, or late in the season (March–April) to produce oil. These olives are popular table olives, and are also used to produce oil, though the oil content is lower than some popular Spanish olive cultivars like the Picual.
