= Sabine olive =

Olive cultivar

Sabine
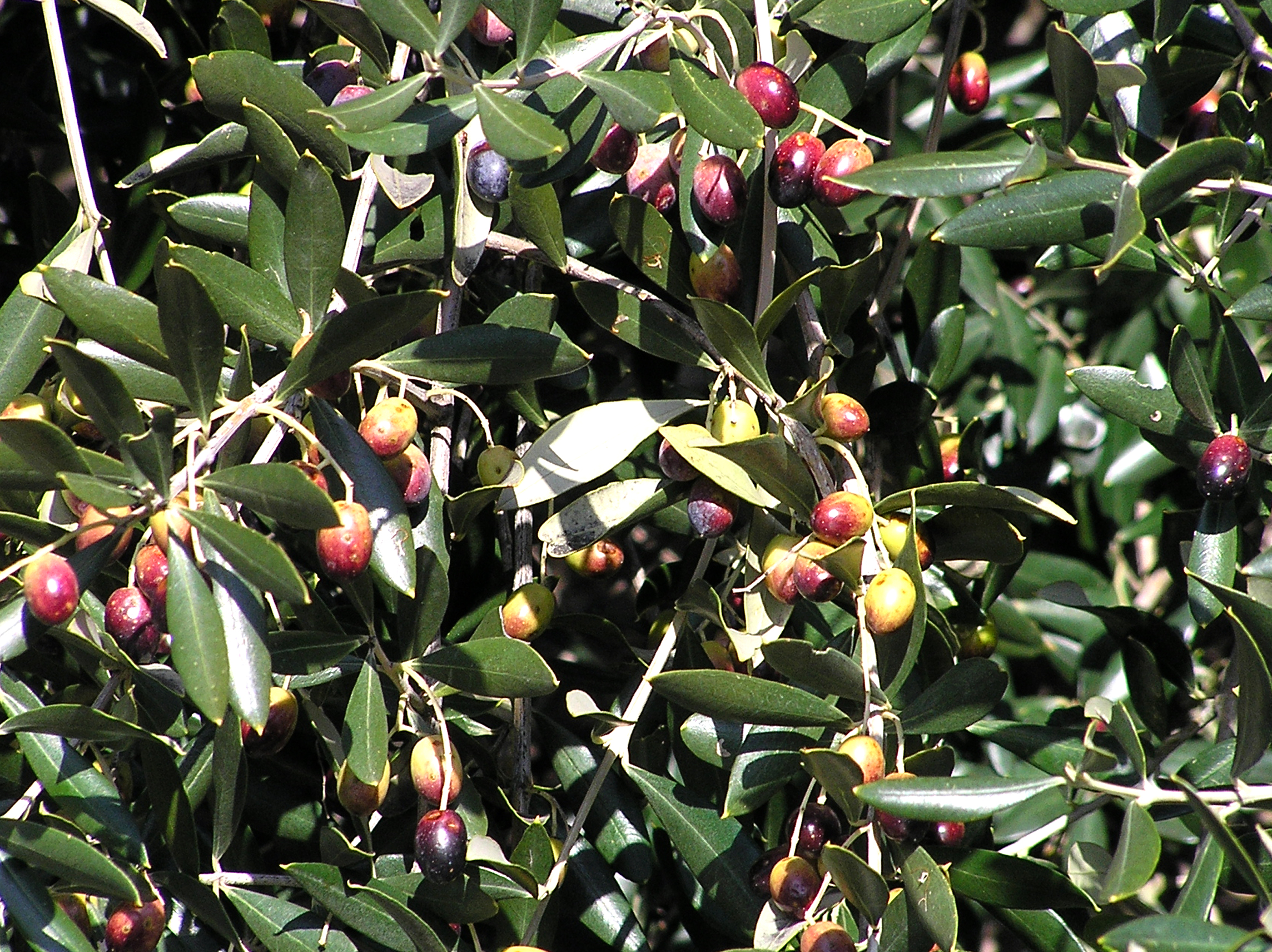

Olive (Olea europaea)
- Color of the ripe fruit: Black
- Also called: Aliva Bianca, Biancaghja, Capanacce
- Origin: Corsica
- Notable regions: Balagne in Haute-Corse
- Hazards: Saissetia oleae, Sooty moulds
- Use: Oil
- Oil content: High
- Growth form: Spreading
- Leaf: Elliptic
- Weight: Low
- Shape: Elongated
- Symmetry: Slightly asymmetrical

The Sabine is a cultivar of olives grown primarily in Corsica. In the Balagne region of Haute-Corse it is the main variety. The olive yields an exceptionally high amount of oil; more than 30%. Vulnerable to certain biological pests, it is relatively tolerant of cold. The Sabine olive variety should not be confused with the olive oil produced in the Sabina region of Italy.

== Extent and synonyms ==
The Sabine is primarily grown in the Balagne region of Haute-Corse, where it is the main variety. It is known under a number of different names locally, including Aliva Bianca, Biancaghja and Capanacce.

== Characteristics ==
It is a cultivar of middle strength, with a spreading growth form and elliptic leaves that are short and of medium width. The olives are of low weight, elongated shape and are slightly asymmetrical. The stone has a rounded apex and pointed base, with a smooth surface and the presence of a mucro. It is a late cultivar, and matures between January and mid-June.

== Processing ==
The Sabine is used mainly for extraction of oil, and gives an extraordinarily high yield; under ideal circumstances as much as 30%. The aroma of the oil is described as "ripe and green fruit and hints of nuttiness".

== Agronomy ==
It is considered a cultivar of good productivity, with good rooting ability, but with a tendency towards biennial bearing, i.e. that a good yield is followed by a weaker one the next year.

It has low resistance to certain biological pests, such as the Saissetia oleae and sooty moulds, and to a certain extent also the Bactrocera oleae (Olive fruit fly). On the other hand, it is quite tolerant of cold weather.
