= Meslalla =

Olive cultivar

Olive (Olea europaea)
- Color of the ripe fruit: Green
- Also called: Cracked green olive
- Origin: Morocco
- Use: Oil and pickling
- Oil content: High
- Fertility: Self-sterile
- Growth form: Spreading
- Leaf: Elliptic-lanceolate
- Weight: Medium
- Shape: Ovoid
- Symmetry: Slightly asymmetrical

Meslalla (cracked green olive,) is a Moroccan green olive cultivar used for olive oil production. It is often used to pickle garlic and hot peppers, and is also used in tagines.
