= Bosana =

Olive cultivar

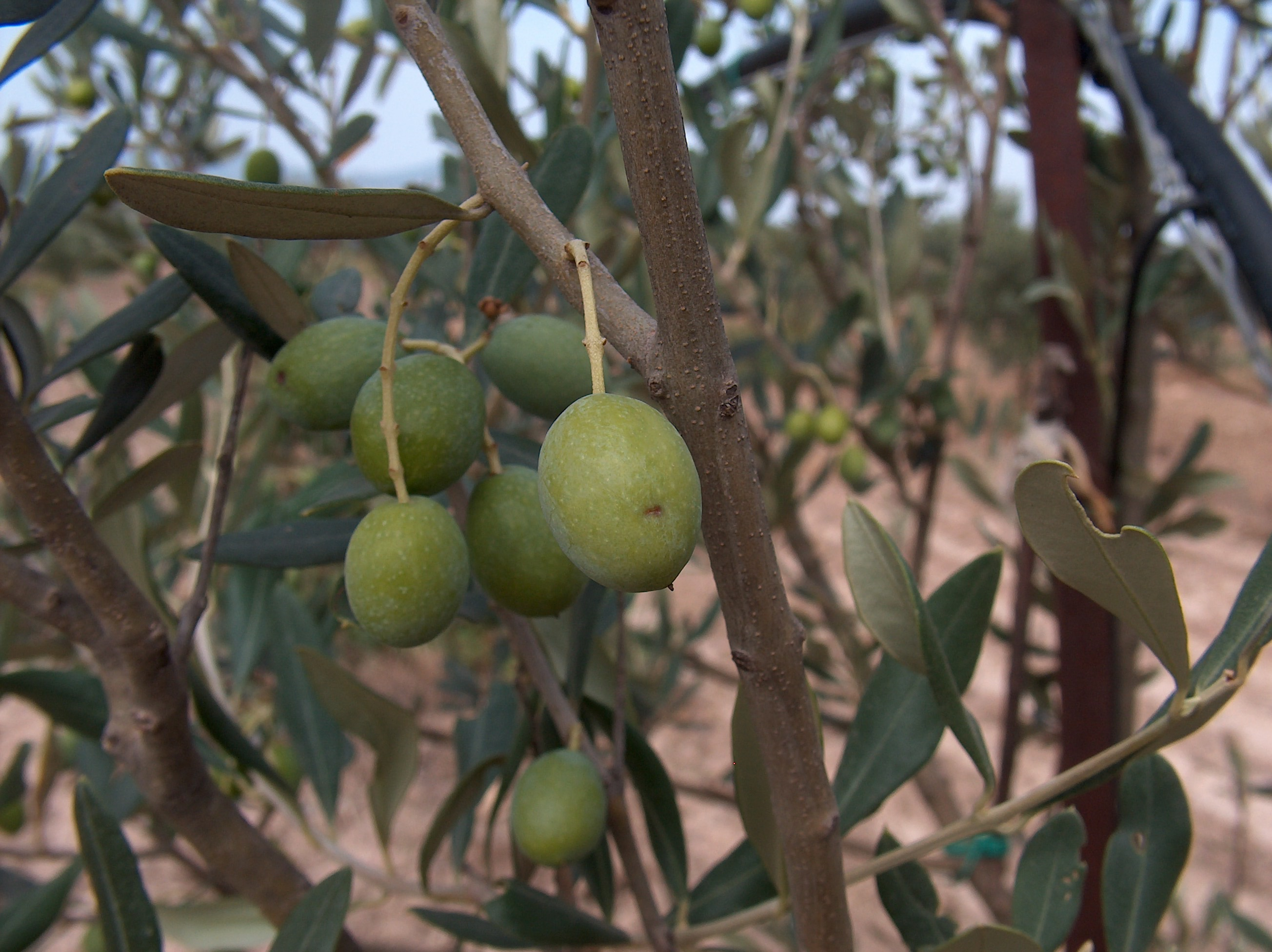
- Bosana olives

Olive (Olea europaea)
- Color of the ripe fruit: Black
- Also called: Olia di Ozzu, Palma
- Origin: Spain
- Notable regions: Sardinia
- Hazards: Peacock butterfly
- Use: Oil and table
- Oil content: High
- Fertility: Self-sterile
- Growth form: Spreading
- Leaf: Elliptic-lanceolate
- Weight: 2.5–3 g
- Shape: Slightly ovoid
- Symmetry: Symmetrical

The Bosana is the most common cultivar of olives in Sardinia. It makes up over 50% of the olive production on the island. The etymology of the name is uncertain, but it could refer to an alleged origin in the territory of Bosa. It is maintained, however, that the cultivar is of Spanish origin. It is used primarily for oil, but can also be eaten. The Bosana is a variety well adapted to less hospitable environments.

== Extent ==
The Bosana is particularly common in the olive-growing areas in the centre and north of Sardinia (Sassari, Nurra, Marghine, Planargia) and to a lesser degree also in central southern Sardinia, particularly in some districts of the province of Medio Campidano. This olive variety can also be found in Montenegro.

== Synonyms ==
It is generally accepted that other varieties of local extent are identical to the Bosana. Synonyms that are mentioned in the literature include: Palma, Aligaresa, Algherese, Tonda di Sassari, Sassarese, Olia de Ozzu, Olieddu, Sivigliana piccola and Bosinca. For the most part these are names identifying other varieties of limited range, that are local types of the Bosana.

== Characteristics ==
It is a cultivar of middle strength, with an expansive growth form, plain, elliptic-lanceolate leaves, an open crown, and average size. The olives are of middle weight (2.5–3 g), slightly egg shaped and quite symmetrical, with the greater diameter towards the top. The apex of the stone is rounded and smooth. The surface is covered in tiny lenticels.

The maturation process starts at the apex and advances from there. When mature, the colour of the fruit is black. It is a middle-to-late cultivar, in Medio Campidano it matures between November and December.

== Processing ==
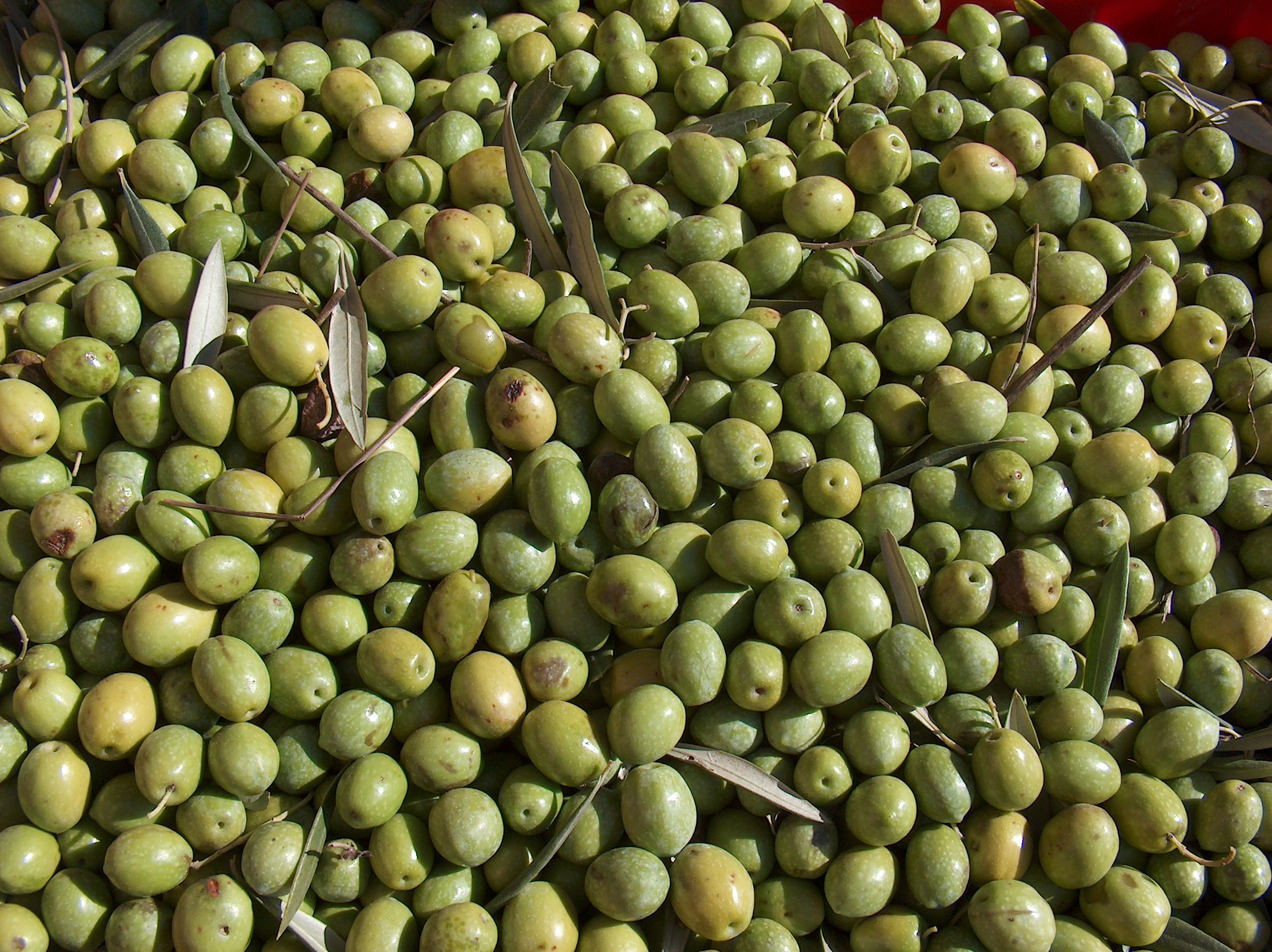
Bosana picked before full ripening

Traditionally considered a dual use cultivar, it is in reality mainly used for extraction of oil, and gives a good yield (17–18%). The quality of the oil is improved if the olives are collected early, at the start of the maturation. Its taste is described as "fruity, bitter and spicy".

The fruits of greater size are often transformed to table olives, whether green or black. They are considered to have the quality of not fading during the process.

== Agronomy ==
It is considered a very productive cultivar, well adapted to use in intensive growth olive groves, also under difficult conditions for growing and harvesting. It lends itself better to alternating use, but in intensive olive groves this can be amended with different forms of land management (manuring, irrigation and pruning).

It is generally agreed that the cultivar is self-sterile, so it can take advantage of a certain presence of pollinators. Among the olive cultivars used for pollination are the Nera di Gonnos (Tonda di Cagliari), Pizz'e carroga, Nera di Oliena (Nera di Villacidro or Paschixedda) and Cariasina.

It does not show and particular vulnerability to the major pests, with the exception of the peacock butterfly (Aglais io), this particularly in the dampest parts of north-central Sardinia. It has an average sensitivity to the olive fruit fly, and a high resistance to heat, moths and Pseudomonas savastanoi.
