= Empeltre =

Olive cultivar

Olive (Olea europaea)
- Color of the ripe fruit: Black
- Origin: Spain
- Use: Table and oil

Empeltre is a type of medium-sized, black olive originating in Spain. It is used both as a table olive and to produce a high-quality olive oil.

Empeltre olives are primarily grown in the Spanish regions of Aragon and the Balearic Islands. It is present along the Ebro river basin from the Rioja and Navarra to the province of Castellón and southern Catalonia, (where it is also called "Terra Alta" and "De la Llei"). There are 80,000 hectares of this variety in Spain. In the Americas there are plantations in Argentina (Mendoza and Córdoba).

== Distribution ==
The Empeltre cultivar is grown in the communities and regions of Huesca, Zaragoza, and Teruel, as well as La Rioja and Navarra and Castellón. It is the main variety in the Denomination of Origin Oil of the Bajo Aragón.

== Agronomic characteristics ==
The term empeltre is related to the Catalan word empelt or the Aragonese impelte, which means "graft". This is due to the fact that this type of olive tree has a very low rooting capacity, which forces the graft to be derived as a form of reproduction.

The olive trees of the Empeltre variety have a large wingspan as well as bright dark green leaves and early maturing black olives. They have a long form, asymmetrical and slightly pumped by the back. They have an average volume of 2.7 grams with a pulp / bone ratio of 5:3 and a yield of 18.3%. The empeltre variety provides a yellow-colored smooth oil that is sweet and aromatic with no bitterness.

== Synonyms ==
Aceite (De), also Castellana, Cornicabra, Lechin de Granada, Picual, Aragones, Aragonesa, Aragonesa de Tortosa, Comùn, Farga, Fina, Injerto, Llei, Macho, Mallorquina in the Mallorca area only, Navarro, Negra, Negral, Negral de Calatayud, Negral Fino, Negrala, Negreta, Salseña, Terra Alta, Tordero, Verdiel, and Zaragozana. Related: Callosina, Morisca, Cornezuelo de Jaén, Cornicabra de Baza, Cornicabra de Jerez de los Caballeros, and Cornicabra de Mérida.

== See also ==
- List of olive cultivars
