= Arbosana =

Cultivar of olives

Olive (Olea europaea)
- Origin: Spain
- Use: Oil

The Arbosana is an olive cultivar from Spain. Typically used for olive oil production, Arbosana thrives in super-high density growing systems. In 2009, a study by UC Davis found that 16% of super-high density olive groves (1,687 acres) in California were Arbosana, and that along with Arbequina and Koroneiki, Arbosana olives were among the most common in the state.

== Synonyms ==
K-18 in Al-Jouf and Arbosana Clone I – 43 in Argentina, Chile, France, Italy (Grosseto, Rome, Sicily, and Taranto), Portugal, Spain, South Africa, Tunisia and the United States.
