= Mission olive =

Olive cultivar

Mission

Olive (Olea europaea)
- Color of the ripe fruit: Green
- Also called: California Mission
- Origin: California
- Hazards: Cycloconium oleaginum fungus Pseudomonas savastanoi bacterium
- Use: Oil and table
- Oil content: 21.8%

The Mission olive is a cultivar of olive developed in California, by Spanish missions along El Camino Real in the late 18th century. The Mission olive has been included in the Ark of Taste, an international catalog of endangered heritage foods maintained by the Slow Food movement. It is also the only American olive cultivar listed by the International Olive Council in its World Catalogue of Olive Varieties. Although developed in the United States, Mission olives are also used by South African olive oil producers.

== Description ==
Mission trees can reach heights of 40 and 50 feet (12 and 15 m). They produce small fruit, typically of around 4.1 grams (0.14 oz). It has the lowest flesh-to-pit ratio (6.5:1) and greatest cold resistance of any commercial cultivar in California. Mission olives are harvested for table use from late October through November; for oil production, they are harvested between mid-December and February. They are susceptible to peacock spot, a disease caused by the fungus Cycloconium oleaginum, and olive knot, a disease caused by the bacterium Pseudomonas savastanoi.

== Uses ==
Mission olives are one of five cultivars (along with Ascolano, Barouni, Manzanilla, and Sevillana) commercially viable in California for production as table olives. They have also been used in the production of olive oil since the days of the Spanish missions.

== Prevalence ==
In 1992, the Mission cultivar represented just over eight percent of California's overall olive acreage. Mission olives were dominant until 1875, when Andalusian immigrants introduced the Manzanilla cultivar; subsequent introductions further reduced the percentage of Mission trees in California. After Manzanilla and Sevillana, however, it remains one of the more common cultivars in the state. The Oroville district in Butte County is a major Mission producer.

== Origin ==
Olive trees were first brought to California by the Franciscan mission of San Diego de Alcalá; olive production likely began in earnest within the first two decades of the mission. The original trees suffered after the secularization of the missions, though pioneers cultivated new trees from their cuttings, leading to the distinct Mission cultivar.

Though researchers at the University of Córdoba presumed the Mission olive to be of Spanish origin, they were unable to establish its relationship with any of 700 Spanish cultivars. Recent DNA testing in California suggests the Mission olive could be related to Picholine Marocaine, a Moroccan cultivar. Spanish settlers likely brought what would become the Mission trees to Mexico first.

== See also ==
- Mission fig
