= Winter Garden Region =

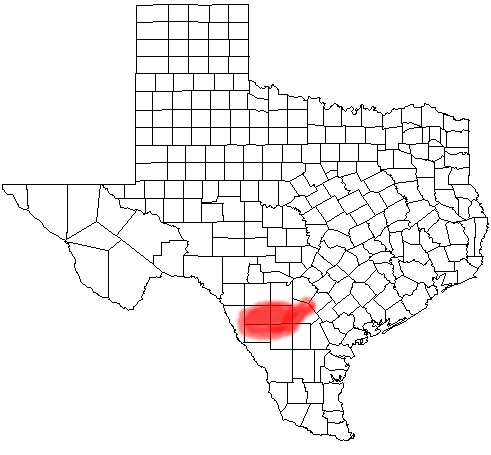
Map of Texas highlighting the Winter Garden Region

The Winter Garden Region is an agricultural area in South Texas (USA) located north of Laredo and southwest of San Antonio. The region is centered on four "core" counties - Dimmit, Frio, La Salle, and Zavala, but also includes parts of Atascosa, Maverick, and McMullen counties.

Bexar, Medina, Uvalde, and Wilson counties all have small or small portions that lie within the defined area, but they are typically not considered part of the Winter Garden region.

The region is noted for its year-round production of vegetables through irrigation.

== History ==
The area is part of the Tamaulipan mezquital ecoregion. Before the introduction of large-scale irrigation, the region was arid and covered in short grasses and mesquite trees. Onion crop production began near Cotulla (La Salle County) in 1896. At the same time, Dimmit County farmers began to use artesian aquifers and dams to provide water for irrigated crops.

The arrival of rail transportation in the early 1900s led to a major land boom in the region. Between 1900 and 1920, the number of farms in La Salle County almost tripled and the value of an acre of farmland in Dimmit County rose from $1.80 in 1900 to $24.60 in 1910 and more than $40 by 1920.

The number of farms in Zavala County tripled between 1900 and 1930 due largely to the division of the 96,000-acre (390 km^{2}) Cross S Ranch into 10-acre (40,000 m^{2}) plots. Although cotton production dominated in Frio County, the region's most important crops were onions, cabbage, spinach, beets, and strawberries. Other crops such as citrus fruits, melons, and nuts were also harvested.

By 1930, the Winter Garden region was home to 36,816 people (up from 8,401 in 1900). A combination of increased irrigation costs and the Great Depression led to a decrease in the number of small farms. Many were returned to ranchland while irrigation farming became a large-scale enterprise in other areas.

Corporate ownership of large farms became increasingly common after World War II, with major companies such as Del Monte establishing canneries close to the fields.

Today, the Winter Garden region is still among the leading producers of winter vegetables through irrigation in the country.

=== Core county population statistics ===
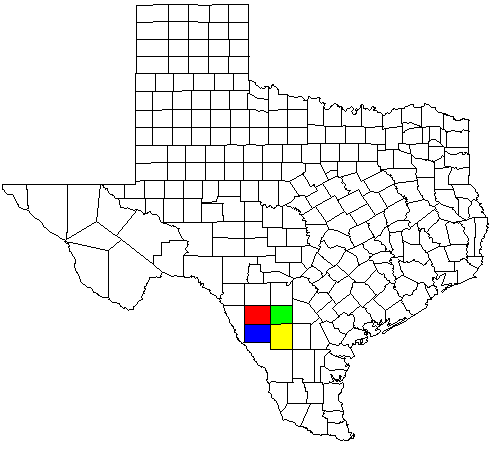
Core counties of the Winter Garden Region. Frio County Dimmit County Zavala County La Salle County

County	1900	1930	1950	2000	2006 est.
Dimmit	1,106	8,828	10,654	10,248	10,385
Frio	4,200	9,411	10,357	16,252	16,336
La Salle	2,303	8,228	7,485	5,866	5,969
Zavala	792	10,349	11,201	11,600	12,036
Total	8,401	36,816	39,697	43,966	44,726
