= Koroneiki =

Olive cultivar from Greece

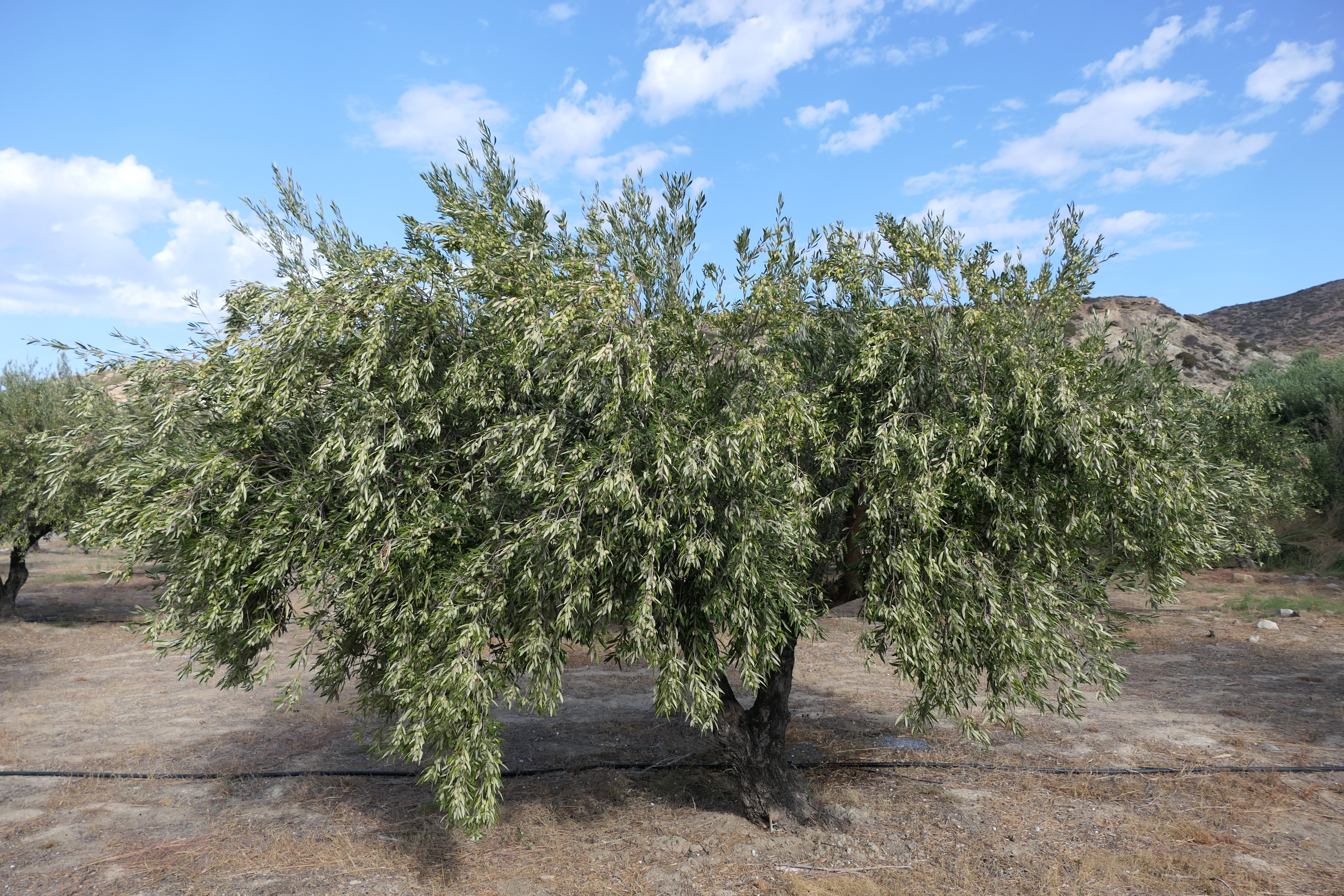
- Koroneiki Olive Tree. Sitia, Lasithi, Crete, Greece.

Olive (Olea europaea)
- Origin: Greece
- Use: Oil

The Koroneiki (Greek: Κορωνέικη) is an olive cultivar from Greece primarily used in olive oil production. After the Arbequina and Arbosana, Koroneiki olives are among the most common and suitable for high density growing systems around the world. The most common variety for oil production, Koroneiki olives cover 50-60% of the acreage in Greece. Koroneiki fruits are small, but have a high quality oil yield.

== Synonyms ==
Koroneiki is grown in Greece and also called Koroni in Kefallinía, Kríti, Pelopónnisos, Sámos, and Zante. Kritikia in Icaria, Kríti, some areas of Pelopónnisos, Sámos, and some areas of Zante. Ladolia in some areas of Kríti, Messini, Milos, Pátrai, and in some areas of Pelopónnisos, Sámos, and Zante. Lianolia in some areas of Kríti. Psilolia in some areas of Messíni, Mílos, Pátrai, and Pelopónnisos. Vaciki in some areas of Pelopónnisos, and Coroneiki in areas of Corsica, and Tunis.

== Cultivation areas ==
Koroneiki is grown in Greece, Albania, Australia, Brazil, Chile, China, Cyprus, Egypt, France, Israel, Italy, Mexico, Morocco, New Zealand, Portugal, Saudi Arabia, Spain, Tunisia, United States, and Uruguay.
