= Frantoio =

Olive cultivar

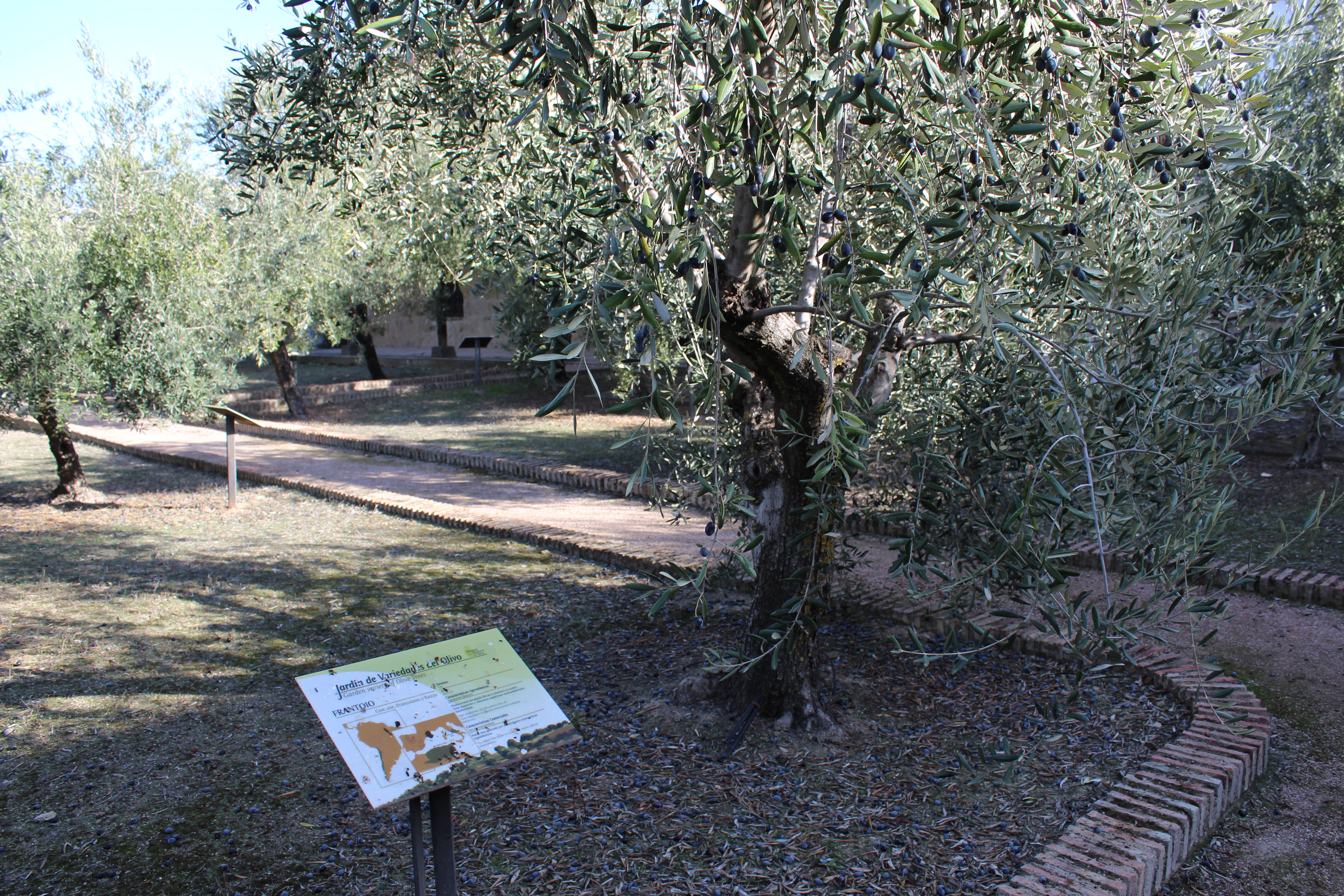
- Frantoio in Baeza, Spain.

Olive (Olea europaea)
- Origin: Italy
- Use: Oil

Frantoio and Leccino cultivars are the principal raw material for Italian olive oils from Tuscany. Frantoio is fruity, with a stronger aftertaste than Leccino.

== About the tree ==
The Frantoio tree grows well in milder climates, but is not as tolerant of heat and cold as Spanish olive cultivars. The tree grows moderately and has an airy canopy. It tends to be highly productive in the right conditions and has a tendency to grow more like a tree than a bush, which is different from most olive trees. Average oil yield is 23-28% of the fruit. It is self-pollinating and is excellent for pollinating other cultivars.Note that cross-pollination will increase yield.
