= Arbequina =

Cultivar of olives

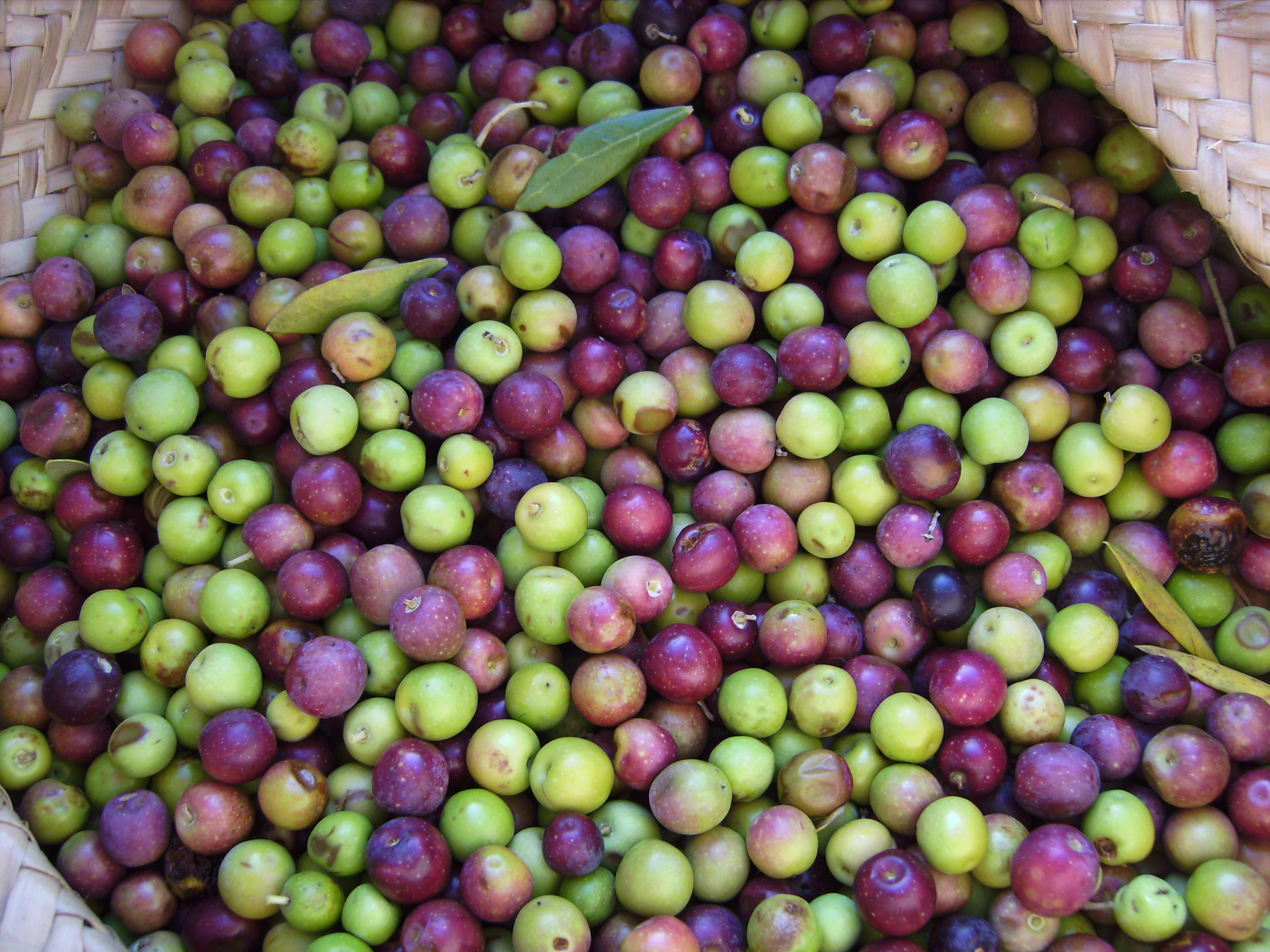
- Arbequina olives just after harvest

Olive (Olea europaea)
- Origin: Spain
- Use: Oil and table

Arbequina is a cultivar of olives. The fruit is highly aromatic, small, symmetrical and dark brown, with a rounded apex and a broad peduncular cavity. In Europe, it is mostly grown in Catalonia but is also grown in Aragon and Andalusia, as well as California, Argentina, Chile, Australia and Azerbaijan. It has recently become one of the dominant olive cultivars in the world, largely under highly intensive, "super high-density" plantation.

== Etymology ==
The name comes from the village of Arbeca in the Catalan comarca of Les Garrigues. It is said to have been introduced there from Palestine in the 18th century by the Duke of Medinaceli, though this might be just a legend. The Arbequina olives that are now grown in Israel were [re-]introduced from Spain.

== Countries of cultivation ==
Arbequina is grown in Albania, Algeria, Argentina, Australia (Areas of Adelaide, Buaraba, Loxton, New South Wales, Queensland, South Australia, and Western Australia), Bolivia, Brazil (Paraná), Chile (Areas of Arica, Huasco, and Limari), Egypt, France (Areas of Alpes-Maritimes and Hérault), Iran (Gilan), Israel, Libya, Mexico (Areas of Aguascalientes, Caborca, and Sonora), Montenegro, Morocco, Peru (Areas of Arequipa and Moquegua), Portugal, Saudi Arabia, Spain (Areas of Albacete, Andalucía, Aragón, Avila, Catalonia, Cuenca, Guadalajara, Madrid), South Africa (Western Cape), Turkey, the United States (Winter Garden Region, Texas), and Brazil (Uruguaiana).

=== Synonyms and areas ===
Arbequina is also known as: 21 kilo in Córdoba, Cuyo, and Mendoza, Alberchino in areas of Granada and Guadalajara, Arbequi in Lleida, Arbequin in Albacete, Almeria, Avila, Guadalajara, Huesca, Lleida, Logroño, Tarragona, Teruel and Mendoza in Argentina, Arbequina Catalana in some areas of Córdoba, Arlequin in Almería, Blanca in Huesca, Blanca De Espãna in some areas of Argentina, K 18 in Al-Jouf, Manglot (Del) in some areas of Albacete and Valencia.

== Agronomic characteristics ==
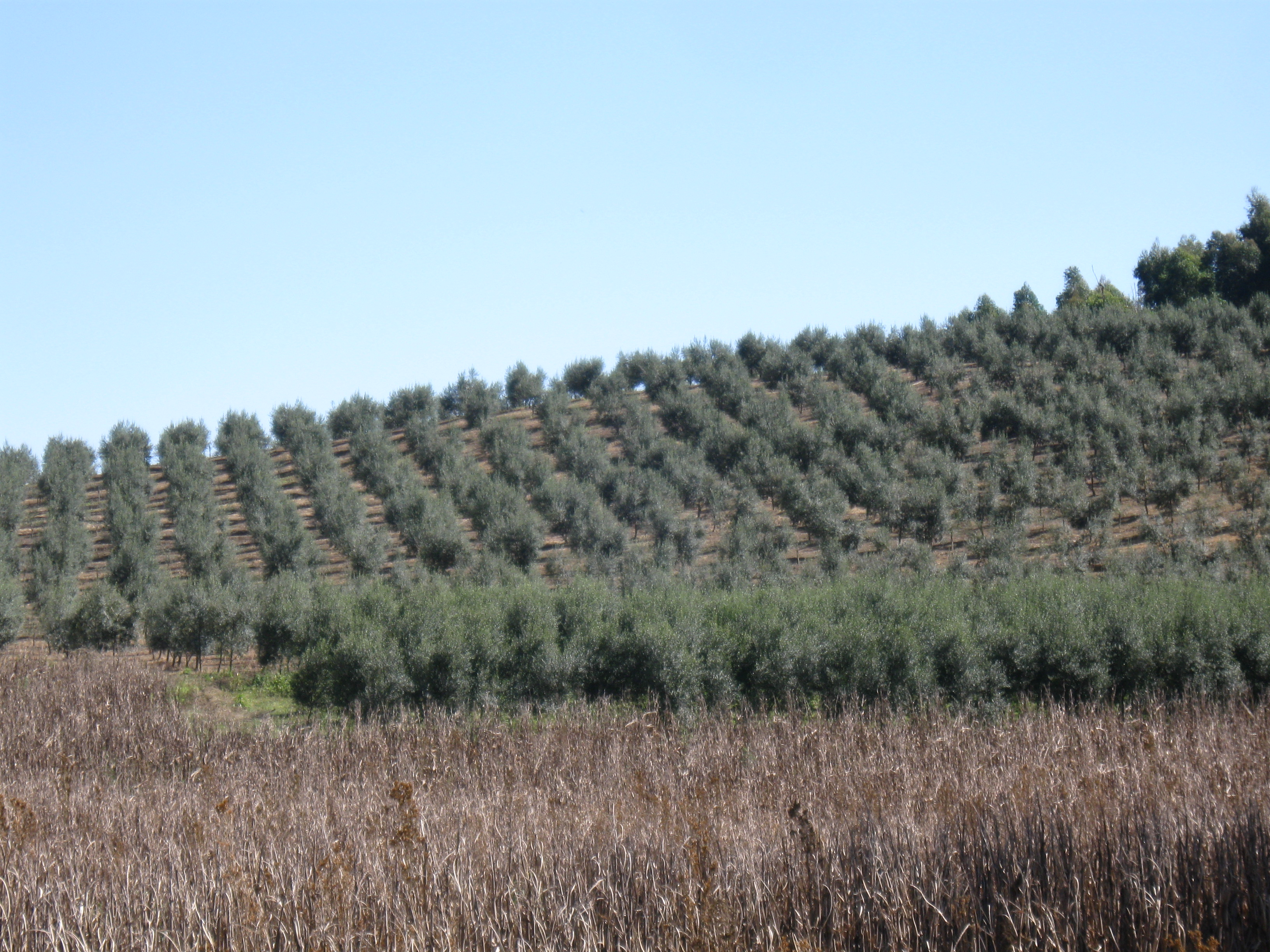
Arbequina olive trees on a plantation in Brazil.

Arbequina trees are adaptable to different conditions of climate and soil, although it does best in alkaline soils; it thrives in long, hot, dry summers, but is frost-hardy and pest-resistant. Its relatively small cup, allows it to be cultivated under more intense, high-density conditions than other plantation olives. The variety is very productive and enters early into production (from the first half of November). The fruit does not ripen simultaneously, and has an average resistance to detachment. Unlike most varieties, Arbequina has a high germination percentage, making it a common seedling tree for use as a rootstock. 78% of olive oil acres in California are planted on Arbequina rootstock.

== Gastronomy ==
Although sold as a table olive as well, Arbequina olives have one of the highest concentrations of oil, and are therefore mostly used for olive oil production. Harvesting is easy since the trees are typically low to the ground and allow for easy hand picking. Oils made from Arbequina are generally buttery, fruity, and very mild in flavor, being low in polyphenols. The combination of low polyphenol levels and high levels of polyunsaturated fat as compared with other olive cultivars means that it has relatively low stability and short shelf-life.

== Cross breeding ==
Hybridization using the Arbequina and Picual (Rallo et al 2008) resulted in the newer Chiquitita variety.

== See also ==
- List of olive cultivars
