= Picual =

Olive cultivar

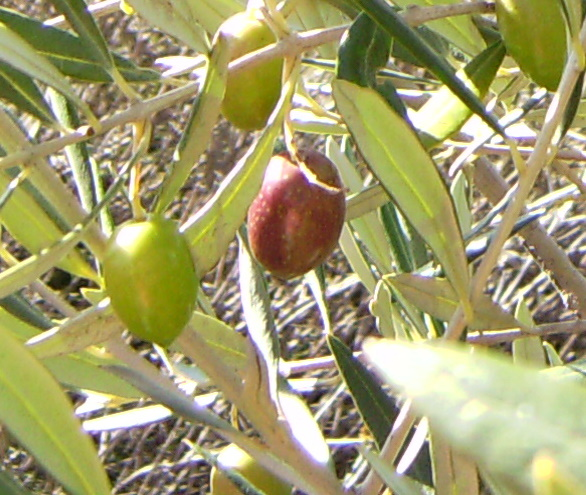
- Picual olives in Catalonia

Olive (Olea europaea)
- Origin: Spain
- Use: Oil and table

The Picual, also known as Marteña or Lopereña, is an olive cultivar from Spain. Picual olives are the most commonly grown olive today for olive oil production, with production centered in the Spanish province of Jaén. Picual trees are estimated to account for 25% of all olive oil production in the world. Naturally, this varietal is very high in oil content, at 20-27% by weight.

== Characteristics ==
Virgin olive oil from Picual olives has high levels of polyphenols (a class of organic compounds which are known to have antioxidant effects), typically between 300 and 700ppm. Many Picual groves are primarily harvested when ripe or overripe to maximize oil content, and thus produce oil with poor taste qualities. Less than one quarter of the harvest each year qualifies as Extra Virgin.

== Synonyms ==
- Albaideño
- Andaluza
- Blanca
- Carlon
- Corriente
- Doncel
- Fina
- Fino
- Grosal
- Jabata
- Javata
- Lopereño
- Marteño
- Marteño Basto
- Molejona
- Moradillo
- Moradillo Negro
- Moradillo Temprano
- Morcona
- Morenillo
- Nevadillo
- Nevadillo Blanco
- Nevadillo de Martos
- Nevado
- Nevado Blanco
- Nevado Blanco Productivo
- Olive Grosse de Tlemcen
- Olivo Macho de Santisteban del Puerto
- Picual de Aceite
- Picual de Almeria
- Picual de Calidad
- Picual de Estepa
- Picual de Hoja Clara
- Picual de Hoja Oscura
- Picual de Jaẽn
- Picúa
- Picuda
- Picudo
- Picudo de Martos
- Picudo Loporeño
- Picudo Marteño
- Picvalles
- Redondilla
- Salgar
- Salgares
- Sevillano
- Sir George Grey's Spanish
- Temprana
- Tetudilla
