= Olivière =

Olive cultivar

Olive (Olea europaea)
- Color of the ripe fruit: Black
- Also called: Pointue, Becaru, Ouana
- Origin: France
- Notable regions: Languedoc-Roussillon
- Hazards: Bactrocera oleae, Saissetia oleae, Soil moisture, Sooty moulds
- Use: Oil
- Oil content: Low
- Fertility: Self-sterile
- Growth form: Drooping
- Leaf: Elliptic
- Weight: High
- Shape: Ovoid
- Symmetry: Asymmetrical

The Olivière is a cultivar of olives grown primarily in the Pyrénées-Orientales region of southern France, where it is the most prevalent variety of olives. It is highly valued for its exceptionally high tolerance to cold. The Olivière is primarily used for oil, and even though the fruit yields a low percentage, the trees carry large quantities of olives, and the oil is of high quality.

== Extent ==
The Olivière is particularly common in the Pyrénées-Orientales, but also in Aude and Hérault. It can also be found in Italy, Algeria, and as far away as China.

== Synonyms ==
The Olivière is known under a number of different names locally. The local varieties in southern France include Bécaru, Galinenque, Laurine, Michelenque, Ouana, Palma, Pointue and Pounchude. In Italy it is referred to as Olivio Galliningo or Olivio Laureolo.

== Characteristics ==
It is a cultivar of very good strength, and can grow to great heights. It has a drooping growth form and elliptic leaves. The olives are of high weight, of a bulging, pointed shape, and asymmetrical. The stone has a pointed apex and a rounded base, with a rough surface and a mucro. It is an early cultivar, and matures in the month of October. When fully mature, the colour of the fruit is brown.

== Processing ==
The Olivière is used almost entirely for the extraction of oil, though it can also be eaten. It gives a relatively poor yield of oil (13–15 %), but it compensates for this with an extremely good yield of fruit. Trees start bearing fruit after only two or three years, and an adult tree can carry as much as 100 kg (220 lb) of fruit a year. The aroma of the oil is described as "fruit, almond and fresh apricots with a background hint of spicy green mint".

== Agronomy ==
The cultivar's vigour and productivity contribute to its popularity. It is a self-sterile cultivar, so it needs the presence of pollinators. Among the olive cultivars used for pollination are the Cayon, Picholine, Verdale and Arbequina.

A major drawback with this cultivar is its vulnerability to certain biological pests, such as the Bactrocera oleae, Pseudomonas syringae, Saissetia oleae, and Sooty moulds. On the other hand, it has an exceptional resistance to cold; after the devastatingly hard winter of 1956, when most French olive orchards were destroyed, many Olivière trees survived. That means that some of the trees of this variety are over 400 years old.
