= Lucques =

Olive cultivar

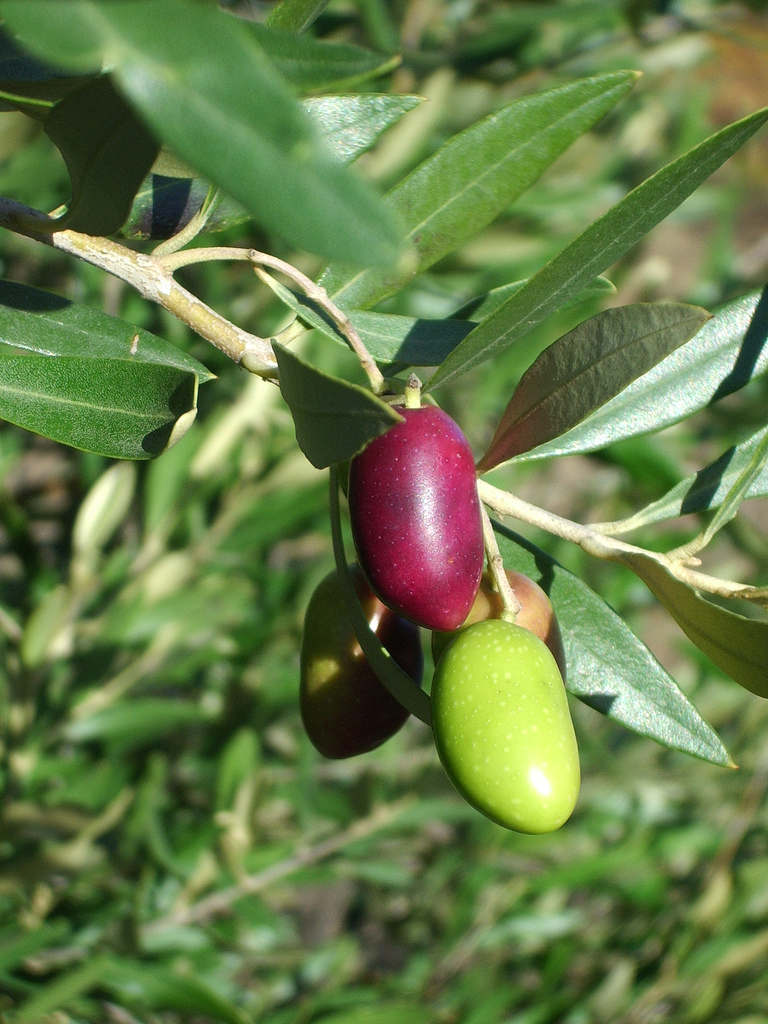
- Lucques olives ripening on the tree

Olive (Olea europaea)
- Color of the ripe fruit: Green
- Also called: Lucquoise, Olivier Odorant, Oliverolle
- Origin: France
- Notable regions: Languedoc
- Hazards: Olive fruit fly, sooty mold, Verticillium dahliae etc.
- Use: Oil and table
- Oil content: Medium
- Fertility: Self-sterile
- Growth form: Spreading
- Leaf: Elliptic-lanceolate
- Weight: Medium
- Shape: Elongated
- Symmetry: Asymmetrical

The Lucques is a cultivar of olives grown primarily in Languedoc in France. It is primarily used as a green table olive. It can also produce high quality oil, but this is hard to extract. Though vulnerable to certain pests, it is relatively resistant to cold and drought.

== Extent ==
The Lucques owes its French name to the tradition that it originated in the Italian province of Lucca (Lucques in French). Today it is primarily associated with southern France, particularly in the Languedoc-Roussillon region and the départements of Aude and Hérault, to which its cultivation is limited in Europe by a protected designation of origin (PDO, or AOP in French) since 2017. It can also be found in Northern Africa, Turkey, the United States and Australia.

== Synonyms ==
Locally, this cultivar is known under a number of different names, including Lucquoise or Luquoise, Oliva Lucchese, Oliverolle, Olivier de Lucques, Olivier Odorant and Plant du Languedoc.

== Characteristics ==
It is a cultivar of good strength, with a spreading growth form in a shape described as "a vase or a parasol". The leaves are elliptic-lanceolate, with a medium length and width. The olives are of medium to high weight. They have an elongated, asymmetrical shape, with a pointed apex and a truncated base. The stone is pointed at both ends, with few grooves and no mucro.

Though the fruit comes into bearing early, its ripening is late. Picking is at the end of October or beginning of November, while the skin is a light green. It matures in December, and when fully mature the colour of the fruit is dark purple.

== Processing ==
The Lucques is primarily used as a green table olive, and the fruit tastes meaty and sweet. Some compare it to fresh almonds and avocados. It is a highly valued olive among gourmets. It can also be used for oil, and the oil it produces is of excellent quality, but it is difficult to extract. It gives a medium oil yield. The smell of the oil has alternately been described as "almond", "green apple", and "tomato". The taste is sweet; to some, excessively so.

== Agronomy ==
It is considered a productive cultivar, but depends on good quality soil and regular irrigation to give a high yield. The cultivar is self-sterile, so it depends on other pollinators. It is vulnerable to certain pests, including the olive fruit fly, sooty mold and Verticillium dahliae. On the other hand, it has a moderately good tolerance to cold and drought, although the tree suffered terribly in the cold winter of early 1956 when millions of trees were cut down all over the Midi.

== See also ==
- Picholine (Fausse Lucques)
