= Salade niçoise =

French salad with anchovies or tuna

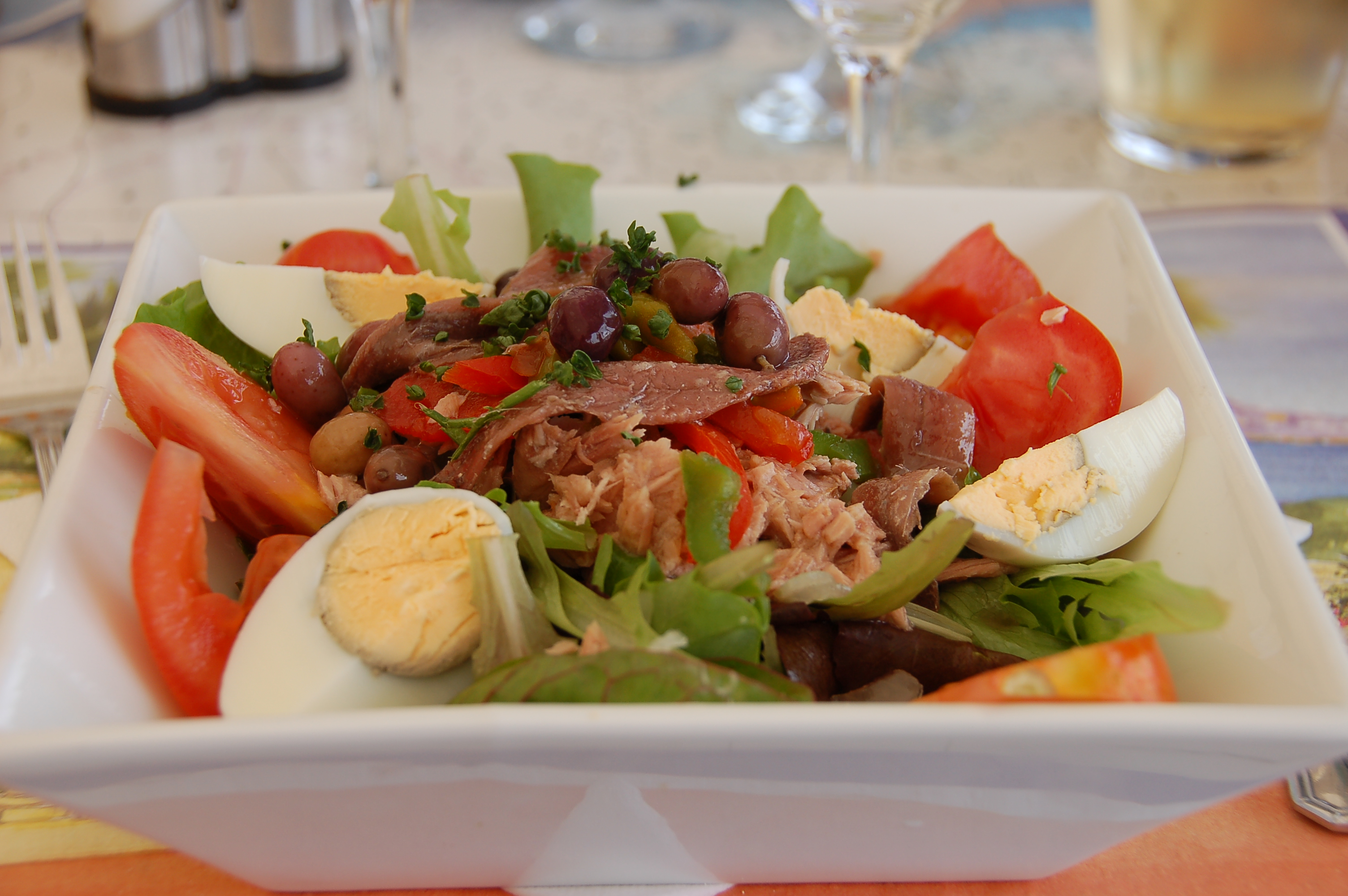
- Traditional version served at a French Riviera restaurant
- Type: Salad
- Place of origin: France
- Region or state: Nice
- Main ingredients: Tomatoes, tuna or anchovies, Niçoise olives, egg

Salade niçoise (French pronunciation: [salad niswaz]; Occitan: salada niçarda, pronounced [saˈlaðo niˈsaɾðo], or salada nissarda in the Niçard dialect) is a salad that originated in the French city of Nice. It is traditionally made of tomatoes, hard-boiled eggs, Niçoise olives and anchovies or tuna, dressed with olive oil or, in some historical versions, a vinaigrette. It has been popular worldwide since the early 20th century, and has been prepared and discussed by many chefs. Delia Smith called it "one of the best combinations of salad ingredients ever invented" and Gordon Ramsay said that "it must be the finest summer salad of all".

Salade niçoise can be served either as a composed salad or as a tossed salad. Freshly cooked or canned tuna may be added. For decades, traditionalists and innovators have disagreed over which ingredients should be included; traditionalists exclude cooked vegetables. The salad may include raw red peppers, shallots, artichoke hearts and other seasonal raw vegetables. Raw green beans harvested in the spring, when they are still young and crisp, may be included. However, cooked green beans and potatoes are commonly served in variations of salade niçoise that are popular around the world.

== Traditional recipe and its defenders ==
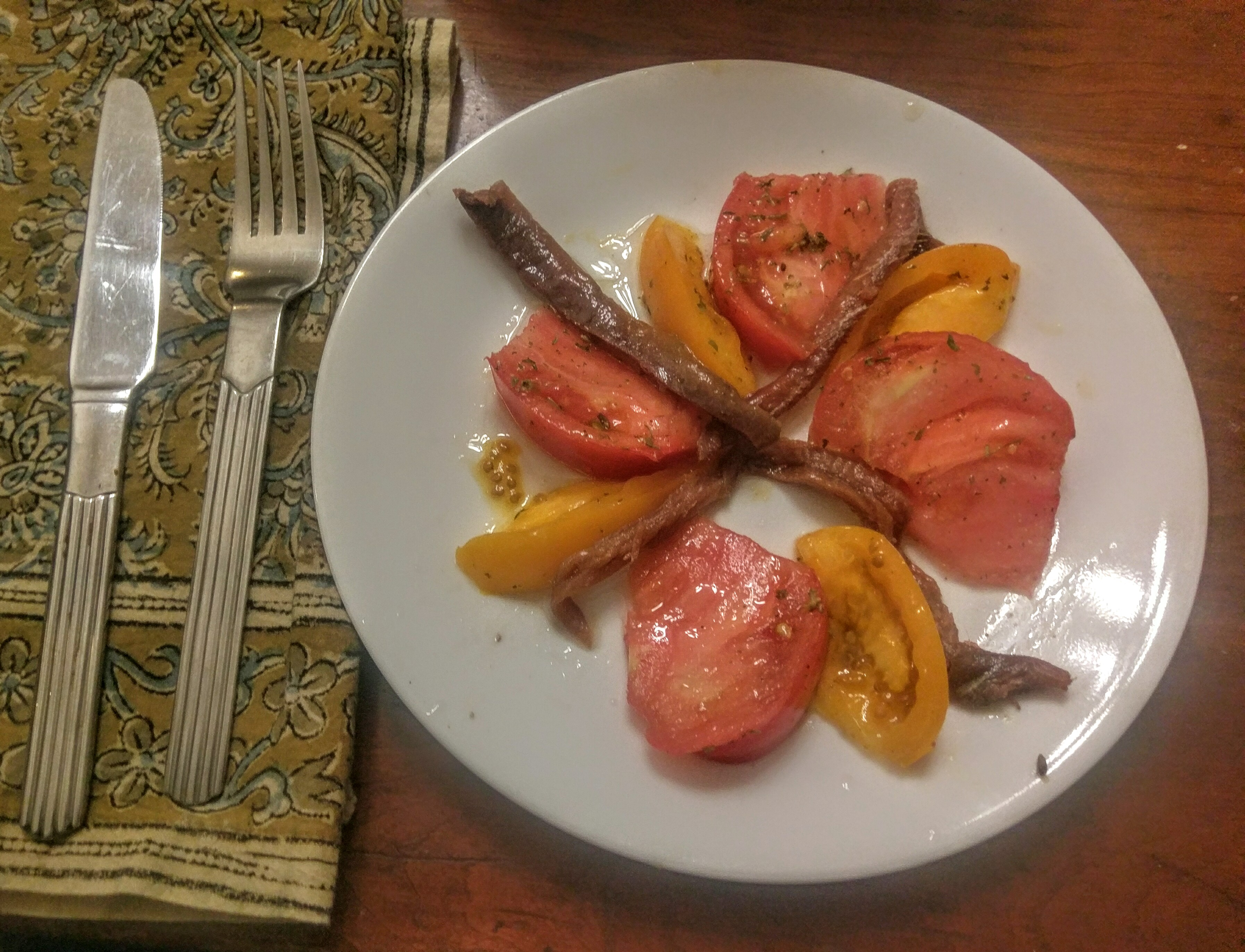
A simple salade niçoise in the 19th-century style, made of tomatoes, anchovies and olive oil

The version known in Nice in the late 19th century was a basic combination of tomatoes, anchovies and olive oil, described as "simple food for poor people". Over time, other fresh and mostly raw ingredients were added to the salad as served in Nice. A 1903 recipe by Henri Heyraud in a book called La Cuisine à Nice included tomatoes, anchovies, artichokes, olive oil, red peppers and black olives, but excluded tuna and lettuce. The dressing included olive oil, vinegar, mustard and fines herbes.

Former Nice mayor and cookbook author Jacques Médecin was a strict salad traditionalist. His 1972 cookbook Cuisine Nicoise: Recipes from a Mediterranean Kitchen called for the salad to be served in a wooden bowl rubbed with garlic, and excluded boiled vegetables: "never, never, I beg you, include boiled potato or any other boiled vegetable in your salade niçoise." Médecin wrote that the salad should be made "predominantly of tomatoes" which should be "salted three times and moistened with olive oil". Hard-boiled eggs were added, and either anchovies or canned tuna, but not both. He incorporated raw vegetables such as cucumbers, purple artichokes, green peppers, fava beans, spring onions, black olives, basil and garlic, but no lettuce or vinegar. According to Rowley Leigh, Médecin believed that salade niçoise "was a product of the sun and had to be vibrant with the crisp, sweet flavours of the vegetables of the Midi." Médecin advocated presenting the dish as a composed salad, commenting, "As the various ingredients that go into salade niçoise are of bright and contrasting colours, they can be arranged most decoratively in the salad bowl."

An organization called Cercle de la Capelina d'Or, led for many years by Renée Graglia until her death in 2013, continues to protest against deviation from traditional local recipes. The group, which certifies restaurants in Nice, sticks with Médecin's standards. They reject commonly included ingredients such as green beans and potatoes, as well as innovations such as including sweet corn, mayonnaise, shallots and lemon.

In 2016, French Michelin-starred chef Hélène Darroze posted a salade niçoise recipe on Facebook that included cooked potatoes and green beans. According to journalist Mathilde Frénois, the reaction on Facebook was quick and hostile from the "purists". Darroze's version was called "a massacre of the recipe", a "sacrilege", and a violation of the "ancestral traditions" of the salad. She was warned that it is "dangerous to innovate".

== Variations ==
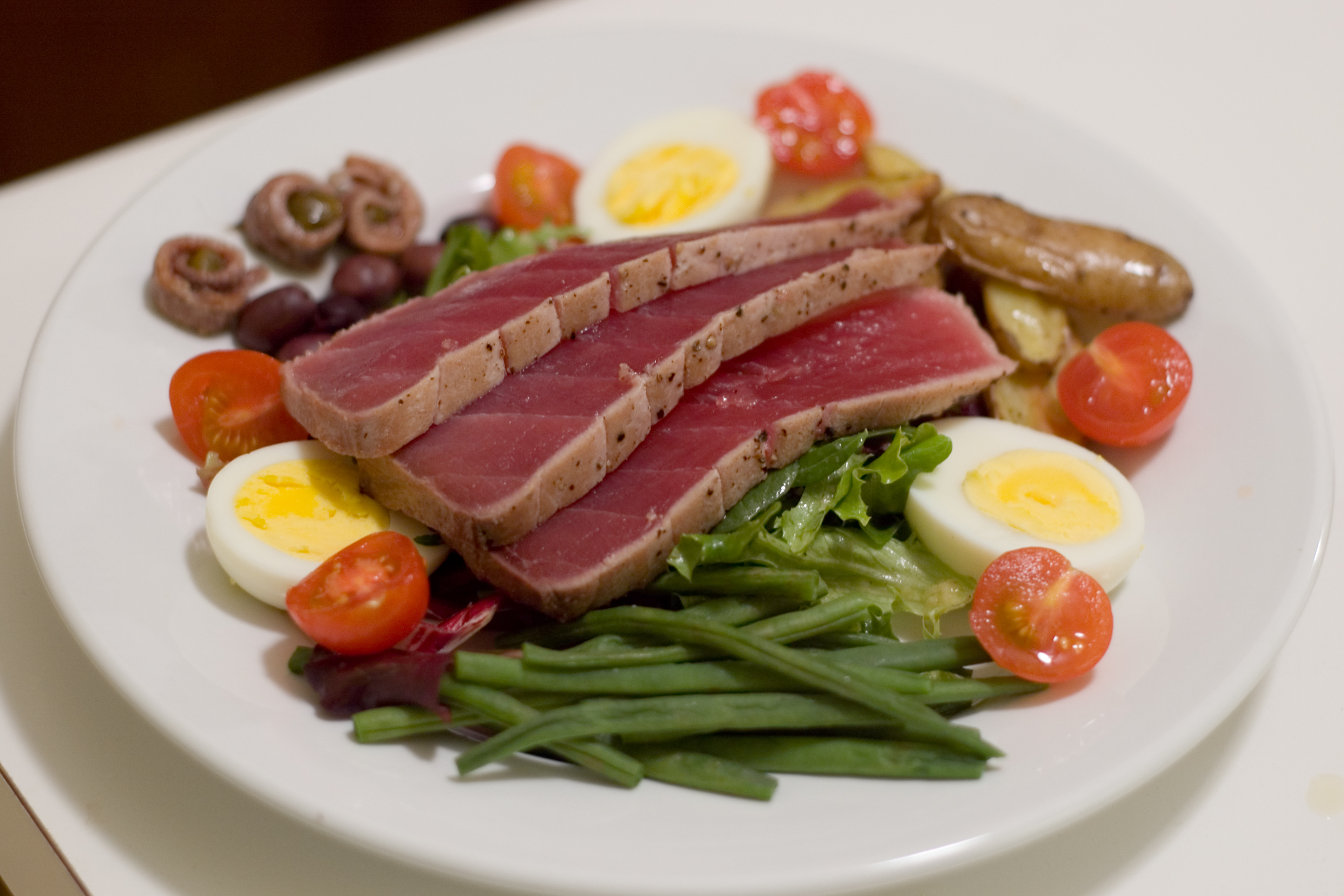
A non-traditional salade niçoise incorporating cooked potatoes and green beans, topped with seared tuna and garnished with anchovies

The question of the proper ingredients appropriate for a salade niçoise has long been the subject of debate and even controversy. The British cook Nigella Lawson observed, "Everyone seems to have a very strong opinion as to what should or should not go into a Salade Niçoise". Chef and cookbook author Auguste Escoffier (1846–1935), born in Villeneuve-Loubet near Nice, added potatoes and green beans, an innovation that remains controversial as a "questionable idea" a century later.

Salade niçoise has been known in the United States since at least the 1920s, when a cookbook for hotel chefs included two variations. The first was vegetarian, was dressed with mayonnaise, and included lettuce, tomatoes, potatoes, stringless beans and pimento-stuffed olives, while the second version was a composed salad, including the same ingredients, plus anchovies.

The dish was included in the 1936 cookbook L'Art culinaire moderne by Henri-Paul Pellaprat, which was first translated for American cooks in 1966 as Modern French Culinary Art. His version included cold cooked potatoes and cold cooked green beans.

A 1941 U.S. version by chef Louis Diat of the Ritz-Carlton Hotel included the anchovies, was dressed with vinaigrette, and added capers.

The highly influential 1961 American cookbook Mastering the Art of French Cooking included a recipe that incorporated a potato salad, green beans, both tuna and anchovies and a vinaigrette dressing. Co-author Julia Child later demonstrated the recipe on her television show, The French Chef, in 1970.

A recipe was included in Prosper Montagné's Larousse Gastronomique in 1938. It called for "equal parts diced potatoes and French beans. Season with oil, vinegar, salt and pepper. Mix with anchovy fillets, olives and capers. Garnish with quartered tomatoes."

French chef Paul Bocuse included a vegetarian version of the salad, garnished with chopped onion and chervil, in the 1977 English translation of his cookbook.

A 1979 variation by Pierre Franey is called Salade Niçoise aux Poires d'Avocat. Franey wrote, "I am convinced that had avocados been native to Provence they would have been an inevitable ingredient in the celebrated salad of that region, the salad niçoise." This version also included mushrooms and both black and green olives.

Claudia Roden is an advocate of innovation, and observed in 1984 that "There are not one or two or three versions of salade Nicoise — but dozens, depending on what is available."

In 1984, James Beard created a version incorporating rice for an Uncle Ben's advertising campaign.

In 1991, Jacques Pépin wrote an article that called the inclusion of canned tuna the "conventional choice", and recommended sautéed fresh tuna instead as "more elegant". Mimi Sheraton disagrees, commenting, "Salade Nicoise with fresh tuna is a travesty . . . if you like it, you are wrong!" In 1999, Pépin joined with Julia Child in a TV series, Julia and Jacques: Cooking at Home. Each prepared a salad they called "Near Nicoise". Child's version was a composed salad including tuna and anchovies canned in olive oil, and blanched green beans. Pépin's was a tossed salad including sauteed fresh tuna and potatoes.

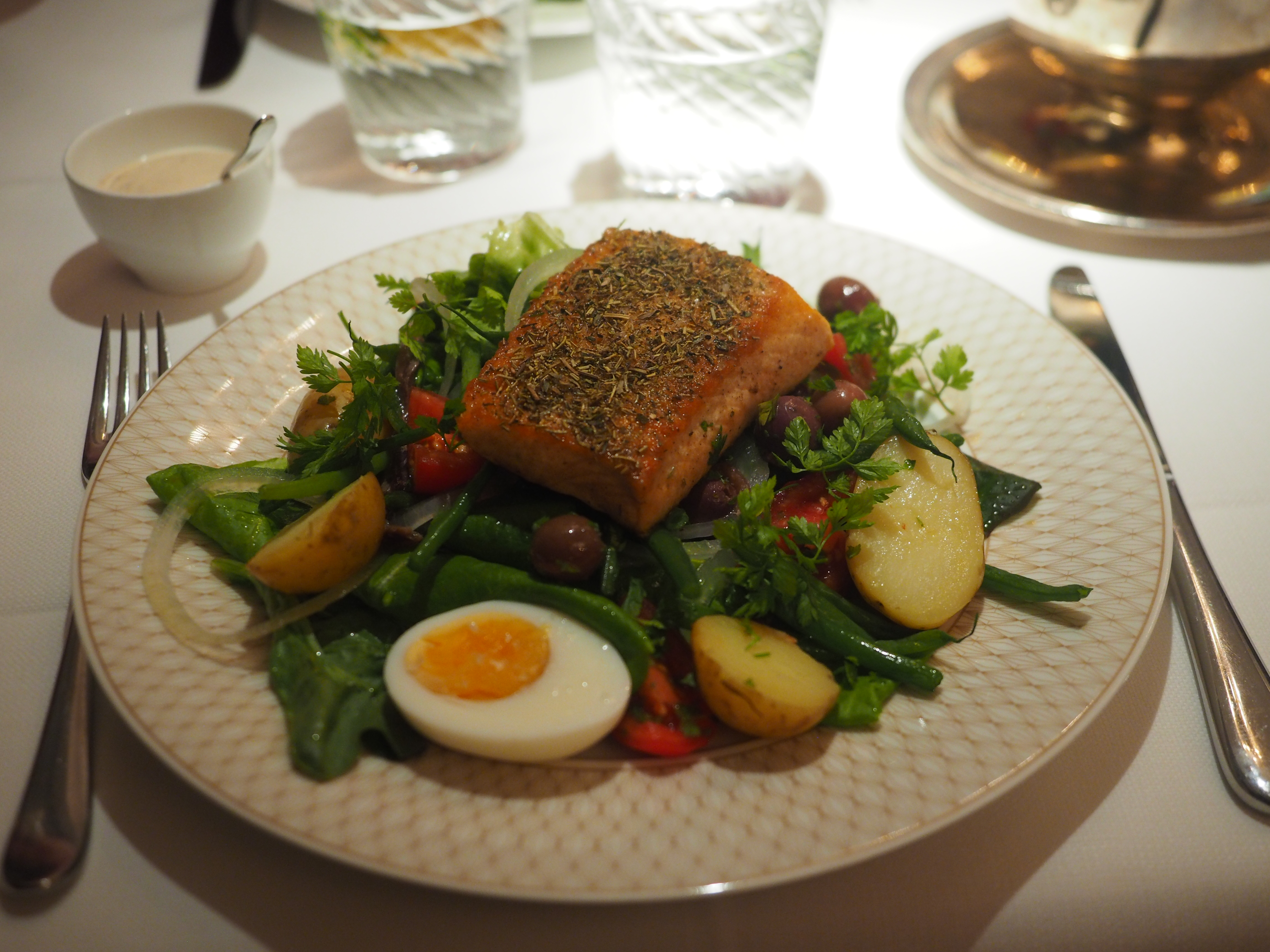
Salade niçoise with salmon at a restaurant in Stockholm, Sweden.

Many chefs have developed variations using seafood other than anchovies or tuna. Ina Garten, Jamie Oliver and Rachael Ray have published variations using salmon as the fish component. Bobby Flay has published variations incorporating shrimp and swordfish, both of which he describes as "Nicoise" in quotation marks. Sara Moulton also has a recipe incorporating shrimp. Instead of a conventional salad dressing, she uses an Italian tuna sauce. A wide variety of seafoods can be used in non-traditional variations, with San Francisco chef Jay Harlow commenting, "Mackerel, and even milder fish like rockfish, cod or halibut are also delicious served this way, as are good canned sardines."

Nigella Lawson has published a quick recipe that substitutes croutons for potatoes.

Cat Cora has published a variation that presents the salad as a lettuce wrap.

Emeril Lagasse has a recipe that uses a mayonnaise-based creamy Parmigiano-Reggiano dressing, and incorporates grilled yellowfin tuna loin along with Picholine olives in addition to the traditional black olives.

Guy Fieri has a recipe that incorporates couscous and mushrooms.

Mark Bittman has a variation that incorporates farro.

== Notable chefs ==
Many other chefs and food writers have written recipes for the salad. Among them are Daniel Boulud, Anthony Bourdain, Melissa d'Arabian, Hélène Darroze, Tyler Florence, Simon Hopkinson, Robert Irvine, Gordon Ramsay, Nigel Slater, Delia Smith, Martha Stewart, Michael Symon and Alice Waters.

== See also ==
- List of salads
- List of tuna dishes
- Pan bagnat, a sandwich consisting of the ingredients of a Niçoise salad stuffed in a loaf of bread
