= Pissalat =

French condiment made from anchovies

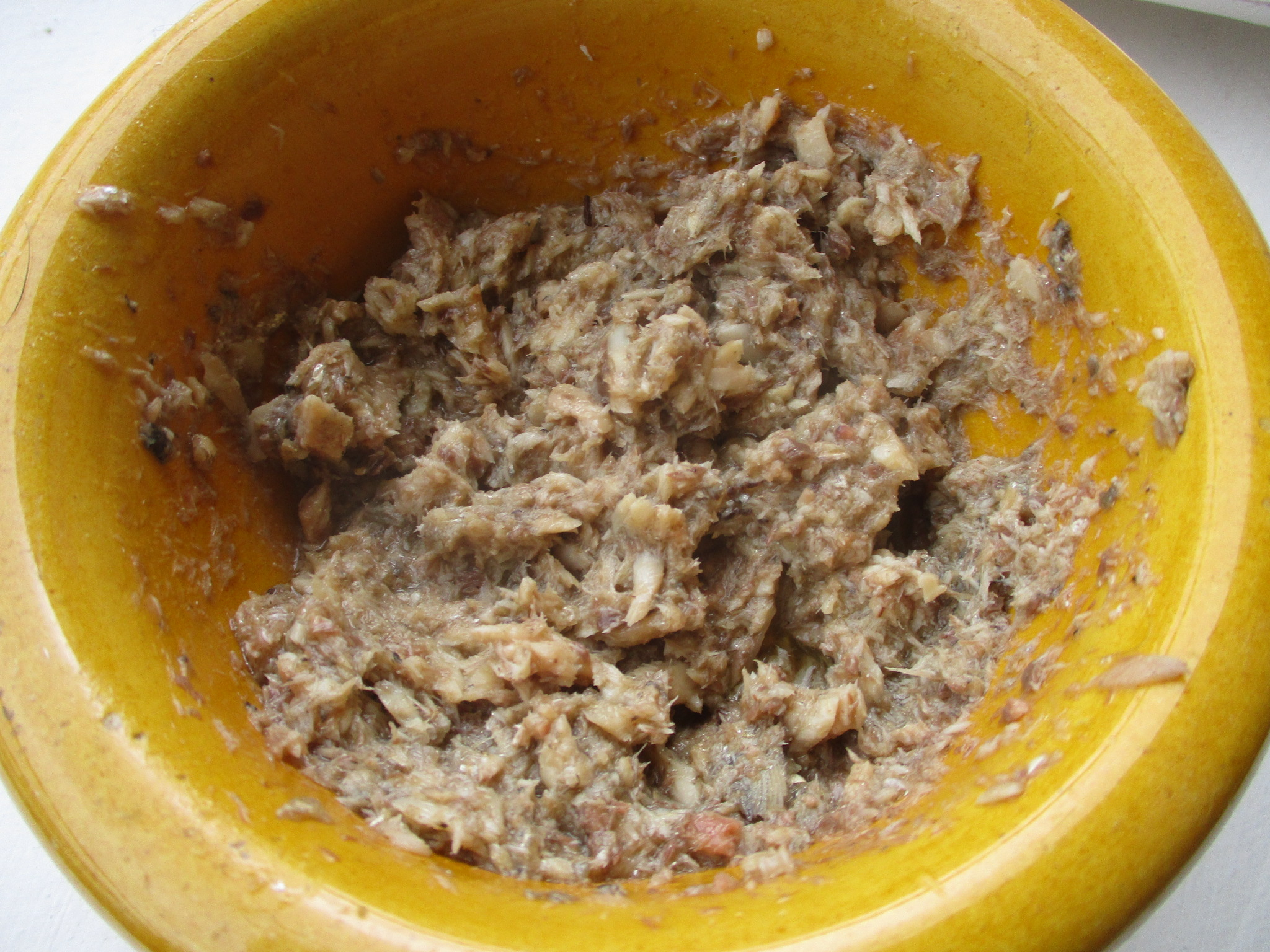
- Type: Sauce, condiment
- Course: Appetizer
- Place of origin: France
- Region or state: Nice and surrounding area
- Serving temperature: Hot or warm
- Main ingredients: Anchovies or other small fish
- Other information: Ingredient in the Niçois dish, pissaladière

Pissalat or pissala, is a condiment originating from the Nice region of France. The name comes from peis salat in Niçard and means 'salted fish'. It is made from anchovy puree flavoured with cloves, thyme, bay leaf and black pepper mixed with olive oil. Pissalat is used for flavouring hors d'oeuvres, fish, cold meats, and, especially, the local specialty, pissaladière.

== Etymology ==
The word pissala (in Nissard) or pissalat (in French) is composed of the old Provençal word peis for 'fish', and sala, the past participle of salar, which corresponds to the French saler ('to salt'). Together, they describe "preserves of small crushed and salted fish" or, similarly, "a piquant sauce made from the maceration of salted fish."

== History ==
The pissalat is similar to the siqqu, from the Mesopotamian Culinary Treatise of the 2nd millennium BC. J.-C. (c. 1700 BC) or with garum (juice or sauce, in Latin, from Roman antiquity). Since the time of ancient Rome, garum has been produced (with many variants) throughout the Mediterranean basin. It is a sauce obtained by macerating the heads and intestines of mackerel, sardines, anchovies, and aromatic plants in salt. The sauce thus obtained passed through a fine sieve, was recovered with a ladle, and was preserved in olive oil.

The manufacture of pissalat was a centuries-old local industry in the Nice-Côte d'Azur region, where the salting of sardines and anchovies employed roughly a dozen families at the beginning of the 19th century. The Niçois writer, Louis Roubaudi, notes in his 1843 book Nice and its surroundings: "The pissalat is very suitable for reviving the appetite when it is seasoned with olive oil, vinegar, and salted olives."

The sauce largely disappeared from commerce during the Second World War, and exists today only in the form of local traditional artisanal and family production (it is often replaced by salted anchovies or anchovy purée), in particular for the preparation of pissaladière.

== Recipe ==
The pissalat sauce is traditionally made from a mixture of anchovies, sardines, or poutine. These ingredients are pounded in a mortar, then macerated and fermented for several months in a large Provençal terracotta terrine with a brine of salt, pepper, olive oil, spices and herbs, thyme, bay leaf, cinnamon, and ground cloves (for preservation by salting).

The mixture is then stored in a cool place and stirred daily so as to quickly form a paste. The oil that rises to the surface must be skimmed every week. The resulting paste is passed through a fine sieve after one month. The pissalat can then be kept for some time in glass jars, covered with olive oil.

It can be eaten on slices of bread and accompany soups, vegetables, salads, meats, or other dishes of Provençal cuisine.

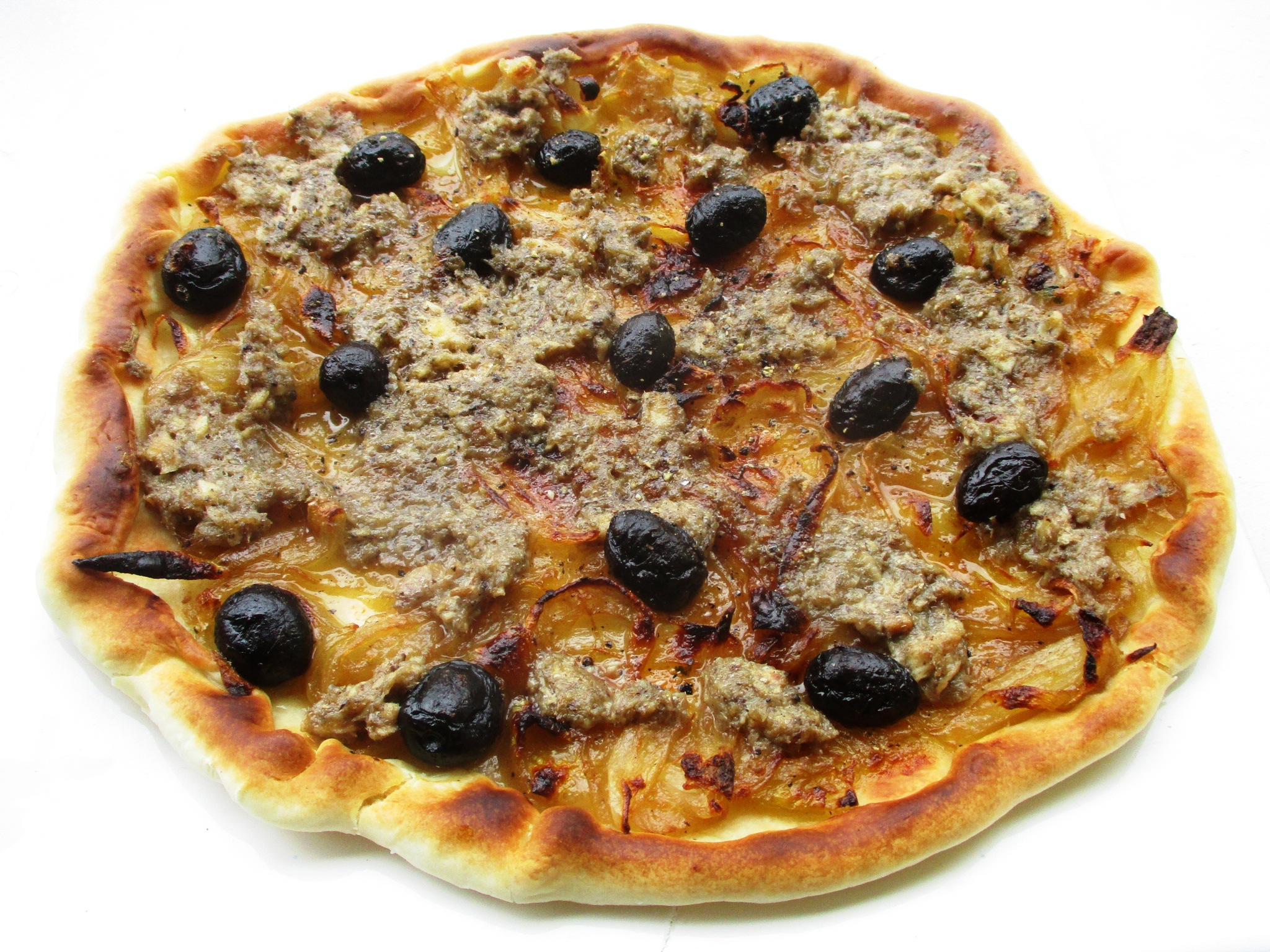
Pissaladière

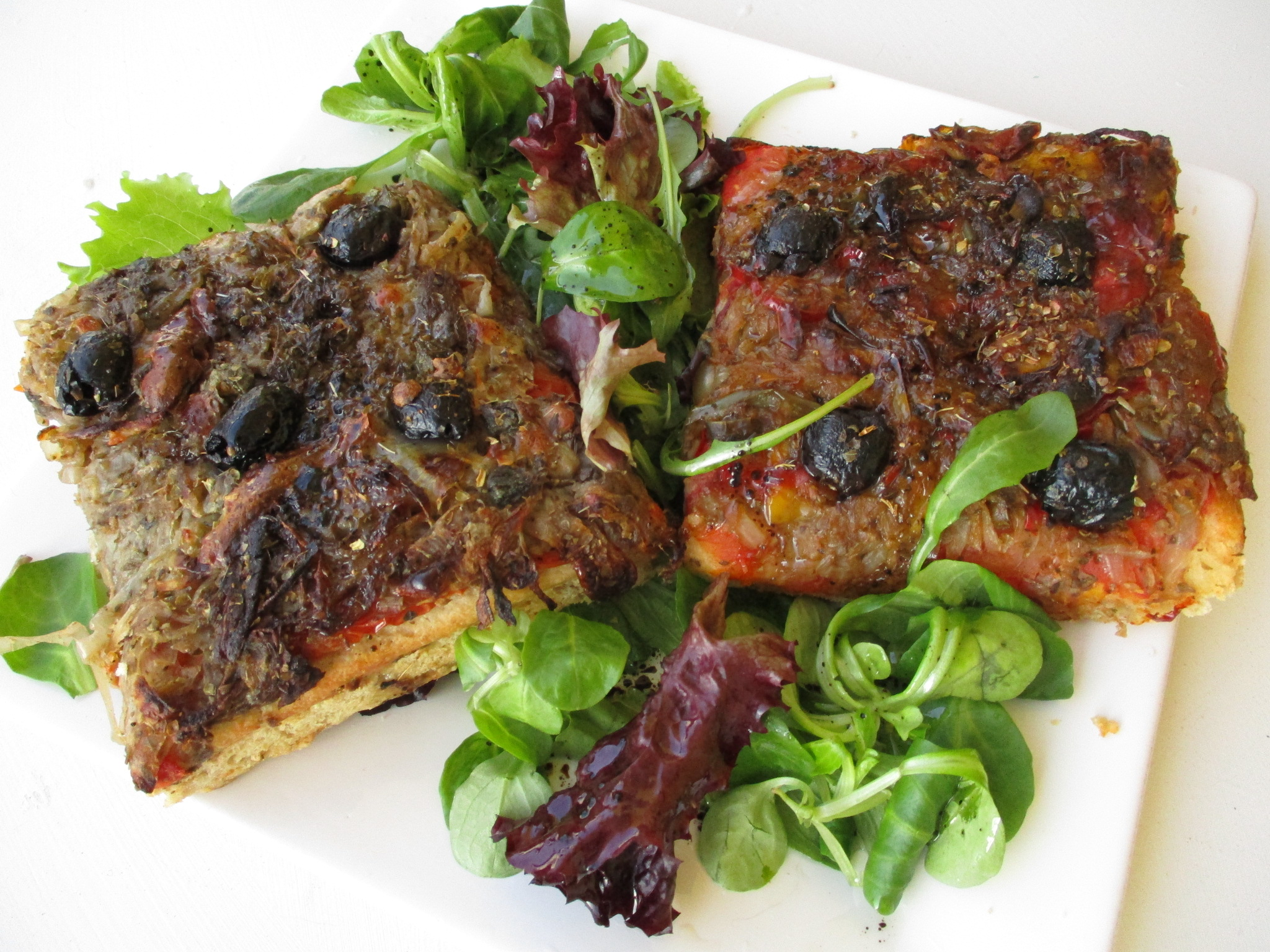
Pissaladière

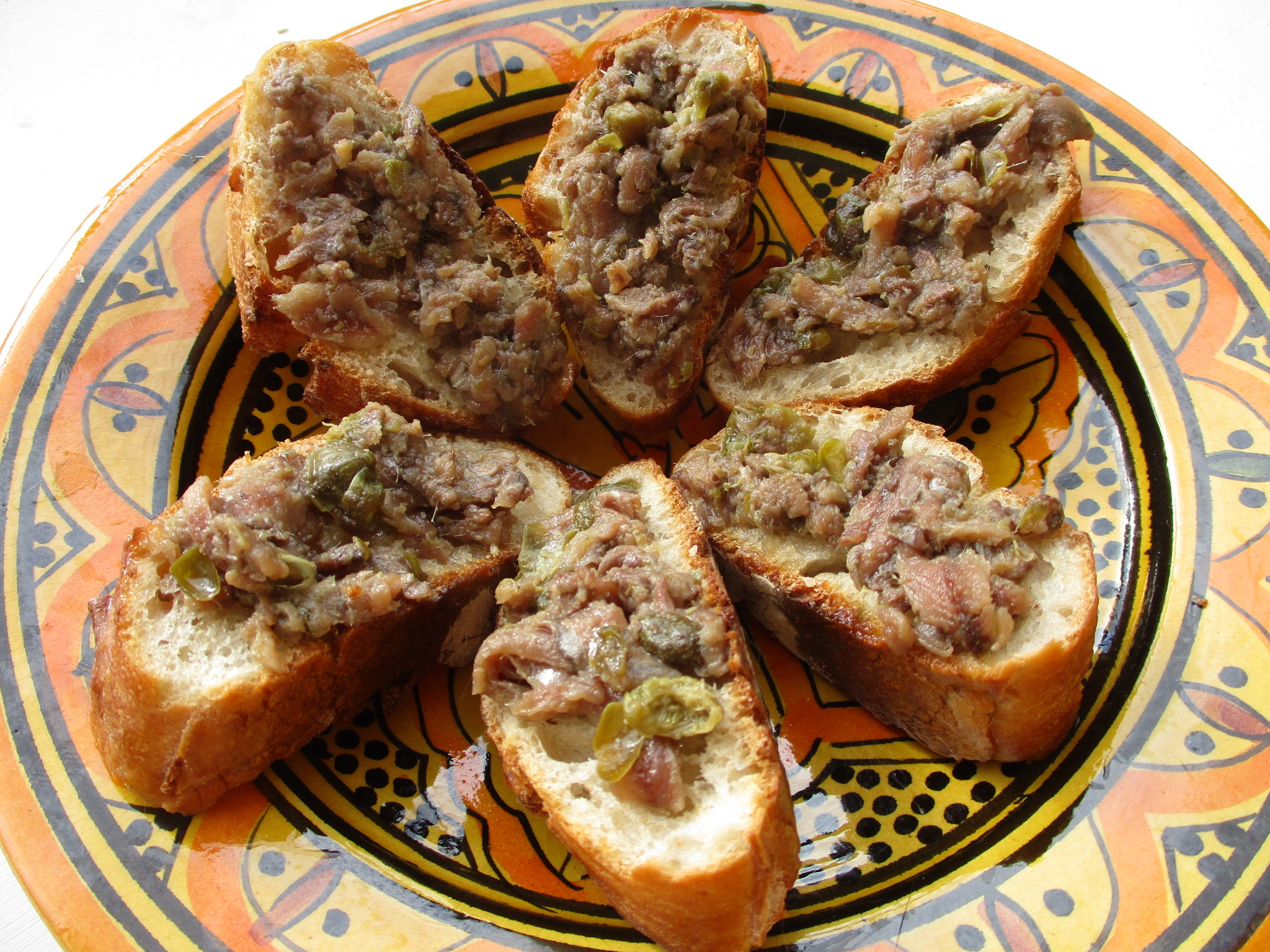
Anchoïade

== See also ==
- Prahok
- Larousse Gastronomique
- List of fish sauces
