= Bouteillan =

Olive cultivar

Olive (Olea europaea)
- Color of the ripe fruit: Black
- Also called: Redounan, Cayanne, Plant d'Aups
- Origin: France
- Notable regions: Var
- Hazards: Olive fruit fly, Prays oleae, Saissetia oleae, salinity
- Use: Oil and table
- Oil content: High
- Fertility: Self-fertile
- Growth form: Spreading
- Leaf: Elliptic-lanceolate
- Weight: Medium
- Shape: Ovoid
- Symmetry: Slightly asymmetrical

The Bouteillan is a cultivar of olives grown primarily in Provence. Originally from the town of Aups in the Var département, it is today grown also in Australia and the United States. It is mostly used for the production of oil. The Bouteillan is vulnerable to certain pests, but has a good resistance to cold.

== Extent ==
The Bouteillan is originally from the town of Aups in southern France. It is today grown primarily in the region of Var in Provence. It can also be found in Egypt, and as far away as Australia and the United States.

== Synonyms ==
The cultivar has several different local name varieties: Benesage, Redounan, Cayanne, Plant d'Aups and Plant de Salernes.

== Characteristics ==
It is a cultivar of medium-to-weak vigour, with a spreading growth form, and elliptic-lanceolate leaves of medium length and width. The olives are of medium weight, and ovoid, slightly asymmetrical in shape. The stone is rounded at both ends, with a rough surface and a mucro.

Depending on the region, this cultivar is picked from the end of October until New Year. When fully mature, the colour of the fruit is Burgundy. The olive is clingstone – the stone clings to the flesh.

== Processing ==
Descriptions of the Bouteillan vary between a dual-use cultivar and a pure oil cultivar. Though it can be eaten, it is in reality mainly used for extraction of oil. The yield depends to a large extent on the date of harvest, and goes from about 15% to as much as 25%. The taste of the oil, if the fruit is harvested early, is strong and herbal. With a later harvest the taste becomes more fruity, reminiscent of ripe pears.

== Agronomy ==
It is considered a highly productive cultivar, and shows little tendency towards biennial bearing, (i.e. that a good yield is followed by a weaker one the next year) a common problem in many other olive cultivars. It requires light but frequent pruning and irrigation.

The Bouteillan is self-fertile, but it can still benefit from the presence of certain other pollinators. Among the olive cultivars used for pollination are the Picholine, Corniale and Grossane.

It is vulnerable to certain biological pests, in particular the Bactrocera oleae (Olive fruit fly), Prays oleae and Saissetia oleae. It is also sensitive to soil salinity, but has a high resistance to cold.
