= Cailletier =

Olive cultivar

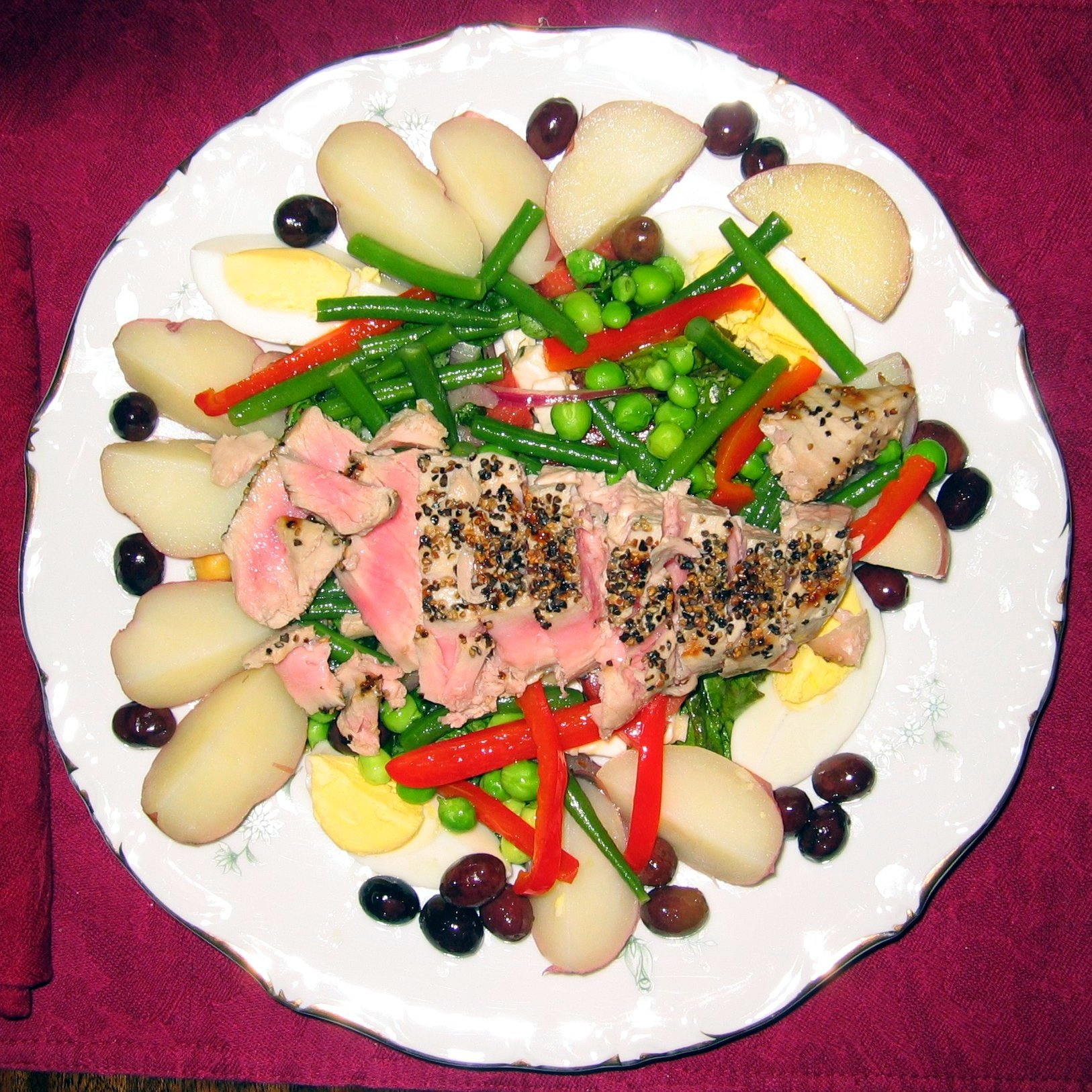
- Cailletier used in a salad

Olive (Olea europaea)
- Color of the ripe fruit: Black
- Also called: Niçoise
- Origin: France, Italy
- Notable regions: Alpes-Maritimes, Italian Riviera
- Hazards: Olive fruit fly, Saissetia oleae, cold
- Use: Oil and table
- Oil content: High
- Fertility: Self-fertile
- Growth form: Erect
- Leaf: Elliptic-lanceolate
- Weight: Low
- Shape: Ovoid
- Symmetry: Symmetrical

The Cailletier, (Note: French pronunciation: [kajtje]) also known in English by the Italian name Taggiasca, (Note: Italian pronunciation: [tadˈdʒaska]) is a cultivar of olives grown primarily in the Alpes-Maritimes region near Nice and the Riviera di Ponente, Italy. It is best known under the name Niçoise, (Note: English: /niːˈswɑːz/ nee-SWAHZ) which signifies its curing method. It is commonly used as an important ingredient in the salade niçoise. It can also be used for the production of oil. This cultivar is particularly susceptible to the olive fruit fly.

== Extent ==
The Cailletier is particularly common in the Alpes-Maritimes region of southern France, where it is the main variety, and also in nearby Liguria in Italy. It can also be found as far away as Japan, Australia and the United States.

== Synonyms ==
In Italy the cultivar is known under the name of Taggiasca, which derives from the town of Taggia. Locally it is known under a number of different synonyms, including Cayet or Cayon, Grassenc, Olivier de Grasse, Pendoulier and Pleureur. The name Niçoise is not a synonym, but the name of the olive after a particular processing (see below).

== Characteristics ==
It is a cultivar of good strength and large size, with an erect growth form, and elliptic-lanceolate leaves of medium length and width. The olives are of low weight, ovoid shape and symmetrical. The stone has a rounded apex and base, with a rugose surface and a mucro.

For use in oil production the olive is harvested in mid-November. Fruits for use as table olives, on the other hand, can be harvested up until May. The fully ripe olives have "a dark colour that ranges from black brownish-purple to brownish-black".

== Processing ==
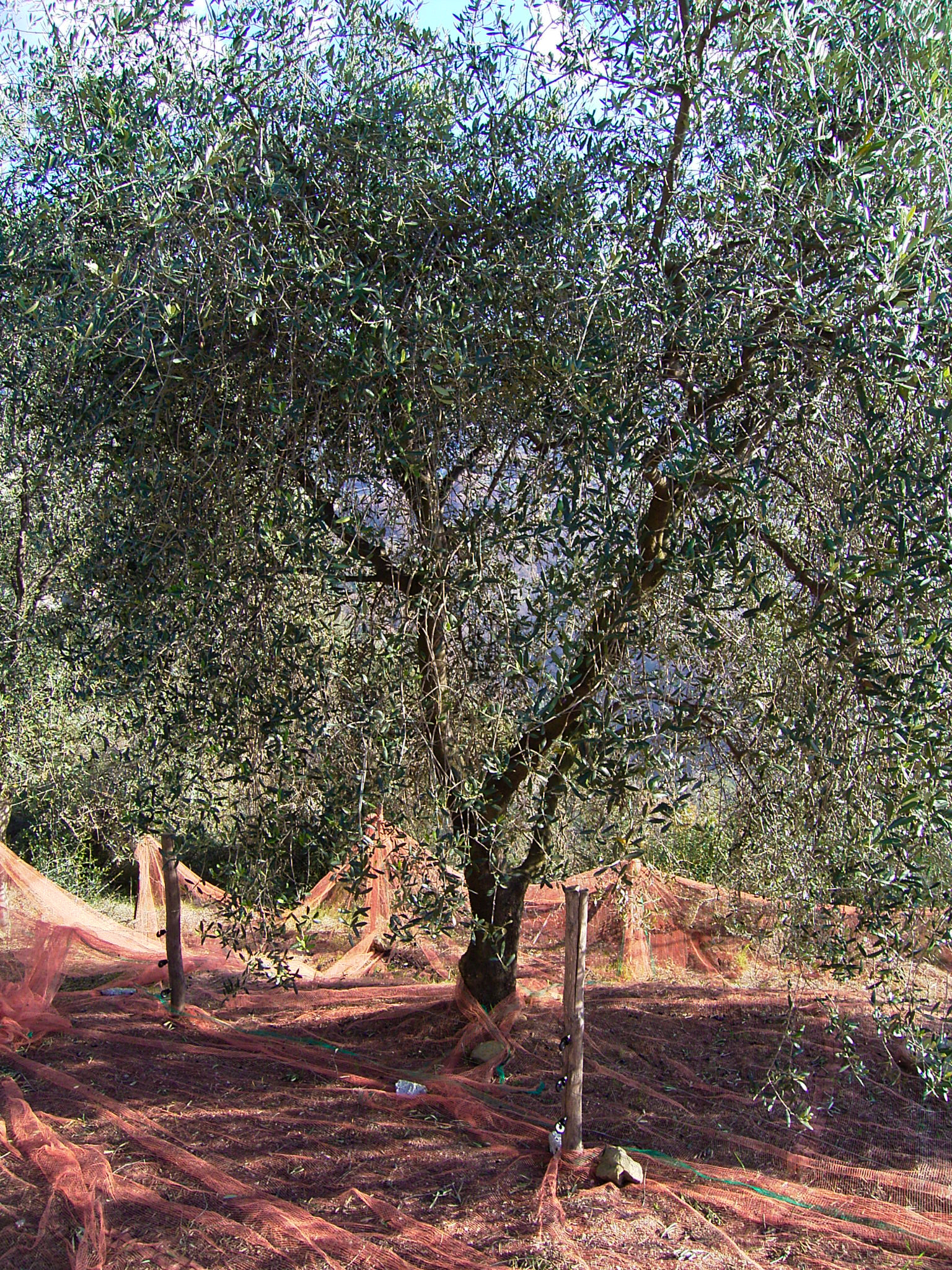
Cailletier cultivar near Contes, Alpes-Maritimes, with an olive harvest net on the ground

The Cailletier is a dual use cultivar, used both for the extraction of oil and as a table olive. In spite of the fact that the stone is relatively large, it gives a yield of oil (20–25%). The oil has a sweet delicate quality, and is appreciated by novice olive oil consumers. It has a taste of fresh almond and hazelnut. For a more bitter, strong taste, a harvest before the end of the year is preferable. In France the cultivar is used in three officially approved appellations: the "AOC Huile d'Olive de Nice", "AOC Olive de Nice" and "AOC Pâte d'Olive de Nice"; in Italy the quality of the Taggiasca cultivar is granted by Protected Designation of Origin - PDO regulations.

The best-known application of the Cailletier is for Niçoise salads. For this purpose the olives are cured black, a process carried out in the Nice area, hence the name.

== Agronomy ==
It is considered a productive cultivar, but with a tendency towards biennial bearing, i.e. that a good yield is followed by a weaker one the next year. It is generally agreed that the cultivar is self-fertile, but some authorities still recommend the presence of other pollinators.

It is vulnerable to certain organic pests, primarily the Bactrocera oleae (Olive fruit fly). Other risks are the Saissetia oleae, Spilocaea oleaginea and Sooty moulds. Also starlings are particularly fond of the Cailletier. While somewhat vulnerable to cold, it has high resistance to drought.
