= Cayon olive =

Olive cultivar

Cayon

Olive (Olea europaea)
- Color of the ripe fruit: Black
- Also called: Entrecastellen, Plant d'Etranger, Race De Montfort
- Origin: France
- Notable regions: Var
- Hazards: Olive fruit fly, cold
- Use: Oil
- Oil content: High/medium
- Fertility: Self-sterile
- Growth form: Spreading
- Leaf: Elliptic
- Weight: Medium
- Shape: Ovoid
- Symmetry: Asymmetrical

The Cayon is a cultivar of olives grown primarily in the Var region of southern France. It is used primarily for the production of olive oil. The Cayon is highly valued for its role as a pollinator of other olive varieties.

== Extent and synonyms ==
The Cayon is particularly common in the Var region, but is also grown in other parts of southern France, and in Algeria. Among the names used locally for the Cayon, are Entrecastellen, Plant d'Etranger, Nasies, Montfortaise and Race De Montfort. In Algeria it is known as Roulette de Sóumam.

== Characteristics ==
It is a cultivar of good strength, with a spreading growth form and elliptic leaves that are short and of medium width. The olives are of medium weight, ovoid shape and asymmetrical. The stone has a rounded apex and pointed base, with a smooth surface and the presence of a mucro. It is an early cultivar, and harvesting starts in early November. When fully mature, the colour of the fruit is black.

== Processing ==
The Cayon is mainly used for extraction of oil, and gives a medium yield (18–22%). Oil extraction is a relatively easy process in this cultivar. The taste of the oil is described as "fruity and balanced, finish with the softness of almond". The Cayon can also be mixed with the Grossane for olive oil production.

== Agronomy ==
It is considered a productive cultivar, with a tendency towards biennial bearing, i.e. that a good yield is followed by a weaker one the next year. Its rooting ability is medium-to-high.

There is some disagreement over the fertility of the Cayon, though most authorities agree that it is self-sterile, and depends on the presence of other pollinators. The Cayon is also highly valued for its use as a pollinator of other olive tree. Among the cultivars it helps pollinate are the Olivière, and the Tanche.

It does not show any particular vulnerability to the major pests, with the exception of the Bactrocera oleae (Olive fruit fly). It is also relatively vulnerable to cold, but sustains drought quite well.
