= Pissaladière =

Flat bread topped with onions, anchovies and olives

Pissalandrea or Pissaladière
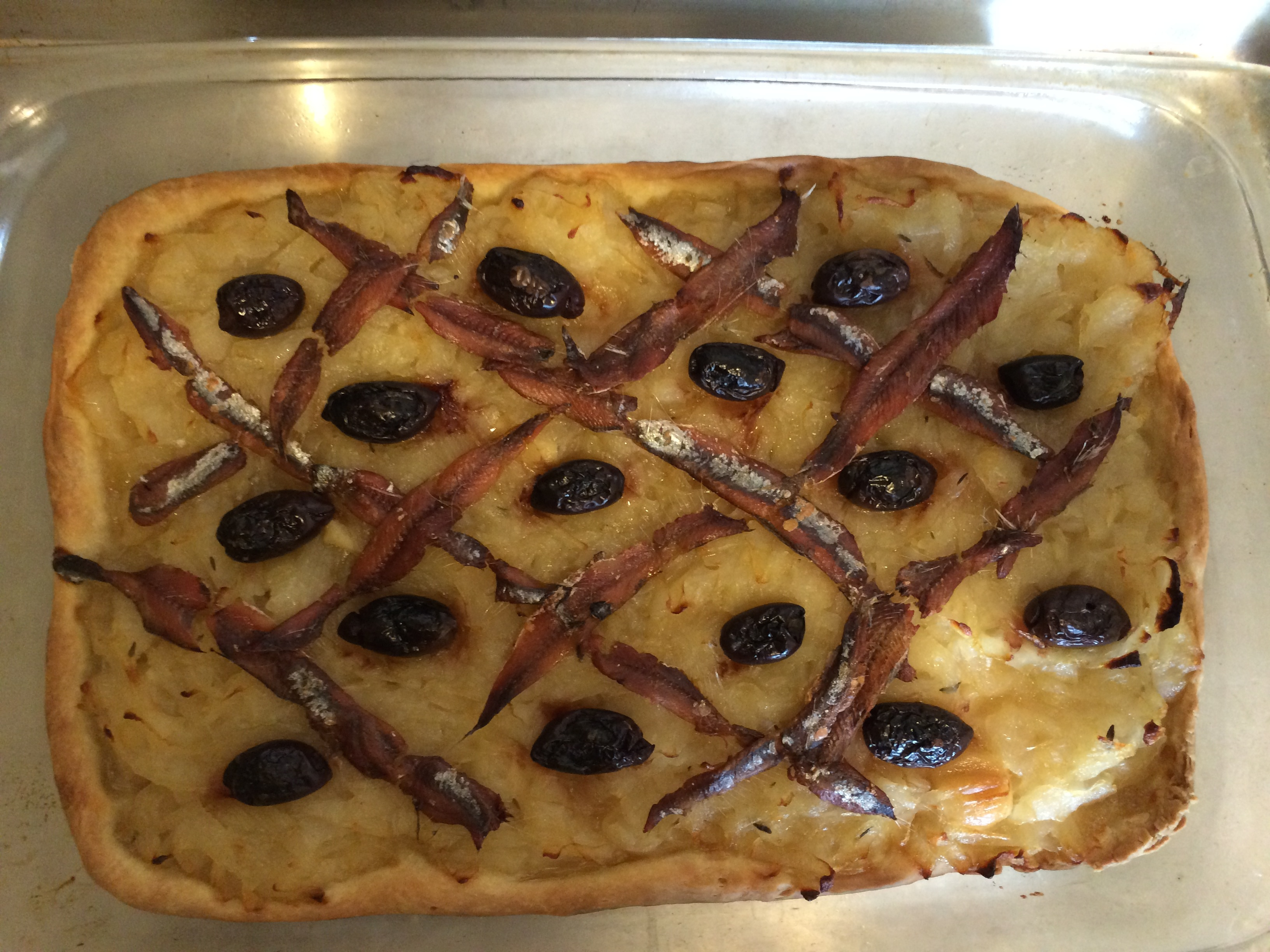
- Typical pissaladière from Nice
- Alternative names: Pissaladiera, pissaladina, piscialandrea, pizza all'Andrea,
- Type: Focaccia, Fougasse
- Place of origin: France
- Region or state: Provence
- Serving temperature: Warm or cold
- Main ingredients: Bread dough, onions, olives, garlic, anchovies or pissalat

Pissaladière (UK: /ˌpɪsælædˈjɛər/, US: /ˌpiːsɑːlɑːdˈjɛər/, French: [pisaladjɛʁ]; Niçard: pissaladiera [pisalaˈdjeɾɔ] or pissaladina [pisalaˈdinɔ]; Ligurian: piscialandrea [piʃalaŋˈdɾeːa] or sardenaira) is a dish of flatbread with toppings from the region of Provence and the French city of Nice. It is often compared to pizza. The dough is usually a bread dough thicker than that of the classic pizza Margherita, and the traditional topping in Nice usually consists of caramelised (almost pureed) onions, black olives (generally caillettes) and anchovies (whole, and sometimes also with pissalat, a type of anchovy paste).

== Etymology and history ==
The etymology of the word seems to originate from the Latin piscis "fish", which in turn originated pissalat, the name of an anchovy paste (via peis salat, "salted fish" Niçard).

The first written recipe was found in a document of the year 879 in Provence. This old recipe included onions and pissalat, confirming that the name derives from this anchovy puré.

== Description ==
The dough is usually a bread dough thicker than that of the classic pizza margherita (i.e. Pizza al taglio), and the traditional topping usually consists of caramelised (almost pureed) onions, black olives, and anchovies (whole, and sometimes also with pissalat). In the version of Menton the dough is enriched with tomatoes.

Some other variants exist in France:

- The pichade, typical from Menton, is a pissaladière with a tomato base.
- The tarte de Menton is a pissaladière without anchovies.

== See also ==
- Cuisine of France
- Cuisine of Provence
