= Tanche =

Olive cultivar

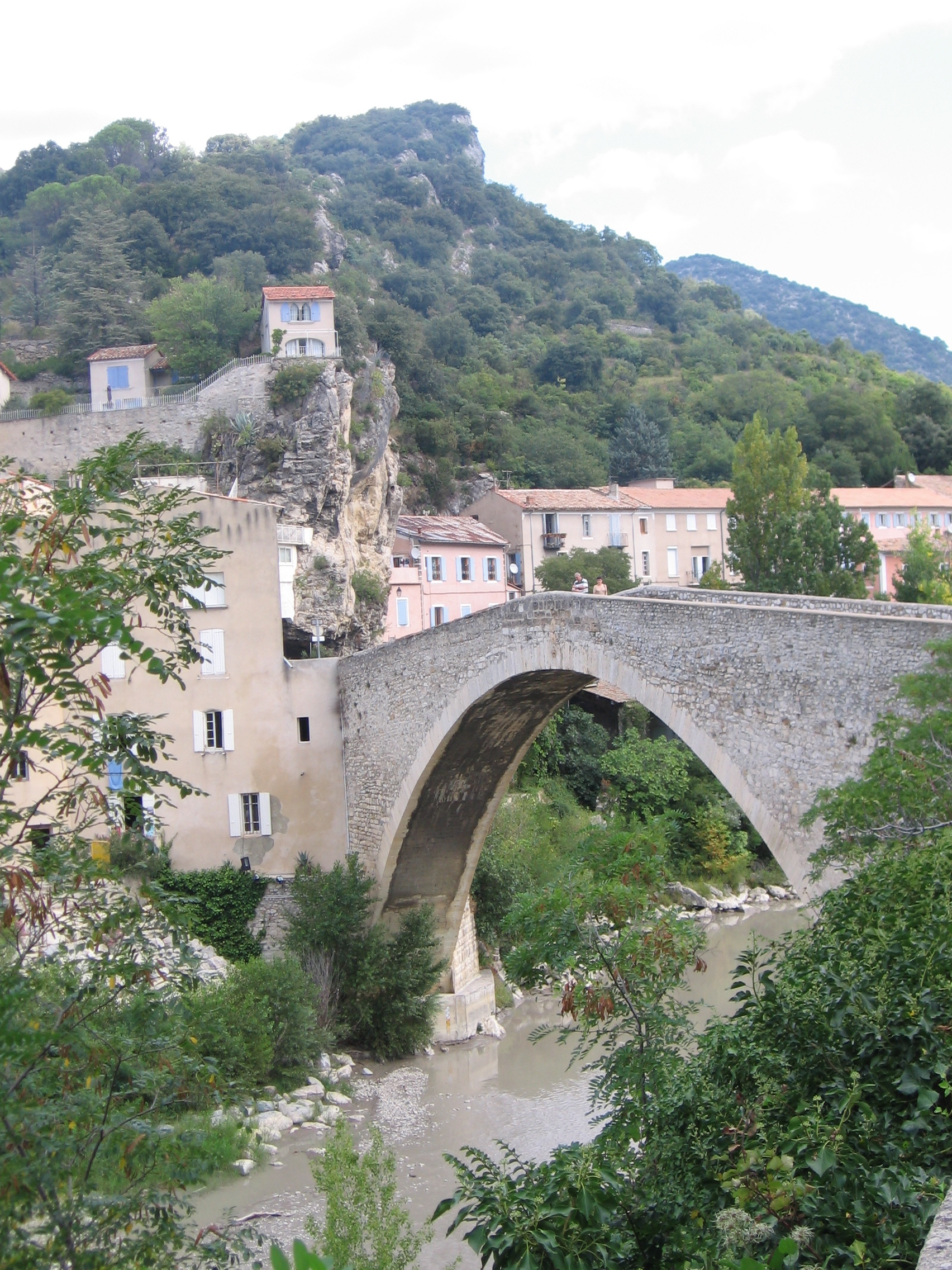
- Nyons, the place associated with Tanche olives

Olive (Olea europaea)
- Color of the ripe fruit: Black
- Also called: Olive de Nyons, Olive de Carpentras
- Origin: France
- Notable regions: Drôme, Vaucluse
- Hazards: Spilocaea oleaginea, Verticillium dahliae, Bactrocera oleae
- Use: Oil and table
- Oil content: High
- Fertility: Self-sterile
- Growth form: Spreading
- Leaf: Elliptic
- Weight: 5–6 g
- Shape: Spherical
- Symmetry: Slightly asymmetrical

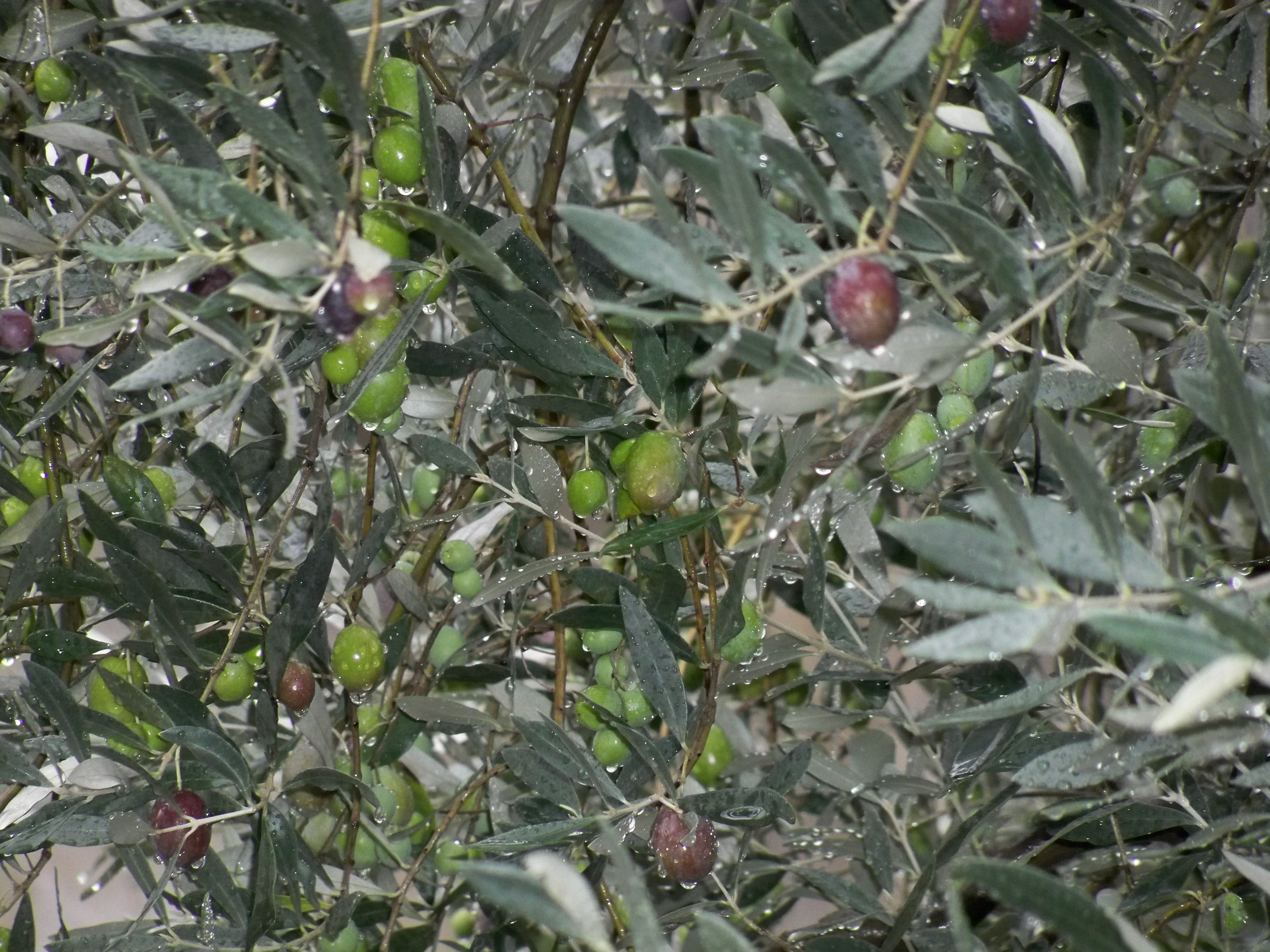

The Tanche is a French olive cultivar. It is grown primarily in the Drôme and Vaucluse regions of southern France. It is often referred to as a perle noire, the "Black Pearl of Provence". The Tanche is said to have been introduced to France by the Greeks of Massilia, around the fourth century BC.

== Extent ==
The Tanche is grown mostly in Drôme and northern Vaucluse regions of southern France. Attempts to grow this variety outside of its native region are rarely successful.

== Synonyms ==
Since the cultivar is largely local in scope, it also has few synonyms. The olives grown in the region around the town of Nyons are normally referred to as Olive de Nyons, or simply Nyons, and this is the name under which the olive is best known to the rest of the world. Another synonym, used in parts of Vaucluse, is Olive de Carpentras.

== Characteristics ==
It is a cultivar of medium vigour, with a spreading growth form, elliptic leaves, an expansive global crown, and large size. The olives are of medium-to-high weight (5–6 g), elliptic in shape with a rounded tip and slightly asymmetrical. The stone is ovoid, rounded on both ends, with a rough surface and a mucro.

The fruits can be harvested at smaller size in late November, while for larger olives it is better to wait until December or January. When fully mature, the colour of the fruit is a violet black.

== Processing ==
The Tanche is a dual-use cultivar, used both as a table olive and for extraction of oil. It is very productive and gives a yield of 22–25%. The oil has a "smooth taste and an aroma of crisp green apples and freshly cut grass". The very sweet taste is normally associated with the late harvest. Olives picked at a later maturity give an oil with much more character.

This cultivar is the only one to enjoy the appellation of Nyons, which it was granted in 1994. Oils of this denomination must contain at least 95% Tanche. The Tanche is also popularly used to make the dish tapenade.

== Agronomy ==
The cultivar is slow to get into production, but after that production is high. It is a self-sterile variety, so it needs pollinators for fertilisation. The most common pollinator is the Cayon. There are today more than 230,000 Tanche olive trees, representing an annual production of around 400 tons of table olives and 200 tons of olive oil.

Tanche is vulnerable to certain pests, in particular Spilocaea oleaginea, Verticillium dahliae and Bactrocera oleae. Other than this, the main threat to the plant is wind, to which it is highly susceptible. It is quite resistant to cold.
