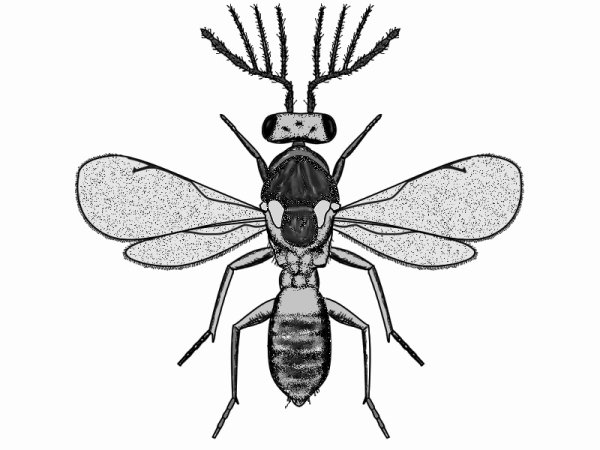
- Pnigalio mediterraneus

Scientific classification
- Domain: Eukaryota
- Kingdom: Animalia
- Phylum: Arthropoda
- Class: Insecta
- Order: Hymenoptera
- Family: Eulophidae
- Subfamily: Eulophinae
- Genus: Pnigalio; Schrank, 1802

Type species
- Pnigalio pectinicornis (Linnaeus, 1758)

Species
- 66 species

Synonyms
- Notanisomorphomyia Girault, 1913; Ratzeburgiola Erdös, 1958; Tineophaga Rondani, 1868

= Pnigalio =

Genus of wasps

Pnigalio is a genus of hymenopteran insects of the family Eulophidae. Nearly 100 species have been described of which about half may be valid. All species are parasites of other insects. Their biology varies widely among those species that have been studied. Some are ectoparasites, others parasitoid, and still others are hyperparasitoids and their hosts include beetles, flies, hymenopteran and lepidopterans.
