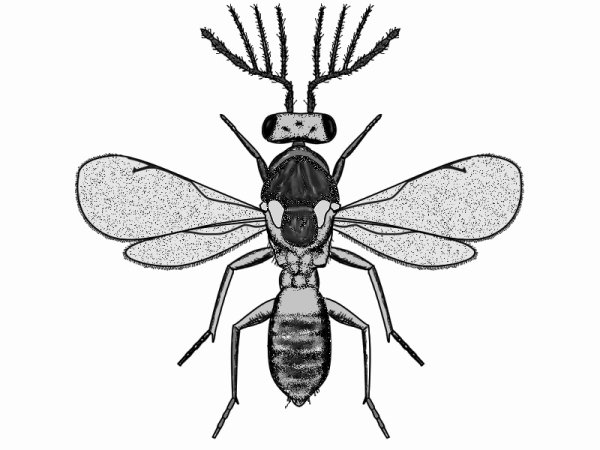

Scientific classification
- Kingdom: Animalia
- Phylum: Arthropoda
- Class: Insecta
- Order: Hymenoptera
- Family: Eulophidae
- Genus: Pnigalio
- Species: P. mediterraneus

Binomial name
- Pnigalio mediterraneus Ferrière & Delucchi, 1957

= Pnigalio mediterraneus =

Species of insect

Pnigalio mediterraneus is a species of insect in the family Eulophidae. It is a parasitoid of the olive fruit fly and the horse-chestnut leaf miner.

Some works have considered this species to be a synonym of P. agraules, however molecular and morphological characterization has been used to demonstrate that they are distinct but closely related.
