= Olive de Nice =

Type of French olive

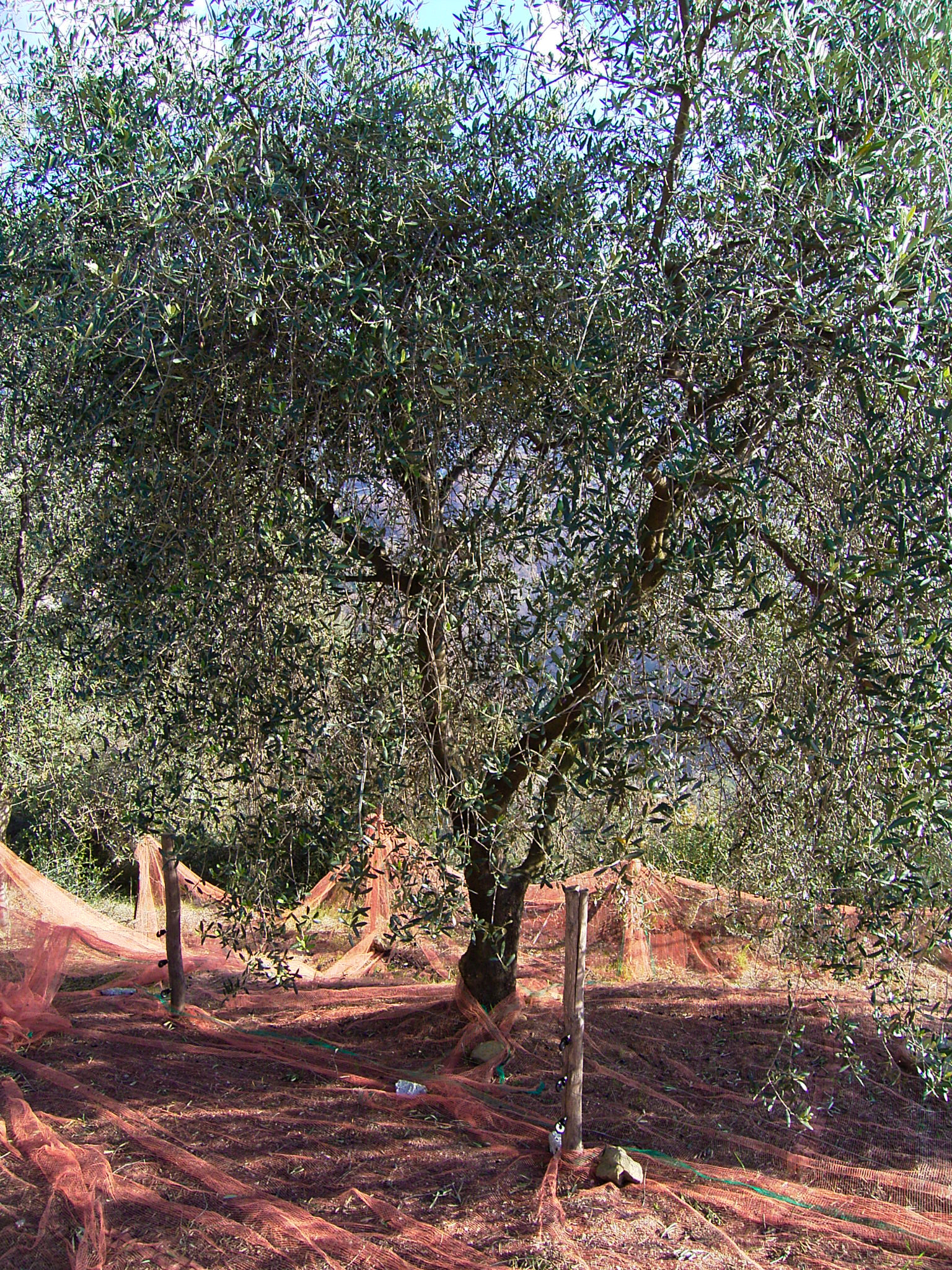
Olive Harvest near Contes in Nice

The Olive de Nice is a PDO olive from the Alpes-Maritimes area of France.

The rules state that they must be of the Cailletier variety, and harvest must not exceed 6 tons per hectare.
