= Anchoïade =

French dipping sauce

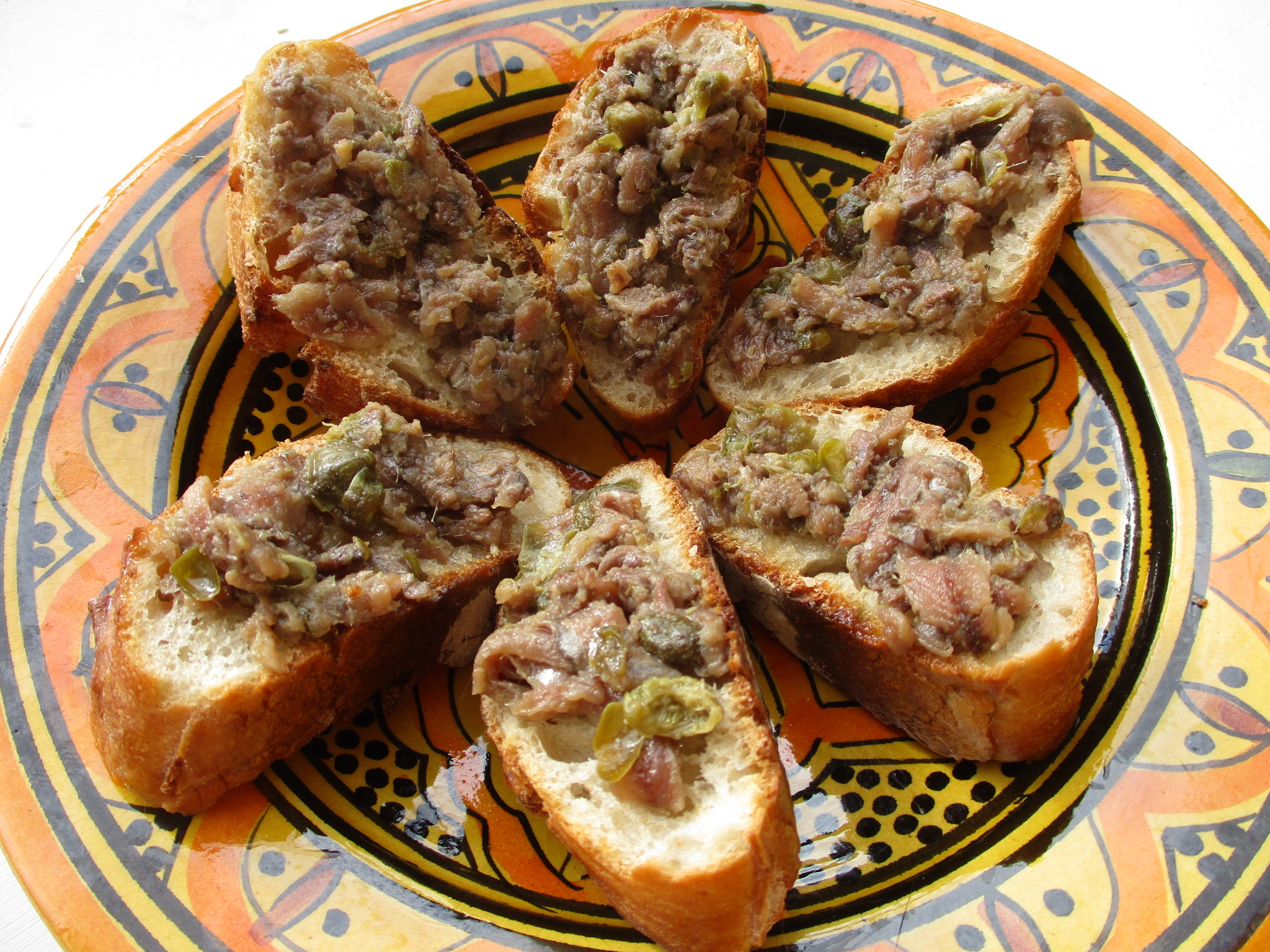
Anchoïade

Anchoïade (Occitan: Anchoa) is a French dipping sauce originating in the Provence region of France. The main ingredients are anchovies, olive oil, capers, and olives. It can be served both hot and cold. Anchoïade is traditionally prepared as an aperitif or used as a dip for crudités, and served on bread.

The first version of this recipe appears in chef Jean-Baptiste Reboul's book Cuisinière provençale.

== See also ==
- Dipping sauce
- Bagna càuda
