= Picholine =

Olive cultivar

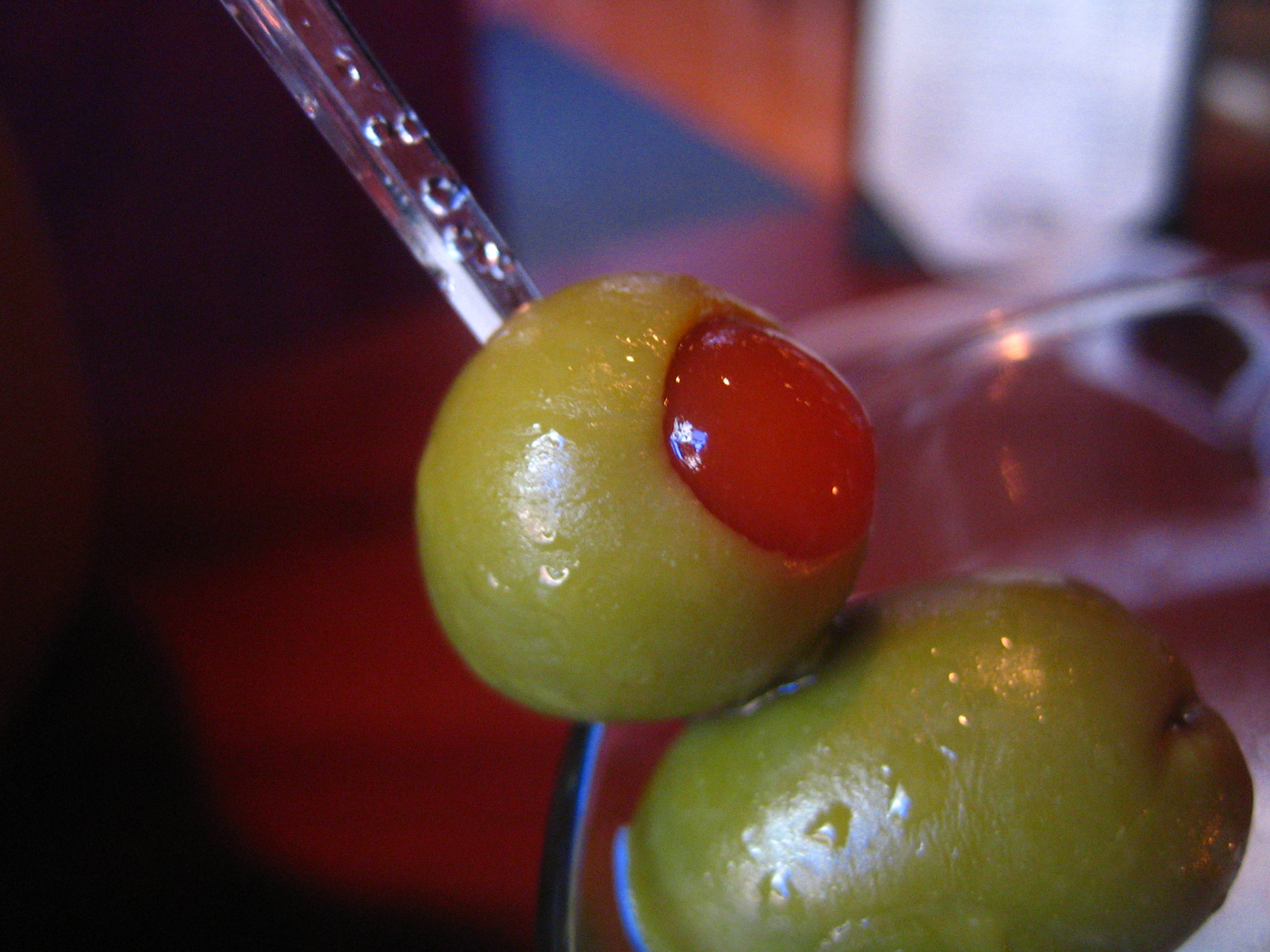
- The Picholine is best known as a cocktail olive.

Olive (Olea europaea)
- Color of the ripe fruit: Green
- Also called: Colliasse, Fausse Lucques, Piquette
- Origin: France
- Notable regions: Provence, worldwide
- Hazards: Gloeosporium olivarum, Palpita unionalis
- Use: Oil and table
- Oil content: Low/medium
- Fertility: Partially self-fertile
- Growth form: Spreading
- Leaf: Elliptic-lanceolate
- Weight: 3–5 g
- Shape: Ovoid
- Symmetry: Slightly asymmetrical

The Picholine is a French cultivar of olives. It is the most widely available cultivar in France. Though originally from Gard in southern France, it is today grown all over the world. The Picholine is best known as a cocktail olive, though it is also used to make olive oil. It is the most common variety of olive used for oil from Morocco.

== Extent ==
The Picholine olive is originally from the region of Gard in southern France. Even though it is today most common in Provence and other parts of France and Italy, it is also grown in Morocco, Israel, Chile, the United States and other places around the world.

== Synonyms ==
The Picholine has many different names of local variety. In Gard and southern France it is referred to as Coiasse, Colliasse, Piquette, Plant de Collias, Fausse Lucques (false Lucques) or Lucques Batarde (bastard Lucques). In Tunisia is it called Judoleine, while in other countries it is often named Picholine de Languedoc after its historic region of origin (Gard is part of Languedoc).

== Characteristics ==
It is a cultivar of middle strength, with a spreading growth form, and medium size, and a crown of an open shape. The leaves are elliptic-lanceolate, of a medium length and width. The olives are of medium weight (3–5 g), ovoid shape and slightly asymmetrical. The stone is pointed at both ends, with a smooth surface and a mucro.

The fruit is harvested in October and November, while still green, for use as table olives. For the purpose of producing oil, the olives are picked later, once they have turned black. The exact time of harvest for oil is a matter of judgement for the individual farmer; an early harvest gives a fruity taste, while a later harvest brings out more sweetness.

== Processing ==
The Picholine is most notable for its use as a cocktail olive. For this purpose they are lye cured, then fermented in brine for up to a year, giving them a slightly salty taste. It is also used for extraction of oil, but gives only a medium yield. Normally 20–22% can be extracted, but plants under irrigation sometimes produce as little as 15–18%. The taste of the oil is fruity with a hint of bitterness.

== Agronomy ==
It is considered a cultivar of good, constant production. The tree is of medium size, and assumes a low, spread-out form when carrying fruit. It adapts well to different forms of soils and climates.

It is generally agreed that the cultivar is only partially self-fertile, so it can take advantage of a certain presence of pollinators. Among the olive cultivars used for pollination are the Bouteillan, Leccino, Lucques, Manzanillo, and Sigoise.

It is vulnerable to certain organic pests, including Gloeosporium olivarum, Palpita unionalis and Liothrips oleae. It is also vulnerable to cold; while an adult tree can sustain temperatures down to −12 to −14 °C (10 to 7 °F), young trees need much higher temperatures to survive. This can be a problem in the Gard and Provence regions, where winters can often be fierce.

== Cross breeding ==
Hybridization of the Picholine and Manzanillo (Bellini et al. 2002b) resulted in the newer cultivars Arno, Tevere, and Basento.

== See also ==
- Lucques
