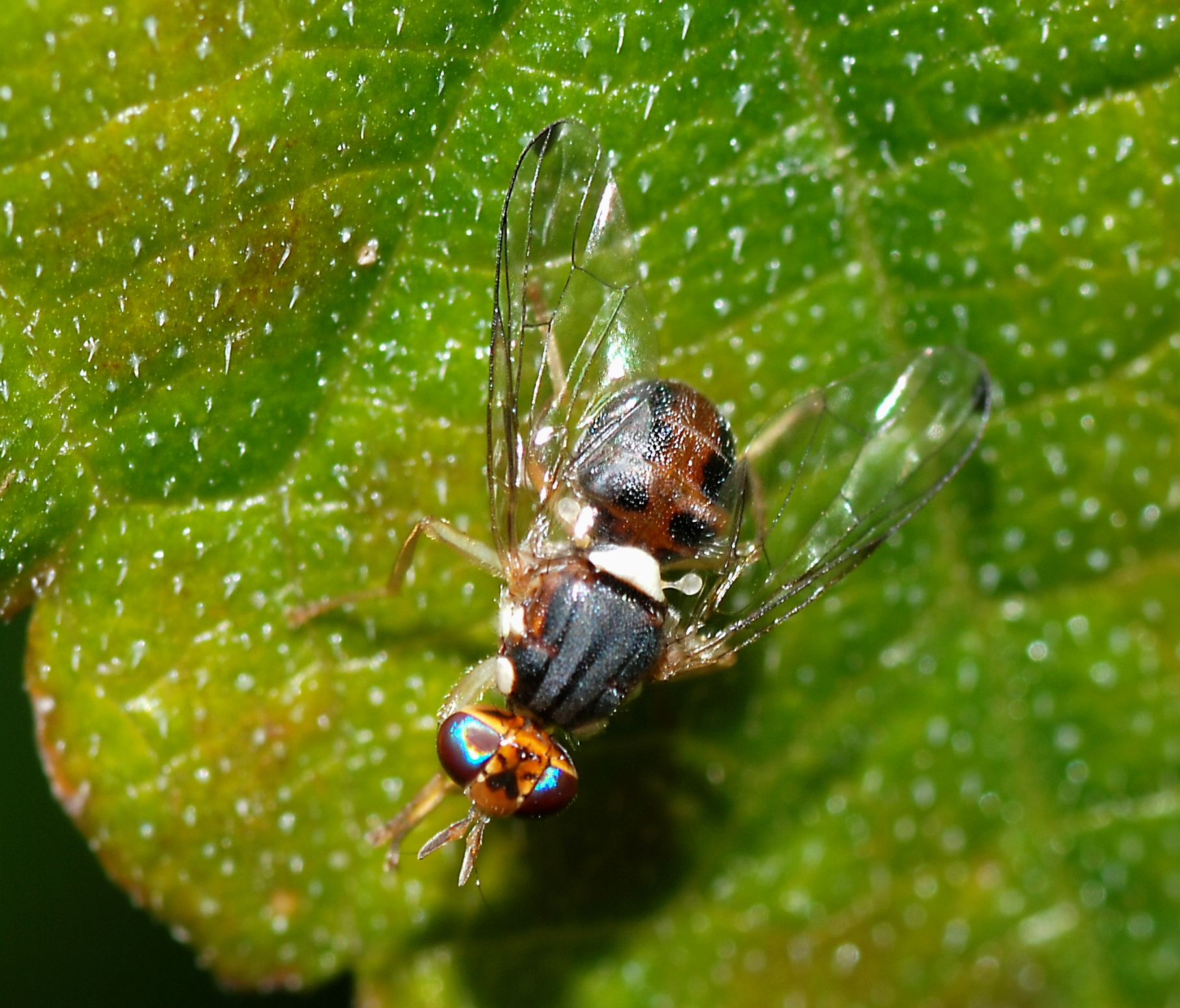
- Adult on leaf

Scientific classification
- Kingdom: Animalia
- Phylum: Arthropoda
- Clade: Pancrustacea
- Class: Insecta
- Order: Diptera
- Family: Tephritidae
- Genus: Bactrocera
- Species: B. oleae

Binomial name
- Bactrocera oleae (Rossi, 1790)

Synonyms
- Dacus oleae (Rossi, 1790); Dacus oleae var. flaviventris Guercio, 1900; Dacus oleae var. funesta Guercio, 1900; Musca oleae Rossi, 1790

= Olive fruit fly =

Species of fly

The olive fruit fly (Bactrocera oleae) is a species of fruit fly which belongs to the subfamily Dacinae. It is a phytophagous species whose larvae feed on the fruit of olive trees, hence the common name. It is considered a serious pest in the cultivation of olives.

Until 1998, the fly had not been detected in the United States, and its range coincided with the range of the olive tree in the Eastern Hemisphere: northern, eastern, and southern Africa, Southern Europe, the Canary Islands, India, and western Asia. In the Western Hemisphere, it is currently restricted to California, Baja California, and Sonora. The olive fruit fly was first detected in North America infesting olive fruits on landscape trees in Los Angeles County in November 1998. It can now be found throughout the state of California.

== History ==
In the final years of the 18th century, Italian scientist Giuseppe Maria Giovene (1753–1837), in his work Avviso per la distruzione dei vermi che attaccano la polpa delle olive (1792), provided some suggestions for peasants to effectively destroy the fly musca oleae, which infested the pulp of olive trees.

== Distribution and importance ==
This species is associated with plants of the genus Olea. It is found throughout the Mediterranean basin and in South Africa. Since the late 1990s, it has also been present in California and may have spread throughout the area of olive cultivation in the Nearctic region. It is considered the most serious pest of olives in regions where it lives, significantly affecting both the amount and quality of production in most olive-growing areas.

The impact of its attacks tends to worsen in the more humid and cooler growing areas, with significant variations depending on the variety grown, where it affects olive cultivars and areas that have hot summers and less drought.

== Morphology ==
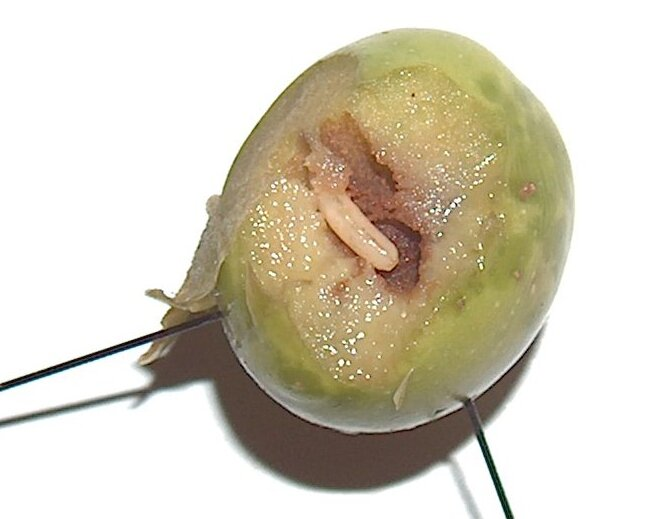
Third instar larva

The egg is around 0.7 to 1.2 mm long, elongated, and slightly flattened in its stomach, with a small, white microfleece nodule, which is important for the respiration of the embryo.

The larva is vermiform and has a conical-cylindrical, narrow front. It develops through three stages (larva, first, second and third stage). The mature larva is 6–7 mm long, white-yellowish in colour, elongated, and subconical. The front sensors are bipolar and the second conic feature, the rear sensor, has eight sensilla. The cephalopharyngeal skeleton has very short dorsal and ventral apodemes, the hypostomal scleritis is triangular. It lacks a subhypostomal and the jaws are hooked. The oral lobes have 10–12 indents, preceded on each side by a sensory plate similar to the larva of the Ceratitis capitata. The frontal stigmas have 9–10 lobes. The three larval stages can be distinguished in different ways by their cephalopharyngeal structures. The different shapes of the frontal stigmas allow determination of the larvae of the second and third stages, while the larva at its first stage is metapneustic, equipped with one pair of posterior stigmas.

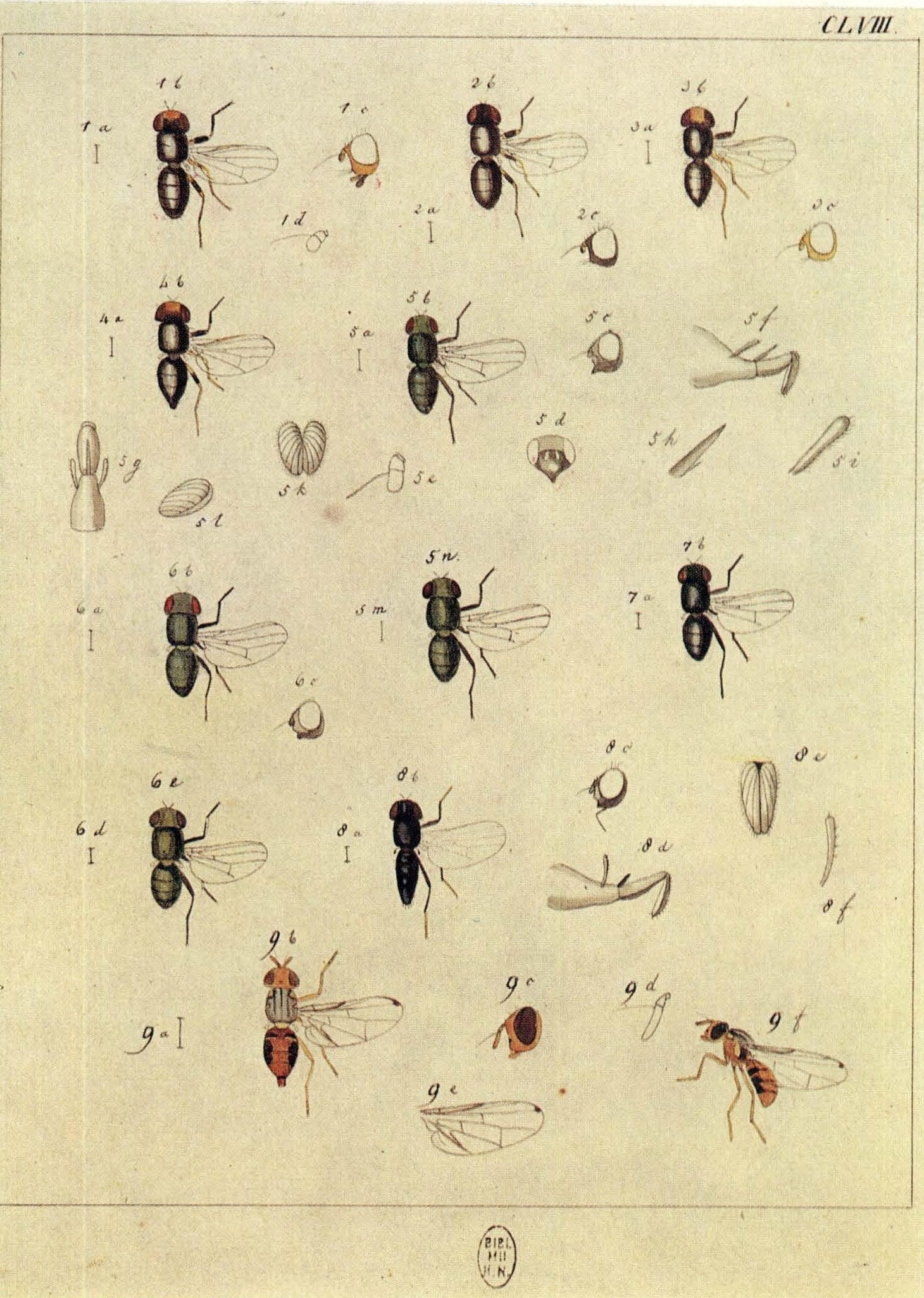
Bactrocera oleae in Europäischen Zweiflügeligen (figure 9)

The pupal stage takes place inside the puparium, an elliptical shell formed by the last exuvial transformation of the larva. The puparium is 3.5 to 4.5 mm long, varying in colour from creamy white to yellow-brown, when it is dry. The change in colour of the puparium can determine the age of the pupa.

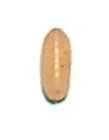
Puparium

Adults are 4–5 mm long. In Italy, they are easily recognized in conjunction with other Tephritidae for the small dark spot at the apex of the wing and the length of the narrow, elongated anal cell.

The adult male has a hardened wing at the top of the anal cell, which is longer than the female's. The third urite shows the pectorals.

The adult female has a yellowish head with two strong circular spots under the antennae close to the compound eyes, whilst the eyes are bluish-green. The chest can show various specks instead of the typical bands and lines. The mesonotum is bluish-gray with three blackish longitudinal lines. The humeral callus and areas mesopleurali, metapleurali, and mesoscutello are ivory. The wings are hyaline, with part of the pterostigma with brown specks at the apex. The abdomen is light brown with variable colourings: typically there are pairs of blackish spots on the first to fourth urotergit, which often come together in bands. The ovipositor is clearly visible, partly invaginated in the seventh urite, which is always black. The length is 4–5 mm.

In the Asian variety, the whole body of the mesonotum is yellowish with strong, visible dark lines.

== Life cycle ==
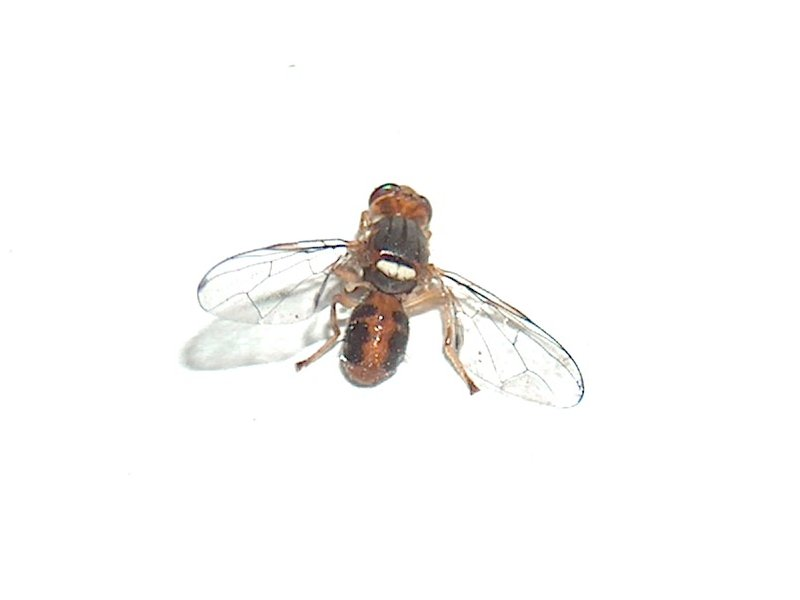
Adult (male)

The females lay their eggs in the summer when the olive is at least 7–8 mm in diameter. Egg-laying is done by making a puncture with the ovipositor into the skin of the olive, leaving only one egg in the hollow below. The bite has a characteristic triangular shape due to an optical effect. A puncture has a dark green colour, whilst older bites have a yellowish-brown colour as a result of wound healing.

Hatching occurs over a variable period depending on weather conditions: from 2–3 days in summer, to about 10 days in autumn. The newly hatched larva initially digs a tunnel on the surface, but later moves deeper into the flesh to the core, which is not affected in any way. During larval development, two changes occur, which in turn increase the size of the larva.

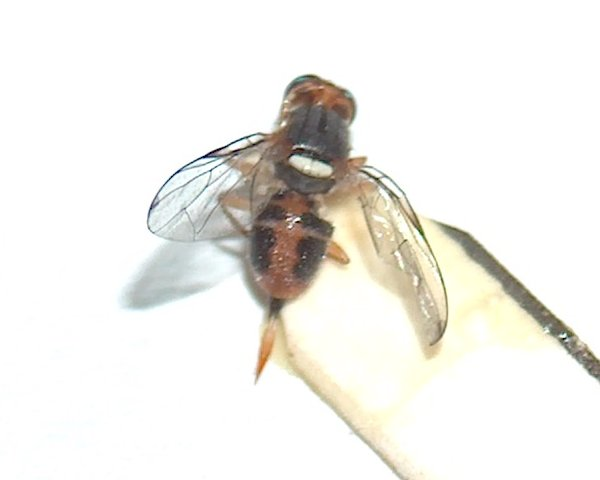
Adult (female)

Around the third change, larvae at their third stage move toward the surface and prepare the exit hole for the adult, gnawing at the flesh to leave a thin surface layer. During this phase, the olive clearly shows signs of the attack because its appears darker in conjunction with the tunneling. On the surface, a circular hole due to the remaining residual skin becomes apparent. The pupae remain dormant in the hollow below, protected within the exuviae produced by the mature larvae.

At maturity, the adult breaks the exuvia and emerges from the pupa. It breaks the skin surface left by the larva by force and leaves the exit hole. In late autumn and winter, its behaviour changes; the mature larva emerges from the olive and drops onto the ground, where pupation takes place.

Adults are glycogenic and feed primarily on honeydew. Since their basic diet is low in protein, they are particularly attracted to materials that emit volatile nitrogenous substances, such as bird droppings, for purposes of supplementing their protein requirements. This behavior is important because it can be used in programs for the fly's control and monitoring by using attractants such as hydrolysate proteins and ammonium salts.

== Environmental needs ==
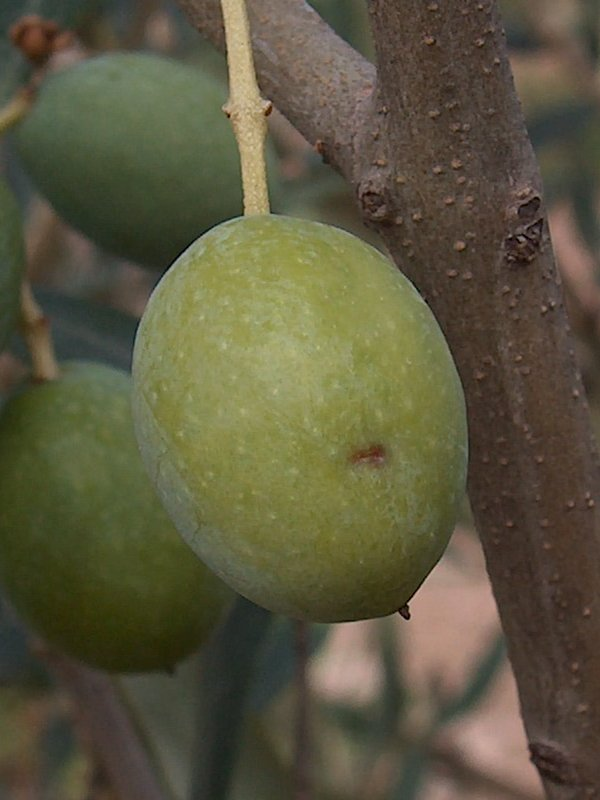
Recent puncture from an ovipositor

The development cycle is closely linked to environmental conditions, in particular the climate and the state of the olives. Knowing these parameters, together with the monitoring of the population, is needed to implement effective pest management programs.

The climate influences the cycle, especially with the temperature and less humidity. The duration of each stage is summarized below:

State	Summer	Autumn-winter
Egg	2–3 days	10 days (autumn)
Larva	10–13 days	20 days or more
Pupa	10 days	up to 4 months (hibernating pupae)
Adults	several months	

The duration of young larva therefore varies from a minimum of 20 days to a maximum of 5 months in the overwintering generation.

Temperature has an important role on the viability and rhythms of reproduction. Temperatures above 30 °C cause resorption of ovarian follicles by reducing the fecundity of females; a female lays two to four eggs on average per day in summer and 10-20 eggs in autumn. Persistent temperatures above 32 °C for several hours a day also cause mortality of over 80% of the eggs and larvae of that age.

Low temperatures, therefore, have very limited effects because its activity is undermined by temperatures below 0 °C. Given ordinary climatic conditions, low temperatures and harsh winters clearly interfere with population dynamics only in the northernmost areas of olive vegetation.

In general, the optimum temperatures for oviposition and larval development are between 20 and 30 °C, together with a need for humid weather.

The second controlling environmental factor is the obvious characteristics of the olives and the phenological stage of the plant. Females receive sensory stimuli to denote the degree of receptivity of the olive, a phenomenon that allows them to choose the olive; before oviposition, the female first "analyses" the size, colour and odour and, it seems, the presence of certain bacterial species. They are especially frequent in summer, caused by the females with a sterile puncture to test the receptivity of the olive. The ethology of the fly has been paid particularly regard in recent years when analysing study control methods based on the use of prior insect repellents (copper, kaolin, etc.).

Larval development is instead influenced by the consistency of the pulp and especially the size of drupe. In table olives, in fact, mortality of the larva is lower in summer because they can escape the lethal effects of high temperatures by migrating deeper. The consistency of the pulp is instead an intrinsic characteristic. Not even susceptibility of olive fruit fly attacks make much difference according to cultivar.

== Population dynamics ==
Population dynamics

Unlike other species, the succession of generations of the Bactrocera oleae is not markedly different for the scaling of ovipositioning and longevity of adults. Within a year, generally three to five generations occur, but in many years, a sixth generation can grow in the spring on the olive tree, but does not remain on the tree.

The population size varies throughout the year, but with two peaks: the first in the middle of spring, at the development of the winter generation of adults, and the second, more intense, in early autumn when the olives are at the highest degree of receptivity, the temperatures drop slightly and the climate becomes wetter. In Sardinia, the larval population peaks typically occur during the months of April–May and September–October.

== Predisposing factors ==
The predisposition to the flies' attacks is tied to several factors, both intrinsic and extrinsic. The main ones are climatic (temperature and rainfall), so marked differences can occur from year to year. However, other genetic or agronomic factors should not be overlooked.

Ultimately, the environmental conditions favorable to fly attacks are:

- Conditions of moderate heat, with temperatures not exceeding 32-34 °C
- A humid climate
- Premature cultivation
- Mass or dual purpose cultivation
- Cultivation under irrigation

Because of these factors, the incidence of olive fruit fly attacks increase, passing from the southern to northern areas, and coastal to inland regions. As for the season in general, the summer infestations are usually contained with the exception of cooler environment and more susceptible cultivars. On the other hand, infestation peaks happen from the months of September until cold weather arrives, especially with a rainy climate.

Another unique factor is the relationship between the alternation of production, a phenomenon in which the olive tree is particularly susceptible, and the intensity of the attacks. The attacks are usually most intense in years of low production and high production. The cause of this behaviour is partly biological, partly agricultural.

In low seasons following a high one, usually, a significant amount of olive residue is left on the plants from the previous year, so it has a higher population at its production peak in spring, and a higher reproductive potential occurring with more intense and earlier attacks. The attacked olives fall early in autumn and this causes a higher incidence of mortality during the winter.

In the subsequent good year for the population of first generation olives, production is quite low, with modest reproductive potential. The attacks will therefore be later and help a mass-production.

== Damages ==
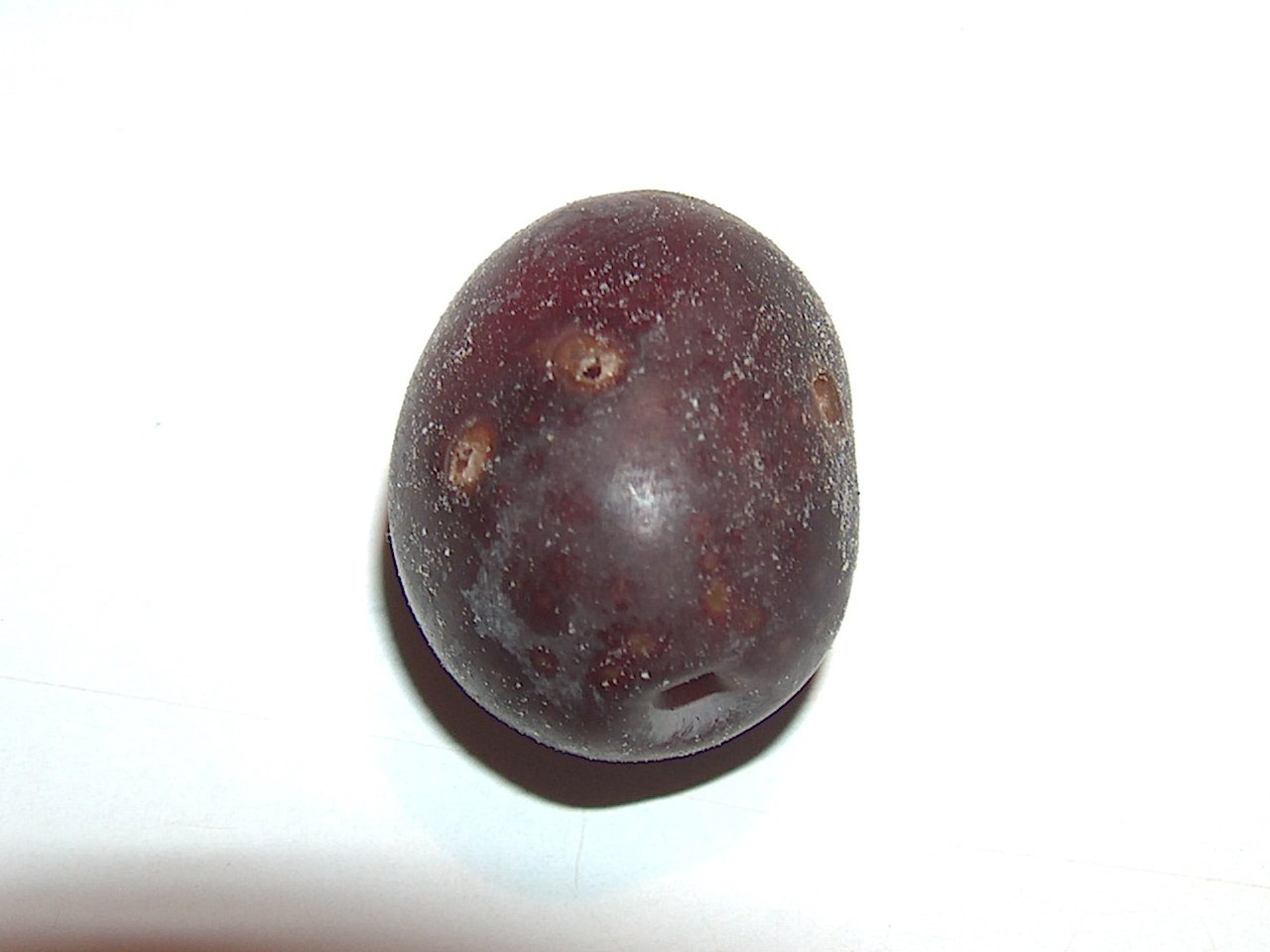
Eclosion hole

The damages caused by the olive fruit fly are of two types: quantitative and qualitative.

From a quantitative point of view, the damage is caused by larvae of second and especially third stages, by the removal of the significant proportion of the pulp which as a consequence results in reduction in the yield of olives. Part of the production is also lost due to premature falling of the attacked fruit. Olive bites and holes dug by the larvae in the initial phase do not have a significant impact on the yield. In table olives, however, the damage extends to the sterile punctures, which cause the variation in production.

A qualitative aspect to be considered is the significant deterioration in the quality of the oil extracted from olives with a high percentage of attacks by larvae of the third stage. The oil obtained from infected olives has a high acidity level (expressed as oleic acid, from 2% to 10% depending on the percentage of the infestation) and a lower shelf life as it has a higher peroxide value. Secondarily qualitative impairments of varying severity derive from the olive fruit fly attacks due to the arrival of mold through the eclosions. This deterioration in quality is evident in significantly flawed oils obtained from olives harvested from the ground or stored for several days before pressing.

== Auxiliaries antagonised by the olive fruit fly ==
Few natural enemies prey on the olive fruit fly, but they can play a significant role in containing populations in biological and integrated pest control. However, these biological factors by themselves cannot counterweigh the economic effects they cause, in particular due to the reproductive differences between flies and antagonists. In fact, they can manage the attacks of the olive fruit fly when its population is contained, but less so in the case of heavy infestations. The enemies of the fly that play a significant role are mostly parasitoids.

- Hymenoptera Ichneumonoidea
  - Opius concolor (Braconidae) is an endoparasite of various Diptera Tefritidi including B. oleae. Naturally found in the African continent, after its discovery in 1910, it was introduced in many other regions; however, it is difficult to acclimate in the Italian regions, except, perhaps, Sicily. It is used as a replacement of the larvae Ceratitis capitata (Mediterranean fruit fly).
- Hymenoptera Chalcidoidea
  - Pnigalio mediterraneus (Eulophidae) is one of the most active of the ectoparasitic larvae of B. oleae. Although polyphagous, its summer generations are usually associated with the fly.
  - Eupelmus urozonus (Eupelmidae) is another polyphagous ectoparasite associated with olives and has two or three summer generations associated with the B. oleae larva. Come autumn, it moves to another Tefritide associated with the Dittrichia. It can be used as a replacement of the fruit fly. It has a definite activity as a hyperparasite against other parasitoids of the fly.
  - Eurytoma martellii (Eurytomidae) is an ectoparasite of the B. oleae larvae, but not much information on its biology is known. In local contexts, it can become the most common antagonist of the fly.
  - Cyrtoptyx latipes (Pteromalidae) is an ectoparasite of the B. oleae larvae. It is an antagonist of minor importance, as it is rare.
- Diptera
  - Lasioptera berlesiana (Cecidomyiidae) is a predator of several insects, including B. oleae. This species contributes to containment of the first summer infestations.

== Control measures ==
=== Background ===
One of the first authors to describe the damage caused by the olive fruit fly is Girolamo Caruso, dean of the faculty in Pisa from 1872 to 1917, author of the famous monografo dell’olive. Caruso (chapter XV paragraph 14) calls the insect Dacus olea (Fabr.), providing other scientific names proposed by different authors in dialect:

- Musca oleae (Rossi, Lin., Gmelin, Fabr., Petagna, Olivier)
- Tephritis olea (Latr., Risso)
- Chiron, keirun, mouche de l'olive, the olive de ver, in southern France
- Olive fly, olive fruit fly, worm, olives, olive bug, pidocchina in various Italian regions

It follows a detailed description of all stages of the lifecycle, focusing on the larvae and the damage caused by them.

The remedies suggested are empirical. Among the undoubted merits of Caruso is that he suggested a designated control zone to farmers.

=== Chemical pest management ===
The chemical battle against the olive fruit fly can be implemented against larvae by using preventive treatments against adults.

The treatments are carried out by spraying the olive trees with insecticides (dimethoate, deltamethrin, and phosmet). Dimethoate is commonly used for its effectiveness and relatively low cost. It may be preferable because it would leave few residues in olive oil, since it is water-soluble and would pass through the amurca. In the near future, legislative authorization for the use of dimethoate is to be withdrawn. Among the products with low impact, azadirachtin is a natural repellent extracted from the fruits of the neem tree. However, its effectiveness against the olive fruit fly has not yet been sufficiently tested. Among the organic insecticide literature, rotenone is also mentioned, but the use of this active ingredient, not readily available, must be authorized by established competent bodies after demonstrating the need for it.

The larvicidal treatment is carried out according to the criteria of the scheduled pest management, pest management and integrated pest management.

Scheduled pest management usually occurs with periodic preventive treatments from the period when the larvae appear during an average infestation (from midsummer in areas with higher incidence or in September in areas with lower incidence). The treatment is repeated on average every 20 days (in the case of dimethoate) or at the interval of active use. The downside to the scheduled treatment is the risk of carrying out unnecessary treatments.

Pest management and integrated pest management is used if the problem exceeds the threshold. This can be estimated each week by noting the trend of the population of adults with the use of traps for monitoring or detecting the number of active infestation (bites and fertile mine of larvae I and II age). To be reliable, the system first requires a suitable response in the trial, because the intervention thresholds vary depending on the type of trap and the environment. In northern Sardinia, an intervention threshold – for cultivars of oil – was reliably evaluated, with a weekly catch of 10 adults per sticky trap in summer and 30 adults per trap in October. Further reliable information used is the sampling of olives to estimate the extent of infestation. In this case, the threshold for intervention of an active infestation is recommended between 10-15% on cultivars for oil production and 5% for table cultivars. Sampling is carried out weekly and taken randomly over a large area for an olive tree at head height. A sample is separated from samples of 100-200 olives, which are to detect the presence of live and uninfected eggs and larvae at first and second stages. The presence of eclosions, larvae and pupal third stages should not be counted because the damage has already occurred and the treatment would be worthless.

The preventive treatments are carried out by spraying the olive grove with poisoned protein baits. The adults, being glycogenic, are attracted by nitrogenous substances necessary to supplement their low protein diet. The substances used as bait for the flies are protein hydrolysates and are poisoned with organophosphate insecticides (usually dimethoate). The treatment should be carried out by spraying only part of the canopy of the trees, preferably the highest point nearest the sun. The intervention threshold for adulticide treatments are quite low (two or three adults per trap per week). Recently, the introduction of ready-made protein baits containing Dow Agrosciences Spinosad®biological insecticide also are authorized in organic farming.

Preventive treatments with baits have the advantage of requiring lower costs and have less environmental impact, also of preventing adult egg-laying and blocking the infestations directly. Generally, they are applied to only 50% of the canopy of plants, preferably facing south, with a diameter of 50–60 cm, with limited use of water. The main problem is they are not always effective. In general, the treatments with protein baits are effective in summer seasons in areas with low incidence, whilst from September–October, usually no larvicide treatments are needed.

Among the recent preventive measures acquired, together with the idea of pest management and integrated pest management, the treatment with copper-based pesticides has also been cited. Copper, although a pesticide, was found to exert a repellent effect against flies; the females turn their attention instead to oviposition on untreated olives. The basis for this action would be the advance biocidal effect of copper against the symbiotic bacteria, interfering with the physiology of the digestive system of the larvae. These bacteria, which appear on the surface of plants and other materials, infest adult females and transmit them to their offspring through the egg. This bacterial population would have a preferential attraction against flies, which can explain the repellent action. Repellent action would take place by kaolin, also altering the perception of the olive colour of ripening by females. Overall, these measures should not be interpreted as solution methods, including on the basis of the information on the cases, as it is still limited. Nevertheless, they are interesting because they are compatible with biological control and integrated pest management, which, therefore may play a priceless role in a strategy for integrated pest management.

=== Biological and integrated pest management control ===
Main chemical structural components of the fly's sex pheromone. The female produces both (R)-oleane and its enantiomer (S)-oleane.

Biological pest management control, carried out so far with experiments on the Opius concolor, for now, offers only partial results and in any case is particularly costly. Biological pest management controls have recently been carried out on Bacillus thuringiensis, but in this case, the biological measures showed a limited effectiveness, mainly because of difficulty reaching the larvae deep inside the fruits.

Integrated pest management is a more effective option, as it uses the measures of nature by weathering (high summer temperatures) and natural enemies. Where appropriate, integrated pest management can be assisted with the release of parasitoids in late summer. The main criteria to be taken for the integrated pest management are:

- Choosing less susceptible cultivars
- Advance of collections, particularly for susceptible cultivars
- Use of insecticides with low environmental impact, in particular, wisely used insecticides used for larvicide treatments should be excluded because they are harmful to useful insect fauna.
- Chemical treatment to be made only upon exceeding the intervention threshold
- Preventive treatment with poisoned protein baits
- Preventive treatments and repellents with copper-based products (Bordeaux mixture, copper hydroxide, copper oxychloride)
- Removal of entire production to prevent outbreaks of infestation in the spring
- Monitoring of climatic conditions
- Use of biotechnical pest management control methods

=== Biotechnical pest management ===
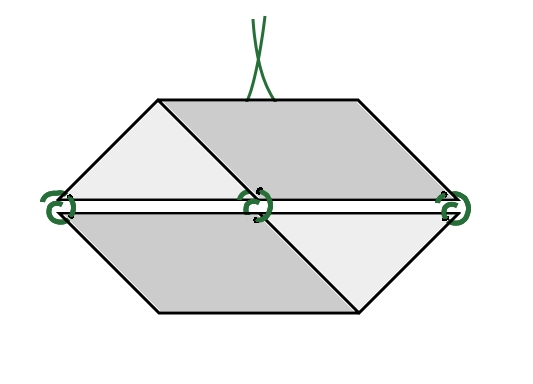
The bidirectional tower trap (pagoda type) baited with pheromone has been used in the industry for monitoring the olive fruit fly.

Biotechnical pest management is currently mostly practiced on experimental or pilot farms or as an adjunct to the use of integrated pest traps, according to the function. It can be divided into two types:

- Monitoring traps (trap-tests) are used to detect the trends of the population of adults to estimate the threshold. Their density depends on the type and how the trap is used. The traps are strewn with a sticky entomological plastic substance.
- Traps for mass trapping (trap mass) are used to capture adults in mass to remove the population to levels that keep infestations below the threshold. Their density must be high (one trap per plant with a sexual attraction and/or food).

Mass trapping has so far given results comparable to those of the chemical pest management test implemented with the protein bait and only if implemented on a large scale. It therefore pays for pest management programs in the area, while not offering excellent results if done at enterprise level, especially on limited foundations. In the 1970s, not yet having discovered the fly pheromone, mass trapping tests were carried out using yellow traps, but this technique, requiring the placement of at least five traps per plant, was discarded as uneconomic, and had a strong negative impact on useful entomofauna.

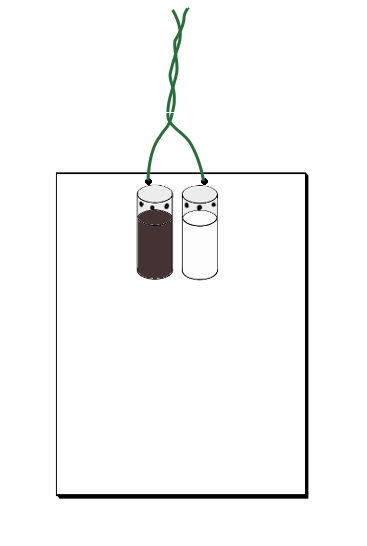
Hand-crafted chemiotropic trap, baited with food attractant, used for monitoring: made of a transparent or neutral coloured sheet of Plexiglas or acrylic glass (15x20 cm). The trap is baited with hydrolyzed protein and ammonium salt.

Until the 1990s, the traps that have offered the best results were hand-crafted, made of wood soaked in a potent and long-lasting insecticide concentrate. Among the various insecticides, the best results are obtained with deltamethrin. These traps have been carried out, mass-trapping for over a decade with about 130,000 plants in Sardinia with results comparable to those obtained with the adulticide treatments using the protein bait. Since the late 1990s, traps are commercially available on an industrial scale (Ecotrap) for the mass trapping of the olive fruit fly. The Ecotrap is triggered by using a form of double attraction: the pheromone of the olive fruit fly and the ammonium bicarbonate, with biocidal action carried out by deltamethrin. Despite the limited series of tests carried out in recent years in some areas of the Mediterranean regions, the results are judged to be positive.

Three types of attractants are used in traps:

- Colour is used for its attractiveness in sticky traps. The adult olive fruit fly is attracted to the colour yellow. Since the yellow colour is not available, these traps can only be used for monitoring purposes.
- Pheromones, for example, 1,7-dioxaspiro-5,5-undecane, which a sex pheromone emitted by the female to attract the male. Because of its selectivity, it is ideal for mass trapping, but the traps baited with the pheromone only show results that are not very effective: the pheromone of the olive fruit fly is in fact very volatile, and three to four weeks after the maximum capacity, is substantially less effective. Until the 1990s, the devices using gradual release of the pheromone proved unsuitable and it was necessary to replace them every 30–40 days.
- Food attractants are volatile nitrogenous substances that attract the flies to search for protein supplements to their diet. Protein hydrolysates and ammonium salts may be used as attractants. The disadvantage of these are that their function is affected by atmospheric conditions (temperature and relative humidity). The best results are achieved by combining a protein hydrolyzed with an ammonium salt in the same trap, or a combination of an attractive food with the pheromone.

Currently, sticky traps are the most reliable way of monitoring, as the thresholds calibrated with the traps have been extensively tested, whilst threshold assessments are still uncertain with chemiotropic traps. These are best suited, however, for mass trapping by combining two or three attractants, preferably one sexual and one food-based.

== Bibliography ==
- Delrio, Gavino; Lentini, Andrea (2003). "Difesa: Fitofagi dell'olivo". In Giovanni Bandino; Sandro Dettori (eds.). Manuale di olivicoltura (in Italian). Cagliari: Consorzio Interprovinciale per la Frutticoltura Cagliari Oristano Nuoro. pp. 229–265. ISBN 88-900601-0-7.
- Pietro Filioli (1837). "Necrologia - Giuseppe Maria Giovene - Arciprete della Cattedrale Chiesa di Molfetta". Annali Civili del Regno delle Due Sicilie. 25, gennaio e febbraio. Tipografia del Real Ministero degli Affari Interni nel Reale Albergo de' Poveri.
- Giuseppe Maria Giovene (1792). Avviso per la distruzione dei vermi che attaccano la polpa delle olive. Cannone.
