= History of the olive =

The olive is one of the oldest cultivated fruit trees on Earth, and its history is deeply intertwined with humans; it has expanded its range through human activity, reflecting the rise and fall of several civilisations. As a result, the olive has been disseminated well beyond its native range, spanning 28.6 million acres across 66 countries. Fossil evidence indicates that the olive tree had its origins 20–40 million years ago in the Oligocene, in what now corresponds to Italy and the eastern Mediterranean basin. Around 100,000 years ago, olives were used by humans in Africa, on the Atlantic coast of Morocco, for fuel and most probably for consumption. The olive was first cultivated in the Mediterranean basin between 8,000 and 6,000 years ago. Spanish colonists brought the olive to the New World in the 18th century. Olive trees were introduced to Japan in 1908 on Shodo Island in the Seto Inland Sea. It accounts for over 95% of Japan's olive production. Fifty-eight countries across five continents produce olive oil.

== Context ==
As one of the oldest cultivated fruit trees on Earth, the history of the olive is deeply intertwined with humans; its ecological success and expansion is largely the result of human activity rather than environmental conditions, with the tree's genetic and geographic trajectory directly reflecting the rise and fall of several civilisations. Owing to this relationship with humans, the olive has been disseminated well beyond its native range, spanning 28.6 million acres across 66 countries. There were an estimated 865 million olive trees in the world in 2005, of which the vast majority were in Mediterranean countries; traditionally marginal areas accounted for no more than 25% of olive-planted area and 10% of oil production.

== Origins ==
Fossil evidence indicates that the olive tree had its origins 20–40 million years ago in the Oligocene, in what now corresponds to Italy and the eastern Mediterranean Basin.

=== Human use of wild olives ===
Around 100,000 years ago, olives were used by humans in Africa, on the Atlantic coast of Morocco, for fuel and most probably for consumption. People have collected wild olives in the Eastern Mediterranean since approximately 19,000 BP; the genome of cultivated olives reflects their origin from wild (oleaster) populations in the region.

=== Domestication ===
The olive was first cultivated in the Mediterranean between 8,000 and 6,000 years ago. Domestication likely began in the Levant, based on archeological findings in ancient tombs, including written tablets, olive stones, and olive wood fragments, as well as genetic analyses. Hittite texts dating to the second millennium BC in present-day Turkey describe anointing a newborn child and mother with olive oil to protect against the dangers of childbirth. The earliest evidence for the domestication of olives comes from the Chalcolithic period archaeological site of Teleilat el Ghassul in modern Jordan. Farmers in ancient times believed that olive trees would not grow well if planted more than a certain distance from the sea; Theophrastus gives 300 stadia (55.6 km or 34.5 mi) as the limit. Modern experience does not always confirm this, and, though showing a preference for the coast, they have long been grown further inland in some areas with suitable climates, particularly in the southwestern Mediterranean (Iberia and northwest Africa) where winters are mild. An article on olive tree cultivation in Spain is brought down in Ibn al-'Awwam's 12th-century agricultural work, Book on Agriculture.

The exact ancestry of the cultivated olive is unknown. Fossil Olea pollen has been found in Macedonia and other places around the Mediterranean, indicating that this genus is an original element of the Mediterranean flora. Fossilised leaves of Olea were found in the paleosols of the volcanic Greek island of Santorini and dated to about 37,000 BP. Imprints of larvae of olive whitefly Aleurobus olivinus were found on the leaves. The same insect is commonly found today on olive leaves, showing that the plant-animal co-evolutionary relations have not changed since that time. Other leaves found on the same island date back to 60,000 BP, making them the oldest known olives from the Mediterranean.

=== Early cultivation ===
For thousands of years, olives were grown primarily for lamp oil rather than for culinary purposes, as the natural fruit has an extremely bitter taste. It is very likely that the first mechanised agricultural methods and tools were those designed to produce olive oil; the earliest olive oil production dates back some 6,500 years ago in coastal Canaan (present-day Israel). As early as 3000 BC, olives were grown commercially in Crete and may have been the main source of wealth for the Minoan civilisation.

In the 16th century BC, the Phoenicians, a seafaring people native to the Levantine heartland where olives likely were first cultivated, started disseminating the olive throughout the Mediterranean. Owing to their dominance as traders, merchants, and mariners, they succeeded in spreading the olive to the Greek isles, particularly Crete, later introducing it to the Greek mainland between the 14th and 12th centuries BC. Olive cultivation increased and gained great importance among the Greeks; the Athenian statesman Solon (c. 630 – c. 560 BC) issued decrees regulating olive planting and encouraging its cultivation, particularly for export.

The earliest evidence of the olive tree in Egypt traces back to the Eighteenth Dynasty (1570–1345 BC). Pharaoh Ramesses III (reigned 1186–1155 BC) encouraged olive cultivation; he made offerings of olive oil to the Sun God Ra.

While there is no evidence of olive cultivation in Mesopotamia, olive wood appears as early as the mid third millennium BC; the site of Emar in present-day Syria has olive wood and olive stones dating to the Middle Bronze Age (2000–1600 BC). The Code of Hammurabi, a compilation of laws and edicts made by King Hammurabi of the Old Babylonian Empire (reigning from c. 1792 to c. 1750 BC), repeatedly mentions olive oil as a key commodity. The Assyrian Empire (858–627 BC) may have expanded into the southern Levant partly to secure control over its lucrative olive oil production.

There is good evidence for the presence of the olive tree and its exploitation in Italy as early as the Neolithic, and by the Bronze Age it was cultivated and olive oil possibly produced. But from 1000 BC and then through the Roman Republic and the Roman Empire, it was distributed widely, and grown in increasingly marginal locations, reaching much of peninsula Italy, Sicily, Sardinia, and Tunisia.

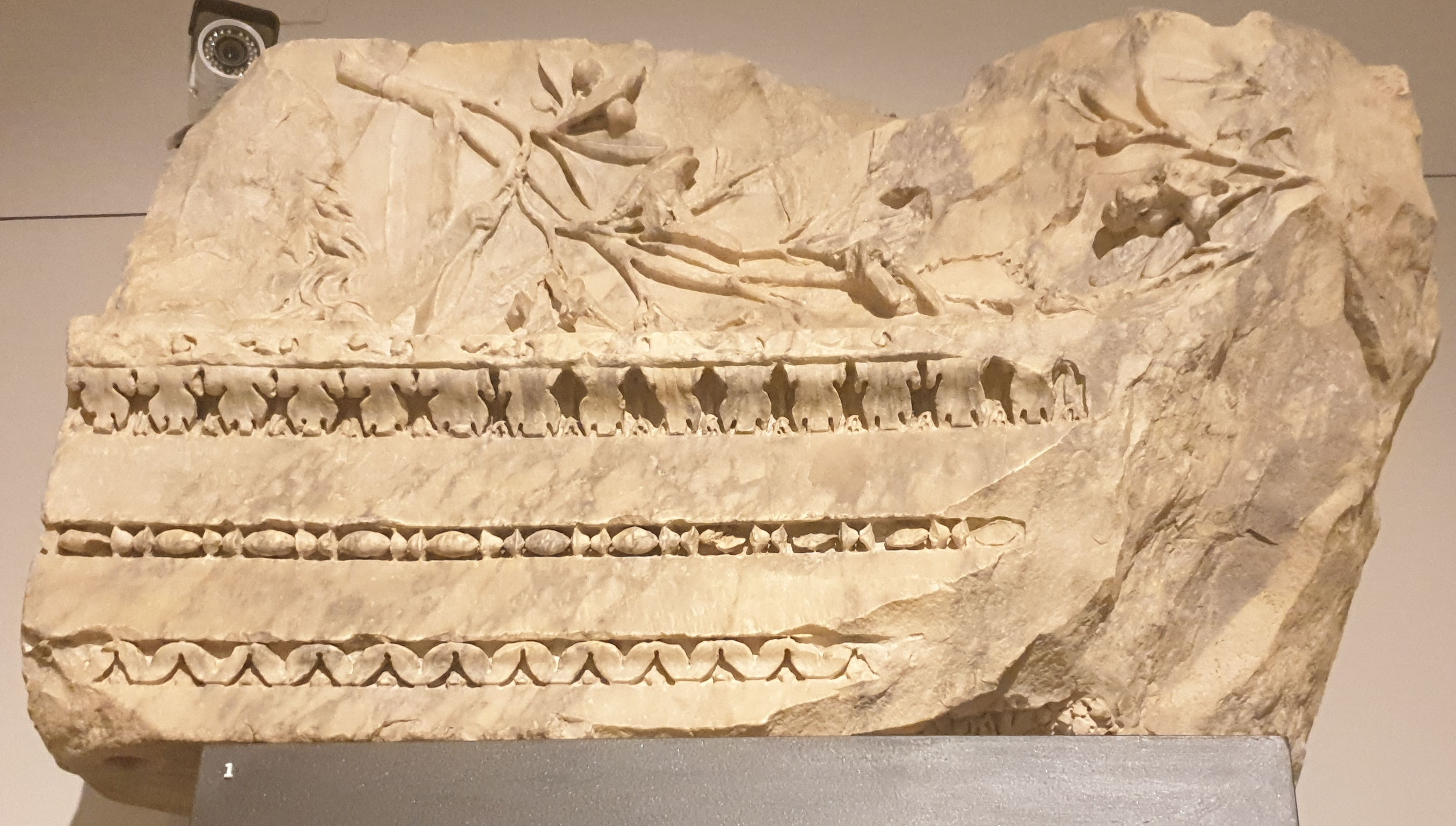
Roman architrave with frieze adorned with olive branches (c. first century AD)

Although olive growing was introduced to Spain by the Phoenicians some time in 1050 BC, it did not reach a larger scale until the arrival of Scipio (212 BC) during the Second Punic War against Carthage. After the Third Punic War (149–146 BC), olives occupied a large stretch of the Baetica valley in southwest Spain and spread towards the central and Mediterranean coastal areas of the Iberian Peninsula, including Portugal. Through the second century AD, this region would become the largest source of olives and olive oil within the empire. Olive became a core part of the Roman diet, and by extension a major economic pillar; the cultivation, harvesting, and trade in olives and their derived goods sustained many livelihoods and regions. The emperor Hadrian (117–138 AD) passed laws prompting olive cultivation by exempting individuals who grew olive trees from rent payments on their land for ten years.

The degree to which the olive benefited from the Romans is demonstrated by the significant decline in olive planting and olive oil production after the collapse of the Roman Empire. Beginning in the early eighth century AD, Muslim Arabs and North Africans brought their own varieties of olives during their conquest of Iberia, reinvigorating and expanding olive growing throughout the peninsula. The spread and importance of olives during subsequent Islamic rule is reflected in the Arabic roots of the Spanish words for olive (aceituna), oil (aceite), and wild olive tree (acebuche) and the Portuguese words for olive (azeitona) and olive oil (azeite).

== Outside the Mediterranean ==
The olive is not native outside the Mediterranean Basin, although various wild subspecies are endemic throughout Sub-Saharan Africa, southern Arabia, and central and south Asia. Beyond its immediate native range, the cultivated olive historically spread across West Asia through southwest China, and into parts of southern Egypt, northeast Sudan, the Canary Islands, and possibly the mountains of the Sahara.

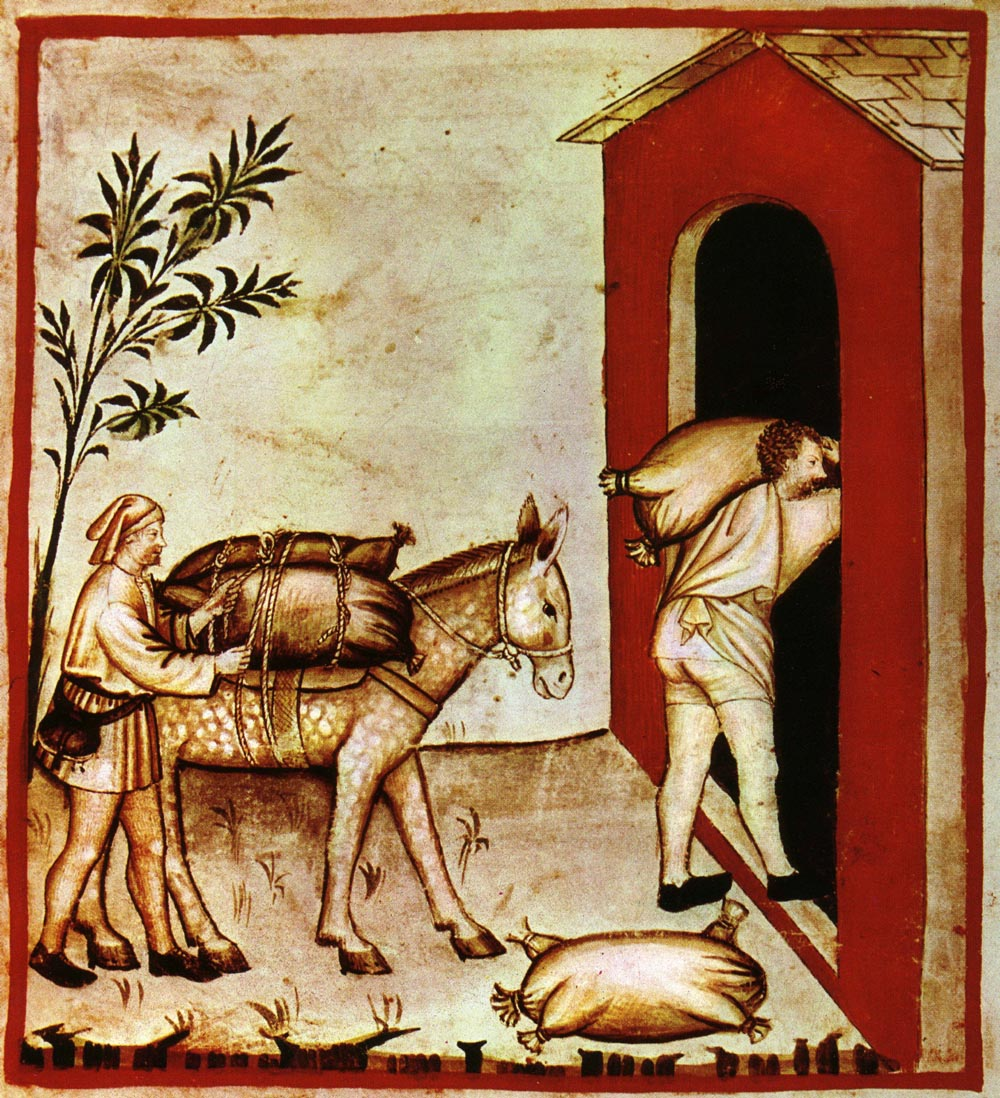
Storing olives on Dere Street; Tacuinum Sanitatis, 14th century

=== Americas ===
Spanish colonists brought the olive to the New World in the 18th century, where its cultivation prospered in present-day Peru, Chile, Uruguay and Argentina. The first seedlings from Spain were planted in Lima by Antonio de Rivera in 1560. Olive tree cultivation quickly spread along the valleys of South America's dry Pacific coast where the climate is similar to the Mediterranean.

Spanish missionaries established the olive tree in California between 1769 and 1795 at Mission San Diego de Alcalá. Orchards were started at other missions, but by 1838, only two olive orchards were confirmed in California. Cultivation for oil gradually became a highly successful commercial venture from the 1860s onward.

Olive growing in the United States is primarily concentrated in warmer regions like California, Texas, New Mexico, Arizona, Georgia, and Florida. California is by far the largest olive producer in the U.S., accounting for 95 percent of domestic olives; as of 2021, there are roughly 36,000 acres under olive cultivation in the U.S., of which about 35,000 acres are in California. However, the industry is expanding into the southeastern U.S., with Florida and Georgia experiencing growth in olive farming.

=== Asia ===
Olive trees were introduced to Japan in 1908 on Shodo Island in the Seto Inland Sea. The island has a moderate climate characterised by stable year-round temperatures and relatively low rainfall. It became the cradle of olive cultivation in Japan, accounting for over 95% of the country's production. Olives play a central role in the local culture and economy, with the island's mascot and tourism merchandise reflecting olive themes. Olive cultivation has spread to other parts Japan, namely neighboring Kagawa and Okayama Prefectures and nearby Kyushu. The vast majority of Japanese growers are small-scale farmers.

Since 2010, Pakistan has been pursuing large scale commercial olive production to reduce dependence on foreign oils. As part of the national Ten Billion Tree Tsunami Project launched in 2019, which aimed to plant 10 billion trees to mitigate climate change and environmental degradation, the Khyber Pakhtunkhwa provincial government planted thousands of olive trees. By 2020, with the help of experts from Spain and Italy, Pakistan identified 10 million acres for growing olives. The following year, the federal Ministry of Climate Change launched the Olive Trees Tsunami Project to plant nearly 10 million hectares of olive trees. In 2022, Pakistan announced its intention to join the International Olive Council. As of January 2025, the country had 5.6 million cultivated olive trees, with 500,000 to 800,000 new trees planted annually, alongside 80 million wild olive trees. Pakistan's Punjab province plans to plant 50 million olive trees on about 9.8 million acres by 2026.

Commercial olive oil production started in India in 2016, following the planting of olive saplings imported from Israel in Rajasthan's Thar Desert in 2008. Production was spearheaded by Rajasthan Olive Cultivation, a state government-funded agency that offered subsidies and incentives for growing olives, with support from Israeli experts. Olive farms continued expanding into 2020 but saw a precipitous decline in size and production volume by 2023, due to the difficult climate and declining government interest and support.

=== Global expansion ===
A 2025 report by Spain's Agrobank and the Olive Oil World Congress (OOWC) found that olive oil production increased markedly outside the European Union, with non-EU producers accounting for 40 percent of global output in 2024/2025, compared to below 33 percent in 2021/2022. Fifty-eight countries across five continents produce olive oil, with the most recent growers being El Salvador, Ethiopia, Kuwait, Uzbekistan, Azerbaijan and North Macedonia. Amid ongoing climate warming, several small-scale olive production farms have been established at fairly high latitudes in Europe and North America since the early 21st century, including in the United Kingdom, Germany, and Canada.

== In myth and legend ==
Literate Greeks recalled that the culture hero Aristaeus, originator of the arts of beekeeping, cheese-making and other innovations of the most distant past, was he who "first pressed the fruit of the oily wild-olive".

In Odyssey Book V, when shipwrecked Odysseus has been cast ashore, he finds a wild olive that had grown together with a bearing one (inosculated, in modern arboricultural terminology) on the Scherian seashore, where he crawled

Beneath two bushy olives sprung from the same root

one olive wild, the other well-bred stock
No sodden gusty winds could ever pierce them...

So dense they grew together, tangling side by side.

In the fourth century BCE, Theophrastus, the most prominent pupil of Aristotle, wrote an Enquiry into Plants, which is considered a seminal text in botany. Modern botanists often struggle to identify the plants named and described by Theophrastus, and modern naming conventions often make spurious links; notably, the modern genus Cotinus, which is named after the ancient Greek term for wild olive, kotinos, is a completely unrelated plant in the family Anacardiaceae.

Theophrastus noted the kinship of wild olive with the cultivated olive, but his correspondents informed him that no amount of pruning and transplanting could transform kotinos into olea. Through lack of cultivation, he knew, some cultivated forms of olive, pear or fig might run wild, but in the "rare" case where wild olive was spontaneously transformed to a fruit-bearing one, it was to be classed among portents. He noted that wild kinds, such as wild pears and the wild olive tended to bear more fruit than cultivated trees, though of inferior quality, but that if a wild olive was topped it might bear a larger quantity of its inedible fruits. He noted that the leaf-buds were opposite.

Timber of the wild olive was highly valued for its resistance to decay and the pest shipworm, making it ideal for shipbuilding and hand tools.

The ancient wild olive at Olympia, from which the victors' wreaths were made, had an aition, or origin myth, that was preserved in the local tradition, though the testament to it that has survived in a fragment is a late one, of the poet Phlegon of Tralles, who wrote in the second century CE. It appears that in the first five Olympiads no victor received a wreath, but before the sixth meeting for the games, the Eleans, who were hosts at that time, sent their king Iphitos to Delphi to ask of Apollo whether wreaths might be awarded. The reply came back:

Iphitos, make not the fruit of an apple the prize of thy contest;

but on the victor's head set a fruitful wreath of wild-olive,

Even the tree now girt with the fine-spun webs of a spider.

On his return to Olympia, Iphitos found that one among the grove of wild olives in the sacred precinct was wrapped in spider webs called the elaia kallistefanos. "He walled it round", as A.B. Cook says, "and wreathed the victors from its branches".

An ancient wild olive tree also gained a talismanic character at Megara, according to Theophrastus, who noted how the wood of a tree overgrows and buries within its wood a stone placed in a hole made in its trunk:

This happened with the wild olive in the market-place at Megara; there was an oracle that, if this were cut open, the city would be taken and plundered, which came to pass when Demetrius took it. For when this tree was split open, there were found greaves and certain other things of Attic workmanship hanging there, the hole in the tree having been made at the place where the things were originally hung on it as offerings. Of this tree a small part still exists.

Heracles' club was wrenched from a wild olive tree, which the city of Troezen claimed as its own, for in the late second-century CE the traveler Pausanias visited Troezen and recorded an ancient wild olive with which a local legend was entwined

Here there is also a Hermes called Polygius. Against this image, they say, Heracles leaned his club. Now this club, which was of wild olive, taking root in the earth (if anyone cares to believe the story), grew up again and is still alive; Heracles, they say, discovering the wild olive by the Saronic Sea, cut a club from it.
