= Influence of Arabic on Spanish =

Arabic influence on the Spanish language overwhelmingly dates from the Muslim era of the Iberian Peninsula between 711 and 1492. The influence results mainly from the large number of Arabic loanwords and derivations in Spanish, plus a few other less obvious effects.

== History ==
Chronological map showing linguistic evolution in southwest Europe

The Spanish language, also called Castilian, is a Romance language that evolved from the dialects of Roman Vulgar Latin spoken in the Iberian Peninsula. The first examples of language with some features specific of modern Spanish are ascribed to documents from various monasteries in the area of Burgos and La Rioja in what is now northern Spain. However Toledo, in central Spain, which became the capital of the early Kingdom of Castile during its southward expansion, is where Spanish began to appear in a written form recognizable today. The preexisting Mozarabic dialect of this region (i.e. the Romance present during Muslim rule) is therefore likely to have also had an influence on modern Spanish.

The lexical influence of Arabic reached its greatest level during the Christian Reconquista, when the emerging Kingdom of Castile conquered large territories from Moorish rulers, particularly in the 11th, 12th and 13th centuries. These territories, which included the former Taifa of Toledo, had large numbers of Arabic speakers as well as many who spoke local Romance dialects (Mozarabic) heavily influenced by Arabic, both influencing Castilian. It is possible that Arabic words and their derivatives had also already been brought into Castilian by Mozarab Christians who emigrated northwards from Al Andalus in times of sectarian violence, particularly during the times of Almohad and Almoravid rule in the 12th and 13th centuries. As such, Arabic can be considered to have had a formative influence on the Spanish language.

The degree to which the Arabic language percolated through the Iberian Peninsula varied enormously from one period and area to another and is the subject of academic debate. However it is generally agreed that in much of the peninsula Arabic was used among the local elites, both Muslims and Christians, and that the prevalent vernacular in many areas was Mozarabic, a continuum of Arabic-influenced local Romance dialects. Only the southern third of the peninsula became totally Arabized as both Mozarabic and Christianity were extinguished following the Almoravid and Almohad periods.

Much of the Arabic influence upon Spanish came through the various Arabized Romance dialects spoken in areas under Moorish rule, known today by scholars as Mozarabic. This resulted in Spanish often having both Arabic- and Latin-derived words with the same meaning. For example, aceituna and oliva (olive), alacrán and escorpión (scorpion), jaqueca and migraña (migraine), alcancía and hucha (piggy bank), ajonjolí and sésamo (sesame) etc.

The influence of the Arabized Mozarabic and of Arabic itself is more noticeable in the Spanish dialects from regions with a longer history of Moorish domination than in those where it was shorter-lived. For this reason the dialects of the southern half of the country, known collectively as castellano meridional or Southern Castilian, seem collectively to show a higher degree of preference for Arabisms. Northern Spanish dialects tend to prefer Romance synonyms to terms of Arabic origin, such as the Romance calendario v. Arabic almanaque, hucha v. alcancía, espliego v. alhucema etc. Because Canarian and all Hispanic American dialects are mainly derived from Southern Castilian, Spanish words of Arabic origin are common in most varieties of Modern Spanish.

A number of words were more recently borrowed from Moroccan Arabic, principally as a result of Spain's protectorate over Spanish Morocco in the 19th and 20th centuries, although these are of minor significance.

The Spanish spoken in the Canary Islands has also adopted a small number of words from Hassaniya Arabic, principally from Canarian sailors who fish in proximity to the Saharan coast as well as by those Canarians who returned from Western Sahara after the Green March of 1975.

== Lexical influence ==
The influence of Arabic on the Spanish language is fundamentally lexical but its other influences are also briefly examined in this article. It is estimated that there are about one thousand Arabic roots and approximately three thousand derived words, making a total of around four thousand words or 8% of the Spanish dictionary. See Influences on the Spanish language for more on how the number of Arabisms in Spanish has been estimated. The exact number of words of Arabic origin and their derivatives in Spanish is not known, and many words not included on this list are regionalisms: words that are used in certain parts of Spain and/or Hispanic America but are generally unknown elsewhere.

The high point of Arabic word use in Spanish was in late medieval times and has declined since then but hundreds are still used in normal conversation. The large majority of these words are nouns, with a number of verbs and adjectives derived direct from these nouns, e.g. alquilar (to rent) and alquilado (rented) from alquiler (rent), most of which are excluded from this list. There is also one preposition: hasta (until), and one adverb: he. There has been little influence on the basic grammatical structure of the language.

Many Arabic loanwords in Spanish start with a- or al-, where these sounds come from the Arabic article al- (giving just a- when the Arabic word begins with a solar letter). This initial a(l)- is an integral part of the word in Spanish; that is, it is not a morpheme.

Prefix	Examples in Spanish	Examples in Arabic
A-	Aceite (oil) Aceituna (olive) Azúcar (sugar)	(az-zait) الزيت (az-zay-toon) الزيتون (as-suk-kar) السكر
Al-	Almohada (pillow) Algodón (cotton) Albahaca (Basil)	(al-ma-khad-dah) المخده (al-qut-tun) القطن (al-hab-baq) الحبق

=== List of words of Arabic origin ===
This is an open list of Spanish words acquired directly from Classical and Andalusi Arabic, listed in alphabetical order. This list includes the Spanish meaning of the word as well as the Arabic etymology. No fixed standard of Arabic transliteration is used.

Rationale for inclusion

Due to the great influence of Arabic on Spanish vocabulary, this list is relatively restrictive:

- This list has been edited to include only words considered to appertain to the Spanish language and the Hispanic culture and society. Arabic words that may be understood by Spanish speakers but remain foreign to the Hispanic civilisation such as Ayatolá, Yihad and Chiita are excluded from this list.
- Only words that have passed direct from Arabic are included. Arabic words that entered the Spanish language through other, non-Iberian, Indo-European languages (such as Ayatolá, Beduino, Sofá and sorbete) are not included. Included as exceptions to this rule are álcali and álgebra, words of Arabic origin thought to have entered Spanish through "Low Latin"—as suggested by their initial stress (the Arabic definite article al- is not normally borrowed as a stressed syllable).
- Generally, only Spanish root words are listed, derivations (including nouns, verbs or adjectives) not being included. For example, aceite (from az-zeit, oil) is included but not aceitería, aceitero, aceitón or aceitoso. On the other hand, aceituna (olive) is included since it derives not from az-zeit but from az-zeituna in Arabic, even though the root of the Arabic word is the same. Aceituno (olive tree), on the other hand, would not be included, since it shares the same root as aceituna. For this reason a significant number of verbs and adjectives are excluded from this list. An exception to this rule may be made when the derived word is much more commonly used than the root word, when the meaning of the derivative has no evident connection with the root word or when it is not clear that one is derived from the other (e.g. horro and ahorrar).
- Words derived from Mozarabic are not included (Mozarabic being fundamentally a Romance language) unless the Mozarabic word is itself derived from classical or Andalusi Arabic.
- Words acquired from Berber or Hebrew (or other Afro-Asiatic languages) are not included.

The etymology and meaning of most of these words can be verified on the site of the Real Academia de la Lengua Española, although a small minority are available only in other sources or past editions of this dictionary.

Many of these words will be unfamiliar to many Spanish speakers because their use is restricted to certain regions of Spain or Spanish-speaking countries, or they are no longer in regular use. For example, the Arabic-derived word for ‘jewel’, alhaja, is very common in Mexico, whereas in Spain it is restricted to rural areas of the southern half of the country, the alternative Spanish term joya being much more common. On the other hand, the Arabic derived term for fruit juice, zumo, is the standard term in Spain, whereas in Hispanic America the Latin-derived jugo or agua are generally used. The Arabic term alberca in Spain refers to agricultural water deposits, whereas in Mexico it is the common term used for swimming pool, as opposed to piscina elsewhere or pileta in Argentina.

==== A (Ababol to Azumbre) ====
1. ababol: poppy, in Aragon, Navarre, Albacete and Murcia. From Andalusian Arabic Happapáwr, a fusion from the Arabic plural al-ḥabūb (الْحُبُوب) [ʔlħubuːb], the generic term for "seeds, beans or grains", and the Latin papāver.
2. abacero: owner of an abacería, small food shop. From Andalusi Arabic *ṣaḥb uz-zād (صاحب الزاد) "owner of supplies." [sˤaːħibu ʔlzːaːd]
3. abadí: descendant/lineage of Mohammed ben Abad, founder of the Taifa Kingdom of Seville in the 11th century AD. From Andalusi Arabic 'abbādī (عبّادي)[ʕbaːdj].
4. abalorio: cheap jewellery or jewellery beads. From Andalusi Arabic and Arabic al-ballūriy[u] (بَلْورَة) [balwra] "[made of/ like] glass or clear as crystal". Ultimately from Greek βήρυλλος, "beryl"[ʔlblwr]
5. abarraz: stavesacre (Delphinium staphisagria), a medicinal plant. From Andalusian Arabic ḥább arrás (حب الرأس) "head seeds"[ħb ʔlraːs].
6. abasí: pertaining to the Abbasid dynasty from Arabic عَبَّاسِيّ [ʕbaːsj], which overthrew the Umayyads in the 8th century.
7. abelmosco: musk seeds, an aromatic plant. From Andalusi Arabic ḥabb al musk (حب المسك) literally "musk seeds." Classical Arabic ḥabbu 'l musk[ħb ʔlmsk].
8. abencerraje: used in expression: "Zegríes y abencerrajes", "partisans of opposite interests". The Abencerrajes (in Arabic aban as-sarráǧ) was an Arabic family of the Kingdom of Granada, rivals of the Zegríes in the 15th century[bnw sraːdʒ].
9. abenuz: ebony. From Arabic abanūs (أَبَنُوس) of the same meaning but in Arabic referring to the "black wood" of the tropical tree.[ʔbnws]
10. abismal: screw in head of a spear. From Arabic al-mismar (الْمِسْمَر) "nail."[ʔlmsmaːr].
11. abitaque: a cut of wood used in construction of a certain shape and dimension. From Arabic aṭ-ṭabaqah (الطَّبَقَة) "layer" or "intermediate chamber" or "group, standard, type".[ʔltˤːtˤbaqa].
12. acebibe: raisin. From Arabic az-zabīb (الزَّبِيب) of the same meaning but also "dried grape" or "currant" [= Ribes, genus of berry plants, e.g. blackcurrant, redcurrant and white currant].[ʔlzːabjb].
13. acebuche: wild olive tree, or wood from such a tree. From Andalusi Arabic azzabbúǧ.
14. aceche: copper, iron or zinc sulphate. From Andalusi (Hispanic) Arabic *azzáj, < az-zāj, < . From Classical Arabic az-zāj (الزَّاج), meaning vitriol - sulphuric acid or a sulphate زاج [zːaːdʒ].
15. aceifa: Muslim summer military expedition. From Arabic aṣ-ṣayf (الصَّيْف), "summer"[ʔlsˤːajf].
16. aceite: oil. From Arabic az-zayt (الزَّيْت) "oil"[ʔlzːajt].
17. aceituna: olive. From Arabic az-zaytūn (الزَّيْتُون) [ʔlzjtwn] "olive"[ʔlzːajtwn].
18. aceituní: precious cloth from the Orient. From Arabic az-zaytuni, a possible adaptation of the Chinese city Tsö-Thung.
19. acelga: Chard. From Arabic as-salq (السَّلْق) of the same meaning[ʔlsːslq].
20. acémila: beast of burden; tax formerly paid in Spain. From Arabic az-zamilah "beast of burden", most likely stemming the Arabic scientific term for "pack-animal", "aḍ-ḍābatu 'l-ḥaml (الذَّابَةُ الْحَمْل)" [ʔlzːaːmila]
21. acemite: wheat husk; a type of wheat porridge. From Arabic semolina, as-samid (السَّمِيد)[ʔlsːsmjd].
22. acenefa: see cenefa.
23. aceña: watermill. From Arabic as-saniyah (السانية) "the lifter."
24. acequia: irrigation canal. From Arabic as-saqiyah (الساقية) "the irrigator"[ʔlsaːqj].
25. acerola: fruit of the trees Malpighia emarginata or M. glabra, generally found in the Americas, of the Malpighiaceae family. This should be differentiated from the European Service Rowan Tree (Sorbus domestica), family Rosaceae. From Arabic zu 'rūrah (زعرورة). Originally from Syriac za‘rārā.
26. acetre: bucket or cauldron used to extract water from a well; small cauldron used to spray holy water in Christian liturgy. From Arabic as-saṭl (السطل)[stˤl], from the latin word sitŭla.
27. aciar: (or acial): instrument used to keep farm-animals still by squeezing their ear or snout. From Arabic az-ziyār (الزِيَار) with the same meaning[ʔlzːajaːr].
28. acíbar: aloe (both the plant and its bitter juice); bitterness, grief, distaste. From Arabic aṣ-ṣabir (الصَّبِر) [ʔlsˤːsˤbir].
29. acicalar: to clean or polish (Acicalarse in reflexive form); to make oneself look good by combing, shaving etc. From Arabic aṣ-ṣaql (الصَّقْل), an instrument used for polishing things[ʔlsˤːsˤql ].
30. acicate: spurs or the spikes on spurs; incentive. From Arabic (Muzil) as-siqaT "what takes away weaknesses."
31. acidaque: Muslim dowry. From Arabic aṣ-ṣadāq (الصّداق), dowry in Islamic law.[ʔlsˤːadaːq]
32. acimut: azimuth, an astronomical concept - the angle with which the meridian forms a vertical circle which passes through a point in the globe. From Arabic as-sumut (السُّمُوت) plural of samt سَمْت.
33. ación: handle on the stirrup. From Arabic as-suyūr (السُّيُور), plural of sayr (سَيْر) "strap" or "belt"[ʔlsːiːwr].
34. acirate: line of soil used to separate different plots of land; path between two lines of trees. From Arabic aṣ-ṣirāṭ (الصِّرَاط) [ʔlsˤːiraːtˤ][ʔlsˤːiraːtˤ].
35. acitara or citara: thin wall, normally on a bridge. From Arabic as-sitārah (السِّتَارَة), wall to avoid falls - possibly from the Arabic for curtain, drapes or "hangings"[ʔlstaːr].
36. achacar: to blame. From Arabic tashakkà (اشتكى): to complain or to blame[ʔʃtka].
37. adafina: pot used by Jews to cook. It is buried in embers on Friday night, where it cooks until Saturday. From Arabic: dafina (دفينة) "buried", alternative meaning "hidden treasure"[ʔldfjn].
38. adalid: leader; general of Spanish militia. From Arabic dalil (دليل). [ʔldːljl].
39. adaraja: each of the gaps made by the bricks in a horizontally unfinished wall. From daraja (درجة)[ʔldrdʒ].
40. adarga: leather shield. From Arabic daraqa(t) (درقة) "shield."[drq].
41. adárgama: flour, rarely used today. From Arabic darmaka دَرْمَك [darmaku].
42. adarme: small portion of something; type of measurement. From Arabic dirham (درهم)[drhm].
43. adarvar: to shock. From Arabic dharb (ضرب) "blow." Replaced by pasmar and aturdir in current speech[dˤrb].
44. adarve: wall of a fortress; protection, defense. From Arabic dharb (ضرب)
45. adefera: a small, square wall or floor tile. From Arabic add-ddafeera[ʔldˤfjr].
46. adehala: that which is granted or taken as obligatory with the price in the leasing or sale of a property. From Mozarabic ad ihala and originally from Arabic ihala "offering credit.".
47. adelfa: oleander. From Arabic ad-difla (الدِّفْلَى) of the same meaning[ʔldːdflaː].
48. ademán: gesticulation which expresses the will to do something. From Arabic adh-dhamān (الضَّمَان), literally meaning legal guarantees. The change of meaning is due to the exaggerated promises and gesticulations which were offered in such a plea[ʔldˤmaːn].
49. ademe: wooden structures used to strengthen tunnels in mines. From Arabic da'm (دَعم), meaning "buttress, support, fortify, pillar, hold up". [dʕm]
50. adiafa: present or refreshment given to sailors when back from a voyage. From Arabic Diyafa (adh-dhiyāfah الضِّيَافَة) "present of hospitality", the word for "accommodation, hospitality, housing" or "hospitable reception"[ʔldˤːdˤjaːfa]
51. adivas: a disease provoking throat inflammation in animals. From Arabic aD-Dibbah "wolverine", which is the old Arabic name for this disease. Most likely the disease lupus, aḍ-ḍa'ab (الذَّأَب)[ʔlðːðʔab].
52. adive: a type of canid similar to a fox. From Arabic aḍ-ḍi'b (الذِّئْب)[ʔlðʔjb].
53. adobe: brick made from clay. From Arabic aṭ-ṭūbah (الطُّوبَة, from Coptic tôbe) of the same meaning, and from ad-dabba.
54. adoquín: paving-stone, cobble; block. From Arabic Dukkan bench of rock or wood [ʔldːukːaːn] .
55. ador: in regions where water for irrigation is restricted and shared out by local authorities, irrigation-time for each farm/field. From Arabic dawr[ʔldwr] .
56. aduana: customs house; customs. From Arabic diwaan (ديوان)[djwaːn].
57. aduar: semi-permanent rural settlement, normally used for Gypsies, Bedouins or Amerindians in South America. From Bedouin Arabic دُوَّار duwwar [dwːaːr].
58. adúcar: type of silk made from the outside of the silk-worm's cocoon. From Andalusi Arabic Haduqa[ʔldkaːr].
59. adufe: tambourine used by Spanish Muslims. Originally from Arabic ad-duff (الدُّفّ), the generic word for tambourine[ʔldːdfː].
60. adul: in Morocco, assessor of the Cadí (see under letter C, another Arabic loanword). From Arabic ‘adl (عَدْل), "honorable, trustworthy person" or "fair, impartial"[ʕadl].
61. adula: see dula.
62. adunia: (adverb) lots. From Andalusi Arabic addunya, originally from classical Arabic ad-dunyā (الدُّنْيَا) "the (whole) world", "the material world"[ʔldːdnjaː]
63. adutaque: same meaning as adárgama. From Arabic ad-duqāq (الدُّقَاق) "fine flour" or "flour meal"[ʔldːdqaːq].
64. afán: effort; desire; zeal. From afanar.
65. afanar: to steal; to work with passion. From Arabic al-fanā‘ (فناء) "extinction, extinction, destruction, vanishing", the notion, emotion of "annihilation through passion", used in poetry or to describe a type of madness[fnaːʔ]
66. aguajaque: the whitish resin of fennel. From Arabic aw-washaq "contaminated with water"[ʔlwʃq].
67. agüela: Income from interest on loans assigned in public documents; Renta de los derechos sobre préstamos consignados en documento público. From Arabic Hawalah[ħwaːl].
68. ahorro: from Arabic حُرّ (ḥurr, “free, noble, virtuous”). Same origin of horro.
69. ajabeba: Moorish flute. From Classical Arabic ash-shabbābah (الشَّبَّابَة), the generic word for "flute, clarinet"[ʔlʃːʃbːbaːba].
70. ajaquefa: Roof. Same origin as Azaquefa (see the word).
71. ajaraca: Ornamental loop in Andalusian and Arabic architecture. From Andalusi Arabic Ash-sharakah "loop".
72. ajarafe: terrace. From Classical Arabic saraf "commanding height [ʔlʃrf]
73. ajebe: Alum; Para rubber tree. From Arabic ash-Shabb[ʔlʃabː].
74. ajedrea: plant in the genus Satureja (family Lamiaceae), about 30 cm in height, with many branches and dark, narrow leaves. It is cultivated as an ornamental in gardens. From Arabic assariyya or assiriyya[ʔlʃːitˤrijːa], ultimately from Latin satureia.
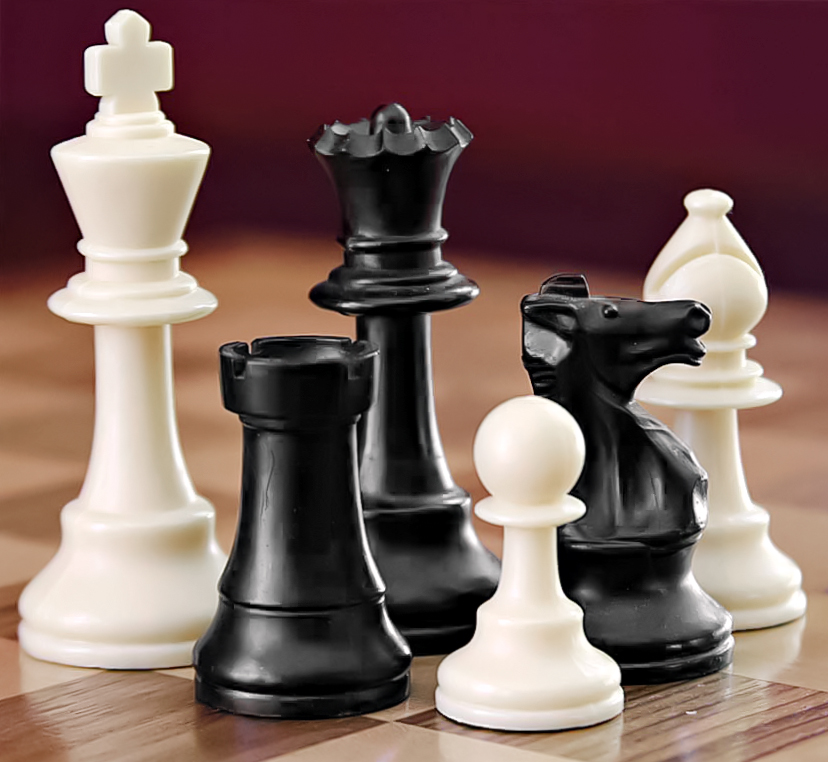
  Ajedrez, chess
75. ajedrez: chess. From Arabic ash shatranj (الشطرنج) which is from Persian Shatranj from the Sanskrit Chaturang (four armed) as was the shape of the original chess board in India[ʔlʃtˤrndʒ]
76. ajenuz: nutmeg flower or Roman Coriander (Nigella sativa). From Andalusi Arabic Shanuz and ultimately Classical Arabic Shuniz [ʔlʃːuːniːz].
77. ajimez: bifora (twin arched window); wooden salient balcony with lattice windows. From Arabic shamis[ʃms].
78. ajomate: pluricellular alga formed by very thin filaments, without knots, bright and of intense green color. It abounds in fresh waters of Spain. From Classical Arabic gumam, pl. of gumma, "luxurious hair".
79. ajonjolí: sesame; herbaceous, annual plant of the family of the Pedaliaceae, a meter high, straight stem, serrate and almost triangular leaves, white or rosy corolla, and fruit with four delicate, yellowish, oily and edible capsules and many seeds. From Classical Arabic gulgulān [dʒuldʒulaːn]"sesame." [ʔldʒuldʒulaːn].
80. ajorca: bangle; type of gold hoop, silver or another metal, used by the women to adorn the wrists, arms or the feet. From Classical Arabic shuruk الشَرَكة [ʔlʃarak], ultimately from the word shirāk "strap."
81. ajorrar: To drag, to tow. See Jorro.
82. ajuagas: equine animal ulcers. From Classical Arabic shuqaq[ʃuqaːq].
83. ajuar: dowry, a collection of household and personal items (clothes, furniture, jewelry etc...) which women in Spain traditionally prepare from a young age for the day in which they marry and move in with their husband. From Arabic shawār, "household utensils".
84. alacena: cupboard. From Classical Arabic ẖizānah (خزانة)[xzaːn].
85. alacet: foundation of a building. From Classical Arabic asas (أساس).
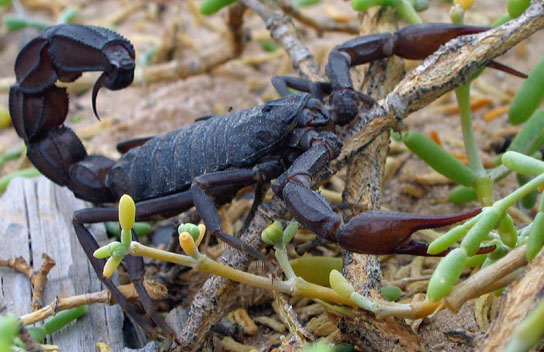
  Alacrán, scorpion
  [ʔsaːs]
86. alacrán: scorpion. From Classical Arabic aqrab (عقرب) of same meaning [ʕqrb].
87. aladar: Tuft of hair which falls on either side of the head. From Arabic idar[ʔldːaːr].
88. aladroque: Anchovy. From Andalusi Arabic Al Hatruk[ʔlraqruːq], "big mouthed".
89. alafa: wage; pay. From Classical Arabic alafah [ʔlʕifːa] "subsistence allowance." The word was replaced by sueldo in modern Spanish.
90. alafia: grace; pardon; mercy. From Andalusian Arabic al afya ultimately from Classical Arabic afiyah (عافية) "health"[ʔlʕaːfj ].
91. alahílca: tapestry to adorn the walls. Perhaps of alailaca from Andalusian Arabic ilaqa, and this of Classical Arabic ilāqah (علاقة) perhaps meaning "hanger"[ʕlaːq].
92. alajor: Tax which was paid to owners of land where buildings were built. From Arabic Ashur, period of ten days before Easter when debts were paid and alms were given.
93. alajú: Andalusian cake made of almonds, nuts, pine nuts, bread, spices and cooked honey. From al Hashu "filling".
94. alamar: A type of decorative attachment which is buttoned on clothing. From Andalusi Arabic Alam, decoration (in clothes).
95. alambique: alembic, alchemical still consisting of two vessels connected by a tube, used for distilling chemicals. From Arabic al-anbiq "the cup/container holding water", in turn from Greek.
96. alambor: Two meanings in Spanish with two different etymologies. 1) Embankment, from Andalusi Arabic Harabul "rim", from classical Arabic verb Hawwala, "to alter". 2) Type of orange tree. From Catalan l'ambor, singular of els zambors, derived from Andalusi Arabic Azzambu.
97. alamín: Village judge who decided on irrigation distribution or official who measured weights. From Arabic al-amin[ʔlʔaːmjn].
98. alamud: Steel bar used to close windows. From Arabic amud[ʕmwd].
99. alaqueca: A type of blood-coloured quartz. From Arabic 'aqiq. Currently replaced by the word cornalina[ʕqjq].
100. alárabe: Arab. From Andalusi Arabic, maintaining the definite article al arabi.العربي [ʔlʕrbj].
101. alarde/alardear: To boast/to show off. From Arabic "show" (ala?ard العرض)[ʔlʕrdˤ].
102. alarife: 1) Architect 2) Builder (in mining) 3) Astute or quick-witted person (in Argentina and Uruguay). From Arabic al 'arif: The expert[ʔlʕrːrjf].
103. alarije (uva): A type of grape. From Arabic al'aris.
104. alaroz: Crossbar which divides a window or a door. From Arabic al'arud: Obstacle placed to block entry.
105. alaroza: Fiancée or newly wed wife. From Arabic Andalusi Arabic al-arusa (العروسة), [ʔlʕarwsa].
106. alatar: Drug, spice or perfume dealer. From Arabic al attar(العطّار), [ʔlʕtˤːaːr]. .
107. alatrón: Nitrate foam. From Arabic an-nattrun.
108. alazán/alazano: Reddish cinnamon coloured, used commonly to describe sorrel-coloured horses. From Arabic al-as·hab. From Andalusian Arabic الاسهاب, from Arabic اَصْهَب (aṣ·hab, [ʔasˤhab] "reddish, reddish-brown").
109. alazor: safflower. From Arabic al-usfur.
110. albacara: Wall around a fortress, within which cattle were normally kept. From Arabic bab al-baqqara "The cattle gate/door". baqara (بقرة) means "cow" in Arabic.
111. albacea: Executor (of a will). From Andalusi Arabic Sahb al Wassiya (صاحب الوصية); "The owner of the will".
112. albacora: Albacore. From Arabic al-bakura "premature" or al-bakrah "young camel."
113. albadena: Type of tunic or silk dress. From Arabic badan: Type of shirt which covers the torso.
114. albahaca: Basil. From Arabic al-habaqah[ʔlħbq].
115. albahío: Pale yellowish colour, used commonly for cattle. From Arabic bahi: "Shining"[ʔlbhjː] (الباهية).
116. albalá: Official document. From Arabic al-bara'ah.
117. albaida: Anthyllis cystoides (Flowering plant). From Arabic al-baida: "The white one" (البيضاء) [ʔlbjdˤaːʔ]..
118. albanega: 1) Net used for hair. 2) Rabbit trap. From Arabic al-baniqa.
119. albañal: Sewer. From Andalusi Arabic al-ballá: "swallower".
120. albañil: Construction worker. From Andalusi Arabic al-banni. Originally from classical Arabic banna[ʔlbnːaːʔ].
121. albaquía: The remainder. From Arabic al-baqi (الباقي) of the same meaning[ʔlbqj].
122. albarán: Invoice. From Arabic al-bara'ah[ʔlbraːʔ].
123. albarazo: Vitiligo. From Andalusi Arabic Al-Barash[ʔlbrsˤ].
124. albarda: Packsaddle. From Arabic al-barda'ah[ʔlbrdʕ].
125. albardán: Clown or fool. From Andalusi Arabic albardán: "insolent". Originally from Classical Arabic bardan: "Idiot (cold headed)"[ʔlbrdaːn].
126. albardín: Plant endemic to the Spanish steppes, similar in nature and use to Esparto. From Arabic "al-bardi": "papyrus"[ʔlbrdj].
127. albaricoque: Apricot. From Arabic al-barqouq (البرقوق) "plum" or "early-ripe."
128. albarrada: 1) Clay vase, see alcarraza. 2) Stone wall. From Arabic al-barradah: "the cooler".
129. albarrán: 1) Farm boy 2) Shepherd 3) Person with no fixed residence. From Andalusi Arabic al-barrani: "Outsider".
130. albatoza: Small, covered boat. From Arabic al-gattosha: grebe. Due to the Arabic custom of giving names of birds to vessels.
131. albayalde: Cerrusite. From Arabic al-bayad[ʔlbjaːdˤ].
132. albéitar: Vet. From Arabic al-baytar[ʔlbjtˤaːr].
133. albenda: Decorated white linen. From Arabic al-band.
134. alberca: Water deposit for irrigation. In Mexico and Honduras it is also the term of choice for swimming pool. From Arabic al-birka (البِركة) "pond"[ʔlbrk].
135. albérchigo: Apricot tree. From Andalusi Arabic al-bershiq.
136. albihar: Mayweed. From Arabic al-bahar.
137. albitana: 1) Fence to protect plants in gardening. 2) Prolongation of the keel or stern post of a ship. From Arabic al-bitana.
138. alboaire: The craft of decorating churches and domes with "azulejos". From Andalusi Arabic al-buhaira: lagoon.
139. albogue: Single-reed clarinet used in Spain. From Arabic al-bûq (البوق): The horn or the trumpet[ʔlbwq].
140. alboheza: Malva, from Andalusi Arabic al-hubayza[ʔlxbjz].
141. albohol: Morning glory, from Andalusi Arabic al-hubuul: "rope".
142. albollón: Drainage or sewage. From Mozarabic Ballaón and ultimately from Classical Arabic balla'ah.
143. albóndiga: Meatball; ball. From Arabic al-bunduqa (البندقة) "the ball," from Greek (κάρυον) ποντικόν (káryon) pontikón, "Pontic [nut]"[ʔlbndq].
144. albórbola: Joy, celebratory noise. From Arabic walwalah.
145. alborga: Matweed sandal. From Arabic albúlḡa[ʔlbrɣ].
146. albornía: A type of large vase. From Arabic barniya[brnj].
147. albornoz: Bathrobe. From al-burnos (البرنس); "(bath)robe"[ʔlbrnws].
148. alboronía: A type of Andalusian vegetable stew. From Arabic al buranniya "Buran's (stew)." Buran was the wife of Caliph Ma'moun.
149. alboroque: 1) A present or gratuity given in exchange for a service. 2) The kind treatment and lavish attention offered and received in anticipation of a commercial transaction. From Andalusi Arabic al-borok, possibly ultimately from Classical Arabic arbun.
150. alboroto: Riot, joy. Comes from arabism alborozo (joy), from andalusí Arabic al-burúz derived from Classical Arabic al-burūz, "military parade previous to a campaign"; or related to Latin volutāre.
151. alborozo: Extreme chaos or happiness. From Andalusi Arabic al-buruz: "Military parade prior to an expedition".
152. albotín: Turpentine Tree. From Arabic butm of the same meaning[ʔlbutˤm].
153. albricias: 1) Term used to congratulate someone. 2) Present or gift provided to a bringer of good news. From Arabic bushra[ʔlbʃaːr].
154. albudeca: A bad watermelon. From Andalusi Arabic al batiha[ʔlbtˤjx].
155. albufera: Lagoon. From Arabic al buhaira(البُحيرَة)[ʔlbuħjra]..
156. albur: This term has a wide range of meanings: 1) Flathead mullet (Spain and Cuba), 2) A card combination in a card game known as Banca, 3) A chance occurrence on which an enterprise hedges its bets, 4) An expression which has a double or hidden meaning (Mexico and Dominican Republic) 4) An amorous affair (Nicaragua), 5) A lie, slander or rumour (Puerto Rico and Honduras). From Arabic al-boori[ʔlbwrj].
157. alcabala: 1) A tax on commercial transactions. 2) Police checkpoint outside cities and on main roads (Colombia and Venezuela). From Andalusi Arabic al qabala[ʔlqbaːl].
158. alcabor: Hollow interior of a chimney or oven. From Arabic al qabw[ʔlqbw].
159. alcabtea: A type of linen. From Arabic al qubtiya, meaning "Egyptian" or "Coptic"[ʔlqbtˤj].
160. alcacel or alcacer: 1) Green barley 2) A barley field. From Arabic al qasil[ʔlqsˤjl].
161. alcachofa: Artichoke. From Arabic al-ẖarshoof of the same meaning.
162. alcaduz: Water pipe. From Arabic Qâdûs (قادوس) meaning "water-wheel scoop"[ʔlqaːdws].
163. alcafar: Limbs of a cuadruped (normally a horse). From Arabic al kafal[ʔlkfl].
164. alcahaz: Birdcage. From Arabic qafaṣ (قفص) [ʔlqafasˤ] of the same meaning.
165. alcahuete: Accomplice, pimp, a person who helps another in a love affair, specially an illicit one; gossipy person. Alcahuete comes from Hispanic Arabic alqawwad (the messenger), and this from Classical Arabic qawwad (القوَّاد) [ʔlqwːaːd]. This "messenger" carried messages to a married woman's lover. By extension it became commonly known as any person who sets up a love affair, generally illicit.
166. alcaicería: an establishment where silk farmers presented their produce, under the rights reserved to the Muslim rulers in Granada and other towns of the Nasrid Kingdom. From Andalusi Arabic Al-Qaysariya, originally from the Latin Caesarea[qjsaːrj].
167. alcaide: a term historically referred to various positions of government authority. In modern Spanish commonly refers to a prison warden. From Arabic al qa'id(القائد) [ʔlqaːʔjid], "military commander".
168. alcalde: Mayor. From Arabic al-qadi (the judge). Qadi comes from the verb qada (to judge)[ʔlqaːdˤj].
169. álcali: Alkali. From Arabic qalawi (قلوي) of the same meaning thru Medieval Latin.
170. alcaller: Clay artisan or his helper. From Andalusi Arabic al qallal[ʔlqlaːl].
171. alcamiz: An obsolete term referring to a list of soldiers. Its etymology is an erroneous transmission of at-taymiz, "Military inspection" in Andalusi Arabic and "Distinction" in Classical Arabic.
172. alcamonías: Seeds used in spice mixes such as anisseed or cumin. It is also a now obsolete expression referring to the act of hiding things. From Arabic kammuniya(الكَمّون) [ʔlkamːwn], a cumin-based concoction.
173. alcana: Henna or Henna tree. From Arabic, hinna[ʔlħinːaːʔ ].
174. alcaná: Commercial street or neighbourhood. From Arabic القناة qanaah: "Drains or water pipes"[ʔlqnaː].
175. alcancía: Clay money box, penny or piggy bank. From Andalusi Arabic alkanzíyya, derived from classical Arabic kanz: "treasure"[ʔlknzjːa].
176. alcándara: Hook used to hang clothes or fowl. From Arabic Kandarah.
177. alcandía: Sorghum. From Andalusi Arabic qatniyya.
178. alcandora: A type of shirt. From Arabic qandura.
179. alcanería: A rural term for a type of artichoke. From Andalusi Arabic al-qannariya, an Arabic rendering of the Latin cannaria.
180. alcanfor: Camphor. From Andalusi Arabic Al-Kafur.
181. alcántara/alcantarilla: Drain. From Arabic al-qantarah meaning "bridge"[ʔlqntˤr].
182. alcaparra: Caper. From Andalusian Arabic al-kaparra. Via Latin and Greek.
183. alcaraván: Stone-Curlew. From Andalusian Arabic al-karawan.
184. alcaravea: Caraway. From Andalusi Arabic al-Karawiya.
185. alcarceña: Name given to the Ervil and the Carob. From Andalusi Arabic al-kershana, meaning "the big bellied", due to the plants causing a swelled stomach when consumed in large quantities.
186. alcarraza: A type of clay container similar to a Spanish Botijo. From Andalusi Arabic al-karraza. Ultimately from Persian Koraz.
187. alcarria: Of uncertain Arabic etymology. Refers to a flat highland with little vegetation.
188. alcatenes: A type of medicine which is mixed with copper sulfate to treat ulcers. From Arabic al-qutn.
189. alcatara (or alquitara): Alembic. From Arabic root for the verb "to distill" qattara[ʔlqtˤːaːr].
190. alcatifa: An obsolete term for a thin carpet or underlay for carpet. From Arabic al-qatifa[ʔlqtˤjf].
191. alcatraz: Cormorant. From Arabic القطرس al-qaṭrās, meaning "sea eagle".
192. alcaucil: Artichoke. From Spanish Andalusi Arabic alqabsíl[a], that comes from Mozarab diminutive kapićéḻa, and this from Spanish Latin capĭtia, "head". Standard Latin, caput-itis.
193. alcaudon: Shrike. From Andalusi Arabic al-kaptan.
194. alcavela/alcavera: Mob, herd, family, tribe. From Arabic al-qabila.
195. alcayata: Metallic hanger or hook. From Andalusi Arabic al-kayata, originally from Latin Caia
196. alcazaba: Palace. From Arabic al-qasbah, (قصبة), "the quarter"[ʔlqsˤb].
197. alcázar: Citadel; palace. From Arabic al-qasr (القصر) "the citadel," from Latin castrum, "castle," same etymology with Spanish term castro[ʔlqsˤr].
198. alcazuz (or orozuz): Liquorice. From Arabic ‘urúq sús or ‘írq sús, and from classic Arabic irqu [s]sús.
199. alcoba: Alcove. From Arabic al-qubba (القُبَّة) [ʔlqubːa] "the vault" or "the arch".
200. alcohela: Endive. From the Andalusi Arabic alkuḥáyla, and this one from the Arabic kuḥaylā'.
201. alcohol: From Arabic al-kuhul (الكحول), fine powder of antimony sulfide used as eye makeup. Derivate word: alcoholar.
202. alcolla: Large glass bulb or a Decanter. From Hispanic Arabic alqúlla, and this one from the Arabic qullah.
203. alcor: Hill. From Hispanic Arabic alqúll, and this one from the Latin collis.
204. alcora
205. alcorcí
206. alcorque
207. alcorza
208. alcotán
209. alcotana
210. alcrebite
211. alcuacil
212. alcubilla
213. alcuña
214. alcuza
215. alcuzcuz
216. alchub
217. aldaba
218. aldea/aldeano: Village / Villager.
219. aldiza
220. alefriz
221. aleja
222. alejija
223. alema
224. alerce
225. aletría
226. aleve/alevoso/alevosía: from Hispanic Arabic al'áyb and the latter from Classical Arabic áyb, "defect, blemish, or smudge of infamy"[ʕajb]
227. aleya
228. alfaba
229. alfábega
230. alfadía
231. alfaguara: Geyser. From Arabic fawwâra (فوارة): "spout, fountain, water jet"[ʔlfawːwaːra].
232. alfahar/alfaharería
233. alfaida
234. alfajeme
235. alfajor: Sweet almond shortbread. From Spanish Arabic fašúr, and this from Persian afšor (juice).
236. alfalfa: alfalfa hay. From Hispanic Arabic alfáṣfaṣ[a], from Classical Arabic fiṣfiṣah, and this from Pelvi aspast.
237. alfaneque: 1) A type of bird, from Arabic al-fanak [fanak] 2) A tent, from Berber afarag.
238. alfanje: A type of sword. From Arabic al-janyar "dagger".
239. alfaque
240. alfaqueque
241. alfaquí
242. alfaquín
243. alfaraz
244. alfarda: Two meanings; from Arabic al-farda and from Arabic al-fardda.
245. alfarero: potter.
246. alfardón
247. alfareme
248. alfarje
249. alfarrazar
250. alfaya
251. alfayate
252. alfazaque
253. alféizar: Window ledge. From Arabic al-hayzar, "The one which takes possession".
254. alfeñique: 1) Weakling. 2) A type of sweet consumed in Spain and Mexico. From Andalusi Arabic Al-Fanid. Ultimately from Persian and Sanskrit.
255. alferecía
256. alferez
257. alferraz
258. alferza: Piece, known as Vizir in other languages, corresponding to the modern chess "queen" (though far weaker), from which modern chess developed in medieval Spain. From Andalusi Arabic Al Farza, ultimately from Persian Farzan, "the guardian".
259. alficoz
260. alfil: Bishop, in chess. From Arabic al-fiyl (الفيل) [ʔlfiːl] "The elephant."
261. alfilel/alfiler
262. alfinge
263. alfitete
264. alfiz
265. alfolí
266. alfombra: Carpet. Two meanings; from Arabic al-jumra and from Arabic al-humra.
267. alfóncigo: Pistachio. From Arabic al-fustuq [ʔlfustuq].
268. alfóndiga
269. alforfón
270. alforja: Saddlebag. From Arabic al-khurj ( الخرج ) "saddle-bag", portmanteau[ʔlxurdʒ].
271. alforre
272. alforrocho
273. alforza
274. alfóstiga
275. alfoz: Neighborhood, district. From Arabic hauz (حوز) meaning "Precinct" or "City limits"[ħawz].
276. algaba
277. algadara
278. algaida
279. algalaba
280. algalia
281. algalife
282. algar
283. algara
284. algarada
285. algarabía: Incomprehensible talk; gabble; gibberish. From Arabic al-'arabiya: "Arabic"[ʔlʕrbj].
286. algarivo
287. algarazo: Short rainstorm. From Arabic al 'ard: "cloud".
288. algarrada
289. algarrobo: Carob. From Arabic al-kharouba "the carob"[ʔlxrːrwb].
290. algavaro
291. algazafán
292. algazara
293. algazul
294. álgebra: Algebra. From Latin algebræ from Arabic al-jabr, meaning "completion, rejoining", from the name of al-Khwarizmi's book Hisab al-jabr w’al-muqabala "The Calculus of Completion and Equality."
295. algodón: Cotton. From Arabic "al-qúţun (قطن)", meaning "The cotton", "Egyptian", "Coptic".
296. algorfa
297. algoritmo: algorithm, comes from the Latin word algobarismus, influenced by the Greek word arithmos "number". The persian name of Muhammad ibn Musa al-Khwarizmi, محمد بن موسى الخوارزمي, famous mathematician, through its Latinized prounuciation Algorithmi.
298. algorza:
299. alguacil: Sheriff. From Arabic "al-wazîr (الوزير)", meaning "Minister".
300. alguaquida: fuel for a fire. From Arabic waqîda (وقيدة) meaning "Fuel"[ʔlwqjd]
301. alguaza: Window or door hinge.From Arabic wasl "juncture".
302. alhadida: From Arabic "al-hadida" (الحديدة)[ʔlħadiːda], meaning Copper sulfate.
303. alhaite: Jewel. From Arabic al hayt "string". الخيط [ʔlxajtˤ]
304. alhaja: Jewel. From Arabic al-hajah "the valuable thing." الحاجة [ʔlħaːdʒa]
305. alhamar: Red mattress or bed cover. From Arabic hanbal, "fur bedcover". Also from Arabic Alhamar [ʔlʔaħmar]/ Al-Ahmar "red".
306. alhamel: Beast of burden or human porter, in Andalusian Spanish. From Arabic hammal. الحامل، حمّال[ʔlħaːml]
307. alhamí: Stone bench normally covered with azulejos. Refers to the Grenadine town of Alhama.
308. alhandal: Colocynth. From Arabic Alhandhal. الحنظل [ʔlħanðˤal]
309. alhanía: 1) Bedroom 2) Cupboard 3) A type of small mattress. From Andalusi Arabic al haniyya, "alcove".
310. alhaquín: Weaver. From Arabic plural Al Hayikeen, "weavers". الحيّاكين[ʔlħjaːkjn]
311. alharaca: Violent reaction to a small issue. From Arabic haraka. حركة [ʔlħaraka]
312. alhavara: Flour. From Arabic huwara.
313. alhelí: Aegean Wallflower. From Arabic hiri.
314. alheña: Spanish word for Henna and the plant from which it is derived.
315. alholva: Fenugreek. From Arabic hulbah. [ʔlħilba]
316. alhorí: Same meaning and etymology as more commonly used term alfolí.
317. alhorre: 1) Feaces of a newborn child. From Arabic hur, "feaces". 2) Common skin rash in babies, nappy rash. Commonly used in expression "Yo te curaré el alhorre!" when threatening to beat a child. From Arabic shakatu el hurr, "skin infection".
318. alhorría: (or ahorría): Expression used for when a slave is freed. From Arabic al-hurriya, "freedom".
319. alhucema: Lavender. From Arabic huzama[ʔlxuzaːmaː].
320. alhuceña: Woodruff. From Arabic uhshina.
321. aliara: Drinking horn. From Andalusian Arabic al fiyara.
322. alicante: Vernacular name of two different types of poisonous snakes present in Spain and Northern Mexico respectively. From Arabic al aqrab, "scorpion".
323. alicatar: To till. From Arabic qat, "to cut".
324. alicate: Pliers. From Arabic laqaat, "tongs".
325. alidada: Alidade. From Andalusian Arabic al'idada [ʔlʕidˤaːda].
326. alifa: Sugar cane, two years old, in Andalusian and Mexican Spanish. From Arabic halifa [xaliːfa] "successor".
327. alifafe: 1) Light indisposition. 2) Type of tumor which develops on the legs of horses from excessive work. From Arabic ifash "sowing bag".
328. alifara
329. alijar
330. alimara
331. alioj
332. alirón
333. alizace
334. alizar
335. aljaba
336. aljabibe
337. aljama
338. aljamía/aljamiado: Medieval Romance Spanish or Mozarabic written in Arabic script.
339. aljaraz
340. aljarfa
341. aljébana
342. aljerife from arabic شريف [ʃariːf]
343. aljez
344. aljibe from Andalusian Arabic اَلْجُبّ (al-júbb), from Classical Arabic جُبّ (jubb, “cistern, well”)
345. aljófar/aljofarar from Arabic جَوْهَر (jawhar), via Andalusian Arabic, from Persian گوهر (gowhar, “pearl”). The same origin of Johor, Malaysian state.
346. aljofifa
347. aljor (or aljez)
348. aljuba
349. aljuma
350. añagaza
351. almacabra
352. almacén: Deposit, dry goods store. From Arabic al-majzan of makhzan (المخزن) [ʔlmaxzan] "the storage" or "the depot."
353. almacería
354. almáciga
355. almadén
356. almádena: sledgehammer. From Andalusian Arabic al-māṭana (الْمَاطَنَة) "sledgehammer."
357. almadía
358. almadraba: Tuna fishing in Andalusia and particularly in the province of Cádiz. From Andalusi Arabic Al-madraba[ʔlmadˤraba], "place where to hit", in reference to the fishing technique.
359. almadraque
360. almagazén
361. almagra
362. almahala
363. almaizar
364. almaja
365. almajaneque
366. almajar
367. almajara
368. almalafa
369. almanaque: almanac (see etymology section in the article for further discussion). From Andalusian Arabic almanáẖ "calendar", from Arabic munāẖ "caravan stop", or from Greek almenichiakon "calendar."
370. almancebe: type of river fishing net, from Spanish Arabic al-manṣába, bank.
371. almarada
372. almarbate
373. almarcha
374. almarjo
375. almarrá
376. almarraja or almarraza
377. almártaga: two meanings, from al-marta'a and al martak.
378. almástica
379. almatroque
380. almazara: Olive press. From Arabic "al-ma'sarah" (المعصرة)[ʔlmaʕsˤara], "juicer".
381. almazarrón
382. almea: two meanings, from almay'a عالمية [ʕaːlmj] and alima. الميعة [ʔlmjʕ]
383. almejía
384. almenara: two meanings, from al-manara [ʔlmanaːra] and al-minhara.
385. almez
386. almíbar: sugar syrup, juice concentrate.
387. almicantarat
388. almijar
389. almijara
390. almijarra
391. almimbar
392. alminar
393. almiraj/almiraje/almiral
394. almirez
395. almirón: Dandelion. From Andalusian Arabic al mirun.
396. almizate
397. almizcle/almizque
398. almocadén
399. almocafre
400. almocárabe
401. almocela
402. almocrebe
403. almocrí
404. almodón
405. almófar
406. almofariz
407. almofía
408. almofrej/almofrez
409. almogama
410. almogávar
411. almohada: Pillow, from Arabic al-makhada (المخده) [ʔlmixadːa] with the same meaning.
412. almoharrefa
413. almohaza
414. almojábana
415. almojama: see mojama
416. almojarife
417. almojaya
418. almona
419. almoneda: Sale or auction. From Arabic munadah[ʔlmunaːdaː].
420. almoraduj/almoradux
421. almorávide
422. almorí
423. almoronía: see alboronía.
424. almotacén
425. almotalafe
426. almotazaf/almotazán
427. almozala/almozalla
428. almud
429. almuédano
430. almuerzo: Lunch. Arabic al- + Latin morsus (bite).
431. almunia: an agricultural settlement, from المُنية [ʔlmunja] meaning desire. (see Article in Spanish).
432. alpargata
433. alpechín
434. alpiste
435. alquería: Farmhouse. From Arabic القرية [al-qaria]) "the village."
436. aloque
437. aloquín
438. alpargata
439. alquequenje
440. alquermes
441. alquerque: Two meanings, from al-qirq and al-qariq. القرق [ʔlqrq]
442. alquez
443. alquezar
444. alquibla
445. alquicel
446. alquiler: Rent. From Arabic Al kira' (الكراء)[ʔlkiraːʔ]
447. alquimia: alchemy, from Arabic al-kīmiyā' (الكيمياء or الخيمياء) via Medieval Latin alchemia, from the Late Greek term khēmeía (χημεία), also spelled khumeia (χυμεία) and khēmía (χημία), meaning 'the process of transmutation by which to fuse or reunite with the divine or original form'.
448. alquinal
449. alquitira
450. alquitrán: tar, from Arabic اَلْقِطْرَان al-qitran. [ʔlqatˤraːn]
451. alrota
452. altabaca
453. altamía
454. altramuz: Lupin bean. From Arabic at-turmus [turmus].
455. alubia: Pea, bean. From Arabic lubiya[luːbjaːʔ].
456. aludel
457. aluquete/luquete
458. alloza
459. amán
460. ámbar: amber, from Arabic ʿanbar عنبر, meaning "anything that floats in the sea", via Middle Latin ambar.
461. ámel
462. amín
463. amirí
464. anacalo
465. anacora
466. anafaga
467. anafalla/anafaya
468. anafe
469. anaquel
470. andorra
471. andrajo
472. anea
473. anejir
474. anúteba
475. añacal
476. añacea/añacear
477. añafea
478. añafil
479. añagaza
480. añascar
481. añazme
482. añil: Ultimately from Sanskrit nilah, "dark blue".
483. arabí
484. arancel
485. arbellón/arbollón
486. archí
487. argadillo
488. argamandel
489. argamula
490. argán
491. argel
492. argolla
493. arguello/arguellarse
494. arije
495. arimez
496. arjorán
497. arnadí
498. arrabá
499. arrabal
500. arracada
501. arráez
502. arrayán
503. arrecife
504. arrejaque/arrejacar
505. arrelde
506. arrequife
507. arrequive
508. arriate
509. arricés
510. arroba
511. arrobda
512. arrocabe
513. arrope
514. arroz: Rice [ʔaruzː].
515. áscar/áscari
516. asequi
517. asesino: Assassin. From Arabic hashshashin "someone who is addicted to hashish (marijuana)." Originally used to refer to the followers of the Persian Hassan-i-Sabah (حسن صباح), the Hashshashin.
518. atabaca
519. atabal
520. atabe
521. atacar: To tie, to button up. From Andalusi Arabic tákka, originally from classical Arabic tikkah[tikːa], ribbon used to fasten clothes.
522. atacir
523. atafarra/ataharre
524. atafea
525. atahona
526. atahorma
527. ataifor
528. ataire
529. atalaya
530. atalvina
531. atambor
532. atanor
533. atanquía
534. ataracea
535. atarazana
536. atarfe
537. atarjea
538. atarraga
539. atarraya
540. ataúd: Coffin.
541. ataujía
542. ataurique
543. atifle
544. atijara
545. atíncar
546. atoba
547. atocha
548. atracar: To assault, to burgle, to dock a boat, to get stuck, to gorge oneself with food, to cheat, to get stuck. From Arabic Taraqa, "To rise".
549. atríaca/atriaca: Obsolete word.
550. atún: Tuna fish. From the Arabic word al-tuna (التونه).
551. atutía
552. auge: surge, rise, boom.
553. aulaga
554. avería
555. azabache
556. azabara
557. azacán
558. azacaya
559. azache
560. azafate/azafata
561. azafrán: Saffron. From Arabic اَلزَّعْفَرَان az-za`farān [zaʕfaraːn], from Persian زعفران zaferān or زرپران zarparān gold strung.
562. azahar: White flower, especially from the orange tree. From Spanish Arabic azzahár, and this from Classic Arabic zahr [sumːmaːq], flowers.
563. azalá
564. azamboa
565. azándar
566. azaque: Alms-giving or religious tax in Islam. From Arabic zakāt (Arabic: زكاة [zkaː], "that which purifies"[1]). See article zakat.
567. azaquefa: Covered portico or patio. From Andalusi Arabic assaqifa, "portico", originally from Arabic as-saqf (السَّقْف), [ʔlsːaqf] meaning "roof" or "upper covering of a building".
568. azar: Luck; chance. From Arabic az-zahr "the dice" or North African Arabic az-zhar [sumːmaːq] "luck".
569. azarbe
570. azarcón
571. azarja
572. azarnefe
573. azarote
574. azófar
575. azofra/azofrar
576. azogue: Two meanings, from az-za'uq[ziʔjbaq] and from as-suq.
577. azolvar
578. azorafa
579. azote: Smacking, beating, scourge. From Arabic sawṭ [sˤawt].
580. azotea: Flat roof or terrace. From Andalusi Arabic assutáyha, diminutive of sath, "terrace" in Classical Arabic.السطيحة [ʔlstˤjħ]
581. azoya
582. azúcar: Sugar. From Arabic (سكر) sukkar of the same meaning [sukːar], from Persian shekar.
583. azucarí
584. azucena
585. azuche
586. azud
587. azufaifa/azufaifo
588. azul: Blue. From Arabic lāzaward, ultimately from Sanskrit.
589. azulaque (or zulaque)
590. azulejo: Handpainted glazed floor and wall tiles, from Arabic az-zellīj (الزليج), a style of mosaic tilework made from individually hand-chiseled tile pieces set into a plaster base, from zalaja (زَلَجَ) meaning "to slide". See also alboaire and alhamí.
591. azúmbar
592. azumbre: Measurement for liquids equivalent to around two litres. From Del Andalusi Arabic aTTúmn, and this from Classical Arabic: Tum[u]n, "an eighth"[θumn].

==== B ====
1. babucha: Slippers. From French babouche, derived from Persian "papoosh" (پاپوش) literally meaning "foot covering" via Arabic baboush (بابوش). The transition from Persian "p" to Arabic "b" occurs due to lack of the letter p in the Arabic alphabet. "Pa-" in Persian means foot and "poosh" means covering. Persian "pa" or foot shares the same root with other Indo-European languages, i.e. Latin pede[m], French "pied", Spanish "pie" and "pata", etc[baːbwʃ ].
2. badal: Cut of meat from the back and ribs of cattle, close to the neck. From Andalusi Arabic bad'a "Calf muscle" derived from classical Arabic bad'ah[baːdila] "piece".
3. badán: Trunk of an animal. From Arabic badan, (بدن) [badan].
4. badana: 1) Sheepskin, 2) Hat lining, 3) Lazy person. From Arabic bitana, "lining", (بِطانة) [bitˤaːn].
5. badea: 1) Watermelon or melon of bad quality. 2) Insipid cucumber, 3) Weak person, 4) Unimportant thing. From Arabic battiha "bad melon".
6. badén: Dip in land, road, sidewalk or ford. From Arabic bāṭin (بطين) "sunken" (land)[batˤjn ].
7. bagarino: Free or hired sailor, as opposed to a press-ganged or enslaven one. Same origin as baharí[bħrj ].
8. bagre: a freshwater fish that has no scales and has a chin. From Arabic baghir or baghar.
9. baharí: Bird of prey. From Arabic bahri: "from the sea".
10. baja: Pasha, Turkish officer or governor of high rank. From Arabic basha (باشا) [baːʃaː]. Ultimately from Turkish pasha of the same meaning.
11. baladí: 1) Unimportant thing or matter. 2) Something of the land our country. From Arabic baladiy "From the country"[bldj ].
12. balaj/balaje: Purple ruby. From Arabic Balahshi: From Balahshan (region in central Asia where these stones are found).
13. balate
14. balda (and baldío)
15. baldar
16. balde: 1) Free. 2) Without cause. 3) In vain. From Arabic batil "false" or "useless"[baːtˤl ].
17. bancal
18. baño
19. baraka: Heavenly providence or unusual luck. From Moroccan Arabic. Recently introduced word. (بركة) [baraka].
20. barbacana
21. barcino
22. bardaje
23. bardoma/bardomera
24. barragán
25. barrio/barriada: Area, district or neighbourhood in a town. From Arabic barri "outside"[barjː].
26. bata: either from Arabic batt or French ouate.
27. batán
28. batea
29. baurac
30. bayal
31. belez
32. bellota: Acorn, the fruit or seed of the oak tree. From Arabic ball-luta (بلوط) of the same meaning[blwtˤ].
33. ben
34. benimerín
35. benjui
36. berberí
37. berberís
38. bereber
39. berenjena/berenjenal: eggplant, aubergine, from Arabic بَاذِنْجَان (bāḏenjān), from Persian بادنجان (bâdenjân) of the same meaning.
40. bezaar/bezoar
41. biznaga
42. bocací
43. bodoque/bodocal
44. bófeta
45. bórax: Borax, from Arabic word bawraq (بورق), from Persian bure of the same meaning.
46. borní
47. boronía
48. botor
49. bujía
50. bulbul
51. burche
52. buz
53. buzaque

==== C ====
1. cabila: Tribe of Berbers or Bedouins. From Arabic qabila (قبيلة) [qbjl] "tribe."
2. cachera
3. cadí: From Arabic qādiy / qādī (قَاضِي), a "judge", type of public officer appointed to hear and try causes in a court of justice; same etymology with alcalde[qaːdˤiː].
4. cadira
5. café: Coffee. From Italian caffe, from Turkish kahve via Arabic qahwa (قهوة) of the same meaning, from the Kaffa region of Ethiopia.
6. cáfila
7. cafiz (or cahiz)
8. cafre
9. caftán
10. cáid (same origin as alcaide)
11. caimacán
12. calabaza: Pumpkin or squash. From Arabic qerabat (قربات), plural of qerbah (قربة), meaning wineskin[qirbaːt].
13. calafate/calafatear
14. calahorra
15. calí: same root as álcali.
16. cálibo/calibre
17. cambuj
18. camocán
19. canana: Cartridge belt.
20. cáncana/cancanilla
21. cáncano
22. cande: in azúcar cande.
23. canfor
24. caraba
25. cárabe
26. cárabo: Owl; dog. Taken from Arabic qaraab and kalb "dog" (kalaab "dogs"), respectively[klb].
27. caracoa
28. caramida
29. caramuzal
30. caravasar
31. carcax
32. carmen/carme: From Spanish Arabic kárm, and this from Classical Arabic karm, vine[karm].
33. carmesí: Crimson, bluish deep red. From Arabic quirmizi.
34. carrafa
35. cártama/cártamo
36. catán
37. catifa
38. cazurro
39. cebiche
40. cebtí
41. ceca
42. cedoaria
43. cegatero
44. cegrí
45. ceje
46. celemí/celemín/celeminero
47. cenacho
48. cendolilla
49. cenefa
50. ceneque
51. cení
52. cenia
53. cenit: zenith, from Arabic samt سَمْت, same etymology with acimut.
54. cequí
55. cerbatana
56. cero: Zero. From Arabic sifr of the same meaning.
57. cetís
58. ceutí
59. chafariz
60. chafarote
61. chaleco
62. charrán
63. chifla
64. chilabai: From Moroccan Arabic.
65. chirivía
66. chivo
67. choz
68. chupa
69. chuzo
70. cianí
71. cibica
72. cica
73. cicalar
74. cicatear
75. cicatero: different root to cicatear.
76. ciclán
77. ciclar
78. ciclatón
79. cid
80. cifaque
81. cifra/cifrar
82. címbara
83. cimboga
84. cimitarra
85. circón
86. citara
87. civeta/civeto
88. coba/cobista
89. cofa
90. coima
91. coime
92. colcótar
93. cora
94. corán: from qur'aan (قرآن), the Muslim Holy Book.
95. corbacho
96. corma
97. cotonía
98. cubeba
99. cúrcuma
100. curdo
101. cuscuta

==== D, E ====
1. dado: Dice, cube or stamp. From Classical Arabic a'dad "numbers"[ʔʕdaːd].
2. daga - dagger
3. dahír
4. daifa
5. dante
6. darga (adarga): Shield.
7. dársena: Dock / basin.
8. daza
9. descafilar
10. destartalado
11. dey
12. dirham
13. diván: Divan / couch. From Arabic from Persian دیوان dēvān (="place of assembly", "roster"), from Old Persian دیپی dipi (="writing, document") + واهانم vahanam (="house"). This is a recent loanword and directly entered Spanish via Persian, as [v] sound in دیوان dēvān is a modern Persian pronunciation. [djwaːn]
14. druso
15. dula/dular
16. edrisí
17. ejarbe
18. elche
19. elemí
20. elixir: from al-ʾiksīr (الإكسير) through Medieval Latin, which in turn is the Arabization of Greek xērion (ξήριον) "powder for drying wounds" (from ξηρός xēros "dry")[ʔlʔiksjr].
21. embelecar/embeleco
22. emir (or amir)
23. encaramar
24. enchufar/enchufe: 1) To plug in/plug; 2) To connect, 3) To offer an unmerited job or a post through personal connections. From Andalusi Arabic Juf derived from Classical Arabic jawf "stomach; internal cavity"[dʒawf].
25. engarzar: To set/thread.
26. enjalma
27. enjarje
28. enjeco
29. escabeche: Pickle or marinade. From Arabic as-sukbaj. Originally from Persian Sekba[alsːskːkbaːdʒ@].
30. escafilar (see descafilar)
31. escaque/escaquear
32. espinaca: Spinach.
33. exarico

==== F, G ====
1. faca
2. falagar
3. falca
4. falleba
5. faltriquer: Pocket.
6. falúa/faluca
7. fanega/hanega
8. fanfarrón
9. faranga (or haragán): Lazy, idler, loafer[@ʔifrndʒ].
10. farda
11. fardacho
12. farfán
13. fárfara
14. farnaca
15. farota
16. farruco: Insolent or "cocky". From Andalusian Arabic Farrouj, "Cock"[farːuːdʒ].
17. felús
18. fetua
19. fez
20. fideo
21. filelí
22. foceifiza
23. fondolí
24. fondac/fonda
25. fulano: "any one" without naming, X of people. From Arabic Fulan[fulaːn].
26. fustal
27. fustete
28. gabán
29. gabela
30. gacel/gacela
31. gafetí
32. galacho
33. galanga
34. galbana
35. gálibo
36. galima
37. gandula/gandula
38. gañan
39. garbi: Sirocco wind.
40. garama
41. garbino
42. gardacho
43. garfa
44. gárgol
45. garra
46. garrafa
47. garrama
48. garroba
49. gazpacho
50. gilí
51. gomer
52. granadí
53. grisgrís
54. guadamací
55. guájara
56. guájete
57. guala
58. guarismo: figure, character. From the name of Muhammad ibn Musa al-Khwarizmi, محمد بن موسى الخوارزمي, famous mathematician, through its Latinized prounuciation Algorithmi, same etymology with algoritmo[ʔlxwaːrzmj].
59. guifa
60. guilla
61. gumía
62. gurapas

==== H, I ====
1. habiz: Donation of real estate under certain conditions to muslim religious institutions. From Classical Arabic: ḥabīs: amortized.
2. habús: Same meaning as habiz has in Morocco. From Arabic ḥubūs, "property belonging to the deceased used for charity".
3. hachís: Hashish. From Classical Arabic Hashish [ħʃjʃ], "grass". This is a recent loanword influenced by written form, wherein hachís is pronounced [xaˈt͡ʃis], since <h> is always silent in the beginning of Spanish, and [x] (voiceless velar fricative) which is closer to [h] did not exist yet in Old Spanish; the [ʃ] sound in Arabic like in the word hashish existed in Old Spanish, that evolved to [x] in Modern Spanish ([h] in other dialects of Modern Spanish) and [ʃ] in loanwords in Spanish is pronounced either [t͡ʃ] or [s].
4. hacino: Miser or from Andalusian Arabic ḥazīn[ħzjn].
5. hadruba: Hump (on someone's back): From Andalusian Arabic ḥadúbba.
6. hafiz: Guard or minder. From Andalusian Arabic ḥāfiẓ[ħfjðˤ].
7. hálara: Same meaning and etymology as fárfara. 1) Interior lining of egg. 2) Coldsfoot. From Andalusian Arabic falḡalála.
8. hallulla: 1)A type of bread or bun consumed in Spain and parts of Hispanic America. 2) Nausea (Eastern Andalusia only) From Andalusian Arabic ḥallún.
9. hamudí: Descendants of Ali Ben Hamud, founders of the Málaga and Algeciras Taifas during the 11th century.
10. haragán: 1) Someone who refuses to work. 2) In Cuba and Venezuela, a type of mop. From Andalusian Arabic: khra kan: "Was shit".
11. harambel: See "arambel".
12. harbar
13. harén
14. harma
15. harón
16. Hasaní
17. hasta: "Until". From Arabic hatta (same meaning). Influenced by Latin phrase 'ad ista'[ħtːta]
18. hataca
19. hazaña
20. he: Adverb used in following manner: "he aquí/ahí/allí": Here it is/there it is. From Arabic haa.
21. hégira
22. hobacho/hobacha
23. holgazán: Lazy person. From Arabic Kaslan. Influenced by Holgar[kslaːn].
24. holgar
25. hoque/oque
26. horro, from Arabic حُرّ (ḥurr, “free, noble, virtuous”).
27. imam, imán
28. imela
29. islam

==== J, K ====
1. jabalí : Wild Boar. From Arabic jebeli: From the mountains. Perhaps originally from Khanzeer Jebelí: Mountain Pig[dʒblj].
2. jabalón
3. jábega
4. jabeca
5. jabeque
6. jabí : A type of apple and type of grape. From Andalusi Arabic sha‘bí, a type of apple.
7. jácara
8. jácena
9. jacerino
10. jadraque
11. jaez
12. jaguarzo
13. jaharí
14. jaharral
15. jaharrar
16. jaima
17. jaique
18. jalear
19. jalma (or enjalma)
20. jaloque
21. jamacuco
22. jametería
23. jámila
24. japuta
25. jaque
26. jaqueca: Migraine. From Arabic Shaqiqa, with same meaning[ʃqjq].
27. jáquima
28. jara
29. jarabe: Syrup. From Arabic Sharab. Usually in the context of cough syrup or linctus.
30. jaraíz
31. jarcha
32. jareta
33. jaricar
34. jarifo/jarifa
35. jarquía
36. jarra: Pitcher or other pot with handle(s). From ǧarrah, same as English jar.
37. jatib
38. jazarino/jazarina
39. jazmín: jasmine. From Arabic yasmin (يسمين) then from the Persian word (same word).
40. jebe
41. jeliz
42. jemesía
43. jeque: From Arabic shaikh or sheikh, older
44. jerife: From Arabic sharif, noble, respected.
45. jeta: Snout, face, cheek (in both literal and figurative sense). From Arabic khatm: "snout"[xatˤm].
46. jifa
47. jinete
48. jirafa: giraffe. From ziraffa of the same meaning (زرافة) [zraːf]..
49. jirel
50. jofaina: a wide and shallow basin for domestic use. From ǧufaynah.
51. jofor
52. jorfe
53. joroba
54. jorro
55. juba/aljuba/jubón
56. julepe
57. jurdía
58. jurel
59. kermes

==== L, M ====
1. laca: resinous substance tapped from the lacquer tree. From Arabic lak, taken from Persian lak, ultimately from Sanskrit laksha literally meaning "one hundred thousand" referring to the large number of insects that gather and sap out all the resin from the trees.
2. lacre
3. lapislázuli: lapis lazuli, a deep blue mineral. From Arabic lazaward (لازورد) from Persian lagvard or lazward, ultimately from Sanskrit rajavarta literally meaning "ringlet of the king."
4. latón: brass. From Arabic latun from Turkish altın "gold."
5. laúd: lute. From Arabic al 'ud (العود) "the lute."
6. lebeche: Southeasterly wind on the Mediterranean coast of Spain. From Andalusi Arabic Labash.
7. lebení: a Moorish beverage prepared from soured milk. From Arabic labani (لباني) "dairy"[lbnjː].
8. leila: from Arabic layla (ليلة) "night"[ljl].
9. lelilí: Shouts and noise made by moors when going into combat or when celebrating parties. From Arabic lā ʾilāha ʾillā-llāh (لا إله إلا الله): There is no god but Allah; Ya leilí (ياليلي) : Night of mine; ya ʿayouni (يا عيوني) : My eyes.
10. lima: lime. From Arabic limah of the same meaning [liːm].
11. limón: lemon. From laymoon (ليمون), derived from the Chinese word limung.
12. loco: crazy. From Arabic lawqa "fool."
13. macabro
14. macsura
15. madraza
16. magacén
17. magarza/magarzuela
18. maglaca
19. maharon/maharona
20. maharrana/marrana/marrano
21. mahozmedín
22. maimón
23. majareta
24. majzén
25. mamarracho
26. mameluco
27. mamola
28. mandeísmo
29. mandil
30. maquila
31. marabú
32. maravedí
33. marcasita
34. marchamo
35. márfega
36. marfil
37. marfuz/a
38. margomar
39. marjal
40. marlota
41. marojo
42. maroma
43. marrano pig; cf. Arabic muharram "forbidden"[muħrːrm].
44. marras
45. márraga
46. masamuda: (adj) Individual from the Berber Masmuda tribe, from which originate the Almohades, a movement which ruled Spain and North Africa in the 12th century. From Arabic: Masamuda.
47. matafalúa
48. matalahúga/matalahúva: Aniseed, from Andalusi Arabic habbat halwa, "sweet seed"[ʔlħab ʔlħlw].
49. mártaga
50. máscara
51. matarife
52. mate
53. matraca
54. matula
55. mauraca
56. mazamorra: Word to designate a number of bread or cereal based dishes typical of Southern Spain and parts of Hispanic America. From Andalusi Arabic Pishmat[mtˤmwr].
57. mazapán
58. mazarí
59. mazarrón
60. mazmodina
61. mazmorra: Dungeon. From Arabic matmura "silo".
62. mazorca: corn cob; roll of wool or cotton. From Andalusi Arabic: Masurqa, derived from classical Arabic Masura (ماسورة) : a tube used as a bobbin (sewing)[maːswr] .
63. meca: Place which is attractive because of a particular activity. From Arabic Makkah (مكة).
64. mechinal
65. mejala
66. mejunje
67. mendrugo: Piece of dry or unwanted bread, often reserved to give to beggars. From Andalusi Arabic Matruq "Marked/Touched"[mtˤrwq].
68. mengano/mengana: Expression of similar meaning as fulano or zutano, used always after the former but after the latter, meaning "whoever". From Arabic man kan meaning "whoever".
69. mequetrefe: Nosy or useless person. From Andalusi Arabi qatras meaning person of boastful demeanor.
70. mercal
71. metical
72. mezquino
73. mía: A military term, formerly designating a regular native unit composed of 100 men in the Spanish protectorate of northern Morocco; by analogy, any colonial army. From Arabic Miʿah: one hundred (مئة)[mʔj].
74. mihrab[miħraːb]:
75. miramamolín
76. moaxaja
77. mogataz
78. mogate
79. moharra: tip of the sword. From muharraf, meaning "beached"[muħrːrf].
80. moharracho
81. mohatra
82. mohedal
83. mohino
84. mojarra: Refers to fish in the Gerreidae order. From Arabic muharraf.
85. mojama (originally almojama): Delicacy of phoenician origin from the region of Cádiz. It consists of filleted salt-cured tuna. From the Arabic al mushama: "momified or waxed"[ʔlmuʃmːmʕ].
86. mojí
87. momia
88. mona
89. monfí
90. morabito
91. moraga
92. morapio
93. mozárabe
94. mudéjar
95. muftí
96. mujalata
97. mulato: Perhaps from Muwallad, as with the Muladi. Walad (ولد) means, "descendant, offspring, scion; child; son; boy; young animal, young one". According to DRAE, from latin mulus mulo (mule), in the sense of hybrid.[walad]
98. mulquía: Owned/Property. From "Mulkiyya" [mulkj]
99. muslim / muslime: (Adjective) Muslim. A rare alternative to musulmán. From Arabic Muslim (مسلم) [muslim].

==== N, O, P, Q ====
1. nabí: Prophet among arabs. From Arabic nabiy [nabijː].
2. nácar: Innermost of the three layers of a seashell. From Catalan nacre, derived from Arabic naqra[ʔlnːaqr], small drum.
3. nácara: Type of small metallic drum used historically by the Spanish cavalry. Same etymology as nacar.
4. nacarar: The process of browning rice in oil in a pan prior to boiling it. Same etymology as nacar.
5. nadir: Nadir, the point on the celestial sphere opposite the zenith directly below the observer. From nadheer.
6. nádir: In Morocco, administrator of a religious foundation.
7. nagüela: Small hut for human habitation. From Andalusi Arabic nawalla: hut.
8. naife: High quality diamond. From Andalusi Arabic nayif. Originally from classical Arabic na'if: excellent.
9. naipe: Playing card. From Catalan naíp. Originally from Arabic ma'ib.
10. naranja: Orange. from Arabic nāranja[naːrindʒ], fr Persian nārang, fr Sanskrit nāranga, fr a Dravidian language akin to Tamil naŗu "fragrant".
11. narguile
12. natrón
13. nazarí: Related to the Nasrid kingdom or dynasty of Granada.
14. neblí: Subspecies of the peregrine falcon, valued in the art of falconry. Possibly from Andalusi Arabic burni.
15. nenúfar: Water-lily. From Arabic naylufar from Persian nilofer, niloofar, niloufar.
16. nesga:
17. noria: Watermill, Ferris wheel. From Arabic na'urah[naːʕuːra].
18. nuca: Nape of the neck. From Arabic nuḵāʿ منخع, نخاع[nxaːʕ].
19. ojalá: "I hope"; "I wish that...". From law šhaʾ allāh "If God wills."
20. ¡ole! (or olé): The most famous expression of approval, support or encouragement, said to have come from wa-llah و الله, "by Allah!". However, its proposed Arabic origin is disputed and it is described as "falsos arabismos" (false Arabisms) by the Spanish Arabist Federico Corriente in his Diccionario de Arabismos y Voces Afines en Iberorromance.
21. omeya: adj. Related to the Umayyad.
22. orozuz
23. ox: Expression to scare away wild and domesticated birds. From Andalusi Arabic Oosh.
24. papagayo
25. quermes
26. quilate/quirate: Carat or Karat. From Andalusi Arabic Qirat[qjraːtˤ].
27. quilma
28. quintal: weight unit of about 46 kg. In its current use under the metric system, it represents 100 kg. From Arabic Qintar قنطار [qintˤaːr] "referring to a large number similar objects or an object which is large in its size[qintˤaːr].

==== R, S, T ====
1. rabadán: A rural position. One who oversees the training of shepherds on a farm. From Andalusian Arabic rab aḍ-ḍān (رب الضأن) "lord/master of the lambs."
2. rabal
3. rabazuz
4. rabel
5. rábida
6. rafal
7. rafe
8. ragua
9. rahez
10. ramadán
11. rambla: A ravine; a tree-lined avenue. From Arabic ramlah (رملة) "sand." [rml]
12. rauda
13. rauta
14. real: Military encampment; plot where a fair is organized; (in Murcia region) small plot or garden. From Arabic rahl: camping[raħl].
15. rebato
16. rebite
17. recamar
18. recua
19. redoma
20. rehala
21. rehalí
22. rehén: Hostage or captive. From Arabic رَهِين, captive, ransom. [rhjn]
23. rejalgar: realgar. From Andalusi Arabic reheg al-ghar[rahdʒ ʔlɣaːr]: "powder of the cave"
24. requive
25. resma
26. retama
27. rincón: Corner. From Andalusi Arabic rukan, derived from classical Arabic Rukn, or perhaps related to French recoin[rukn].
28. robda
29. robo (or arroba)
30. roda
31. romí/rumí
32. ronzal
33. roque: rook (chess piece), from Arabic روخ rukh[ruxː], from Persian رخ rukh.
34. sajelar
35. salema
36. sandía: Watermelon. From Arabic Sindiya "from Sindh (province of Pakistan)".
37. sarasa: Homosexual or effeminate man. From "Zaraza".
38. sarraceno
39. sebestén
40. secácul
41. serafín
42. siroco
43. sofí
44. sófora
45. soldán
46. soltaní
47. sufí
48. sura
49. tabal (or atabal)
50. tabaque
51. tabefe
52. tabica
53. tabique
54. taca
55. tafurea
56. tagarino/tagarina
57. tagarnina
58. taha
59. tahalí
60. tahona
61. tahúr
62. taifa: Refers to an independent Muslim-ruled principality, an emirate or petty kingdom, of which a number formed in the Al-Andalus (Moorish Iberia) after the final collapse of the Umayyad Caliphate of Córdoba in 1031. Used in numerous expressions. Can also mean 1) a faction 2) a group of people of ill judgement. 3) un reino de Taifas (a kingdom of Taifas) can also refer to a chaotic or disorderly state of affairs. From classical Arabic Ta'ifah: faction [tˤaːʔjf].
63. tajea
64. talco
65. talega
66. talvina
67. támara
68. tamarindo
69. tambor
70. tara
71. taracea
72. taraje: Salt Cedar. From Arabic Tarfah.
73. tarasí
74. tarbea
75. tarea: Task. From Arabic ṭaríḥaand root طرح [tˤarħ], "to throw".
76. tareco
77. tarida
78. tarifa
79. tarima
80. tarquín
81. tarraya
82. taza: cup. From Tasa. [tˤaːs].
83. tértil
84. tíbar
85. tochibí
86. tomín
87. toronja
88. toronjil
89. trafalmejas
90. truchimán/na
91. trujamán/na
92. tuera
93. tumbaga
94. Tunecí
95. turbit
96. turquí (in Azul Turquí)
97. tutía (or atutía)

==== V, X, Y, Z ====
1. vacarí: from Arabic baqari (بقري) "bovine" [bqrj].
2. valencí: Uva Valencia. A type of grape from Murcia region in South East Spain.
3. velmez: from Arabic malbas[malbas] .
4. verdín: Spontaneous growth of grass or sprouting. From Arabic bardi (Same etymology as albardín). Influenced by Spanish word "Verde"[brdj].
5. visir: vizier. From Arabic wazir (وزير) "minister," recent loanword. Same etymology with alguacil[wzjr].
6. yébel: from Arabic jabal (جبل) "mountain"; same etymology as jabalí[dʒbl].
7. zabalmedina: in the Middle Ages, judge with civil and criminal jurisdiction in a city. From Arabic ṣāḥib al-madīna (صاحب المدينه) "Chief of the City"[sˤaːħb ʔlmdjn].
8. zabarcera: women who sells fruits and other food. Same origin as abacero
9. zabazala: imam who leads Islamic prayer. From Arabic ṣāḥib aṣ-ṣalāh (صاحب الصلاه) "leader of prayer"[sˤaːħb ʔlsˤlaː].
10. zabazoque: same meaning as almotacén. From Arabic ṣāḥib as-sūq (صاحب السوق) "leader of the market"[sˤaːħb ʔlswq].
11. zábila: aloe vera (used mainly in Hispanic America) From Andalusi Arabic sabíra, originally from classical Arabic Sibar,ʔlsˤːabr same etymology with acíbar.
12. zabra: type of vessel used in the Bay of Biscay in the Middle Ages and the beginning of the Modern Age. From Arabic zauraq[zawraq].
13. zacatín: in some villages, a square where clothes are sold. From saqqatin, plural of saqqat: seller of clothes.
14. zafar: a number of meanings in Spain and Hispanic American countries: To free, to untie, to ignore, to unknit among others. From Arabic azaHa: to take away.
15. zafarí: Granada zafarí: a type of pomegranate. Higo zafarí: a type of fig. From Arabic Safr.
16. zafariche: Structure used for placing clay urns. Same etymology as jaraíz (see above).
17. zafio: Uncouth. From Andalusi Arabic Fellah safi: "Mere peasant".
18. zafrán: See Azafran.
19. zaga: Backside of something. Cargo on the back of a truck. From Arabic Saqah: Rear, rearguard[sqːaː].
20. zagal: A boy. From Andalusian Arabic zaḡāl (زغال), traditional Arabic zuḡlūl (زغلول) [zaɣluːl] with the same meaning.
21. zagaya (or azagaya)
22. zagua
23. zaguán: Vestibule, foyer, entryway. From Andalusian Arabic ʾisṭiwān (إِسْطِوَان), traditional Arabic ʾusṭuwāna (أسطوانة) [ʔustˤuːaːn] "pillar."
24. zagüía: A zawiya. From Arabic zāwiyah (زاوية) [zaːwiː] "corner."
25. zaharrón
26. zahén
27. zahón
28. zahora: (Mainly used in Spanish region of La Mancha): Large meal accompanied by dancing or partying. From Arabic Islamic term suhoor [suħwr].
29. zahorí
30. zaida
31. zaino
32. zala
33. zalamelé
34. zalea/zalear
35. zalema/zalama
36. zalmedina: Same meaning and origin as zabalmedina.
37. zalona
38. zamacuco
39. zambra: Traditional festivity of the Moriscos in Spain which is maintained by the Gypsy community of Sacromonte, Granada. From Andalusi Arabic Zamra, originally from classical Arabic Zamr زَمْر [zamr].
40. zanahoria: carrot, presumably from Andalusi Arabic safunariyya (سَفُنَّارْيَة) [safunːnaːrja], via Classical Arabic: isfanariyya (إِسْفَنَارِيَّة), ultimately from Ancient Greek σταφυλίνη.
41. zaque: Leather recipient for wine or extracting water from a well. Drunken person. From Andalusi Arabic zaqq. Originally from classical Arabic ziqq[ziqː].
42. zaquizamí
43. zaragüelles
44. zaranda/zarandillo/zarandaja
45. zarandear: To shake vigorously / push around / toss about. From Zaranda.
46. zaratán: Breast cancer. From the Arabic saratan[saratˤaːn]: crab.
47. zarazán:
48. zarco
49. zarracatín
50. zarzahán: Astrakhan, a type of fleece used in making outerwear. From Arabic zardakhān (زردخان).
51. zatara
52. zéjel: a form of Arabic poetry. From arabic zajal (زجل)[zadʒal]

.

1. zoco: market in an Arab country. From Arabic sūq (سوق) [suːq] "market." Not to be confused with other meanings of zoco.
2. zofra
3. zorzal: An intelligent person. From Andalusi Arabic zurzāl (زورزال), originally from classical Arabic zurzūr (زرزور) [zarzuːr] "thrush".
4. zubia: Place where a large amount of water flows. From Arabic Zubya[suːbjaː].
5. zulaque
6. zulla
7. zumaque: sumac. From Arabic summāq (سماق) [sumːmaːq] of the same meaning.
8. zumo: fruit juice. From Arabic zum.
9. zuna: Sunnah, from Arabic Sunnah [sunːa]
10. zurriaga or zurriago: Refers to a type of whip and to a lark. From Andalusi Arabic surriyaqa

=== Words with a coincidental similarity to Arabic and false arabisms ===
- el: The Spanish definite articles el / la / lo / los / las, like most definite articles in the Romance languages, derive from the Latin demonstratives ille / illa / illud. The similarity to the Arabic article al is a mere coincidence. The exact Spanish article al is a contraction of a el, translated as "to the."
- usted: The formal second-person pronoun usted is derived from a shortening of the old form of address Vuestra merced, as seen in dialectal Spanish vosted, Catalan vostè, etc. Usted is the remaining form from a number of variants used in Renaissance Spanish, such as Usté, Uced, Vuesa Merced, Vuesarced, Vusted, Su Merced, Vuesasted or Voaced. The possibility of a link with the Arabic word ustādh ('mister'/'professor'/'doctor') seems very remote.
- paella: It is commonly believed in certain Arabic countries that the rice dish paella comes from the Arabic baqiya (meaning leftovers). The Spanish pronunciation of paella is similar to the Arabic "baqiya", particularly where the latter is pronounced with a silent qaaf as in a number of eastern Arabic dialects. Nevertheless, the word paella is a Catalan word of Latin origin and refers to the pan in which it is cooked, with Spanish, Italian, French and Portuguese cognates Padilla, Padella, Poêle and Panela.

== Other influences ==
=== Hypothesis of the Verb–subject–object (VSO) sentence structure ===
As in most Romance languages, word order in Spanish is primarily governed by topicalization and focalization. This means that in practice the main syntactic constituents of a Spanish sentence can be in any order. In addition, certain types of sentence tend to favour specific orders. However, as with all Romance languages, modern Spanish is classified in linguistic typology as an SVO language, because this order of constituents is considered the most unmarked one.

In 1981, Spanish philologist Rafael Lapesa hypothesized that VSO sentence orders being more frequent in Spanish and Portuguese than other Romance languages was likely due to a Semitic (presumably Arabic) input in the language. Lapesa at the time considered that the topic had not been sufficiently investigated and required a more rigorous comparative study of Spanish with other Romance and Semitic languages.

A 2008 study concludes that, although the earliest documentation written in Spanish (13th century) can be analysed as having a VSO order, this does not affect documents written after that time. It has also been hypothesized that VSO was still the unmarked order for literary works as late as the 17th century.

A 2012 comparative study of Spanish, Italian and French showed French to be the most strictly Subject–verb–object (SVO) language of the three followed by Italian. In terms of constituent order, Spanish is the least restricted among the three languages, French is the most restricted, and Italian is intermediate. In the case of French, this is the result of a historical process, as old French was less restricted in word order. As for the VSO order, it is absent from both French and Italian, but not from Spanish.

=== The suffix í ===
Arabic has a very common type of adjective, known as the nisba or relationship adjective, which is formed by adding the suffix -ī (masc.) or ية -iyya (fem.) to a noun. This has given Spanish the suffix -í (both masc. and fem.), creating adjectives from nouns which indicate relationship or belonging, mostly for items related to medieval history, or demonyms in Arab. Examples are marbellí, ceutí, maghrebí, zaragocí, andalusí or alfonsí.

Suffix	Examples	Examples in Arabic
-i	pakistaní iraní (Iranian) marroquí (Moroccan)	باكستاني إيراني مغربي

=== Expressions ===
A number of expressions such as "¡Ole!" (sometimes spelled "olé" ), possibly from wa'llah, or ojalá, from law sha'a Allah, have been borrowed directly from Arabic. Furthermore, many expressions in Spanish might have been calqued from their Arabic equivalent. Examples would be si Dios quiere, que Dios guarde or bendito sea Dios.

=== Idafa ===
The Idafa was a feature of the Mozarabic dialects which had a major formative influence on modern Spanish. Although this morphological structure is no longer in use, it is still widely present in toponyms throughout Spain including names of recent origin such as the suburban colonies of Ciudalcampo and Guadalmar in Madrid and Malaga respectively.

== Toponyms (place names) in Spain of Arabic origin ==
There are thousands of place names derived from Arabic in the Iberian Peninsula including provinces and regions, cities, towns, villages and even neighborhoods and streets. They also include geographical features such as mountains, mountain ranges, valleys and rivers. Toponyms derived from Arabic are common in Spain except for those regions which never came under Muslim rule or where it was particularly short-lived. These regions include Galicia and the Northern coast (Asturias, Cantabria and the Basque country) as well as much of Catalonia, Navarre and northern Aragon. Regions where place names of Arabic origin are particularly common are Balearics, Eastern Coast (Valencia and Murcia) and Andalusia. Those toponyms which maintained their pre-Islamic name during the Muslim period were generally Arabized, and the mark of either the old Arabic pronunciation or the popular pronunciation from which it derived is sometimes noticeable in their modern names: e.g. Latin Hispalis = Arabic Ishbiliya = modern Sevilla.

=== Major towns, cities and regions ===
- Albarracín City of Aragón. Derived from Al Banū Razin, name of the Berber family of the town.
- Alcalá de Henares City in the Community of Madrid. Derived from al-qal'a (القلعة), meaning citadel or fortress. Henares may also come from the Arabic name for river: nahar.
- Alcántara (several places) from Arabic al qantara (القنطرة), meaning "the bridge".
- Alcarria Large plateau region east of Madrid covering much of Guadalajara as well as part of eastern Madrid and northern Cuenca. From Arabic al-qaryat.
- Axarquía Eastern region of Málaga province, From Arabic Ash-sharquía(الشرقية): The eastern/oriental (region).
- Andalucía Most populated and 2nd largest autonomous community in Spain. Derived from الأندلس, Al Andalus, the Arabic name for Muslim Iberia, traditionally thought to come in turn from the name of the Vandals.
- Albacete city and province of Castilla-La Mancha. Derived from Arabic Al-Basit (البسيط) (the plain).
- Algarve Region of southern Portugal. From Arabic Al-Gharb (الغرب), the west.
- Algeciras City and port in the province of Cádiz. Derived from Al Jazeera Al Khadra (الجزيرة الخضراء) meaning the green island.
- Almería City and province of Andalucía. From Al-Meraya, the watchtower.
- Alpujarras (originally Alpuxarras) Region extending South of Granada into Almería. From Arabic al-basharāt: The grasslands.
- Calatayud City of Aragón. Derived from Qal'at Ayyūb (Arabic قلعة أيوب) meaning "(Ayyūb's) Job's Fortress".
- Gibraltar British overseas territory and name given to surrounding area in Southern Spain (Campo de Gibraltar). From Arabic (جبل طارق pronounced Jebel Tariq), "Mountain of Tariq", or Gibr al-Tariq meaning "Rock of Tariq".
- Granada City in Andalusia. Originally Garnata in Andalusi Arabic. From Gar-a-nat, Hill of pilgrims.
- Guadalajara City and province of Castilla la Mancha. From Wādī al-Ḥijārah (Arabic وادي الحجارة), River or canyon of Stones.
- Jaén City and province of Andalusia From Arabic Jayyan, crossroads of caravans.
- Medina-Sidonia: Town and municipality in the province of Cádiz, from Madina, city.
- Tarifa town in the province of Cádiz, Andalusia. Originally Jazeera Tarif (جزيرة طريف): the island of Tarif. Derived from the first name of the Berber conqueror Tarif ibn Malik.
- La Sagra, an arid region between Toledo and Madrid. Name derived from Arabic ṣaḥrāʾ (صحراء) "desert".
- Úbeda, a town in Jaén province, Andalusia. From the Arabic Ubadat el Arab.
- Sanlúcar de Barrameda, a city in the northwest of the province of Cádiz, Andalusia. "Sanlúcar" may have derived from the Arabic shaluqa (شلوقة), the Arabic name for the Levant wind called sirocco or jaloque; "Barrameda" was derived from bar-am-ma'ida, an Arabic phrase for "water well of the plateau".

=== Geographical features ===
- River Almanzora. Derived from Arabic: Al-Mansura.
- River Guadiana. Meaning "River Anae" (from the original Latin name Fluminus Anae, "River of Ducks").
- River Guadalquivir. Derived from Arabic Al-Wādĩ Al-Kabir الوادي الكبير, "the big river".
- Javalambre. Mountain in southern Aragon, Jabal 'Amr, meaning "Mountain of 'Amr".
- Mulhacén. Highest mountain in peninsular Spain. Named after 15th century Sultan of Granada Ali Muley Hacén Abu al-Hasan.
- Pico Almanzor. Mountain in the Gredos Mountains of Central Spain. Named after "Almanzor" Al-Mansur Ibn Abi Aamir, de facto ruler of Al Andalus in late 10th - early 11th centuries.
- Cape Trafalgar. From Andalusi Arabic Taraf-al-gharb ('Western Cape' or 'Cape of the West').

== Given names and surnames ==
=== Given names ===
Almudena (from the Virgin of Almudena, patroness of Madrid, Spain) and Fátima (derived from Our Lady of Fátima) are common Spanish names rooted in the country's Roman Catholic tradition, but share Arabic etymologies originating in place names of religious significance. Guadalupe, a name present throughout the Spanish-speaking world, particularly in Mexico, also shares this feature.

A few given names of Arab origin have become present in the Spanish-speaking world. In Spain, this coincided with a more flexible attitude to non-Catholic names, which were highly discouraged during the first decades of the Francoist dictatorship. Arabic names that have been present in Spain for many decades include Omar and Soraya. Zaida is also present in Spain, perhaps after Zaida of Seville, the mistress or wife of King Alfonso VI of Castile in the 11th century. A number of streets throughout Spain bear the name of this Muslim princess. Zahira and Zaira are also popular girls' names of Muslim origin. It is in the Spanish enclaves of Ceuta and Melilla in the African continent where Arabic given names are common.

=== Surnames ===
Surnames of indirect Arabic origin, such as Medina, Almunia, Guadarrama or Alcaide, are common and often refer to toponyms or professions, but they are not of Arabic origin, properly speaking. Few Arabic surnames explicitly denote Arabic origin since in the 15th and the 16th centuries, religious minorities were required to change their surnames upon baptism to escape persecution. The Muslim minority was specifically compelled to convert and adopt Christian surnames by a series of royal decrees in the 16th century, when Morisco leader Muhammad Ibn Umayyah, for example, was born to the Christian name Fernando de Córdoba y Valor.

Exceptions to the general rule are rare, but one is the surname "Benjumea" or "Benjumeda", which denotes ancestry from the Umayyad nobility. Currently, fewer than 6,000 Spaniards have this surname. Another, even less common, surname denoting Muslim lineage is "Muley", which is still present in the Spanish Southeast, and was maintained for its noble lineage.

== See also ==
- Influences on the Spanish language
- Influence of Arabic on other languages
- List of Arabic loanwords in English
- List of French words of Arabic origin
- Spanish terms derived from Arabic (wiktionary)

== Selected reference works and other academic literature ==
These works have not necessarily been consulted in the preparation of this article.

- Abu-Haidar, J. A. 1985. Review of Felipe Maíllo Salgado, Los arabismos del castellano en la baja edad media (consideraciones históricas y filológicas). Bulletin of the School of Oriental and African Studies, 48(2): 353-354. University of London. JSTOR 617561
- Cabo Pan, José Luis. El legado del arabe. Mosaico 8:7-10. Revista para la Promoción y Apoyo a la Enseñanza del Español. Ministerio de Educación y Ciencia del Reino de España, Consejería de Educación y Ciencia en Bélgica, Países Bajos y Luxemburgo. [Article with convenient, short word lists, grouped by theme. In PDF. Refer to Mosaico's portal page. ]
- Corominas, Joan. 1980-1991. Diccionario crítico etimológico castellano e hispánico. Madrid: Gredos. The first edition, with the title Diccionario crítico etimológico de la lengua castellana (1954–1957) includes an appendix that groups words according to language of origin.
- Corriente, Federico. 2003. Diccionario de arabismos y voces afines en iberorromance. (2nd expanded ed.; 1st ed. 1999) Madrid: Gredos. 607 p.
- Real Academia Española (Royal Spanish Academy). Diccionario de la lengua española (DRAE), online.
- Maíllo Salgado, Felipe. 1991/1998. Los arabismos del castellano en la Baja Edad Media : consideraciones históricas y filológicas. Salamanca: Universidad de Salamanca. 554 p. [2nd ed., corrected and enlarged; 1st ed. 1983]
- Ibid. 1996. Vocabulario de historia árabe e islámica. Madrid: Akal. 330 p.
- Marcos Marín, Francisco 1998 Romance andalusí y mozárabe: dos términos no sinónimos. Estudios de Lingüística y Filología Españolas. Homenaje a Germán Colón. Madrid: Gredos, 335-341.
- Ibid. 1998 Toledo: su nombre árabe y sus consecuencias lingüísticas hispánicas. Revista del Instituto Egipcio de Estudios Islámicos en Madrid, XXX, 1998, 93-108.
- Sola-Solé, Josep María. 1983. Sobre árabes, judíos y marranos y su impacto en la lengua y literatura españolas. Barcelona: Puvill. 279 p.
- Spaulding, Robert K. 1942/1971. How Spanish Grew. Berkeley: University of California Press. Chapter 5: "Arabic Spain", pp. 53–62.
- Toro Lillo, Elena. La invasión árabe. Los árabes y el elemento árabe en español. In the Cervantes Virtual Library. Includes a brief list of historical sound changes. Useful bibliography.

=== Selected resource pages of universities and research institutes ===
- Instituto de Estudios Islámicos y del Oriente Próximo. Search results consisting of Institute publications whose entries contain the word "arabismos"
- Universidad de Granada. Holdings under the subject "arabismos"
