= Cape Trafalgar =

Headland in southwest Spain

Cape Trafalgar Cabo de Trafalgar
- Cape
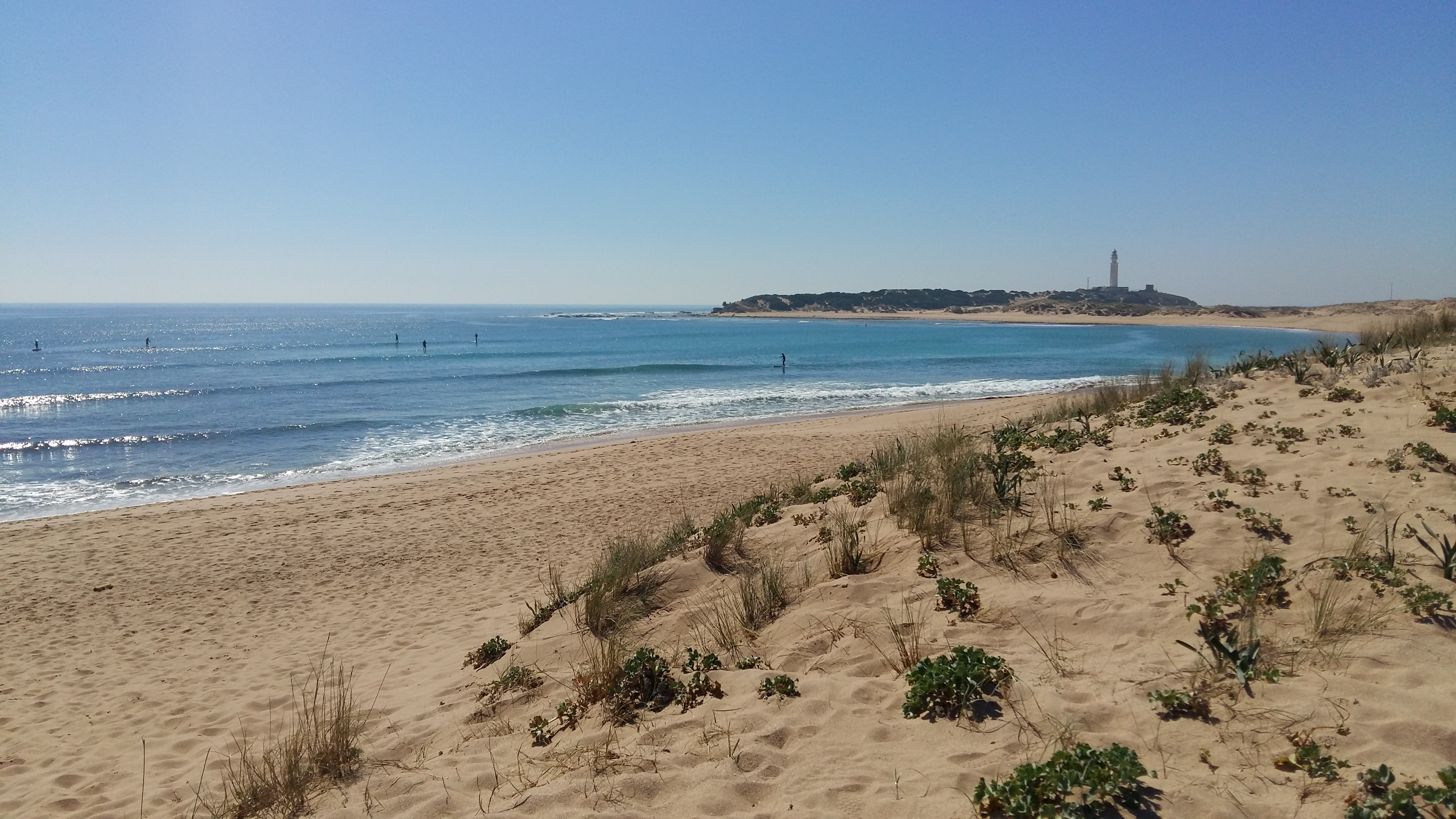
- Cape Trafalgar lighthouse in the distance

- Location within Province of Cádiz Location within Andalusia Location within Spain
- Coordinates: 36°11′N 6°2′W

Cape Trafalgar (/trəˈfælɡər/; Spanish: Cabo Trafalgar [ˈkaβo tɾafalˈɣaɾ]) is a headland in the Province of Cádiz in the southwest of Spain. Cape Trafalgar lies on the shore of the Atlantic Ocean, northwest of the Strait of Gibraltar. The International Hydrographic Organization defines the western limit of the strait and the Mediterranean Sea as a line that joins Cape Trafalgar to the north with Cape Spartel to the south.

On 21 October 1805, the Battle of Trafalgar was fought off Cape Trafalgar, in which a Royal Navy fleet commanded by Horatio Nelson defeated a combined fleet of the French and Spanish navies as part of the War of the Third Coalition.

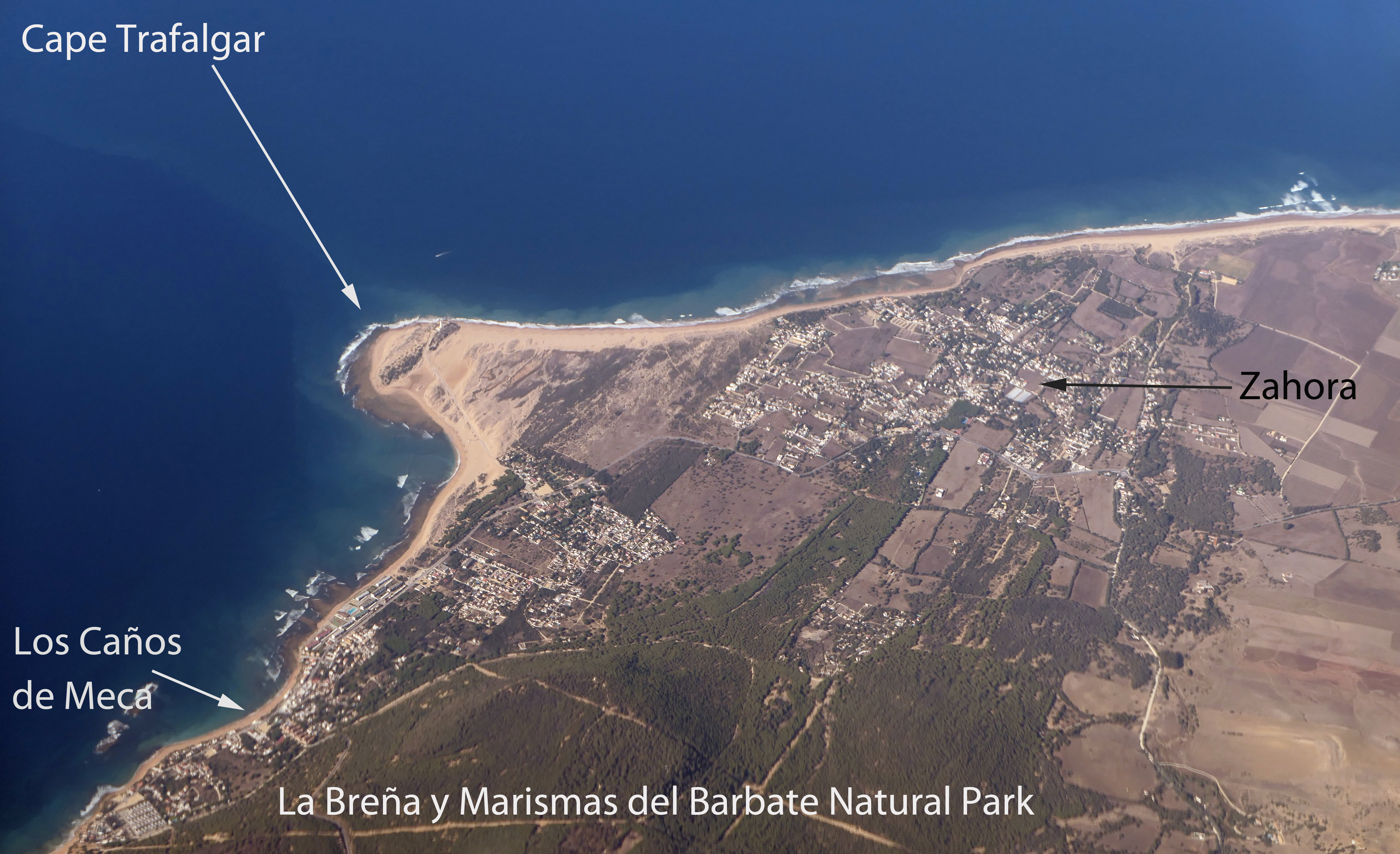
Aerial view of Cape Trafalgar and the surrounding area (north to the right)

The most prominent structure on the cape is a 34 m (112 ft) lighthouse, which totals 51 m (167 ft) above sea level), the Faro de Cabo Trafalgar, which was first illuminated on 15 July 1862.

== Etymology ==
The name is of Arabic origin, deriving either from Taraf al-Ghar (طرف الغار 'cape of the cave/laurel'), or from Taraf al-Gharb (طرف الغرب 'cape of the west'). In both cases, taraf (طرف) means 'edge' or 'extremity' and refers to a promontory. In modern Arabic, however, the place is sometimes re-transcribed as al-Taraf al-Aghar (الطرف الأغر).

== Archaeology ==
In May 2021, 2,000-year-old Roman baths emerged from the sand dunes of Cape Trafalgar, including entire walls, windows and doors.

== See also ==
- Trafalgar Square
