= Almudena =

Almudena or La Almudena may refer to:

- Almudena (given name), a feminine Spanish given name
- Virgin of Almudena, medieval statue of Mary, Mother of Jesus, kept in Madrid
- Catedral de la Almudena, in Madrid
- Cementerio de la Almudena, the biggest cemetery of Madrid
- La Almudena (Madrid Metro), a station

== See also ==
- Almudaina, municipality in eastern Spain
- Royal Palace of La Almudaina, in Majorca
