= Almudena (given name) =

Almudena is a feminine Spanish given name. Notable people with the name include:

- Almudena Bernabeu, Spanish lawyer
- Almudena Cid Tostado (born 1980), Spanish rhythmic gymnast
- Almudena Fernández (born 1974), Spanish model
- Almudena Gallardo (born 1979), Spanish archer
- Almudena Gracia Manzano (born 1971), Spanish actress, singer, and TV presenter
- Almudena Grandes (born 1960), Spanish writer
- Almudena Muñoz (born 1968), Spanish judoka
- Almudena Suarez, Spanish engineer
