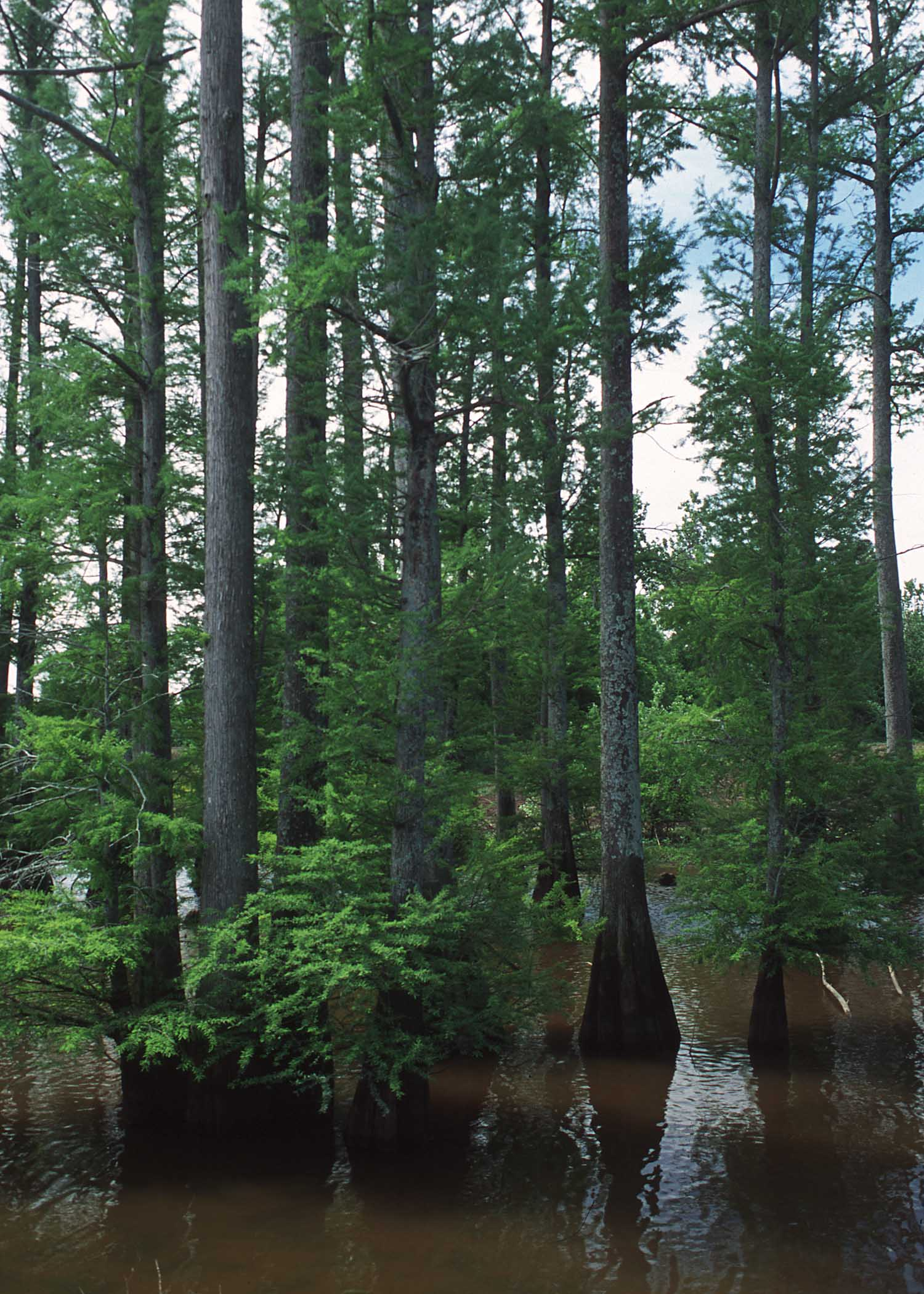
- Bald cypress forest in a central Mississippi lake

Conservation status
- Least Concern (IUCN 3.1)

- Secure (NatureServe)

Scientific classification
- Kingdom: Plantae
- Clade: Tracheophytes
- Clade: Gymnosperms
- Division: Pinophyta
- Class: Pinopsida
- Order: Cupressales
- Family: Cupressaceae
- Genus: Taxodium
- Species: T. distichum

Binomial name
- Taxodium distichum (L.) Rich.
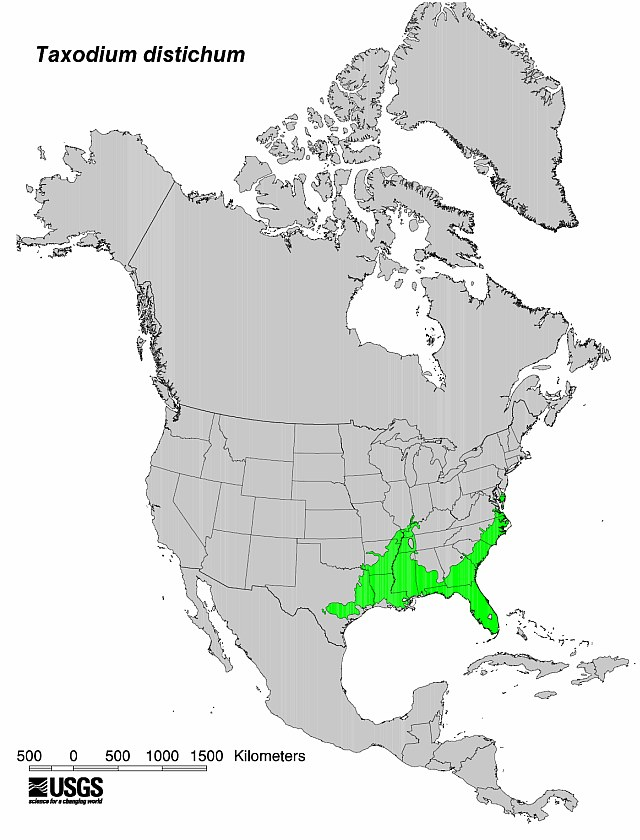

= Taxodium distichum =

Taxodium distichum Temporal range: Pliocene–present

Species of cypress tree

Taxodium distichum, the bald cypress, bald-cypress, baldcypress, or swamp cypress; French: cyprès chauve; cipre in Louisiana) is a deciduous conifer in the cypress family, Cupressaceae. It is native to the Southeastern United States. Hardy and tough, this tree adapts to a wide range of soil types, whether wet, salty, dry, or swampy. It is noted for the russet-red fall color of its lacy needles. It is both extremely flood tolerant and rather drought hardy.

This plant has some cultivated varieties and is often used in groupings in public spaces. Common names include bald cypress, swamp cypress, white cypress, tidewater red cypress, gulf cypress, and red cypress.

The bald cypress was designated the official state tree of Louisiana in 1963.

Bald cypress trees are valued because of their rot-resistant heartwood when the trees are mature. Because of this, the trees are often used for making fence posts, doors, flooring, caskets, and a number of other items.

== Description ==
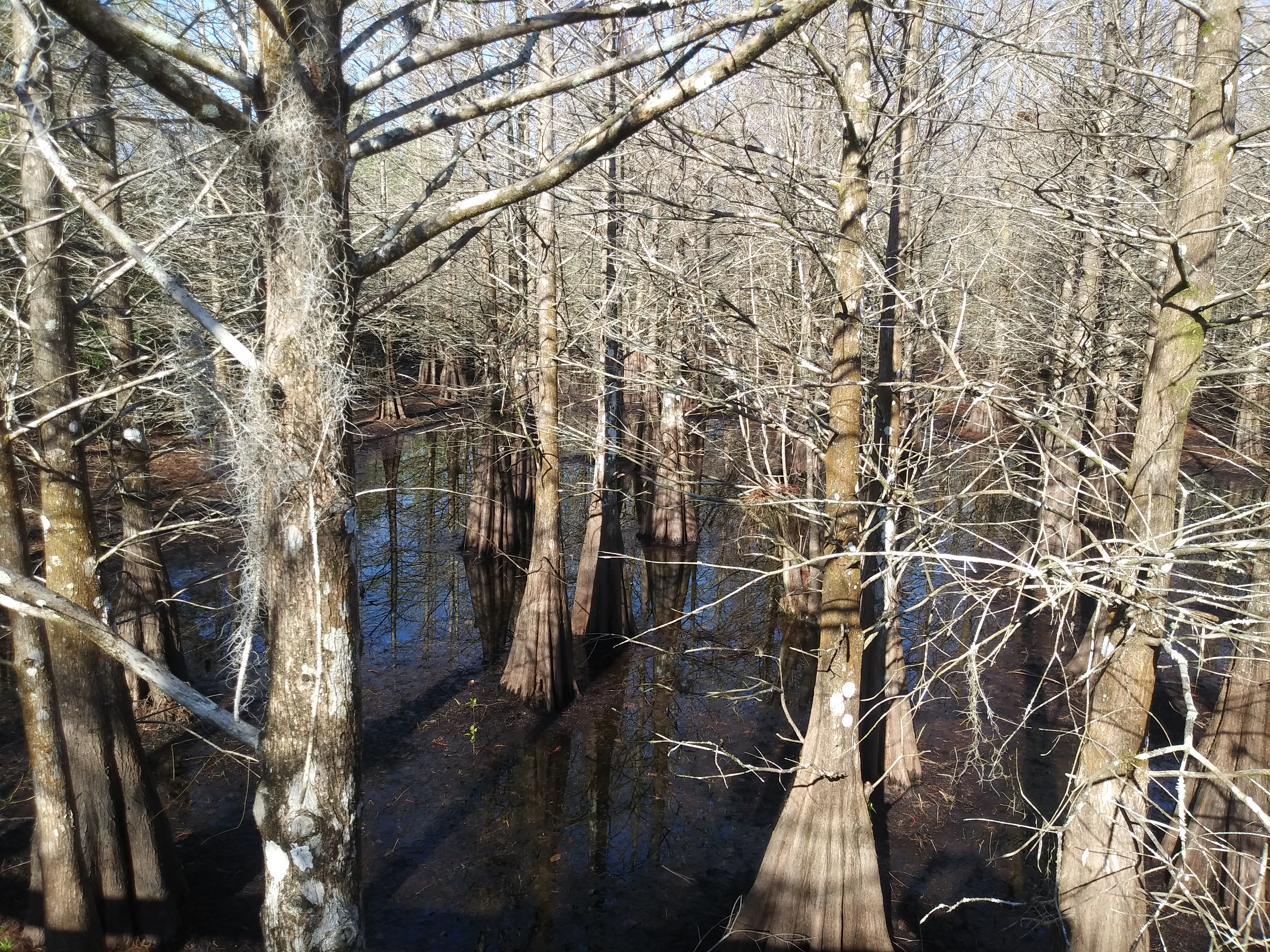
Cypress grove in winter

Taxodium distichum is a large, slow to fast-growing, and long-lived deciduous coniferous tree. It typically grows to heights of 35–120 feet (10–40 m) and has a trunk diameter of 3–7 feet (0.9–2.1 m).

The main trunk is often surrounded by cypress knees. The bark is grayish brown to reddish brown, thin, and fibrous with a stringy texture. Young trees have more easily-peelable bark.

The needle-like leaves are 1/2 to 3/4 inch (1.3 to 1.9 cm) long and are simple, alternate, green, and linear, with entire margins. In autumn, the leaves turn yellow or copper red. The bald cypress is deciduous.

This species is monoecious, with male and female cones on a single plant forming on slender, tassel-like structures near the edge of branchlets. The tree produces cones in April and the seeds ripen in October. The male and female strobili are produced from buds formed in late autumn, with pollination in early winter, and mature in about 12 months. Male cones emerge on panicles that are 4–5 inches (10–13 cm) inches long. Female cones are round, resinous and green while young. They then turn hard and then brown as the tree matures. They are globular and 2.0–3.5 cm (3/4–1 3/8 in) in diameter. They have from 20 to 30 spirally arranged, four-sided scales, each bearing one, two, or rarely three triangular seeds. Each cone contains 20 to 40 large seeds. The cones disintegrate at maturity to release the seeds. The seeds are 5–10 mm (3/16–13/32 in) long, the largest of any species of Cupressaceae, and are produced every year, with heavy crops every 3–5 years. The seedlings have three to nine, but usually six, cotyledons each.

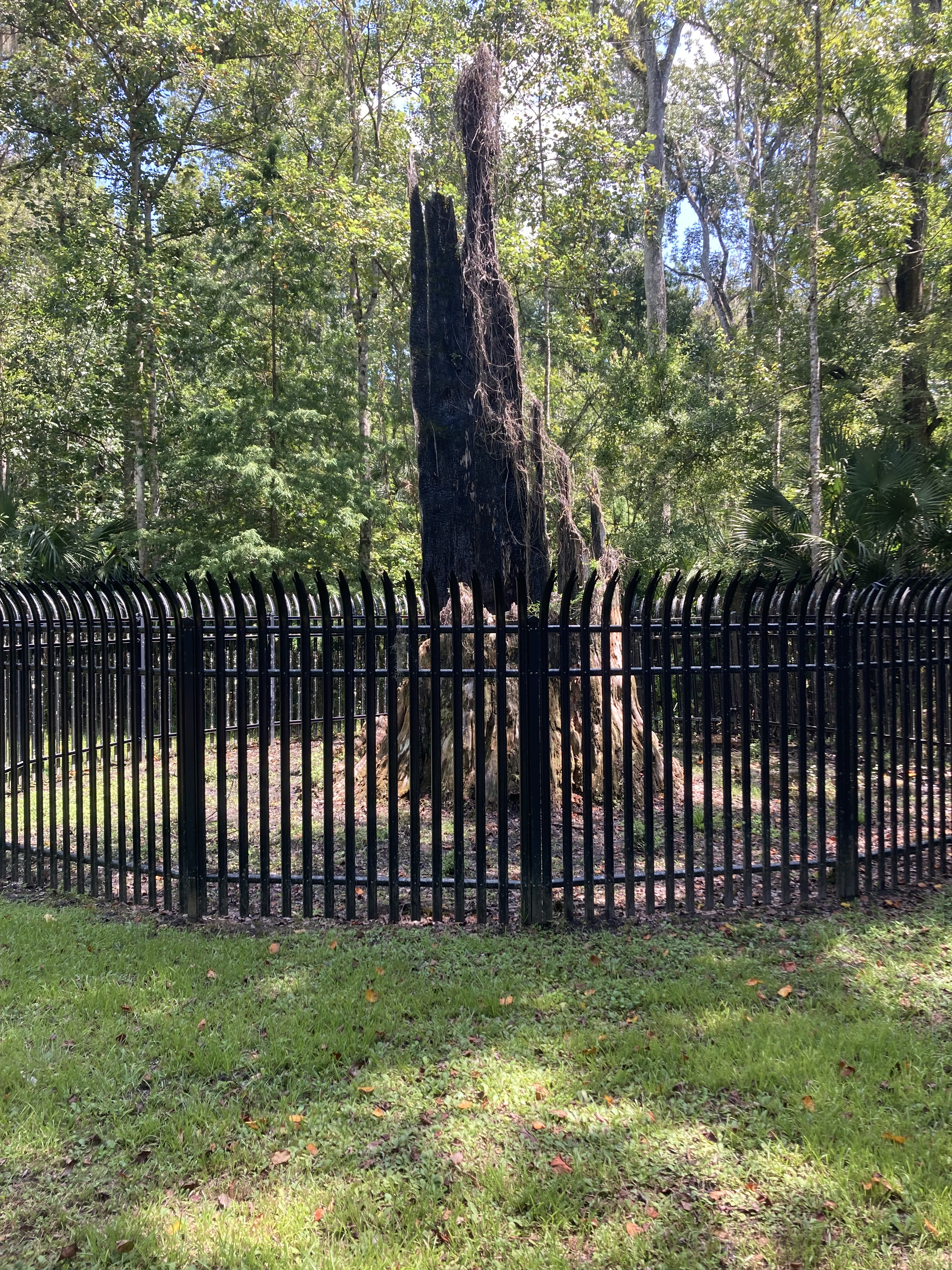
The "Senator" bald cypress tree

The bald cypress grows in full sunlight to partial shade; it grows best in wet or well-drained soil, but can tolerate dry soil. It is moderately able to grow in aerosols of salt water. It does well in acid, neutral, and alkaline soils across the full range of light (sandy), medium (loamy), and heavy (clay) soils. It can also grow in saline soils. It can tolerate atmospheric pollution. The cones are often consumed by wildlife.

The tallest known specimen, near Williamsburg, Virginia, is 44.11 m (145 ft) tall. The National Champion Bald Cypress is recognized as the largest member of its species in the country and is listed as such on the National Register of Champion Trees by American Forest. The National Champion Bald Cypress is in the Cat Island National Wildlife Refuge, near St. Francisville, Louisiana, and it is 96 feet (29 m) tall, 56 feet (17 m) in circumference, and is estimated to be approximately 1,500 years old. The oldest known living specimen, found along the Black River in North Carolina, is at least 2,624 years old, rendering it the oldest living tree in eastern North America.

The Senator, a bald cypress in Longwood, Florida, was 165 feet (50 m) tall before the hurricane of 1925, when it lost about 40 feet (12 m) in height. It had a circumference of 47 feet (14 m) and a diameter of 17.5 feet (5.3 m) and was estimated to be 3,500 years old. It was burned down accidentally in 2012.

== Taxonomy ==
The closely related Taxodium ascendens (pond cypress) is treated by some botanists as a distinct species, while others classify it as merely a variety of bald cypress, as Taxodium distichum var. imbricatum (Nutt.) Croom. It differs in shorter leaves borne on erect shoots, and in ecology, being largely confined to low-nutrient blackwater habitats. A few authors also treat Taxodium mucronatum as a variety of bald cypress, as T. distichum var. mexicanum Gordon, thereby considering the genus as comprising only one species.

== Habitat and distribution ==
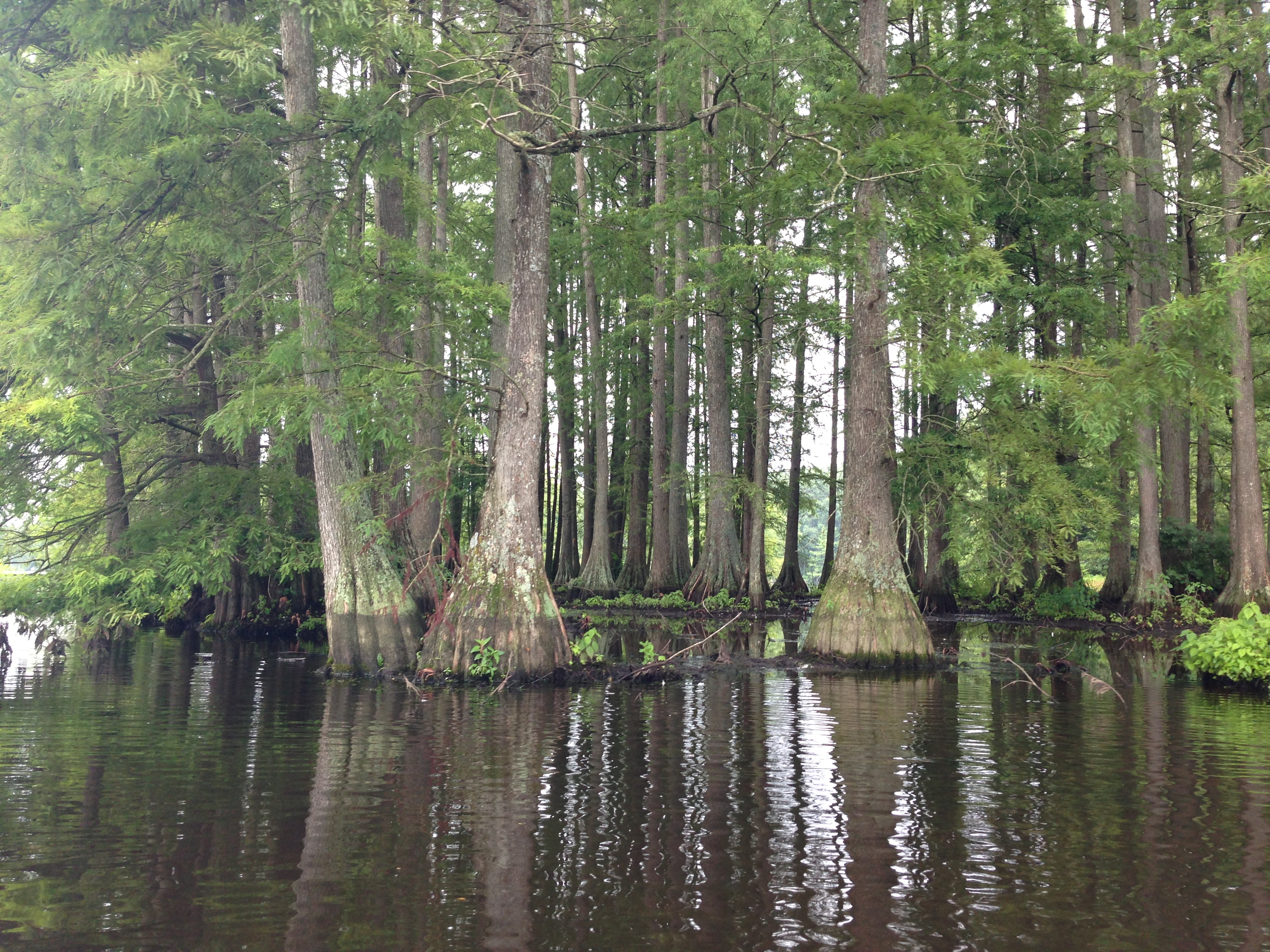
Bald cypress in Trap Pond State Park, Delaware

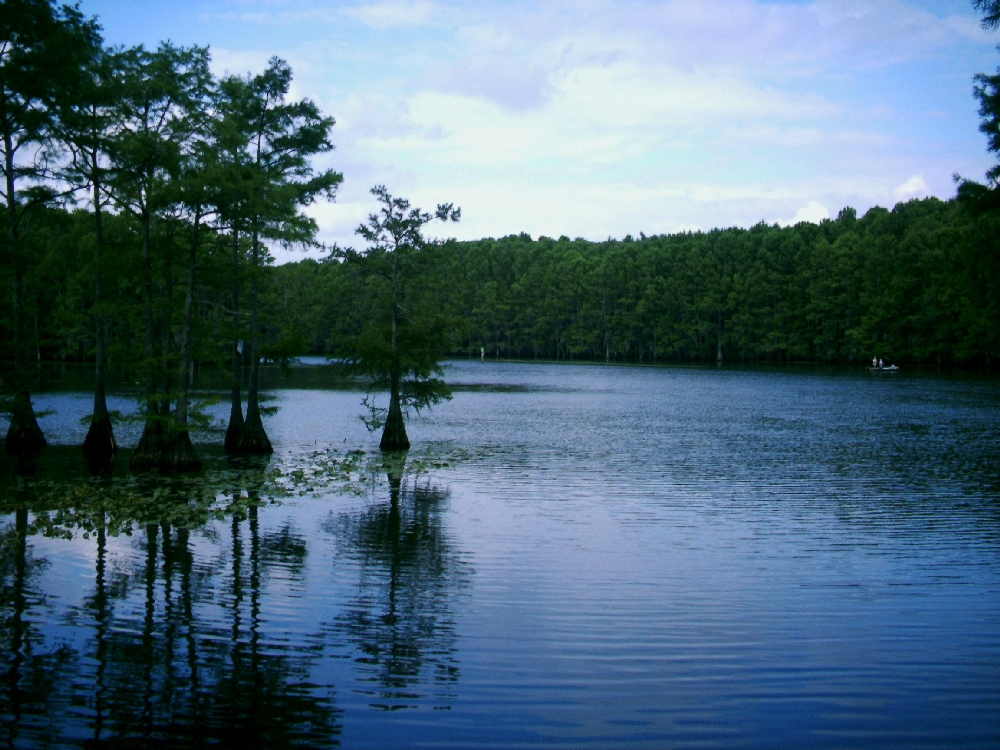
Bald cypress on the Texas side of Caddo Lake

The native range extends from southeastern New Jersey south to Florida and west to Central Texas and southeastern Oklahoma, and also inland up the Mississippi River to southernmost Illinois and Indiana. Ancient bald cypress forests, with some trees more than 1,700 years old, once dominated swamps in the Southeast. The original range had been thought to only reach as far north as Delaware, but researchers have now found a natural forest on the Cape May Peninsula in southern New Jersey. The species can also be found growing outside its natural native range, in New York and Pennsylvania.

The largest remaining old-growth stands are at Corkscrew Swamp Sanctuary, near Naples, Florida, and in the Three Sisters tract along eastern North Carolina's Black River. The Corkscrew trees are around 500 years of age, and some exceed 40 m (130 ft) in height. In 1985, the Black River trees were cored by a dendrochronologist from the University of Arkansas, who found that some began growing as early as 364 AD. A subsequent visit to the area in 2019 revealed a tree dated by its tree-ring count to 605 BC, ranking as the ninth-oldest tree in the world.

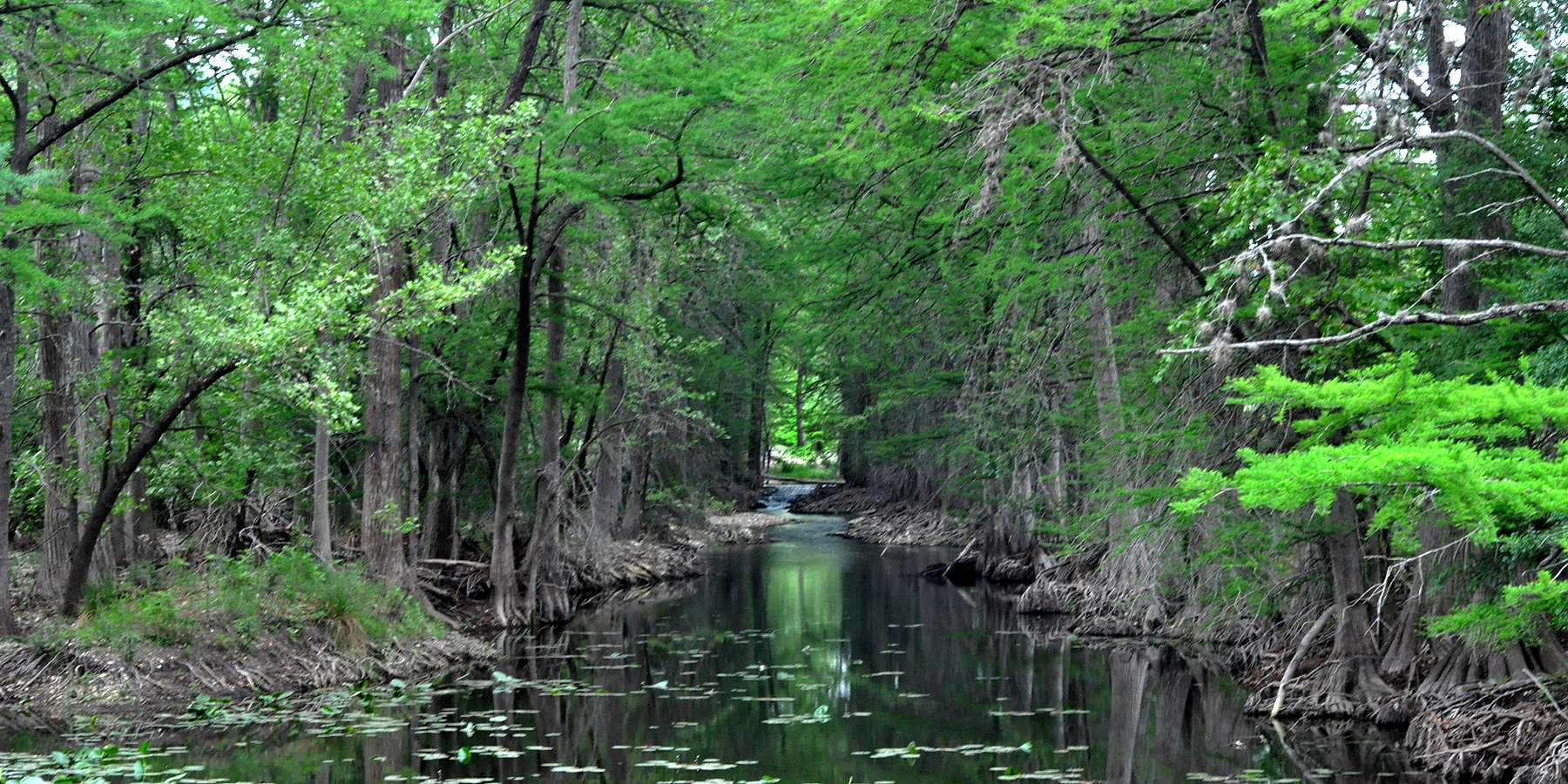
Bald cypress (Taxodium distichum) growing near the western extreme of its range on the Guadalupe River in the semi-arid Edwards Plateau, Kerr County, Texas (14 April 2012)

In 2012, scuba divers discovered an underwater cypress forest several miles off the coast of Mobile, Alabama, in 60 feet of water. The forest contains trees that could not be dated with radiocarbon methods, indicating that they are more than 50,000 years old and thus most likely lived in the early glacial interval of the last ice age. The cypress forest is well preserved, and when samples are cut, they still smell like fresh cypress. A team, which has not yet published its results in a peer-reviewed journal, is studying the site. One possibility is that Hurricane Katrina exposed the grove of bald cypress, which had been protected under ocean floor sediments.

== Reproduction and early growth ==
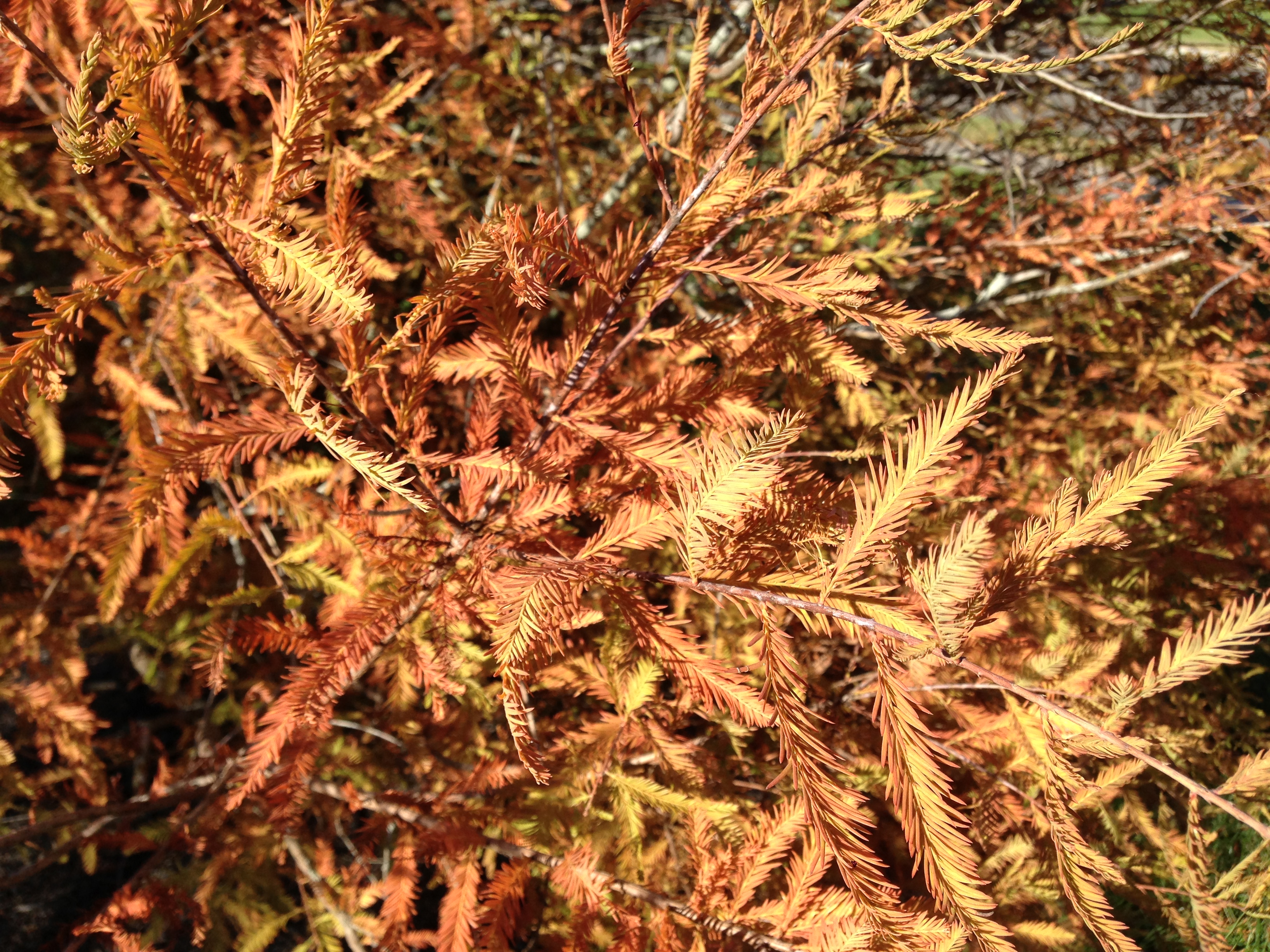
Foliage in autumn just before shedding

The bald cypress is monoecious. Male and female strobili mature in one growing season from buds formed the previous year. The male catkins are about 2 mm (0.079 in) in diameter and are borne in slender, purplish, drooping clusters 7 to 13 cm (2 3/4 to 5 in) long that are conspicuous during the winter on this deciduous conifer. Pollen is shed in March and April. Female conelets are found singly or in clusters of two or three. The globose cones turn from green to brownish-purple as they mature from October to December. The cones are 13 to 36 mm (0.51 to 1.42 in) in diameter and consist of 9 to 15 four-sided scales that break away irregularly after maturity. Each scale can bear two (rarely three) irregular, triangular seeds with thick, horny, warty coats and projecting flanges. The number of seeds per cone averages 16 and ranges from 2 to 34. Cleaned seeds number from about 5,600 to 18,430 per kg (2,540 to 8,360 per lb).

=== Seed production and dissemination ===
Some seeds are produced every year, and good seed crops occur at three- to five-year intervals. At maturity, the cone scales with their resin-coated seeds adhering to them, or sometimes entire cones, drop to the water or ground. This drop of mature seeds is often hastened by squirrels, which eat bald cypress seeds, but usually drop several scales with undamaged seeds still attached to each cone they pick. Floodwaters spread the scales or cones along streams and are the most important means of seed dissemination.

=== Seedling development ===
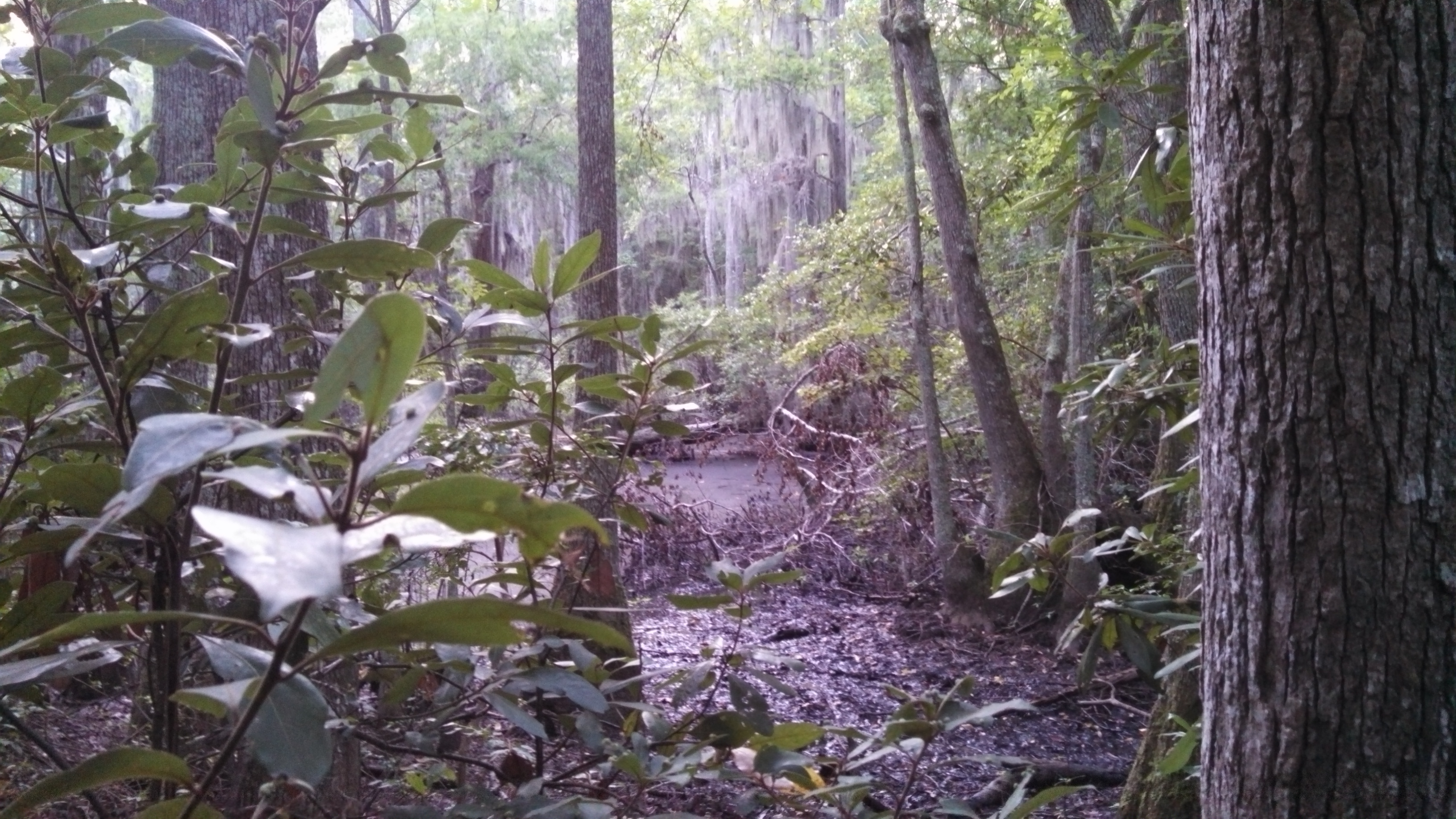
Bald cypress swamp and Spanish moss at First Landing State Park in Virginia Beach, Virginia

Germination is epigeal. Under swamp conditions, germination generally takes place on a sphagnum moss or a wet-muck seedbed. Seeds will not germinate under water, but some will remain viable for 30 months under water. By contrast, seeds usually fail to germinate on better drained soils because of the lack of surface water. Thus, a soil saturated but not flooded for a period of one to three months after seedfall is required for germination.

After germination, seedlings must grow fast enough to keep at least part of their crowns above floodwaters for most of the growing season. Bald cypress seedlings can endure partial shading, but require overhead light for good growth. Seedlings in swamps often reach heights of 20 to 75 cm (8 to 29.5 in) their first year. Growth is checked when a seedling is completely submerged by flooding, and prolonged submergence kills the seedling.

In nurseries, Taxodium distichum seeds show an apparent internal dormancy that can be overcome by various treatments, usually including cold stratification or submerging in water for 60 days. Nursery beds are sown in spring with pretreated seeds or in fall with untreated seeds. Seedlings usually reach 75 to 100 cm (29.5 to 39.5 in) in height during their first (and usually only) year in the nursery. Average size of 1-0 nursery-grown seedlings in a seed source test including 72 families was 81.4 cm (32.0 in) tall and 1.1 cm (0.43 in) in diameter.

Control of competing vegetation may be necessary for a year or more for bald cypress planted outside of swamps. Five years after planting on a harrowed and bedded, poorly drained site in Florida, survival was high, but heights had increased only 30 cm (12 in), probably because of heavy herbaceous competition. Seedlings grown in a crawfish pond in Louisiana, where weed control and soil moisture were excellent through June, averaged 2.9 m (9.5 ft) and 3.5 cm (1.4 in) diameter at breast height after five years. However, a replicate of the same sources planted in an old soybean field, where weed control and soil moisture were poor, resulted in the same diameter, but a smaller average seedling height of 2.1 m (6.9 ft). When planted in a residential yard and weeded and watered, they averaged 3.7 m (12 ft) tall three years later.

=== Vegetative reproduction ===
Bald cypress is one of the few conifer species that sprouts. Thrifty sprouts are generally produced from stumps of young trees, but trees up to 60 years old also send up healthy sprouts if the trees are cut during the fall or winter. However, survival of these sprouts is often poor, and those that live are usually poorly shaped and do not make quality saw timber trees. Stumps of trees up to 200 years old may also sprout, but the sprouts are not as vigorous and are more subject to wind damage as the stump decays. Successful vegetative propagation has been recorded when cuttings were not wounded, treated with 15,000 mg/L of Indole-3-butyric acid, and grown in a substrate with intermediate water-holding capacity.

== Ecology ==
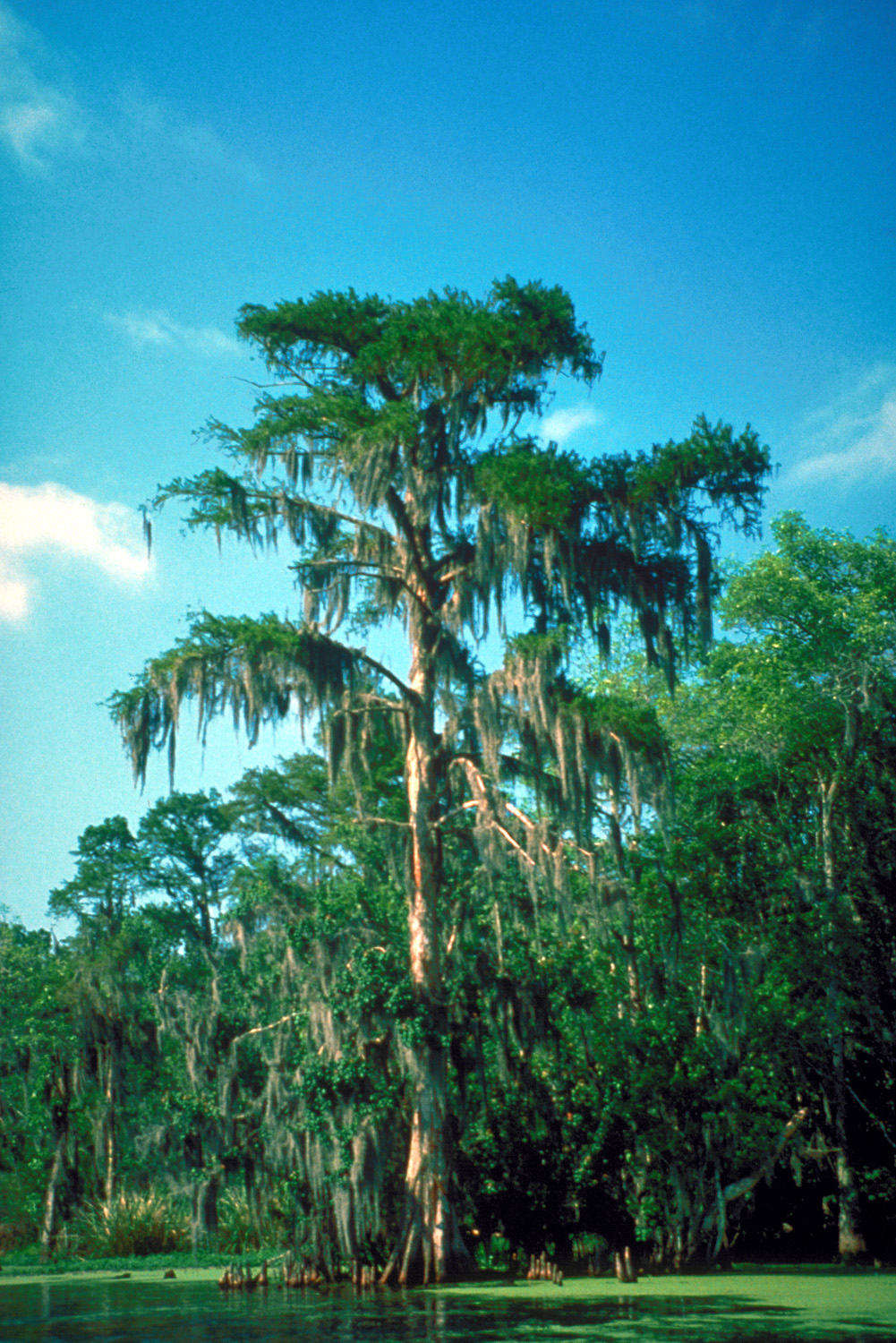
A bald cypress in the Atchafalaya Basin of Louisiana

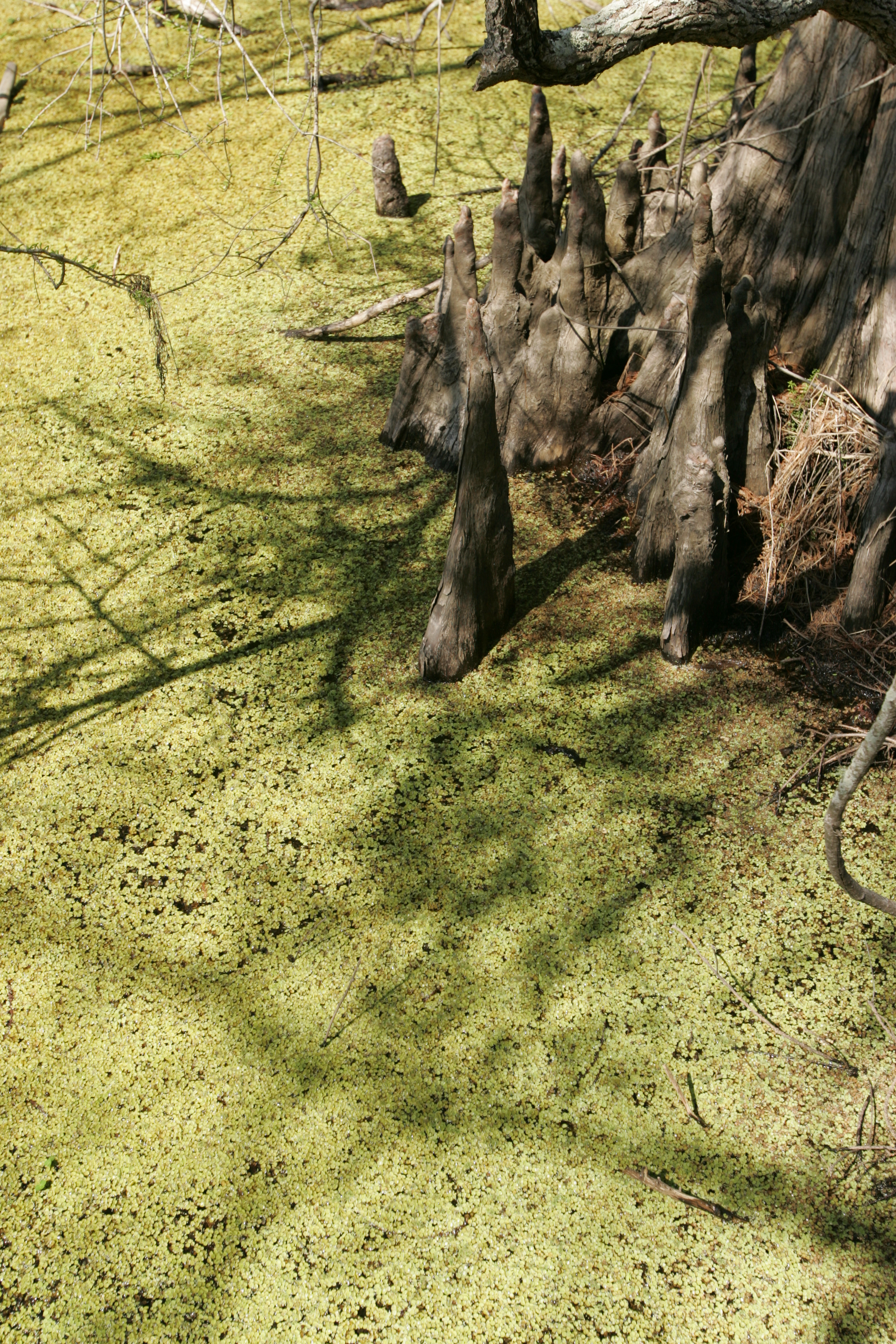
Bald cypress knees in duckweed

The seeds remain viable for less than one year, and are dispersed in two ways. One is by water: the seeds float and move on water until flooding recedes or the cone is deposited on shore. The second is by wildlife: squirrels eat seeds, but often drop some scales from the cones they harvest. Seeds do not germinate under water and rarely germinate on well-drained soils; seedlings normally become established on continuously saturated, but not flooded, soils for one to three months. After germination, seedlings must grow quickly to escape floodwaters; they often reach a height of 20–75 cm (up to 100 cm in fertilized nursery conditions) in their first year. Seedlings die if inundated for more than about two to four weeks. Natural regeneration is therefore prevented on sites that are always flooded during the growing season. Although vigorous saplings and stump sprouts can produce viable seed, most specimens do not produce seed until they are about 30 years old. In good conditions, bald cypress grows fairly fast when young, then more slowly with age. Trees have been measured to reach 3 m (9.8 ft) in five years, 21 m (69 ft) in 41 years, and 36 m (118 ft) in height in 96 years; height growth has largely ceased by the time the trees are 200 years old. Some individuals can live over 1,000 years. Determination of the age of an old tree may be difficult because of frequent missing or false rings of stemwood caused by variable and stressful growing environments.

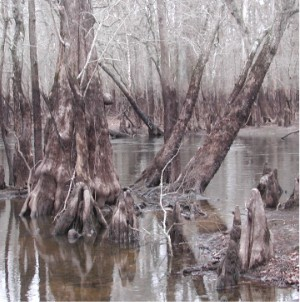
Bald cypress forest in winter, showing "knees" and (brown) high flood level, Lynches River, Johnsonville, South Carolina

Bald cypress trees growing in swamps have a peculiarity of growth called cypress knees. These are woody projections from the root system project above the ground or water. Their function was once thought to be to provide oxygen to the roots, which grow in the low dissolved oxygen waters typical of a swamp (as in mangroves). However, evidence for this is scant; in fact, roots of swamp-dwelling specimens whose knees are removed do not decrease in oxygen content and the trees continue to thrive. Another more likely function is structural support and stabilization. Bald cypress trees growing on flood-prone sites tend to form buttressed bases, but trees grown on drier sites may lack this feature. The buttressed base usually begins at the soil surface and usually extends up to the maximum annual flooding elevation. Buttressed bases and a strong, intertwined root system allow them to resist very strong winds; even hurricanes rarely overturn them.

Many agents damage T. distichum trees. The main damaging (in some cases lethal) agent is the fungus Lauriliella taxodii, which causes a brown pocket rot known as "pecky cypress". It attacks the heartwood of living trees, usually from the crown down to the roots. A few other fungi attack the sapwood and the heartwood of the tree, but they do not usually cause serious damage. Insects such as the cypress flea beetle (Systena marginalis) and the bald cypress leafroller (Archips goyerana) can seriously damage trees by destroying leaves, cones, or bark. Nutrias also clip and unroot young bald cypress seedlings, sometimes killing a whole plantation in a short amount of time.

In 2002, the Indiana Department of Natural Resources identified T. distichum as a state-protected plant with the status of Threatened. Globally, the species is listed as of Least Concern by the IUCN.

== Cultivation and uses ==
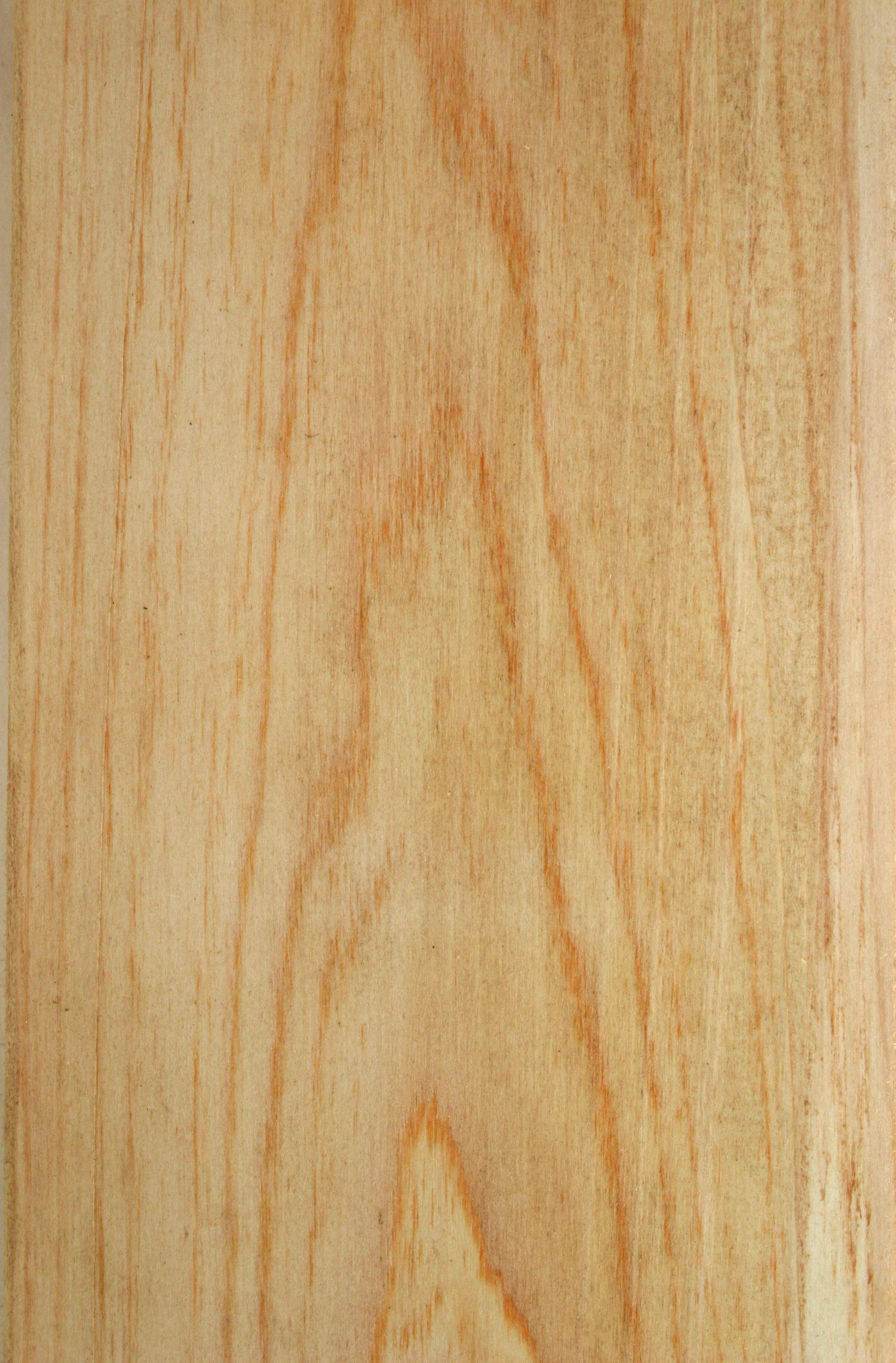
Timber

The bald cypress is hardy and can be planted in hardiness zones 4 through 10 in the US or prehaps even down to USDA zone 11. The species is a popular ornamental tree that is cultivated for its light, feathery foliage and orangey brown to dull red autumnal color. In cultivation it thrives on a wide range of soils, including well-drained sites where it would not grow naturally because juvenile seedlings cannot compete with other vegetation. Cultivation is successful far north of its native range, even to southern Canada. It is also commonly planted in Europe, Asia, and other temperate and subtropical locales. Additionally it is sometimes planted in gardens and parks Eastern Australia with most specimens being found in Temperate to warm temperate areas although two trees are thriving in an open location along a drain on the side of the highway north of Port Douglas Queensland (the tree itself is at a latitude and longitude of-16.4853970, 145.4134609), so it would seem the species can grow well in tropical conditions. It does, however, require hot summers for good growth.

When planted in locales with the cool summers of oceanic climates, growth is healthy but very slow; some specimens in northeastern England have only grown to 4–5 m (13–16 ft) tall in 50 years and do not produce cones. One of the oldest specimens in Europe was planted in the 1900s in the Arboretum de Pézanin in Burgundy, France. An alley of Louisiana cypress trees was planted in the 18th century in the park of the Château de Rambouillet, southwest of Paris.

Bald cypress has great merchantable yields. In virgin stands, yields from 112 to 196 m^{3}/ha were common, and some stands may have exceeded 1,000 m^{3}/ha.

== Building material ==
Still usable prehistoric wood is often found in swamps as far north as New Jersey, and occasionally as far north as Connecticut, although it is more common in the southeastern states. This partially mineralized wood is harvested from swamps in the southeastern states, and is greatly prized for special uses such as for carvings. The fungus Lauriliella taxodii causes a specific form of the wood called "pecky cypress", which is used for decorative wall paneling.

The bald cypress was used by Native Americans to create coffins, homes, drums, and canoes. Joshua D. Brown, the first settler of Kerrville, Texas, made his living producing shingles from bald cypress trees that grew along the Guadalupe River of the Texas Hill Country.

In the southern United States, the odorless wood, which closely resembles that of other Cupressus species, has been valued since colonial times for its resistance to water, making it ideal for use wherever the wood is exposed to the elements. In the first half of the 20th century, it was marketed as "The Wood Eternal".

The lumber is valuable for timber framing, building materials, fence posts, planking in boats, river pilings, doors, blinds, flooring, shingles, garden boxes, caskets, interior trim, and cabinetry.

Bald cypress timbers are commonly available in lengths up to 24 feet. This species enjoys predictable lead times for projects. The wood is a very light tan in color and weathers to a uniform silvery gray. Paint and stains adhere well to Bald cypress. Bald cypress most often sees use in outdoor structures such as timber frame pavilions, mid-size farmers' markets, porches, exterior awnings, and decorative trusses where its weather resistance helps ensure long life.

== Gallery ==
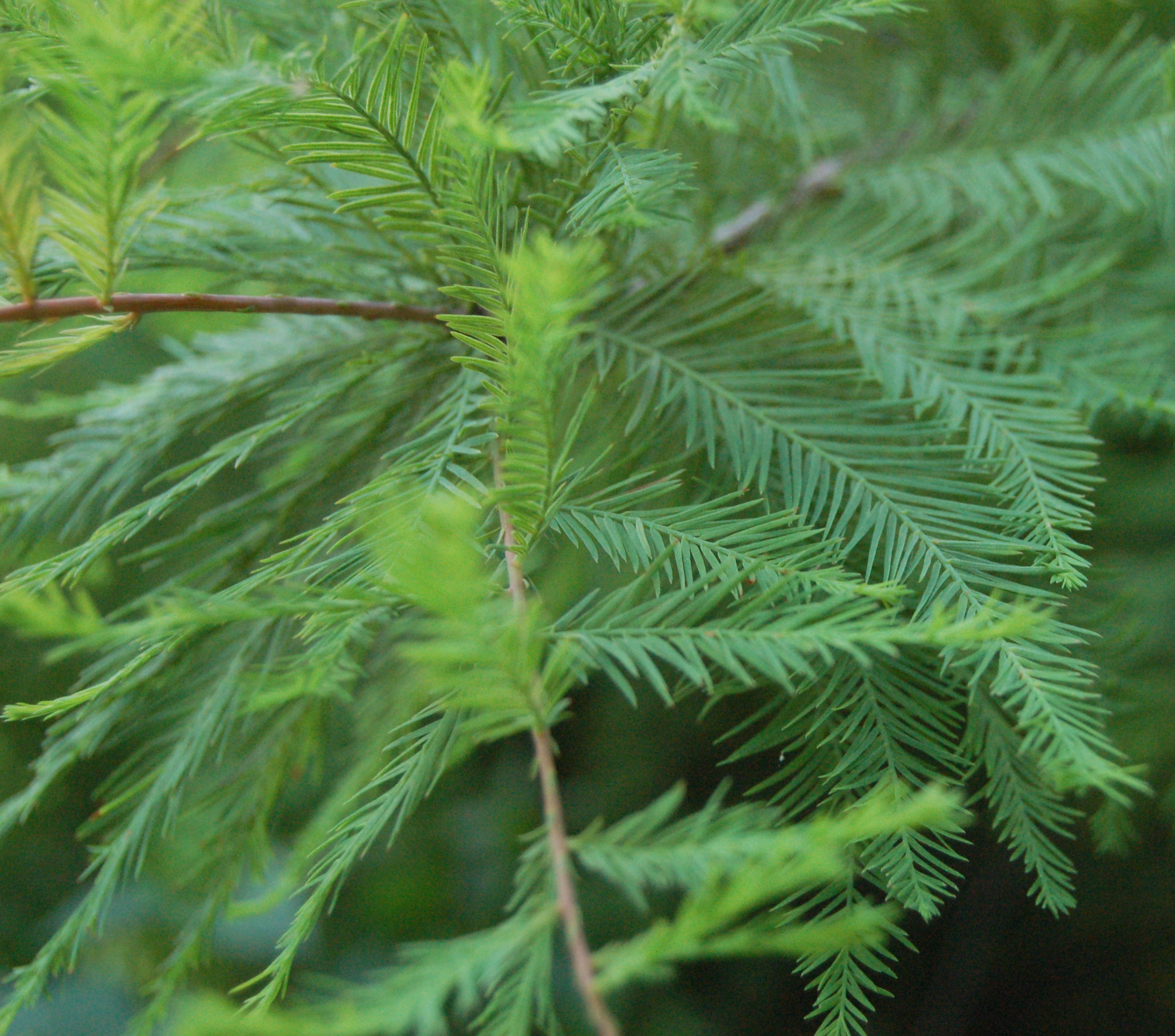
Foliage

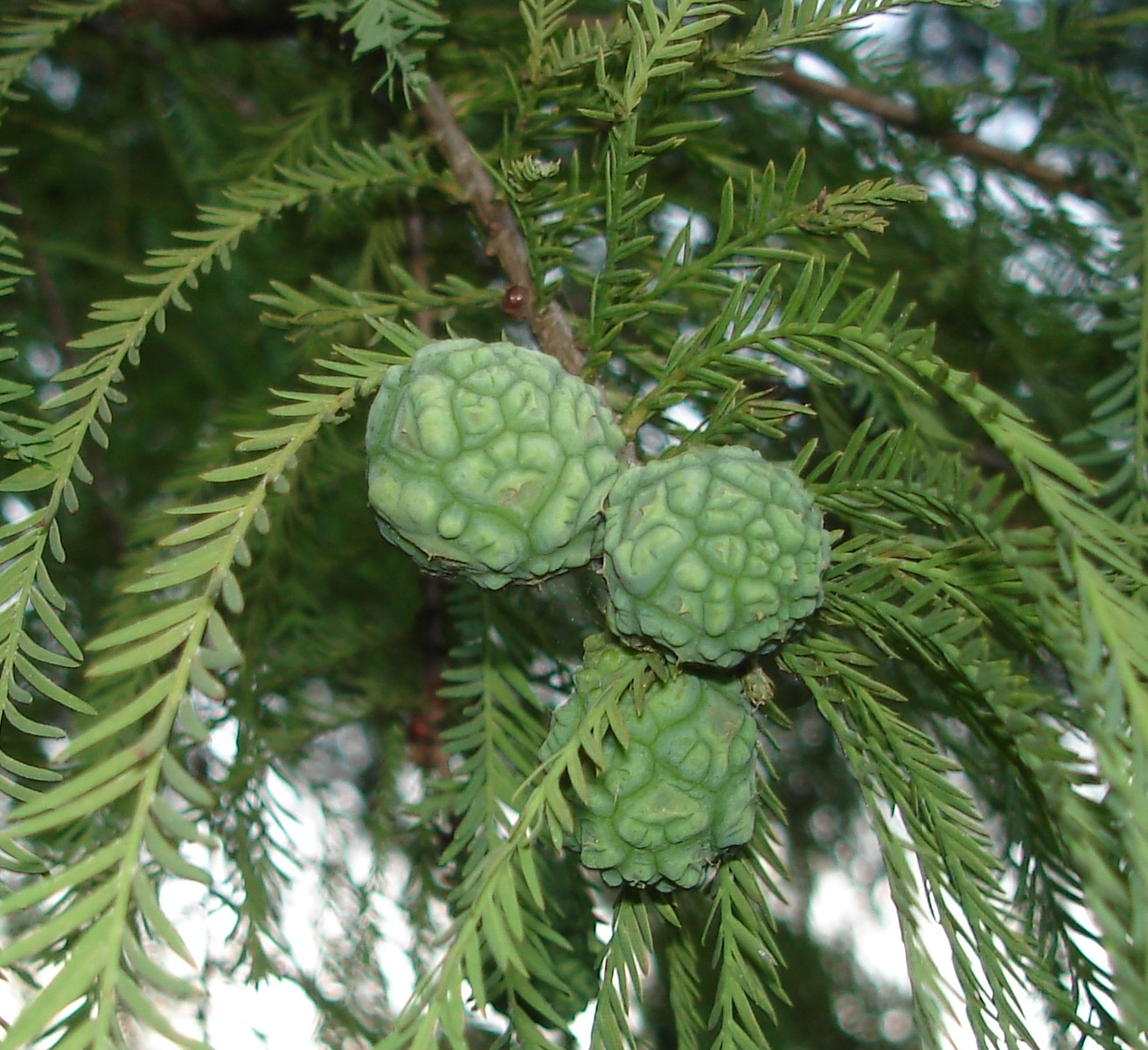
Cones

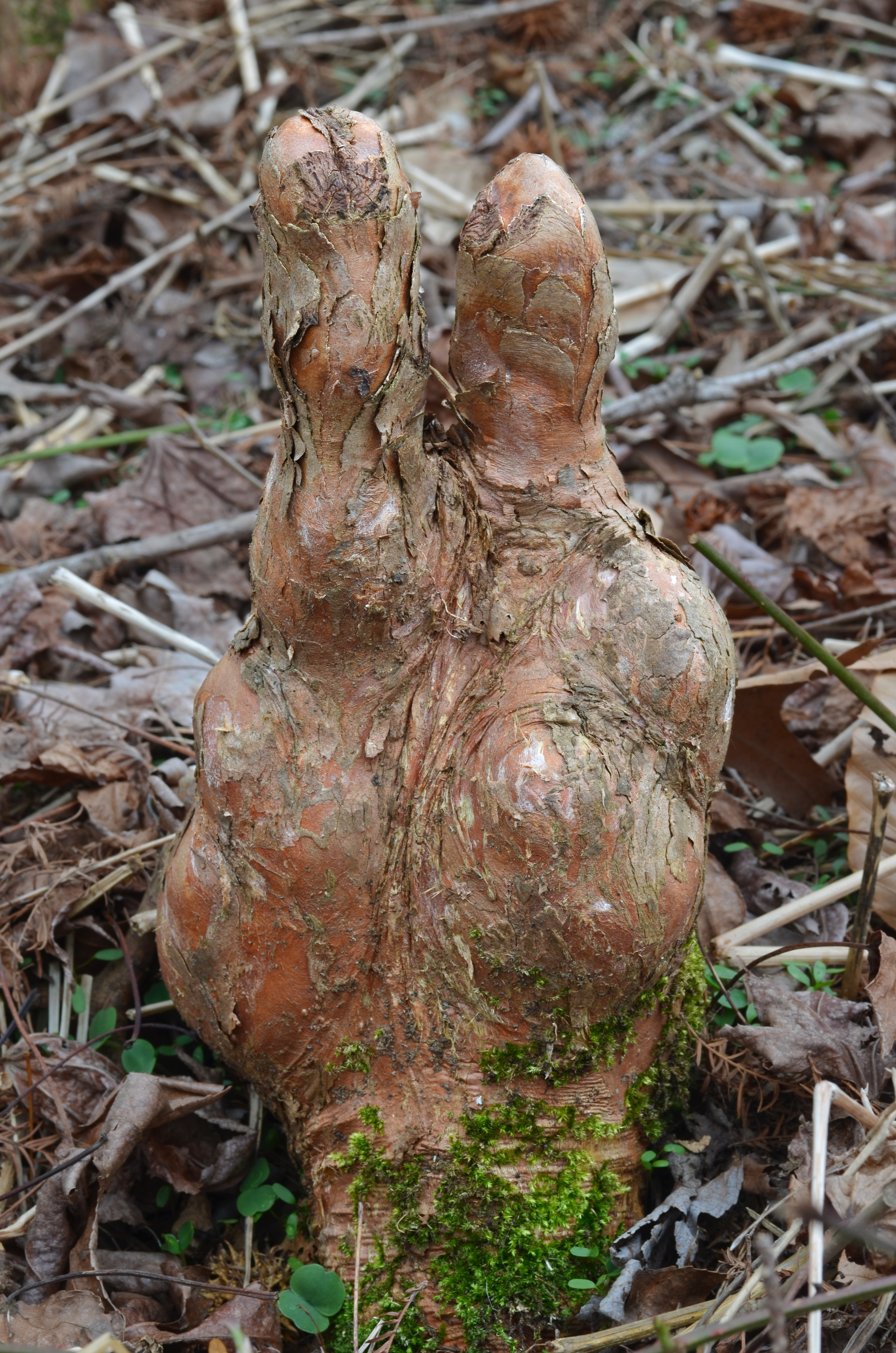
Knees

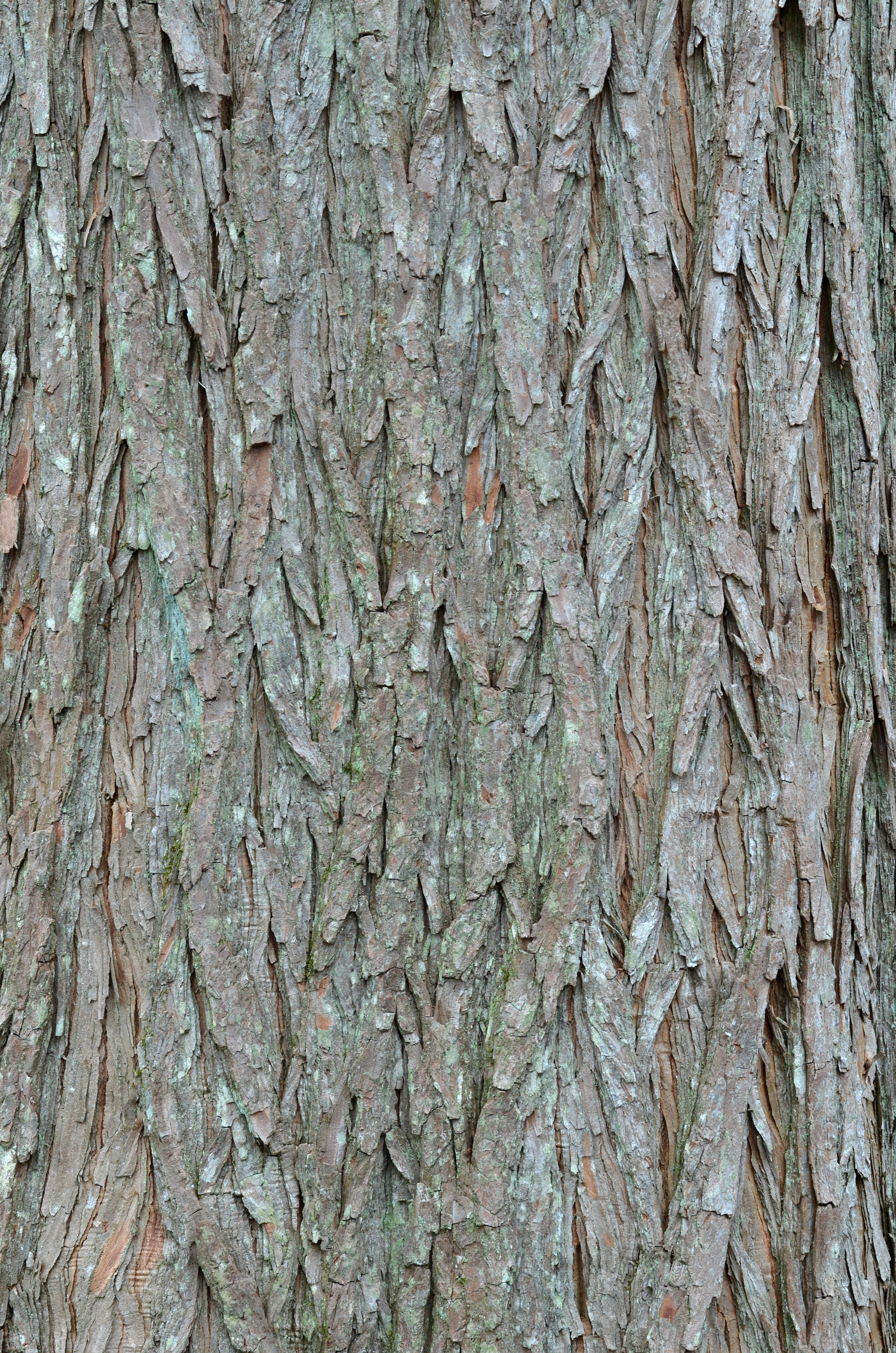
Bark

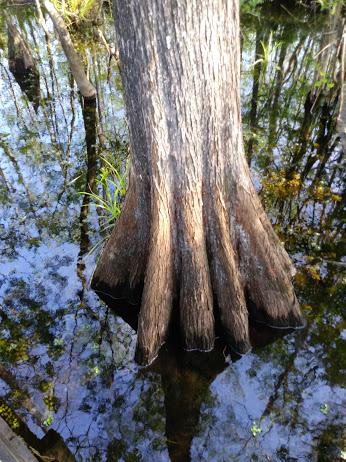
Detail of lower trunk and buttresses

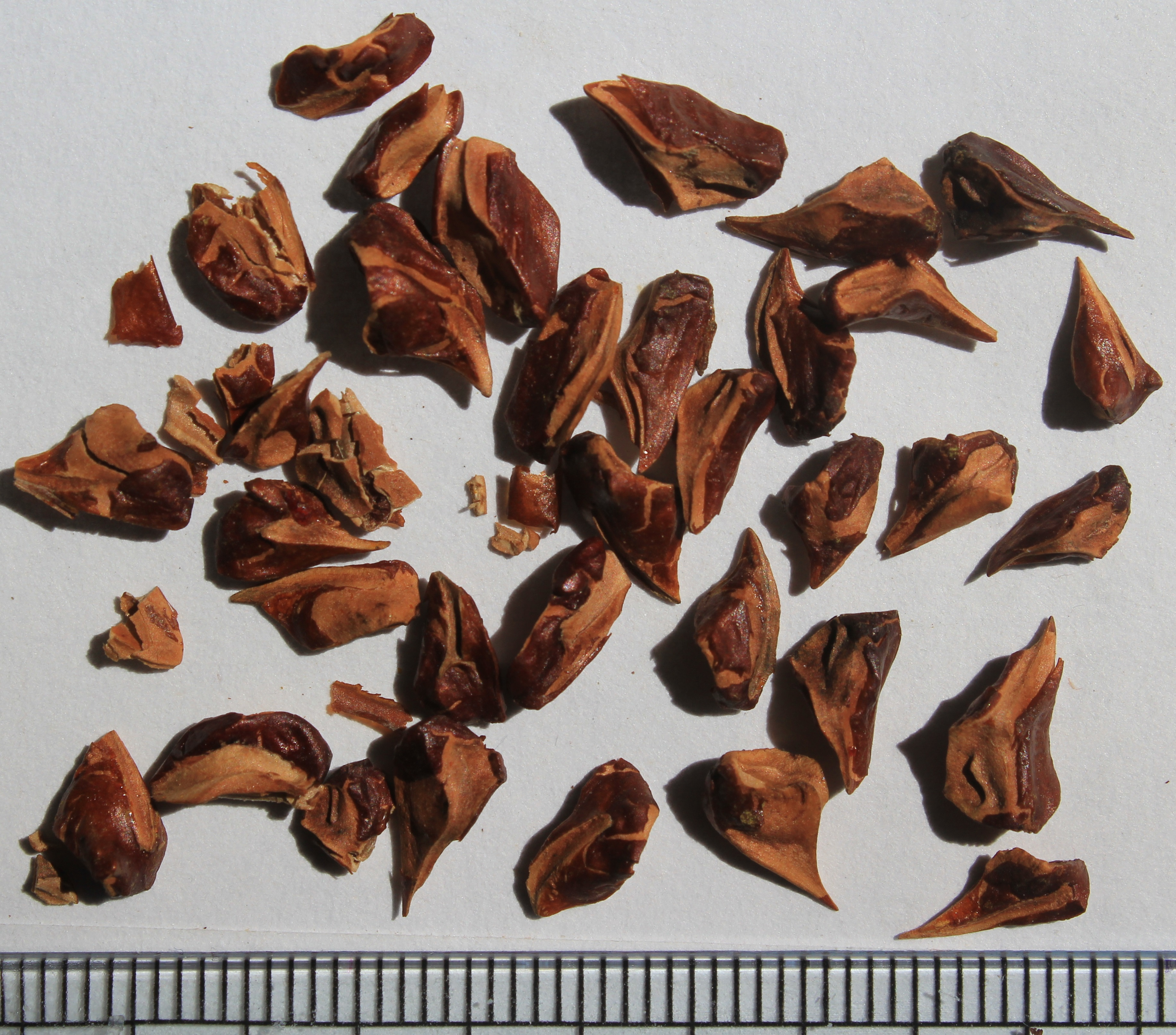
Seeds

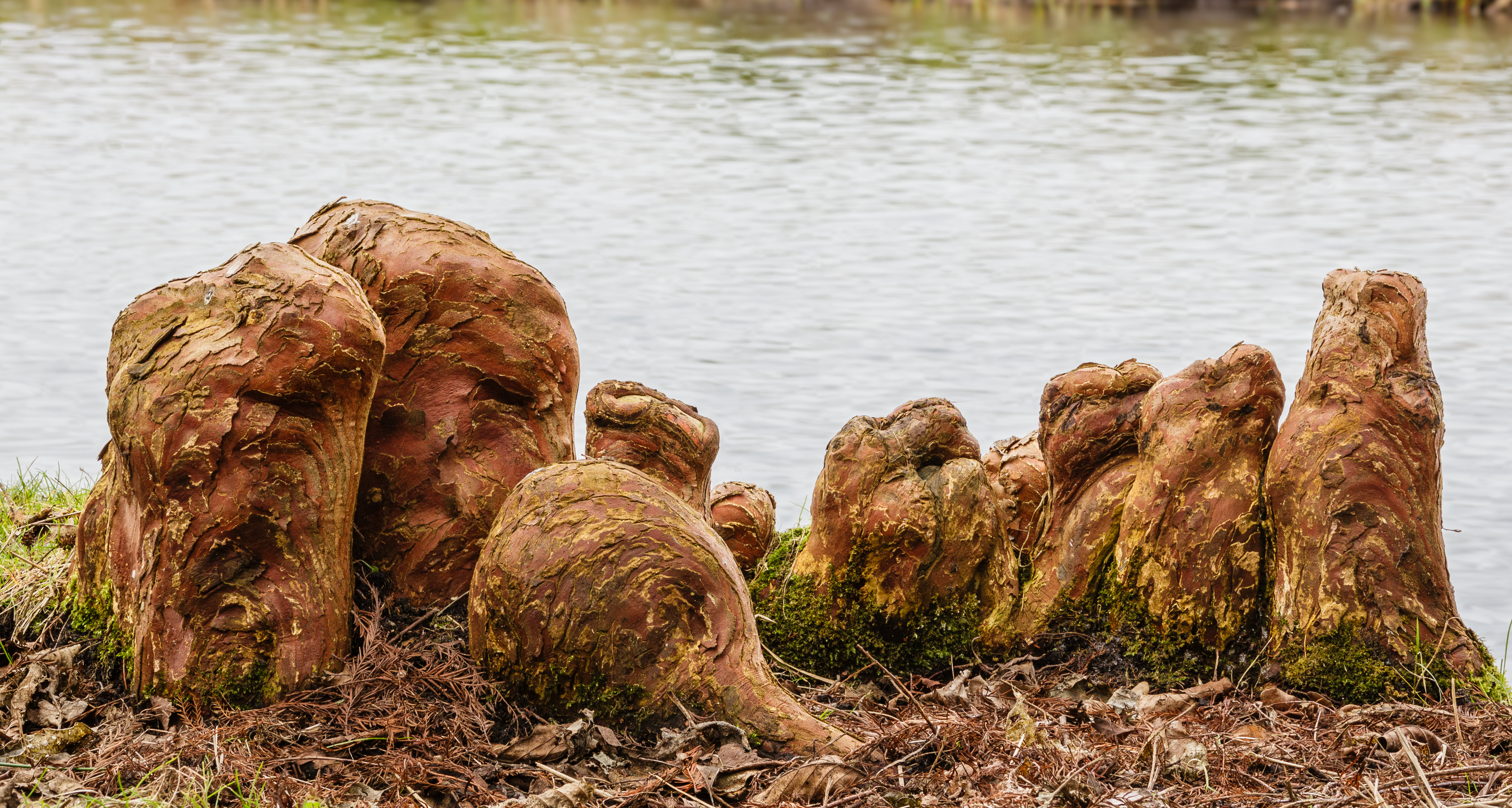
Cluster of breath roots (pneumatophores)

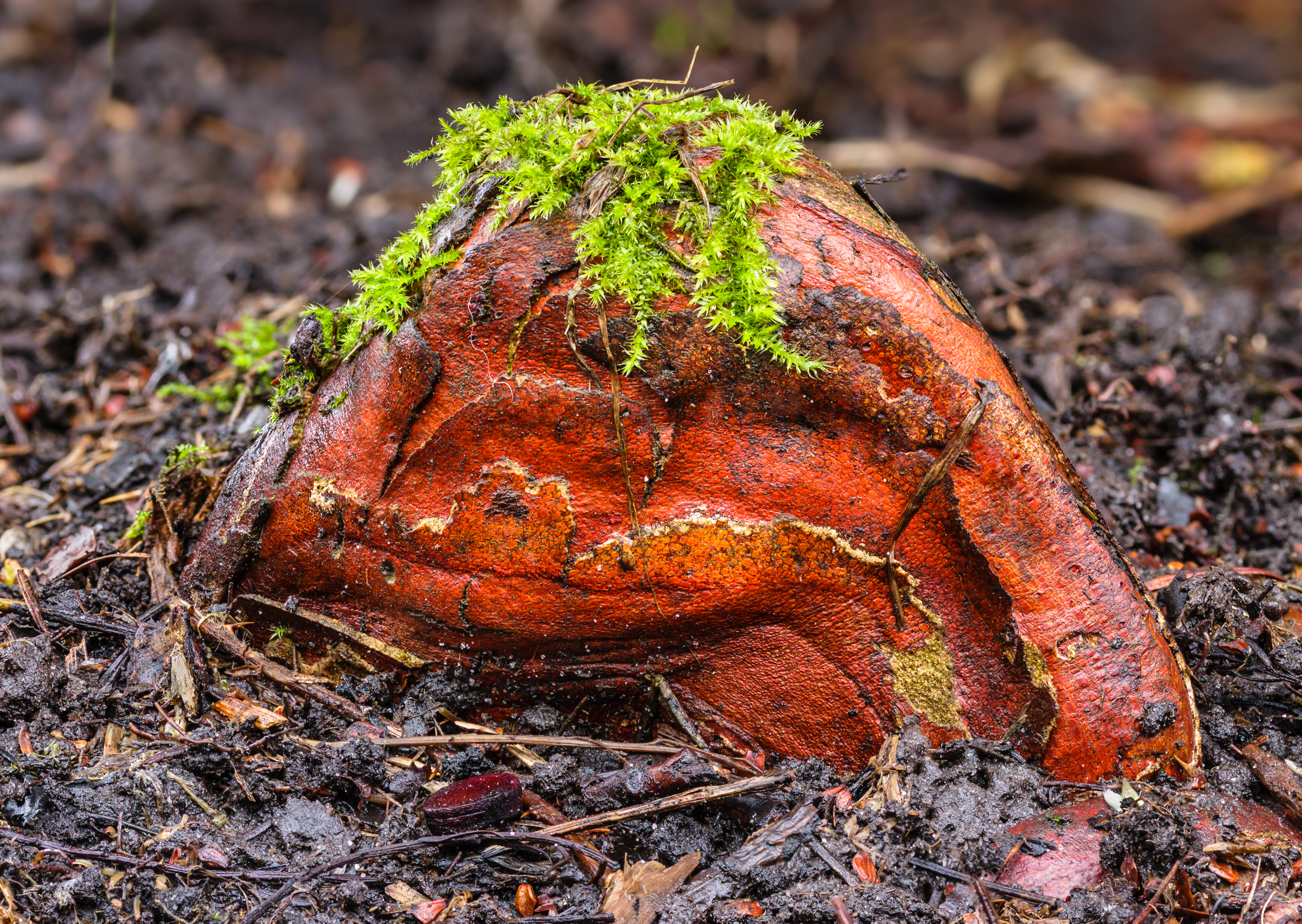
Young breath root

== See also ==
- Saltwater swamp
