= Systena gracilenta =

Scientific classification
- Kingdom: Animalia
- Phylum: Arthropoda
- Class: Insecta
- Order: Coleoptera
- Suborder: Polyphaga
- Infraorder: Cucujiformia
- Family: Chrysomelidae
- Tribe: Alticini
- Genus: Systena
- Species: S. gracilenta

Binomial name
- Systena gracilenta Blake, 1933

Species of beetle

Systena gracilenta is a species of flea beetle in the family Chrysomelidae. It is found in Central America and North America.
