= Systena laevis =

Scientific classification
- Kingdom: Animalia
- Phylum: Arthropoda
- Class: Insecta
- Order: Coleoptera
- Suborder: Polyphaga
- Infraorder: Cucujiformia
- Family: Chrysomelidae
- Genus: Systena
- Species: S. laevis

Binomial name
- Systena laevis Blake, 1935

Species of beetle

Systena laevis is a species of flea beetle in the family Chrysomelidae. It is found in North America.
