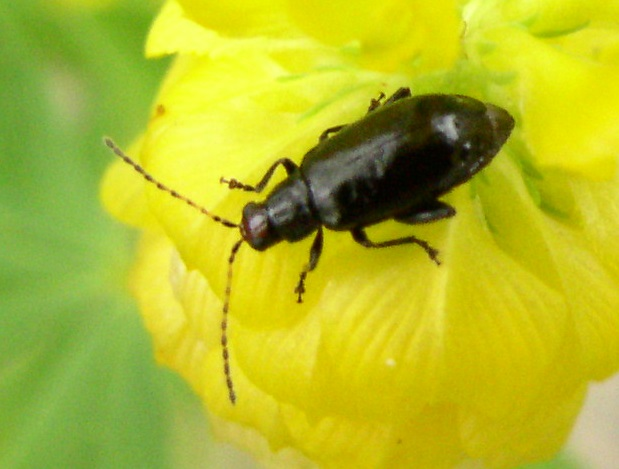

Scientific classification
- Kingdom: Animalia
- Phylum: Arthropoda
- Class: Insecta
- Order: Coleoptera
- Suborder: Polyphaga
- Infraorder: Cucujiformia
- Family: Chrysomelidae
- Genus: Systena
- Species: S. hudsonias

Binomial name
- Systena hudsonias (Forster, 1771)

= Systena hudsonias =

Species of beetle

Systena hudsonias, the black-headed flea beetle, is a species of flea beetle in the family Chrysomelidae. It is found in North America. It is poliphagos, it feeds on plants of seventeen different plant families.
