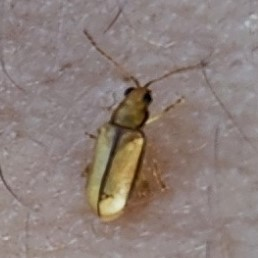

Scientific classification
- Kingdom: Animalia
- Phylum: Arthropoda
- Class: Insecta
- Order: Coleoptera
- Suborder: Polyphaga
- Infraorder: Cucujiformia
- Family: Chrysomelidae
- Genus: Systena
- Species: S. plicata

Binomial name
- Systena plicata Blatchley, 1921

= Systena plicata =

Species of beetle

Systena plicata is a species of flea beetle in the family Chrysomelidae. It can be found in the southeast and midwestern states of the United States and in Alachua, Columbia and Okaloosa counties in Florida.
