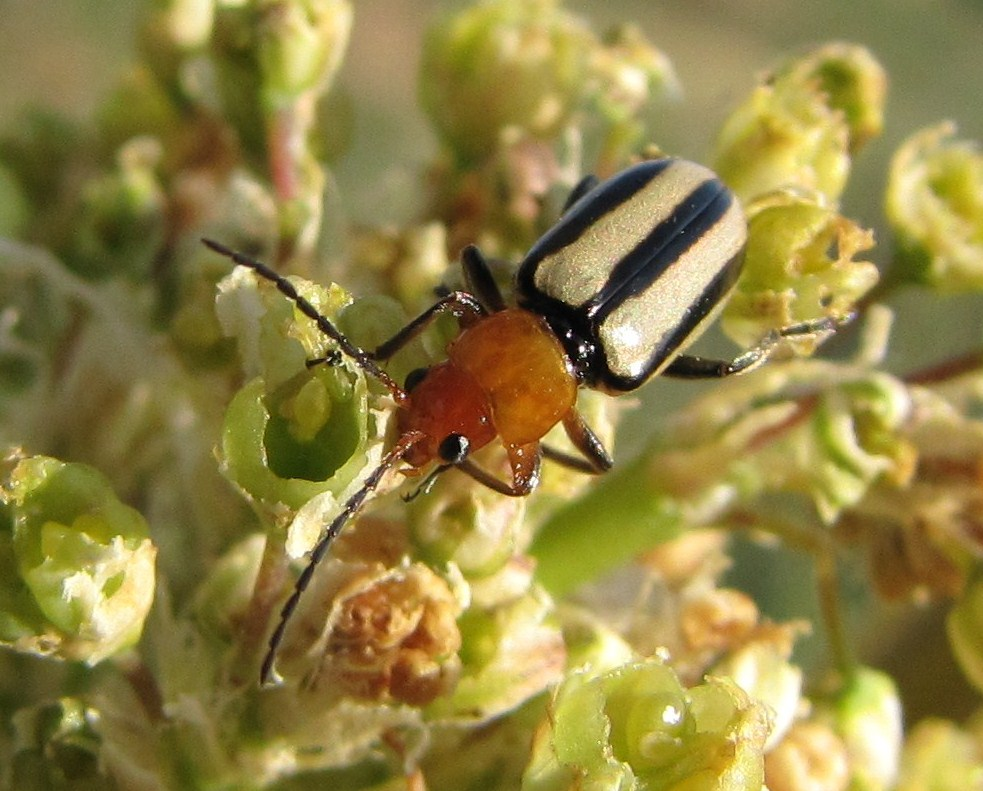

Scientific classification
- Kingdom: Animalia
- Phylum: Arthropoda
- Class: Insecta
- Order: Coleoptera
- Suborder: Polyphaga
- Infraorder: Cucujiformia
- Family: Chrysomelidae
- Tribe: Alticini
- Genus: Systena
- Species: S. blanda

Binomial name
- Systena blanda F. E. Melsheimer, 1847

= Systena blanda =

Species of beetle

Systena blanda, the palestriped flea beetle, is a species of flea beetle in the family Chrysomelidae. It is found in Central America, North America, and Oceania.
