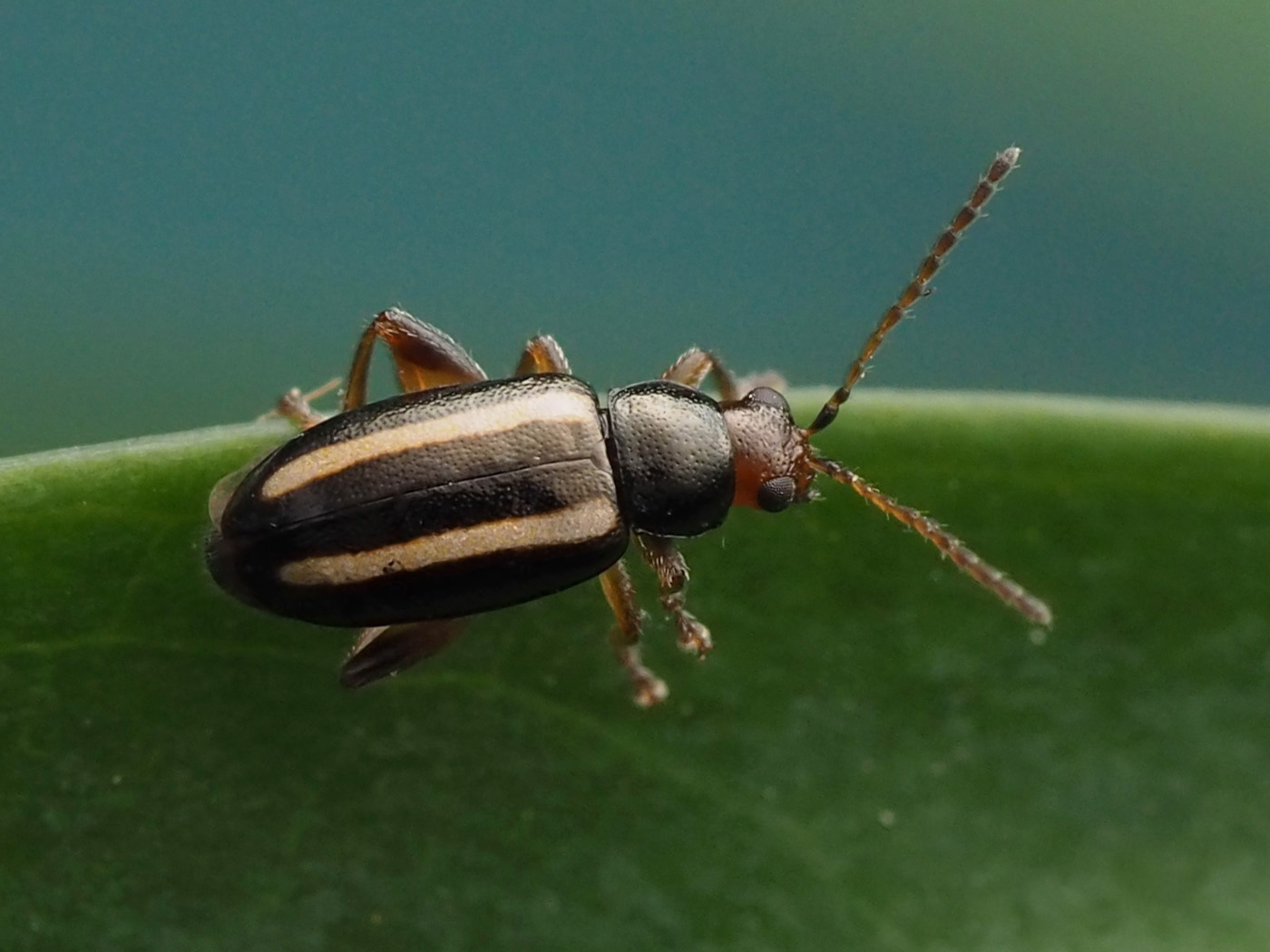

Scientific classification
- Kingdom: Animalia
- Phylum: Arthropoda
- Clade: Pancrustacea
- Class: Insecta
- Order: Coleoptera
- Suborder: Polyphaga
- Infraorder: Cucujiformia
- Family: Chrysomelidae
- Genus: Systena
- Species: S. elongata

Binomial name
- Systena elongata (Fabricius, 1798)

= Systena elongata =

Species of beetle

Systena elongata, the elongate flea beetle, is a species of flea beetle in the family Chrysomelidae. It is found in North America.
