= Systena dimorpha =

Scientific classification
- Kingdom: Animalia
- Phylum: Arthropoda
- Class: Insecta
- Order: Coleoptera
- Suborder: Polyphaga
- Infraorder: Cucujiformia
- Family: Chrysomelidae
- Genus: Systena
- Species: S. dimorpha

Binomial name
- Systena dimorpha Blake, 1933

Species of beetle

Systena dimorpha is a species of flea beetle in the family Chrysomelidae. This species is known from western Canada to South Dakota, south to Kansas and west to California.
