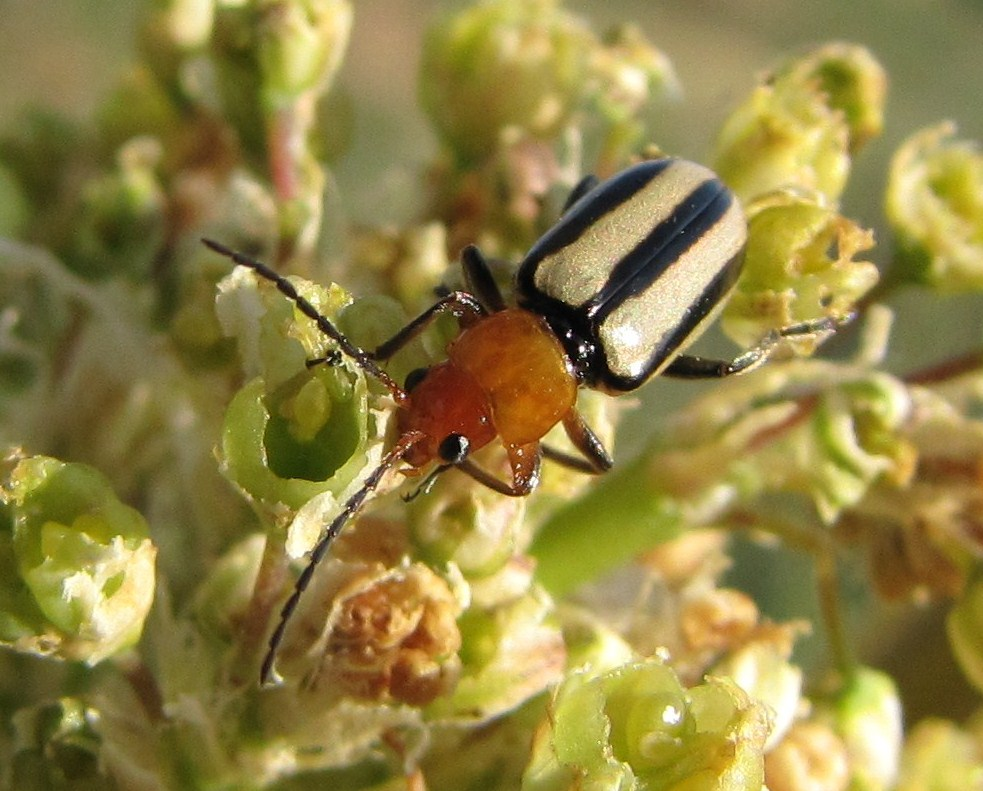
- Systena blanda

Scientific classification
- Kingdom: Animalia
- Phylum: Arthropoda
- Class: Insecta
- Order: Coleoptera
- Suborder: Polyphaga
- Infraorder: Cucujiformia
- Family: Chrysomelidae
- Tribe: Alticini
- Genus: Systena; Chevrolat in Dejean, 1836

= Systena =

Genus of flea beetles

Systena is a genus of flea beetles in the family Chrysomelidae. There are about 90 described species, found in the New World, mostly in the Neotropics.

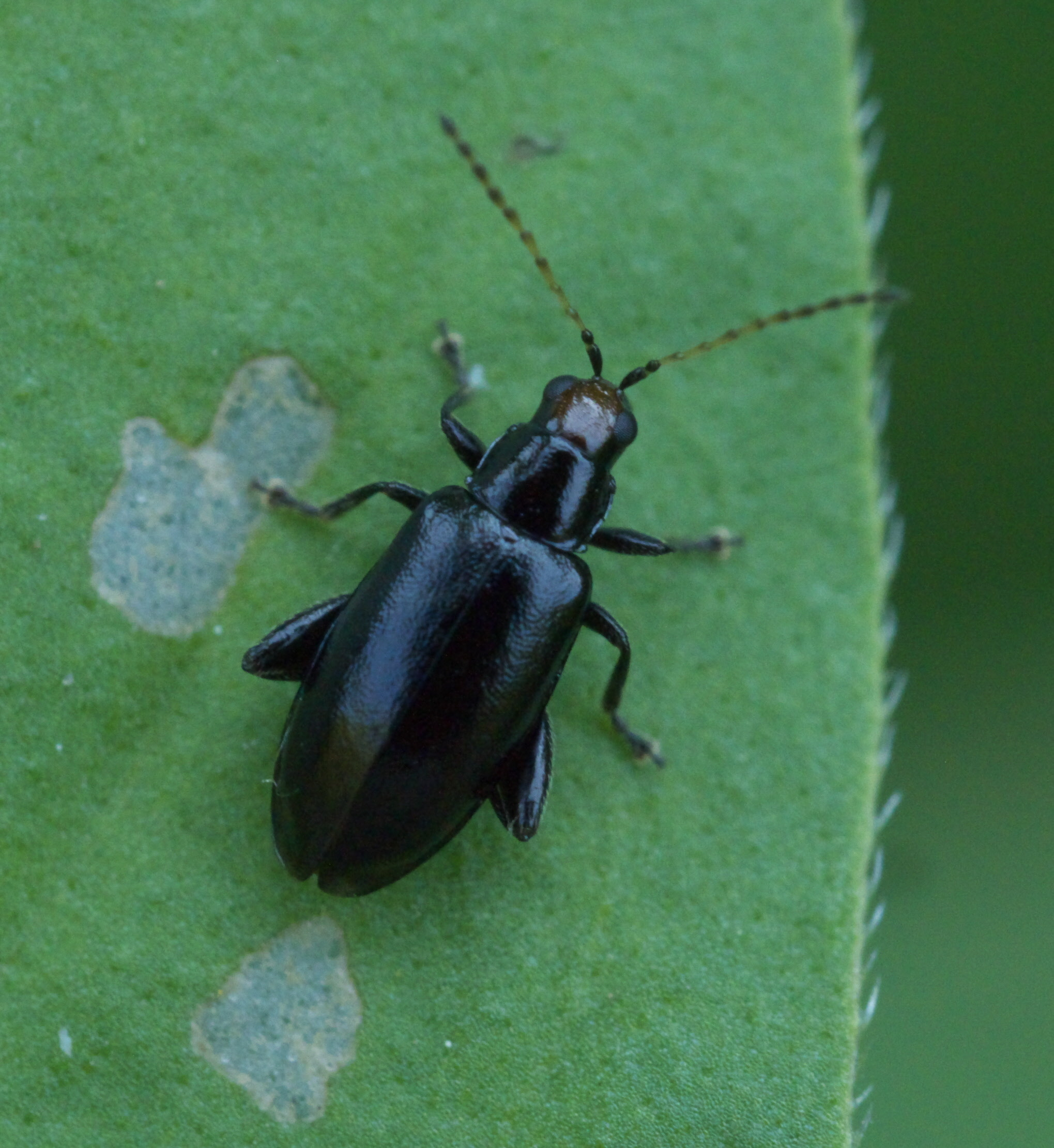
Systena frontalis

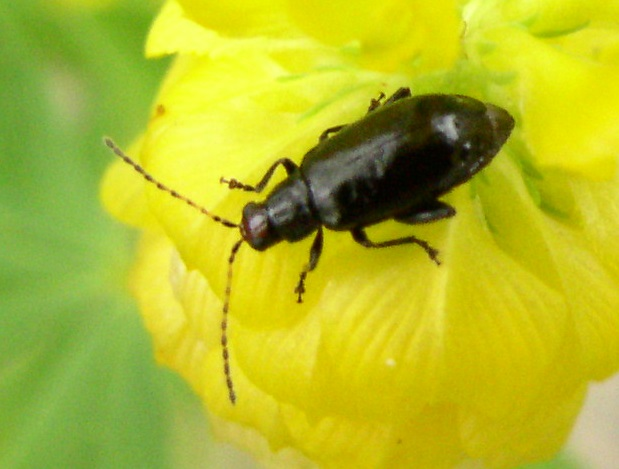
Systena hudsonias

== Selected species ==
- Systena bitaeniata (J. L. LeConte, 1859)
- Systena blanda F. E. Melsheimer, 1847 (palestriped flea beetle)
- Systena californica Blake, 1935
- Systena carri Blake, 1935
- Systena collaris Crotch, 1873
- Systena corni Schaeffer, 1932 (dogwood systena)
- Systena dimorpha Blake, 1933
- Systena elongata (Fabricius, 1798) (elongate flea beetle)
- Systena frontalis (Fabricius, 1801) (red-headed flea beetle)
- Systena gracilenta Blake, 1933
- Systena hudsonias (Forster, 1771) (black-headed flea beetle)
- Systena laevis Blake, 1935
- Systena laurentia Bechyné, 1955
- Systena lherminieri Bryant, 1942
- Systena marginalis (Illiger, 1807) (margined systena)
- Systena mitis (J. L. LeConte, 1858)
- Systena pallicornis Schaeffer, 1906
- Systena pallipes Schwarz, 1878
- Systena plicata Blatchley, 1921
- Systena sexnotata Fall, 1910
- Systena s-littera (Linnaeus, 1758)
- Systena variata Schaeffer, 1932
