= Systena sexnotata =

Scientific classification
- Kingdom: Animalia
- Phylum: Arthropoda
- Class: Insecta
- Order: Coleoptera
- Suborder: Polyphaga
- Infraorder: Cucujiformia
- Family: Chrysomelidae
- Genus: Systena
- Species: S. sexnotata

Binomial name
- Systena sexnotata Fall, 1910

Species of beetle

Systena sexnotata is a species of flea beetle in the family Chrysomelidae. S. sexnotata is found in North America. This species lives in Central Texas and Western Texas. They feed on walnuts (Juglandaeae) while larvae feed on roots. This species can grow to a body length of 4.8 millimeters to 5.5 millimeters.
