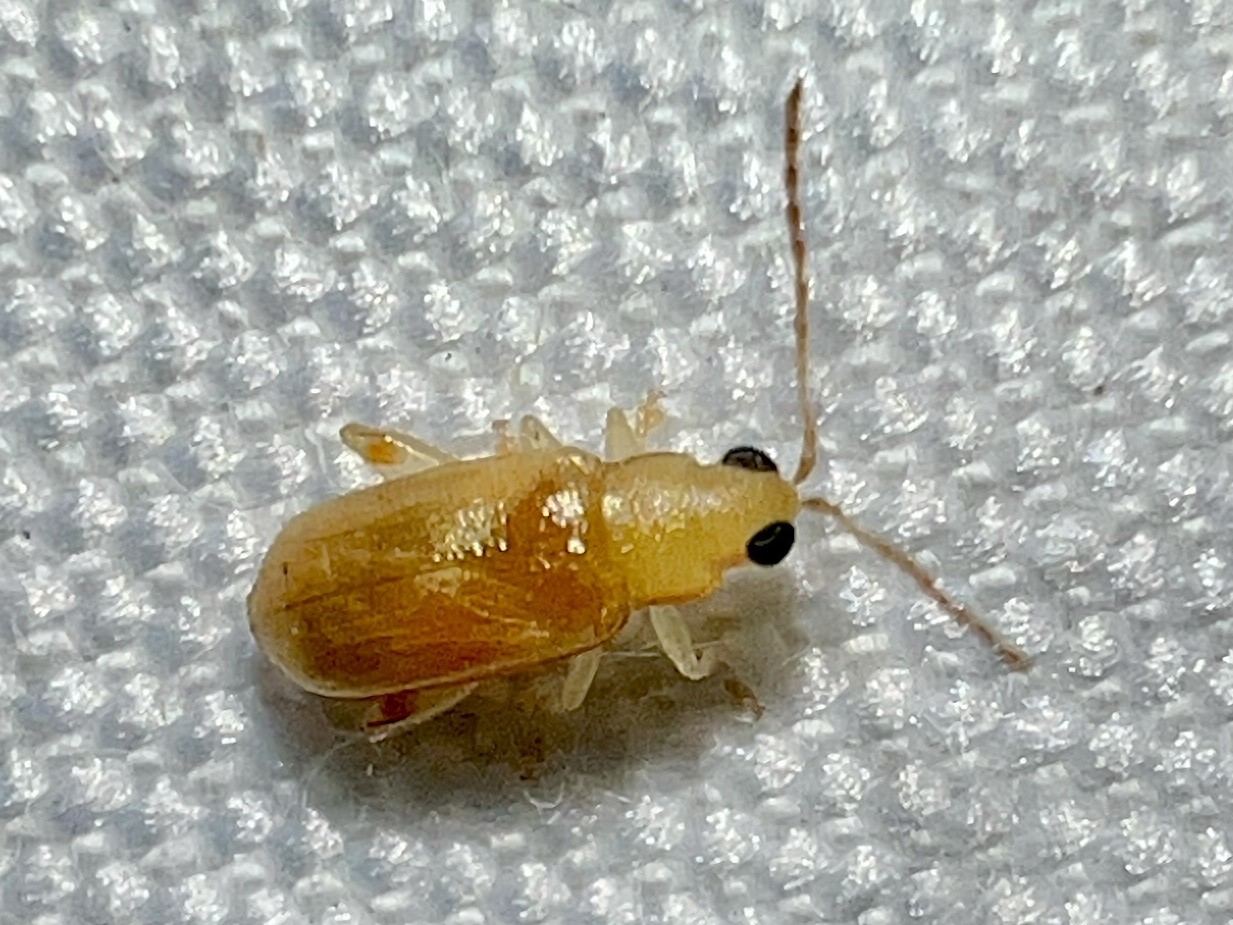

Scientific classification
- Kingdom: Animalia
- Phylum: Arthropoda
- Class: Insecta
- Order: Coleoptera
- Suborder: Polyphaga
- Infraorder: Cucujiformia
- Family: Chrysomelidae
- Tribe: Alticini
- Genus: Systena
- Species: S. corni

Binomial name
- Systena corni Schaeffer, 1932

= Systena corni =

Species of beetle

Systena corni, the dogwood systena, is a species of flea beetle in the family Chrysomelidae. It is found in North America.
