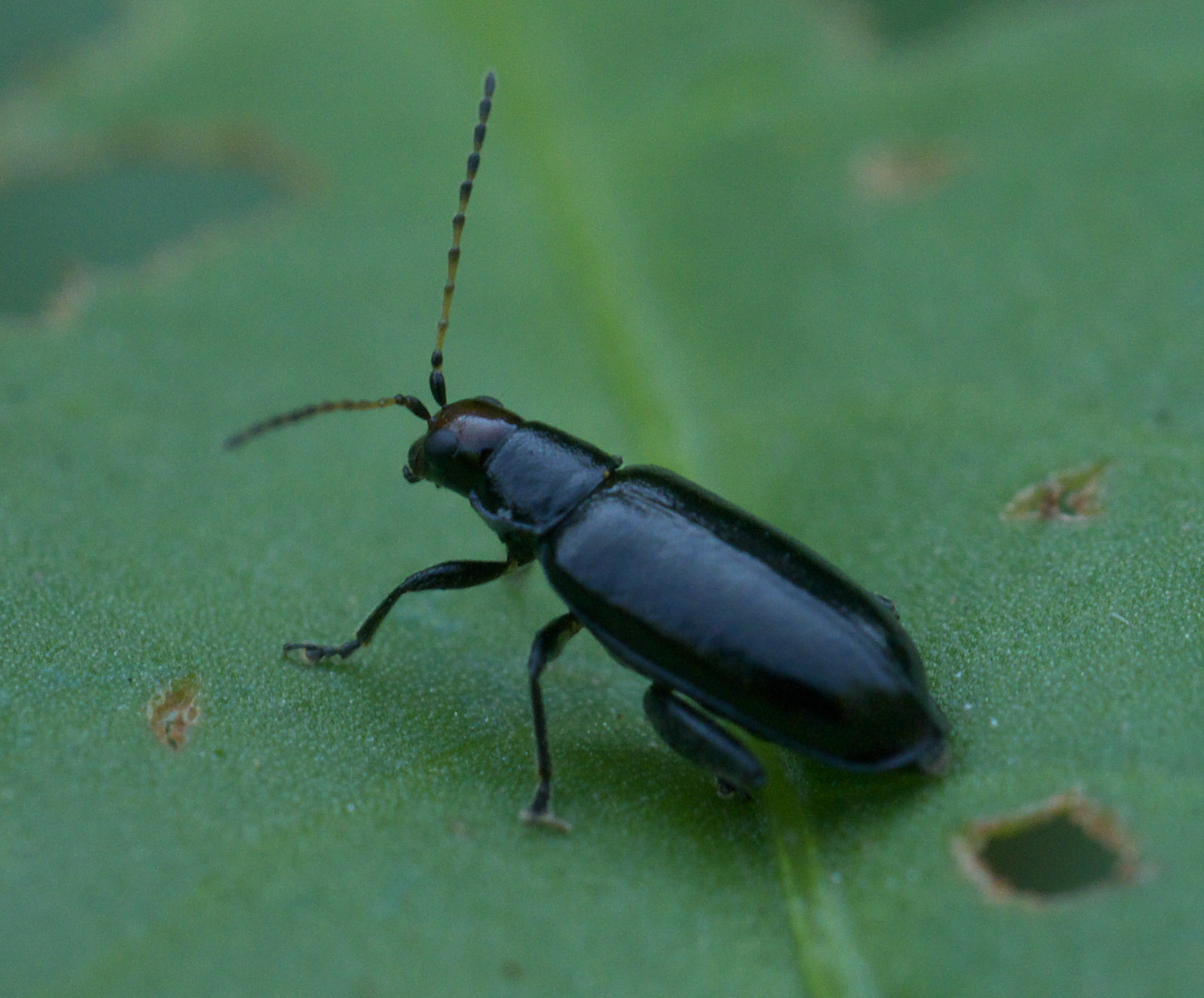
- Adult observed in Mayes County, Oklahoma

Scientific classification
- Kingdom: Animalia
- Phylum: Arthropoda
- Clade: Pancrustacea
- Class: Insecta
- Order: Coleoptera
- Suborder: Polyphaga
- Infraorder: Cucujiformia
- Family: Chrysomelidae
- Genus: Systena
- Species: S. frontalis

Binomial name
- Systena frontalis (Fabricius, 1801)

= Systena frontalis =

Species of beetle

Systena frontalis, the red-headed flea beetle or cranberry flea beetle, is a species of flea beetle in the family Chrysomelidae. It is found in North America. It is named for its red colored head that contrasts its black body. Like other flea beetles, it has powerful saltatorial hind legs specialized for jumping. Like all beetles, this insect is holometabolous The larvae are off white in color, 5-10mm in length, have a sclerotized head capsule and a short posterior protrusion.

It is a common insect pest in the eastern United States. Although its origin is uncertain, S. frontalis is thought to be a native species. It has become a highly destructive pest of ornamental plants in nurseries.

It creates "extensive perforations" in the leaves while feeding on common ironweed, Vernonia fasciculata. It is also known to enjoy hydrangeas. Currently, researchers are looking to better understand its phenology and biology to come up with more sustainable pest management practices than frequent spraying of pesticides.

== Lifecycle ==
Systena frontalis produces one generation a year under natural conditions, but when infesting the container production of plants it may have up to four generations per year, each generation includes egg, larva, pupa, and adult. It overwinters as eggs.

== Host plants ==
Some of the nursery plants that it feeds on include: cranberry, Hydrangea paniculata, Itlex glabra, Rosa, Rhododenron, Osmanthus fragrans, Salvia, Cornus., Sedum, Viburnum, Loropetalum chinense, Forsythia, Lagerstroemia, Buddleija, Abelia, Gardenia, Guara, Illicium, Pyracantha, and Myrica cerifera.

== Gallery ==
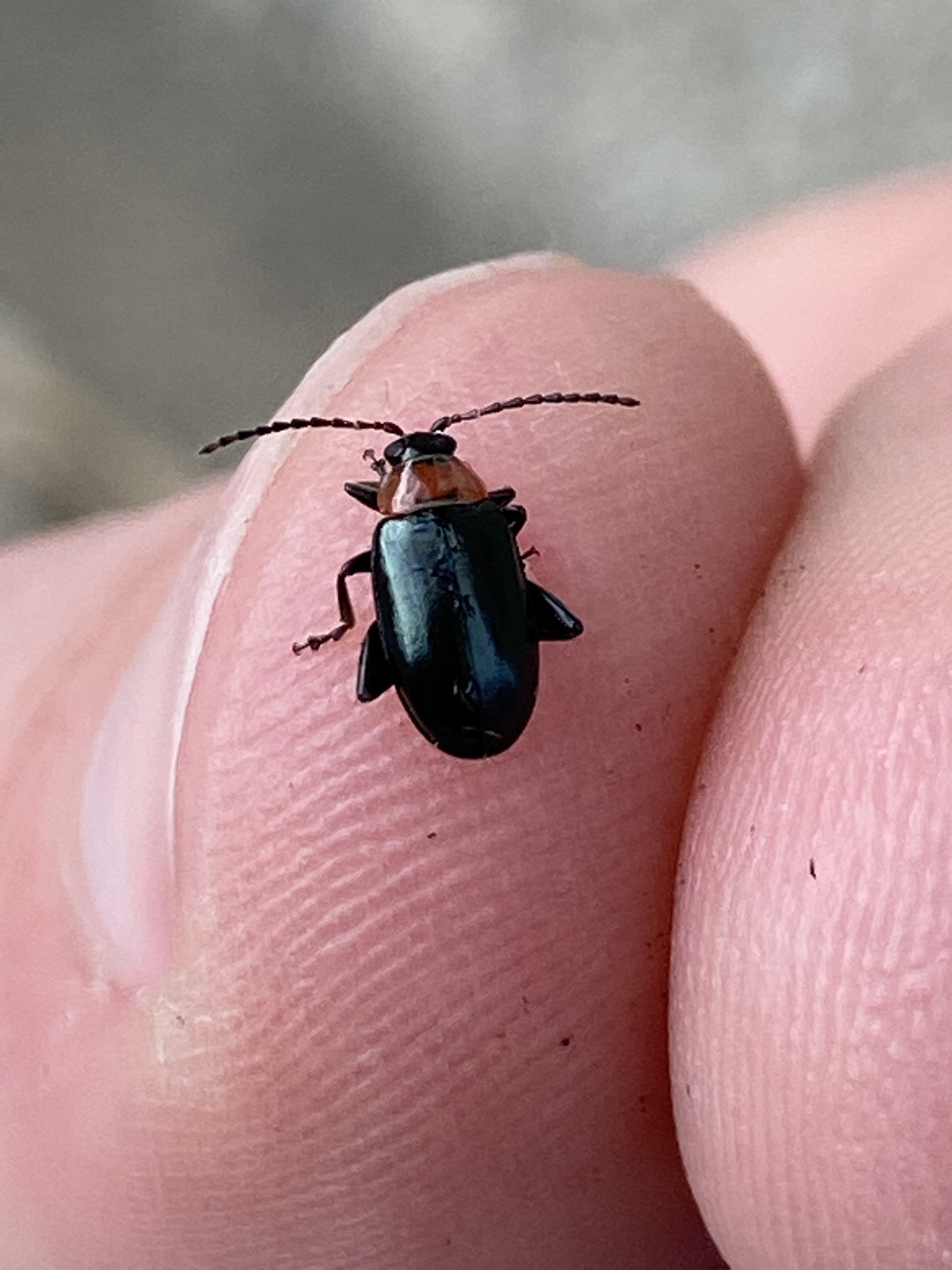
Dorsal view

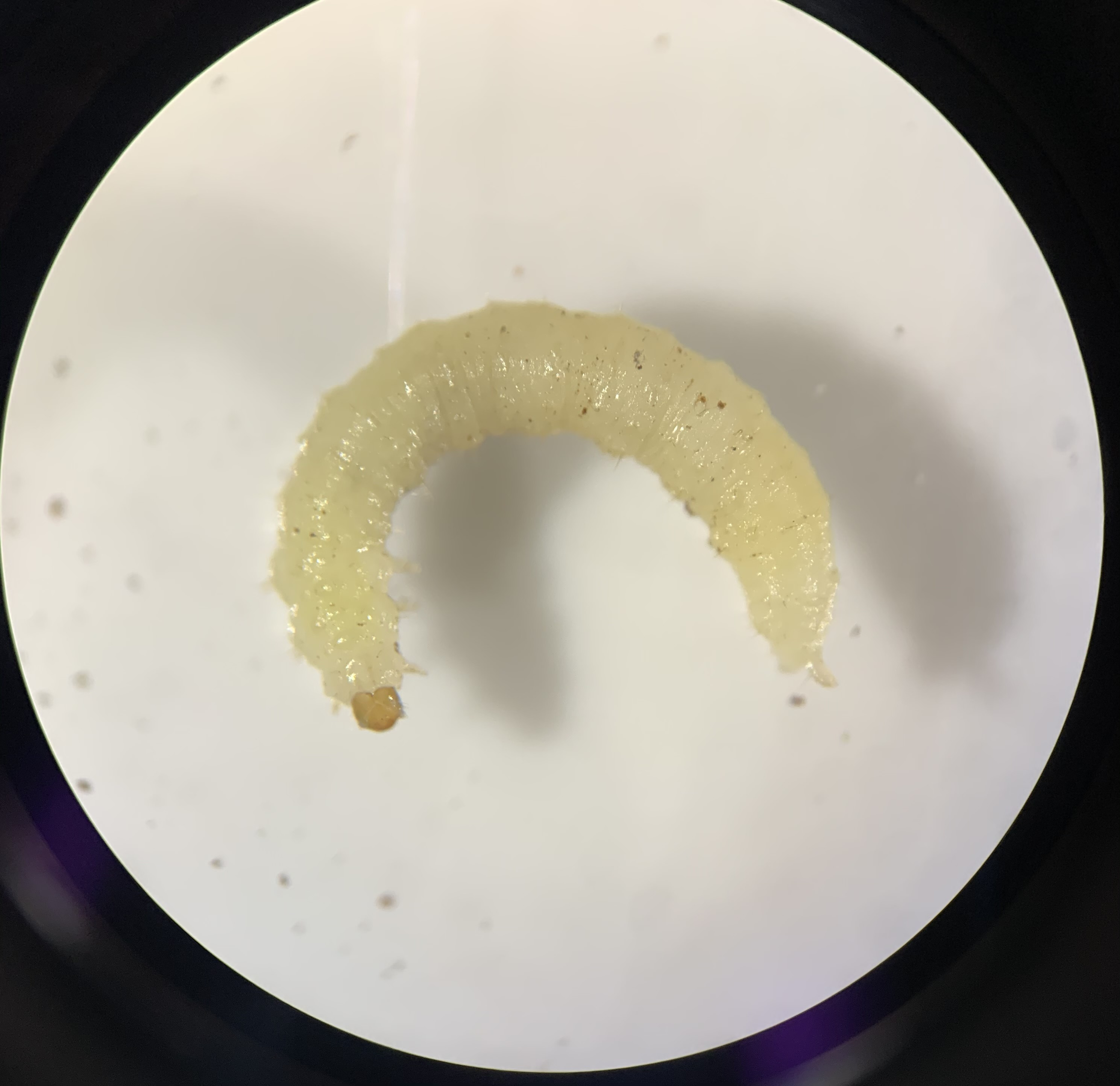
Dissecting microscope view of late instar larva. Found in potted Japanese holly in Virginia.

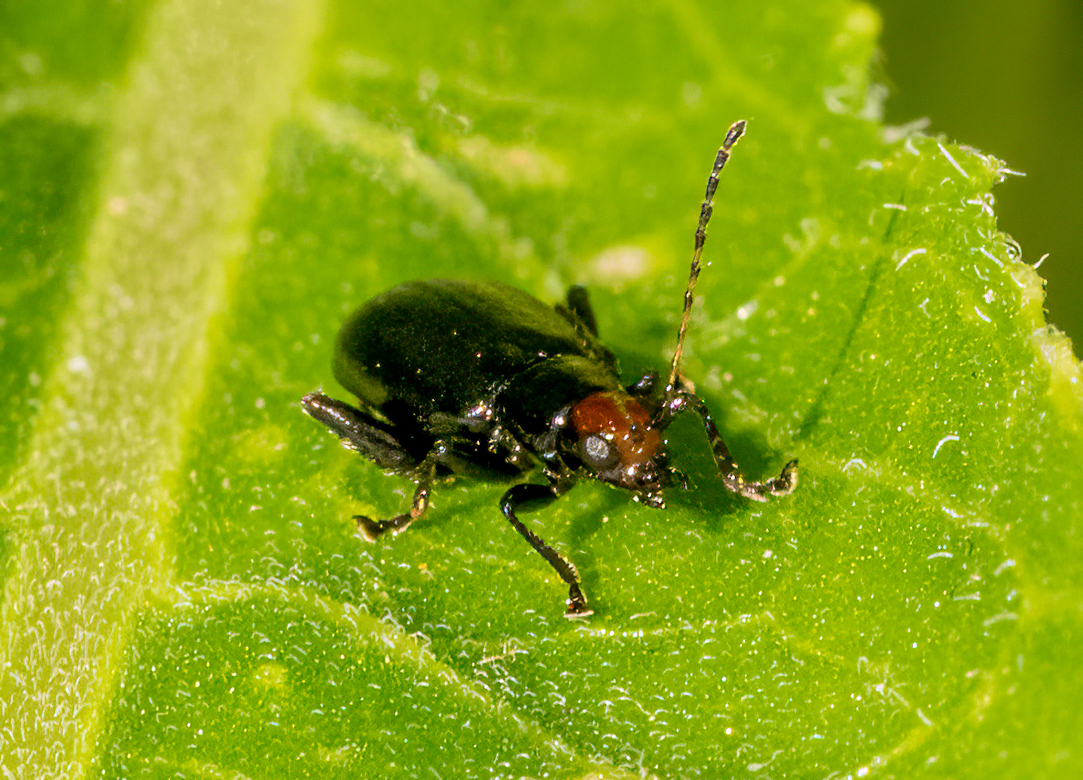
View of red head
