= Systena marginalis =

Margined systena

Scientific classification
- Kingdom: Animalia
- Phylum: Arthropoda
- Class: Insecta
- Order: Coleoptera
- Suborder: Polyphaga
- Infraorder: Cucujiformia
- Family: Chrysomelidae
- Genus: Systena
- Species: S. marginalis

Binomial name
- Systena marginalis (Illiger, 1807)

Species of beetle

Systena marginalis, the margined systena, is a species of flea beetle in the family Chrysomelidae. It is found in North America.
